= Jeep CJ =

Jeep motor vehicle model

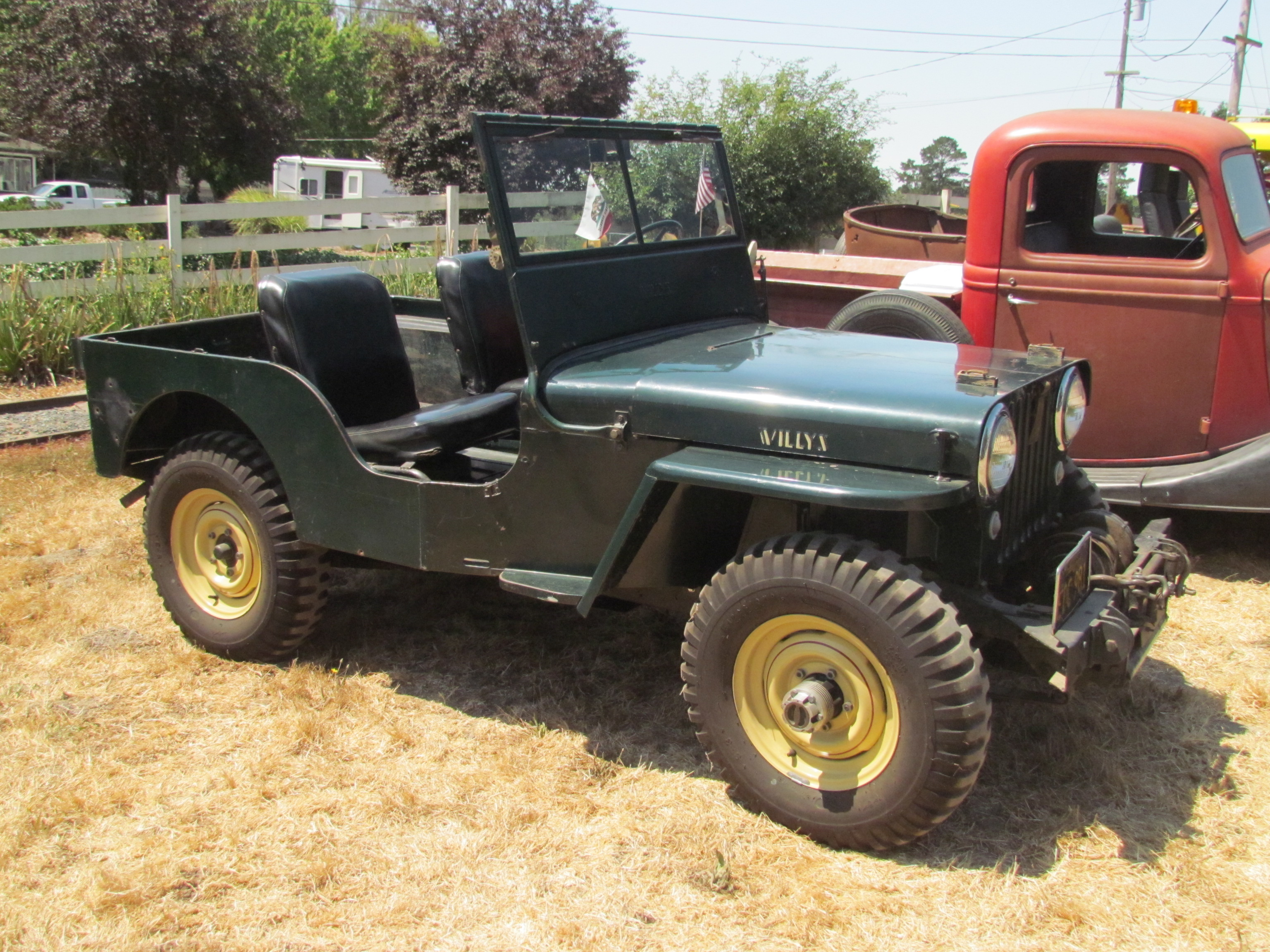
- Jeep CJ-2A

Overview
- Manufacturer: Willys-Overland (1944–1953); Willys Motors (1953–1963); Kaiser Jeep (1963–1970); American Motors Corporation (Jeep) (1970–1986)
- Production: 1944–1986; More than 1.5 million
- Assembly: United States: Toledo, Ohio (Toledo Complex); United States: Maywood, California; Argentina: Santa Isabel (IKA); Australia: Rocklea, Queensland; Brazil: São Bernardo do Campo, São Paulo (Willys Overland do Brasil S.A, later Ford Brasil); Canada: Brampton, Ontario (Brampton Assembly); Egypt: Cairo (AAV); Israel: Haifa; Israel: Nof HaGalil (AIL); Iran: Tehran (Pars Khodro); Mexico: Toluca (Willys Mexicana, later VAM); Spain: Zaragoza (VIASA); Turkey: Istanbul (Türk-Willys Overland)

Body and chassis
- Class: Compact sport utility vehicle
- Body style: doorless / 2-door SUV; doorless / 2-door convertible; 2-door pickup truck
- Layout: Front engine, rear-wheel drive / four-wheel drive

Chronology
- Predecessor: Willys MB (For World War II); Jeep Commando (For pickup version)

The Jeep CJ models are a series and a range of small, open-bodied off-road vehicles and compact pickup trucks, built and sold by several successive incarnations of the Jeep automobile marque from 1945 through 1986. The 1945 Willys "Universal Jeep" was the world's first mass-produced civilian four-wheel drive car.

In 1944, Willys-Overland, the primary manufacturer of the World War II military Jeep, built prototypes for a commercial version – the CJ, short for "civilian Jeep". The design was a direct evolution from the wartime Jeep, but the most obvious change was adding a tailgate, and relocating the spare wheel to the side. Also, beyond adding basic civilian amenities, options, and legally compliant lighting, the CJ required a sturdier drivetrain than the wartime model because targeted rural buyers expected years of durability, not mere weeks as during WWII.

From then on, all CJ Jeeps consistently had a separate body and frame, rigid live axles with leaf springs both front and rear, a tapering nose design with flared fenders, and a fold-flat windshield, and could be driven without doors. Also, with few exceptions, they had part-time four-wheel drive systems, with the choice of high and low gearing, and open bodies with removable hard or soft tops. Standout changes during the 42 model years included the introduction of round-fendered vs. flat-fendered bodies (1955 CJ-5), straight-6 and V8 engines, automatic gearboxes, and different 4-wheel drive systems. The 1976 CJ-7 stretched the wheelbase by 10 inches (25 cm), and made doors and a removable hardtop common items.

After remaining in production under a range of model numbers and several corporate parents, the Jeep CJ line ended after 1986. More than 1.5 million CJ Jeeps were built, having continued the same basic body style for 45 years since the Jeep first appeared. Widely regarded as "America's workhorse", the CJs have been described as "probably the most successful utility vehicle ever made." American Motors VP Joseph E. Cappy said the end of "CJ production will signal an end of a very important era in Jeep history." In 1987, the Jeep CJ-7 was replaced by the first-generation Jeep Wrangler. Looking very similar and riding on the same wheelbase as the CJ-7, it carried over some important components, including its use of leaf springs.

A similar model, the DJ "Dispatcher", was introduced in 1956 as a two-wheel drive version with open, fabric, or a closed steel body in both left- and right-hand drives for hotel, resort, police, and later United States Postal Service markets.

== CJ-1 ==
Willys-Overland CJ-1

Overview
- Production: 1944

Body and chassis
- Related: Willys MB

In 1942, the US Department of Agriculture tested the MB. By 1944, the Allies were confident they would win the war, and wartime production appeared to be winding down. This allowed Willys to consider designing a Jeep for the postwar civilian market. Documentation is scarce, but in early 1944, Willys seemed to have found time to start drawing up plans, and one or two prototypes dubbed CJ(-1) for "Civilian Jeep" were running by May of that year. The first CJs were apparently created by quickly modifying the regular military MB, adding a tailgate, lower gearing, a drawbar, and a civilian-style canvas top. The first CJ served as a quick proof-of-concept test, and when a further design evolution materialized, it probably became the CJ-1 by default. They were manufactured until the CJ-2s appeared, and they were the first Jeeps built from the ground up for civilian use.

No CJ-1s built have survived, and how many were made is unknown.

== CJ-2 ==
Willys-Overland CJ-2

Overview
- Production: 1944–1945; 40 or 45 produced

Body and chassis
- Related: Willys MB

Powertrain
- Engine: 134 cu in (2.2 L) L134 I4
- Transmission: 3-speed Borg-Warner T-90 manual

Dimensions
- Wheelbase: 80 in (2,032 mm)

Although at least 40 were built, the Willys-Overland CJ-2 was not available for retail sale. The CJ-2s, also known as "AgriJeeps", were the second-generation prototypes for the first production civilian Jeep, and were used solely for testing purposes. Although their design was directly based on the military Willys MB, using the same Willys Go Devil engine, they were not only stripped of all military features, particularly the blackout lighting, but also the CJ-2s had many significant differences in body features and construction versus the military Jeep. They had tailgates, power take-offs, engine governors ($28.65), column-shift T90 manual transmissions, 5.38 gears, 2.43:1 low-range transfer cases, and driver's-side tool indentations. Rear wheel wells were redesigned to enlarge, improve, and move seats rearward, and new, more weather-tight top designs were tried. A canvas half-top with roll-down doors was one of several top designs tried before production. The CJ-2 Go-Devil L-head engine was largely the same as the wartime Jeep, but used a different carburetor and ignition system.

The CJ-2s were built in two main batches, but even within the two groups, each was a little different, as they evolved and were modified for various types of work. For instance, they tested several experimental combinations of powertrain components. Earlier models were dubbed “pilot models” because they still differed from the production Jeeps in many ways. They were painted olive-drab and had brass “JEEP” badges on the windshield base, the hood sides, and the rear. Some CJ-2s also had an "AgriJeep" plaque fixed to the dash. Later models were stamped "JEEP" and painted in a few civilian colors that carried over to the "WILLYS" stamping and the colors that appeared on the first production CJ-2A Jeeps built from 1945. The spare tire was mounted forward of the passenger-side rear wheel on the earlier models and aft of the rear wheel on later ones. The CJ-2s were likely distributed to "agricultural stations" for evaluation purposes.

Of the 40–45 CJ-2s built, serial numbers CJ2-03, CJ2-04, CJ2-06 (X30), CJ2-09 (X33), CJ2-11, CJ2-12, CJ2-14, CJ2-16, CJ2-26, CJ2-29, CJ2-32 (X56), CJ2-37 (X61), and CJ2-38 (X62) have survived, although some in very rough condition. CJ2-06 and CJ2-09 have been restored.

== CJ-2A ==
Willys-Overland CJ-2A
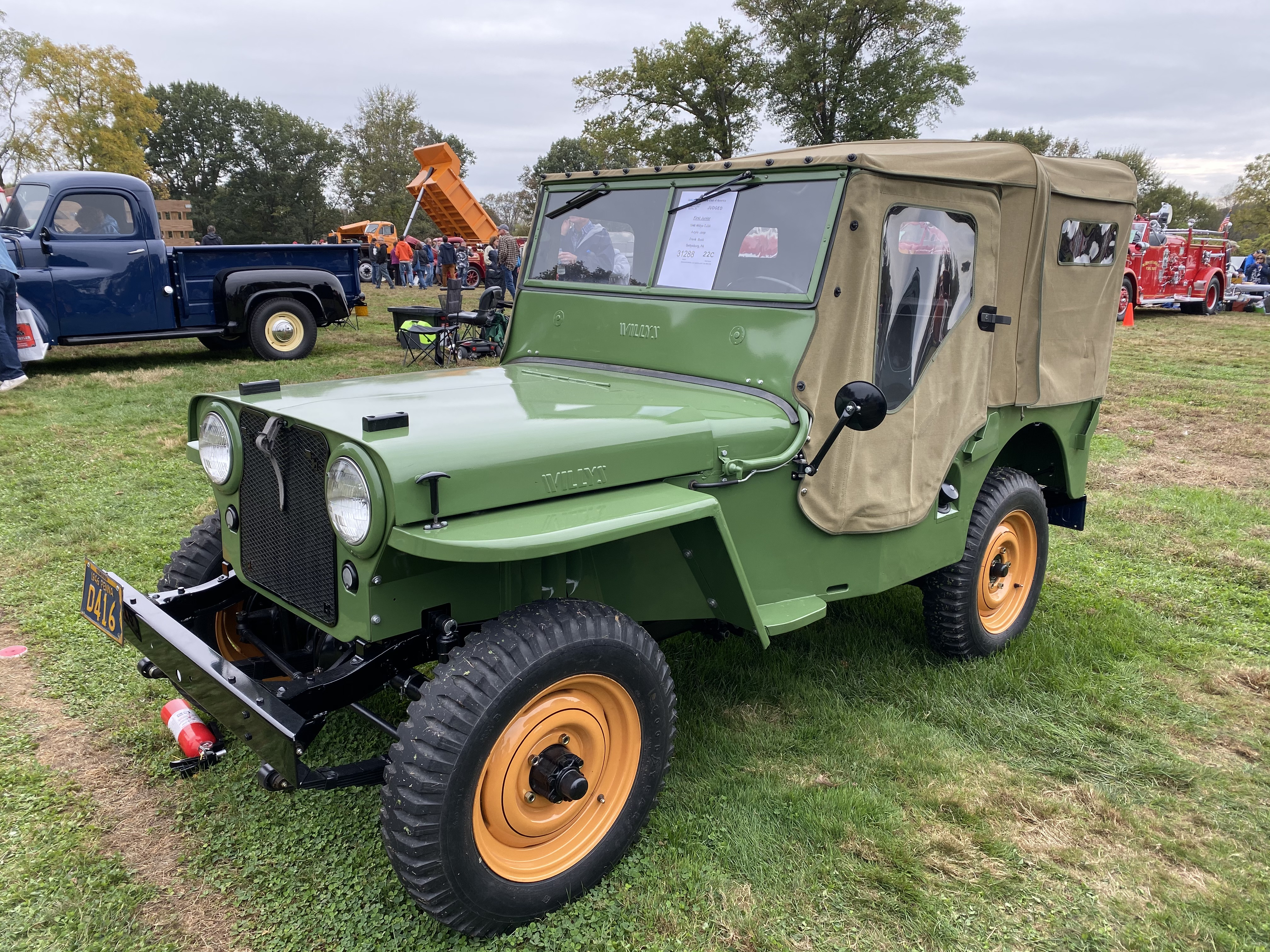

Overview
- Production: 1945–1949; 214,760 produced

Powertrain
- Engine: 134 cu in (2.2 L) L134 I4
- Transmission: 3-speed Borg-Warner T-90 manual

Dimensions
- Wheelbase: 80 in (2,032 mm)
- Length: 130.1 in (3,305 mm)
- Width: 59 in (1,499 mm)
- Height: 69.4 in (1,763 mm) (top up)
- Curb weight: 2,137 lb (969 kg)

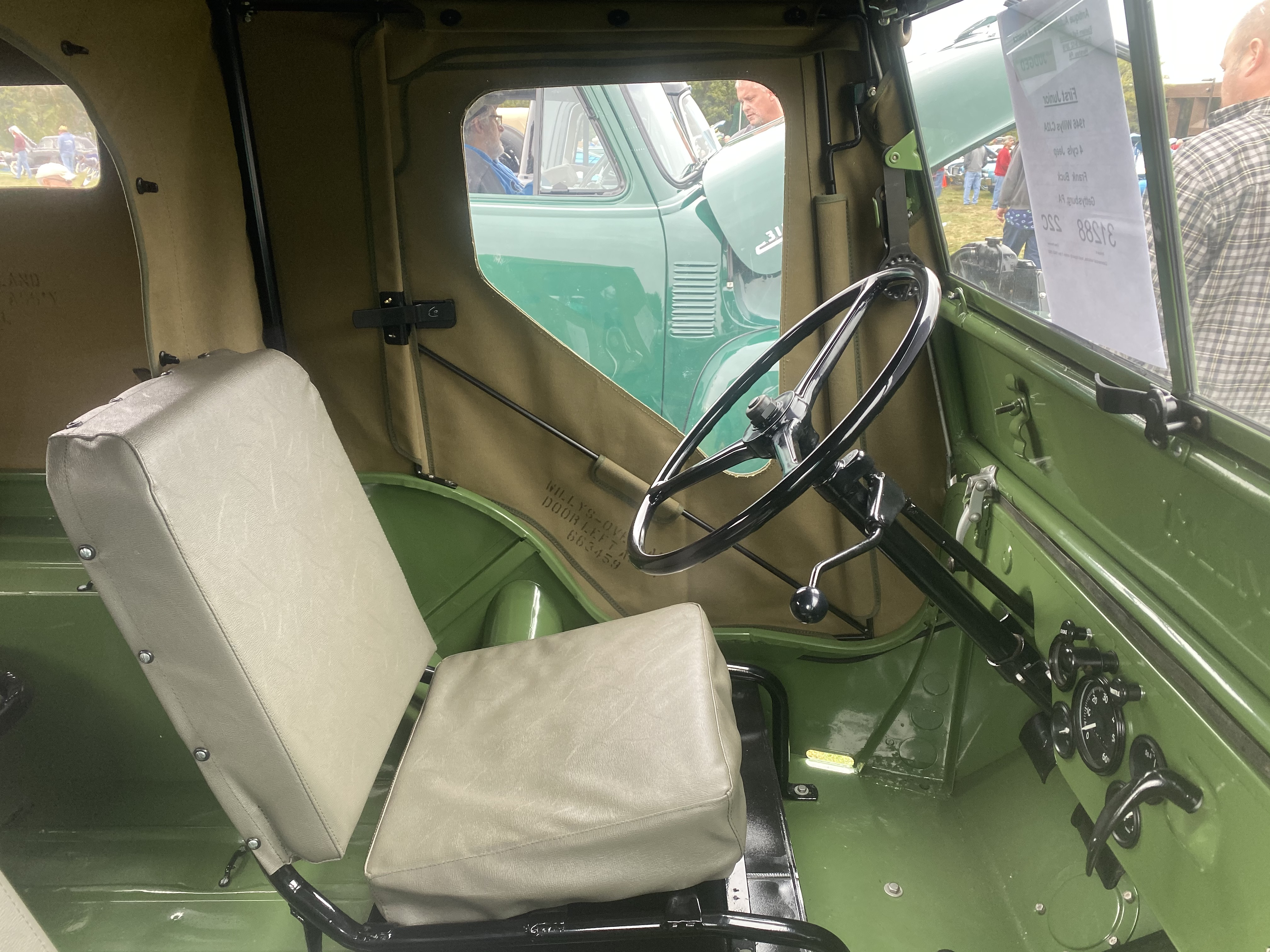
1946 Willys CJ-2A interior

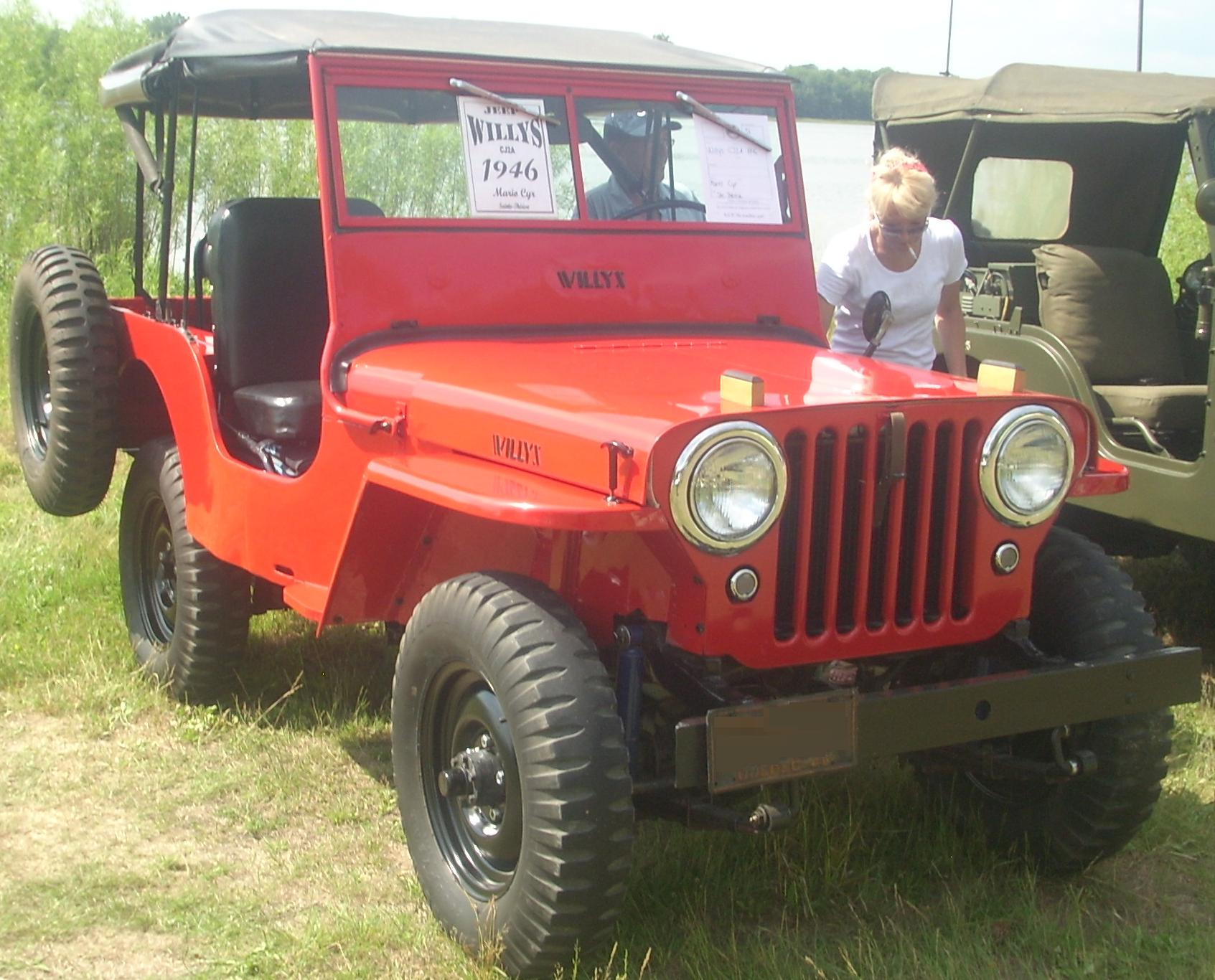
1946 Jeep CJ

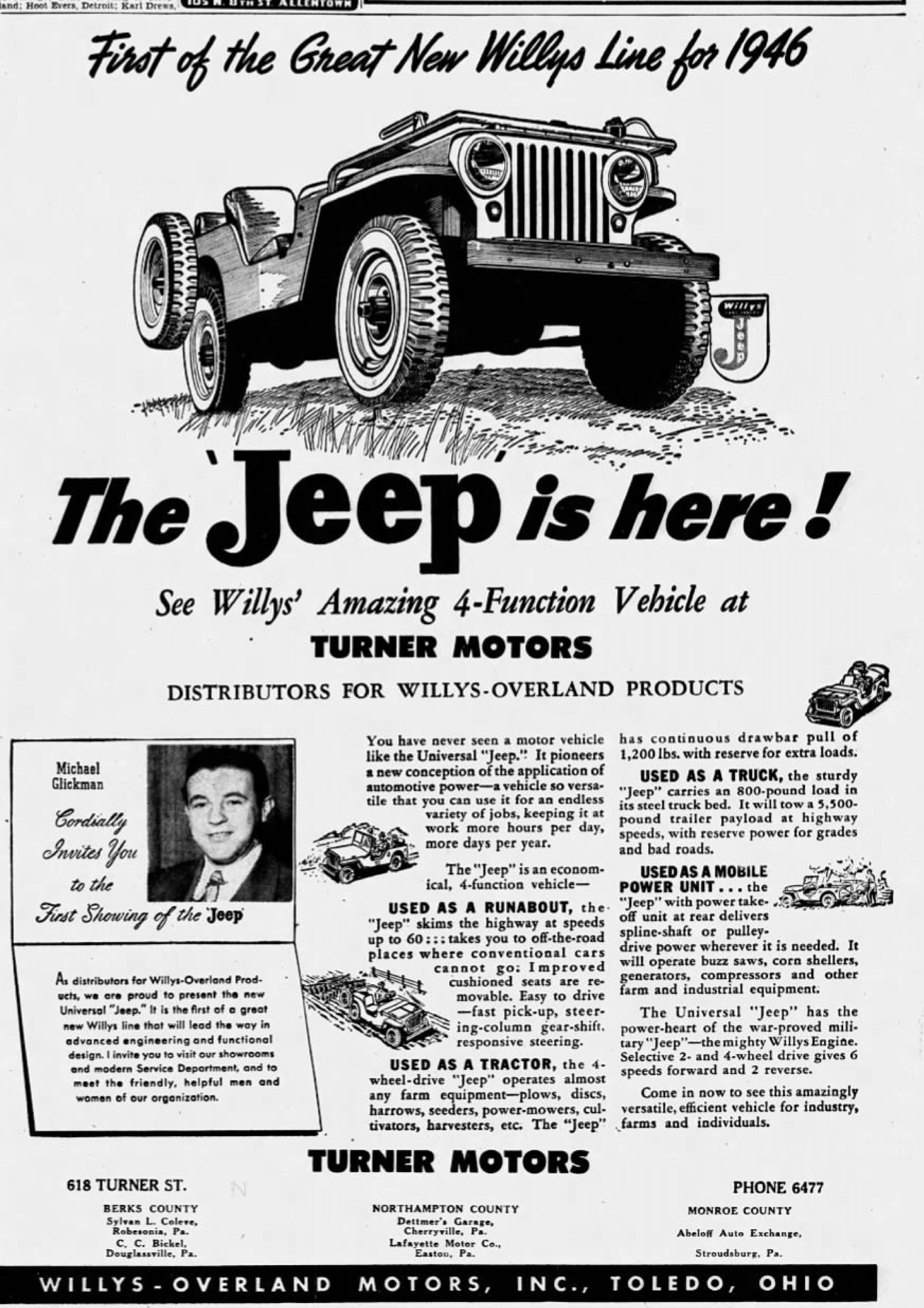
1946 advertisement marketed the "Universal Jeep", not mentioning the CJ-2A type-code yet

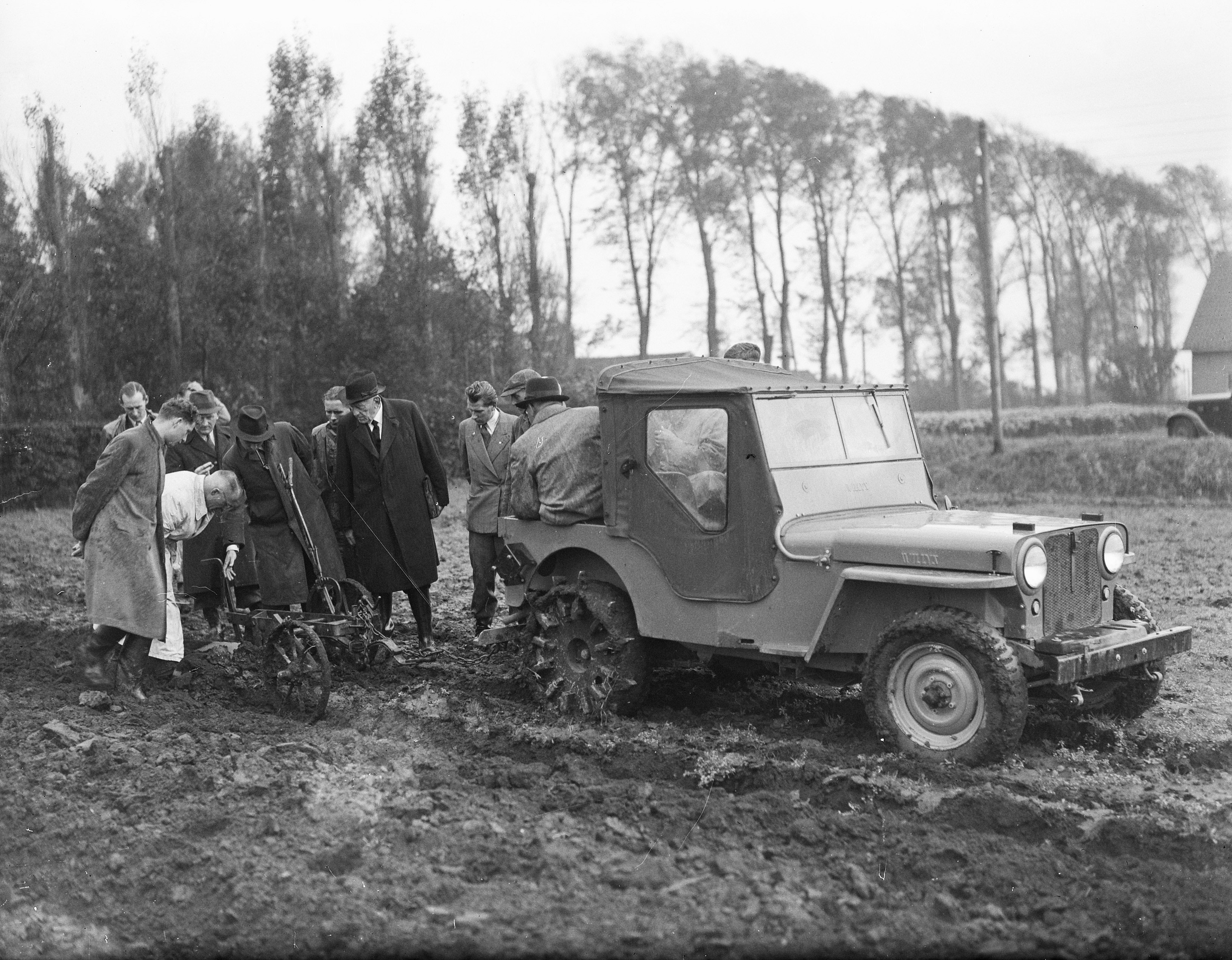
Jeep demonstration for farming and industry – Netherlands, 1946

Lessons learned from the CJ-2 led to the development of the first full-production CJ, the 1945-1949 Willys-Overland CJ-2A, or Universal Jeep. A trademark for "AGRIJEEP" was granted in December 1944, but was not used. The CJ-2A looked much like a civilianized MB, with a tailgate and a side-mounted spare wheel. A distinct difference between the MB and the CJ-2A lay in the grilles of the two vehicles. Where the MB had recessed headlights and nine-slot grilles, the CJ-2A had larger, slightly bulging headlights, flush-mounted in a seven-slot grille. While still powered by the reliable L-134 Go-Devil engine, the CJ-2A replaced the MB's T-84 transmission with a beefier T-90 three-speed.

Production of the CJ-2A began on 17 July 1945, overlapping with the MB; roughly 9000 more MBs were produced through September 1945. Many of the early CJ-2As were produced using remaining stock of the military jeep components, such as engine blocks, and in a few cases, modified frames. Up to serial no. 13453, the MB-style full-floating rear axle was fitted. Once they were used up, the CJ got a stronger Dana / Spicer model 41. Sometimes MB parts were used because of strikes at suppliers such as Autolite. Since Willys produced few parts in-house and relied heavily on suppliers, it was vulnerable to strikes. Unfortunately for Willys, strikes were common after the war, and this likely contributed to low production totals in 1945 and early 1946.

Since the CJ-2A was primarily intended for farming, ranching, and industrial applications, stock CJ-2As only came with a driver seat and driver side mirror, and a wide variety of options was available, such as: front passenger seat, rear seat, center rear-view mirror, canvas top, front power take-off (PTO), rear PTO, belt pulley drive, capstan winch, governor, rear hydraulic lift, snow plow, welder, generator, mower, disc, front bumper weight, heavy-duty springs, dual vacuum windshield wipers (stock CJ-2As were equipped with a manual wiper on the passenger side and a vacuum wiper on the driver side), dual taillights (stock CJ-2As had a taillight on the driver side and a reflector on the passenger side), hot-climate radiator, driveshaft guards, heater, side steps, and radiator brush guard.

The CJ-2As came in lively color combinations that, in some ways, symbolized the hope and promise of postwar America. True to their intended purpose, the combinations also resembled those used by the most popular farm equipment manufacturers of the day. From 1945 to mid-1946, CJ-2As were only available in two color combinations: Pasture Green with Autumn Yellow wheels and Harvest Tan with Sunset Red wheels. Additional color combinations added in mid-1946 were: Princeton Black with Harvard Red or Sunset Red wheels, Michigan Yellow with Pasture Green, Sunset Red, or American Black wheels, Normandy Blue with Autumn Yellow or Sunset Red wheels, and Harvard Red with Autumn Yellow or American Black wheels. The Pasture Green and Harvest Tan combinations were dropped later in 1946. The Harvard Red combinations were dropped in 1947 and replaced with Picket Gray with Harvard Red wheels, and Luzon Red with Universal Beige wheels. In 1948, these color combinations were also added: Emerald Green with Universal Beige wheels, Potomac Gray with Harvard Red or American Black wheels. For 1949, the Picket Gray, Michigan Yellow, and Normandy Blue combinations were dropped. Olive drab was also available for export models.

Early CJ-2As had front seats covered in olive-drab vinyl. Around mid-1947, Slate Gray vinyl became available for certain color combinations. Later, Barcelona Red was added.

A total of 214,760 CJ-2As were produced. Because the earliest CJ-2As used military production parts, and because of the many changes made during early production, restorers and collectors refer to CJ-2As up to around serial no. 34,530 as "Very Early Civilian" and from mid-1946 to about mid-1947 as "Early Civilian". Only minor changes were made after the mid-1947 models.

== CJ-3A ==
Willys-Overland CJ-3A
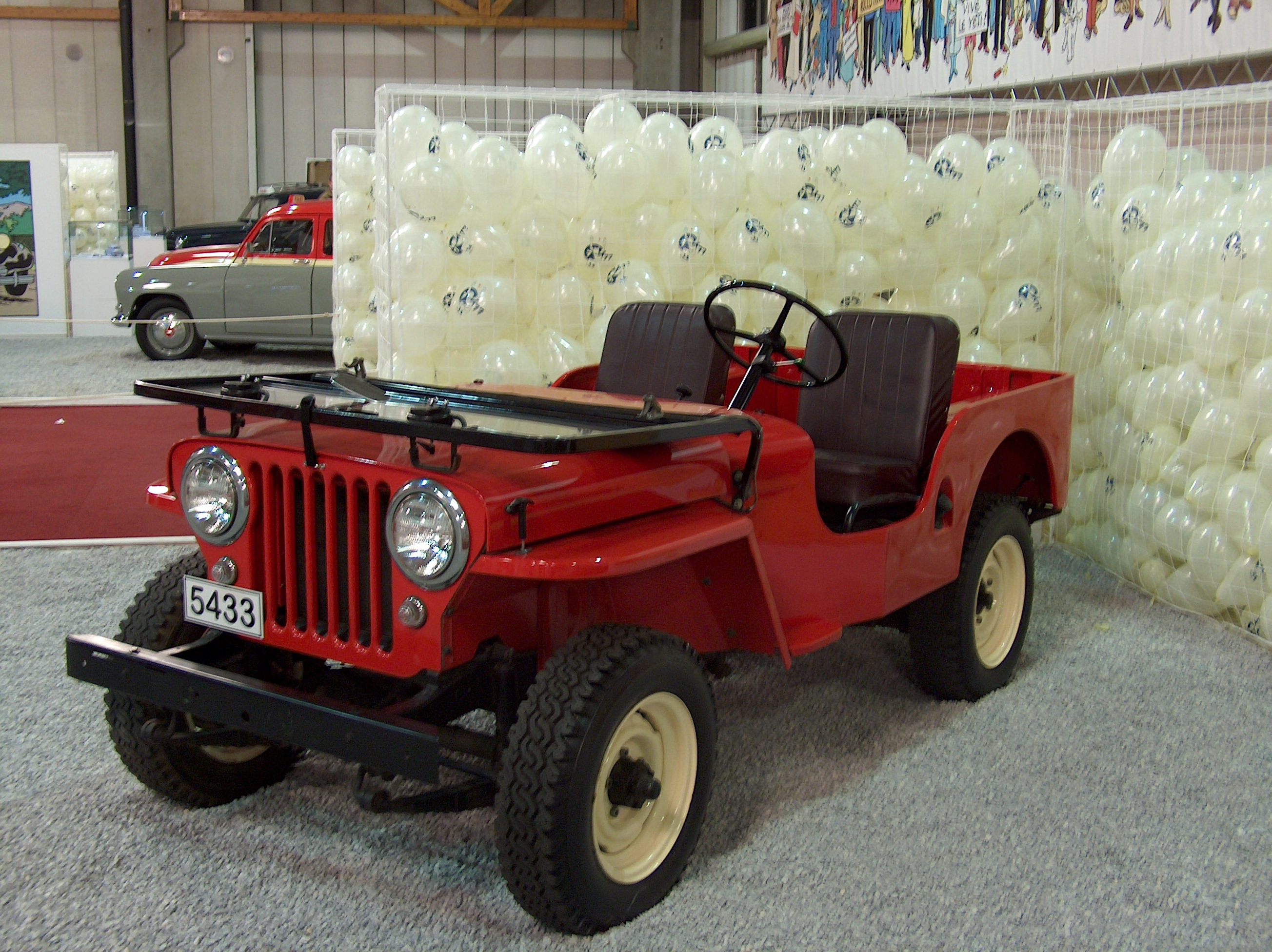

Overview
- Production: 1949–1953; 131,843 produced

Body and chassis
- Related: Willys M38

Powertrain
- Engine: 134 cu in (2.2 L) L134 I4
- Transmission: 3-speed Borg-Warner T-90 manual

Dimensions
- Wheelbase: 80 in (2,032 mm)
- Length: 129.8 in (3,297 mm)
- Width: 57.1 in (1,450 mm) (body) / 63.1 in (1,603 mm) with spare tyre
- Height: 66.4 in (1,687 mm) windshield up

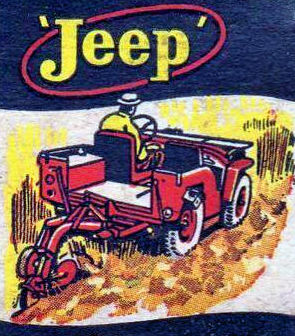
Jeep with plow attachment in 1949 matchbook cover art

The Willys-Overland CJ-3A was introduced in 1949 and was in production until 1953, when the CJ-3 B replaced it. It was powered by Willys' 60 hp (45 kW; 61 PS) L-134 Go-Devil four-cylinder engine, with a T-90 transmission and Dana 18 transfer case, a Dana 25 front axle, and Dana 41 or 44 rear axle. It featured a one-piece windshield with a vent and bottom wipers. The CJ-3A had a beefed-up suspension (10-leaf) to accommodate the various agricultural implements built for the vehicle. Another difference was a shorter rear wheelwell (the wheelwell from the top front edge to the rear of the body is 32 in (810 mm) on the 3A compared to 34 in (860 mm) on the 2A) and moving the driver's seat rearward. As of 1951, a Farm Jeep and a Jeep Tractor version were offered; the latter was very bare-bones, for field use only, and featured a power takeoff.

In total, 131,843 CJ-3As were produced before the series ended in 1953. About 550 CJ-3As were assembled by Mitsubishi as the J1/J2 in late 1952 and early 1953, exclusively for the Japanese police and forestry agency.

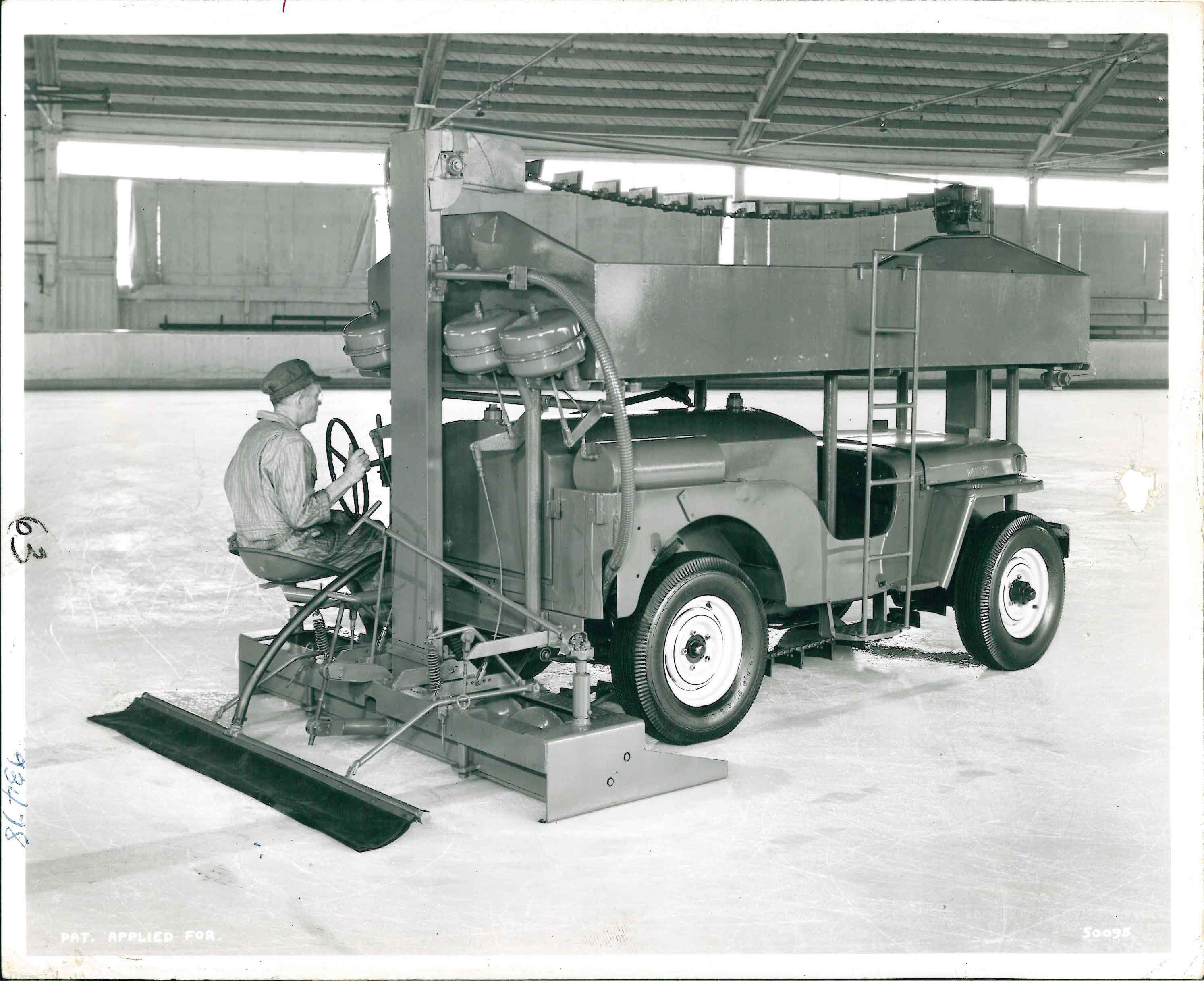
Zamboni Model B ice resurfacer mounted on a Jeep CJ

The CJ-3A-derived military jeep was the Willys MC (or M38), and it began complementing the Ford and Willys World War II jeeps starting in 1949.

The CJ-3A, along with the later CJ-3B and CJ-5 models, was used as a platform for early Zamboni ice resurfacers produced from 1950 until 1964, which were mounted on top of Jeeps to clean and smooth the surface of ice rinks. Zamboni resurfacer models produced from 1964 onwards have since been constructed using original chassis designs, eliminating the need to source Jeep parts.

== CJ-4 ==
Willys-Overland CJ-4

Overview
- Production: 1951; One produced

Powertrain
- Engine: 134 cu in (2.2 L) Hurricane I4

Dimensions
- Wheelbase: 81 in (2,057 mm)

The Willys-Overland CJ-4 (also known as the "X-151") was built only as an experimental concept in 1950 or 1951. It used the new Willys Hurricane engine and had an 81 in (2,057 mm) wheelbase. The CJ-4 body tub was an intermediate design between the straightforward raised hood of the CJ-3B and the all-new curved body style of the CJ-5. The design was rejected, and the vehicle was eventually sold to a factory employee.

Evidence suggests that derived prototypes called CJ-4M and CJ-4MA (XM170) were also seriously considered as precursors to the 1951 M38A1 and M170 military Jeeps. Although the CJ-4M prototype may not have been actually built, the stretched wheelbase ambulance prototype with registration "CJ-4MA-01" turned up in 2005.

== CJ-3B ==
Willys CJ-3B
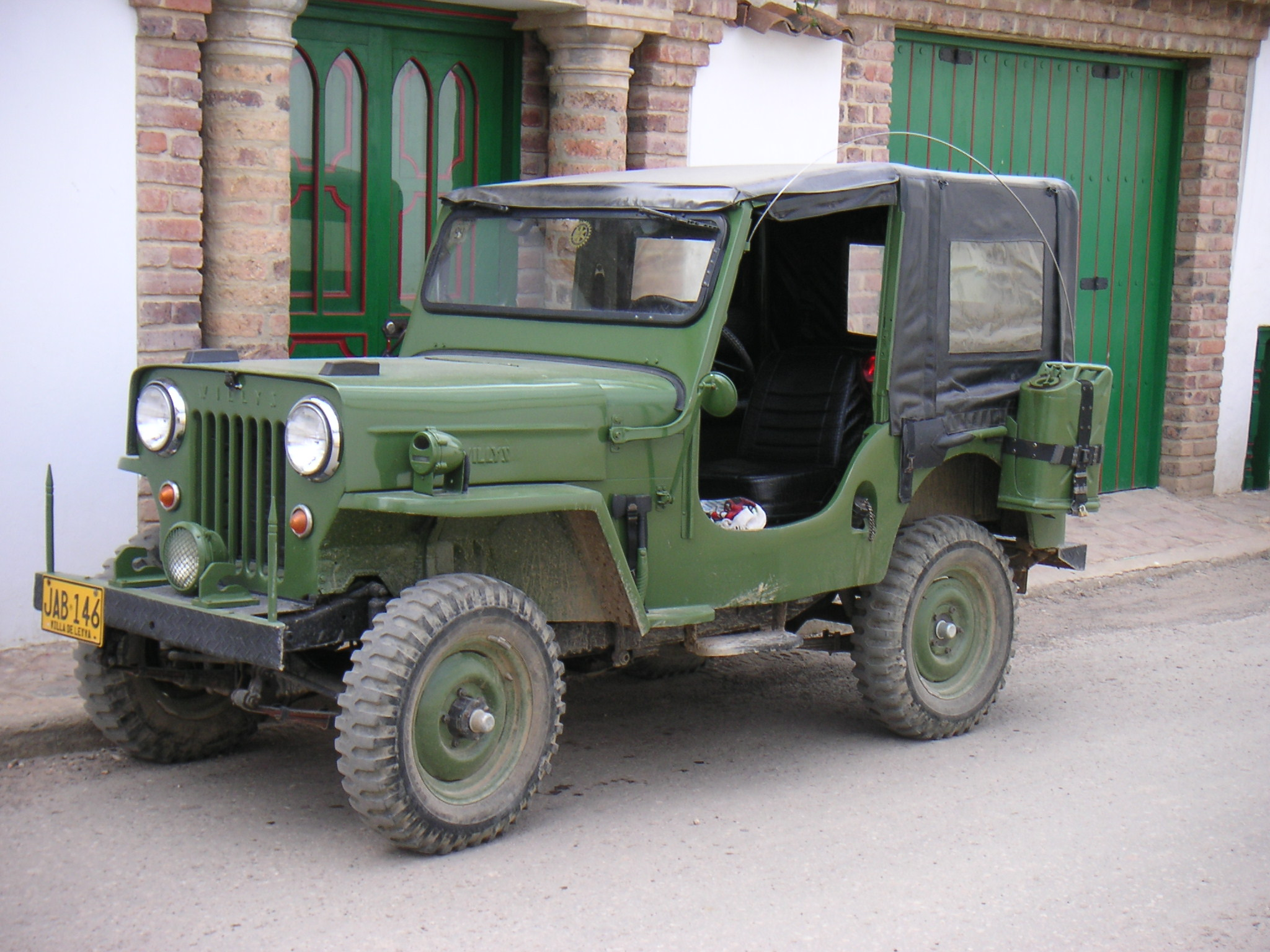

Overview
- Production: 1953–1968

Body and chassis
- Related: Willys M606

Powertrain
- Engine: 134 cu in (2.2 L) Hurricane I4

Dimensions
- Wheelbase: 80 in (2,032 mm)
- Length: 129.875 in (3,299 mm)

The Willys CJ-3B replaced the CJ-3A in 1953, the same year Willys-Overland was bought by Kaiser Motors. The Kaiser parent company removed "Overland" from the Willys Motors subcompany name. The CJ-3B introduced a higher grille and hood to clear the new Willys Hurricane engine. A four-speed manual transmission became optional in 1963, at an extra cost of $194 (~$2,040 in 2025). The turning radius was 17.5 ft (5.3 m). Until 1968, about 196,000 CJ-3Bs were produced, of which 155,494 were assembled in the U.S.

The CJ-3B became the M606 military jeep (mostly used for export through 1968) by adding commercially available heavy-duty options, such as larger tires and springs, and by adding blackout lighting, olive drab paint, and a trailer hitch. Shipments of the M606 militarized version of the Jeep CJ-3B, exported for military aid under the Mutual Defense Assistance Program, accounted for a substantial percentage of the limited CJ-3B production in the 1960s.

=== International licenses and derivatives ===
The CJ-3B design was also licensed to several international manufacturers, which produced civilian and military variants long after 1968, including Mitsubishi of Japan and Mahindra of India. Mitsubishi built its version from 1953 to 1998, while Mahindra continued to produce vehicles based on the Willys CJ-3B until October 1, 2010. Türk Willys Overland also built the CJ-3 B in Tuzla County, Kocaeli. It was the first off-road vehicle plant to be opened in Turkey in 1954. It was produced under the Tuzla 1013 brand. Mahindra's "Mahindra CJ" was produced in two versions: four-seater CJ 340 and six-seater CJ 540. Both were equipped with Peugeot-sourced 64 hp (48 kW; 65 PS) engines.

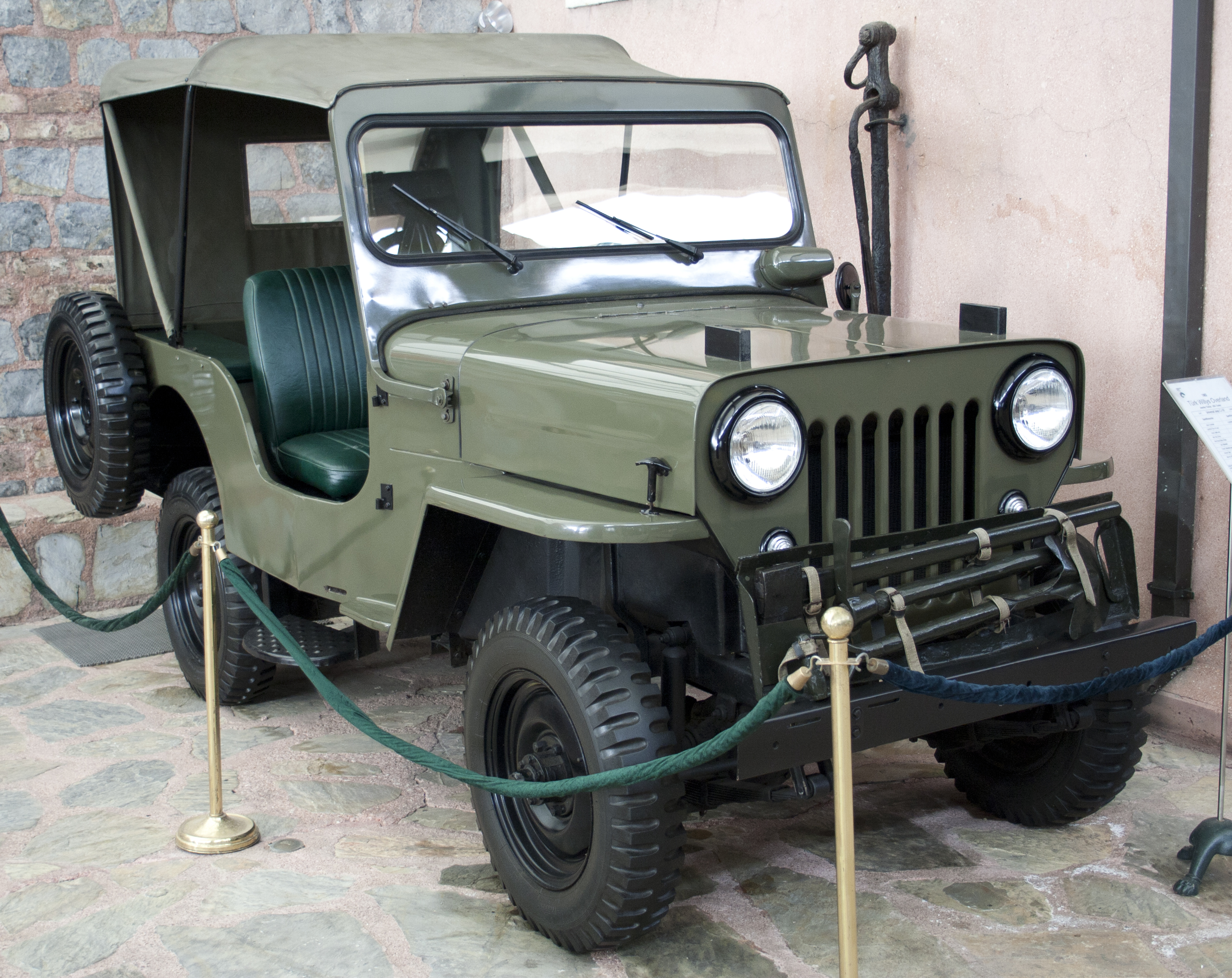
A 1963 Türk Willys Overland CJ-3B on display at the Rahmi M. Koç Museum of Transportation, Istanbul

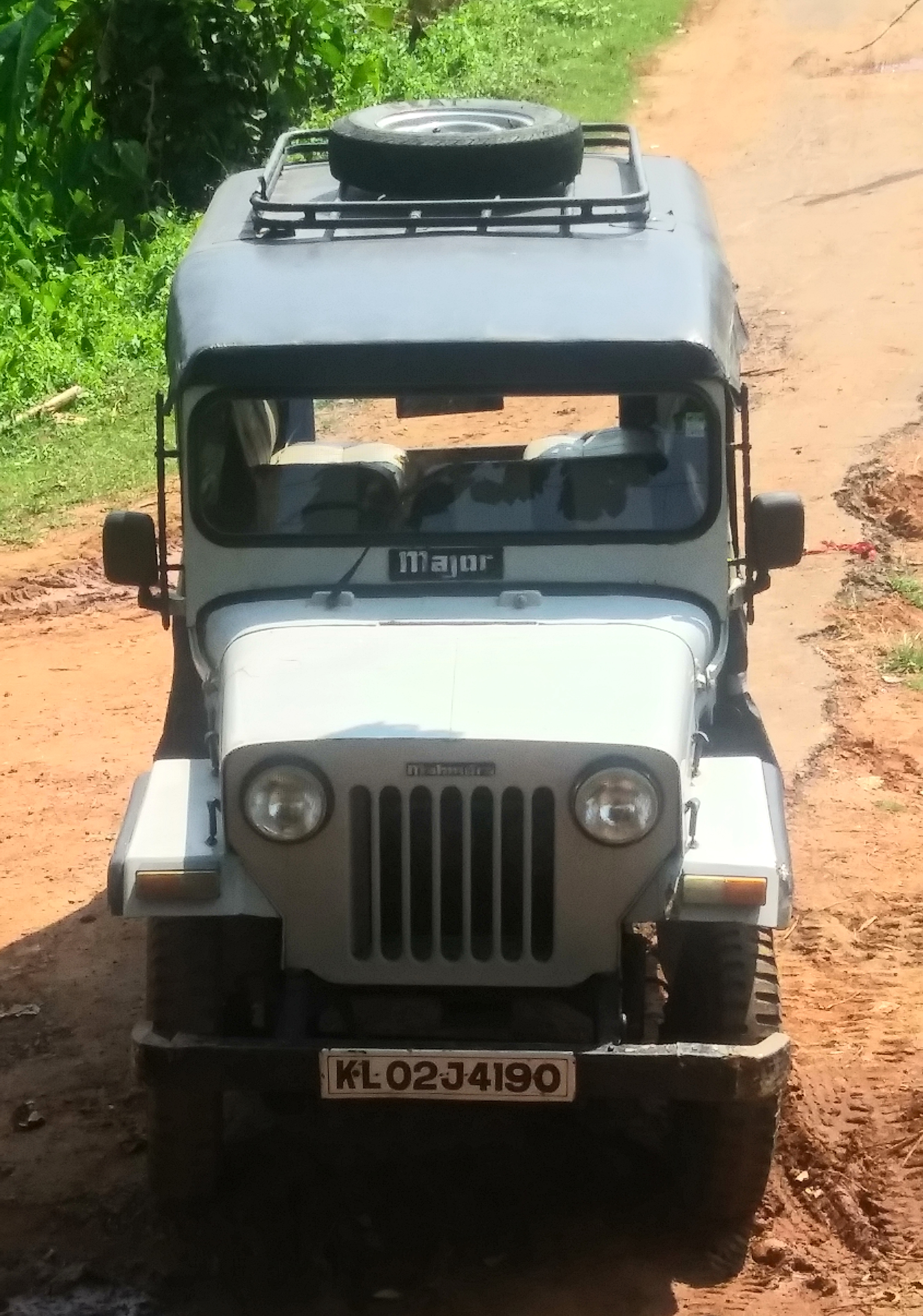
Mahindra's Major, the last jeep made by Mahindra based on Jeep CJ-3B.

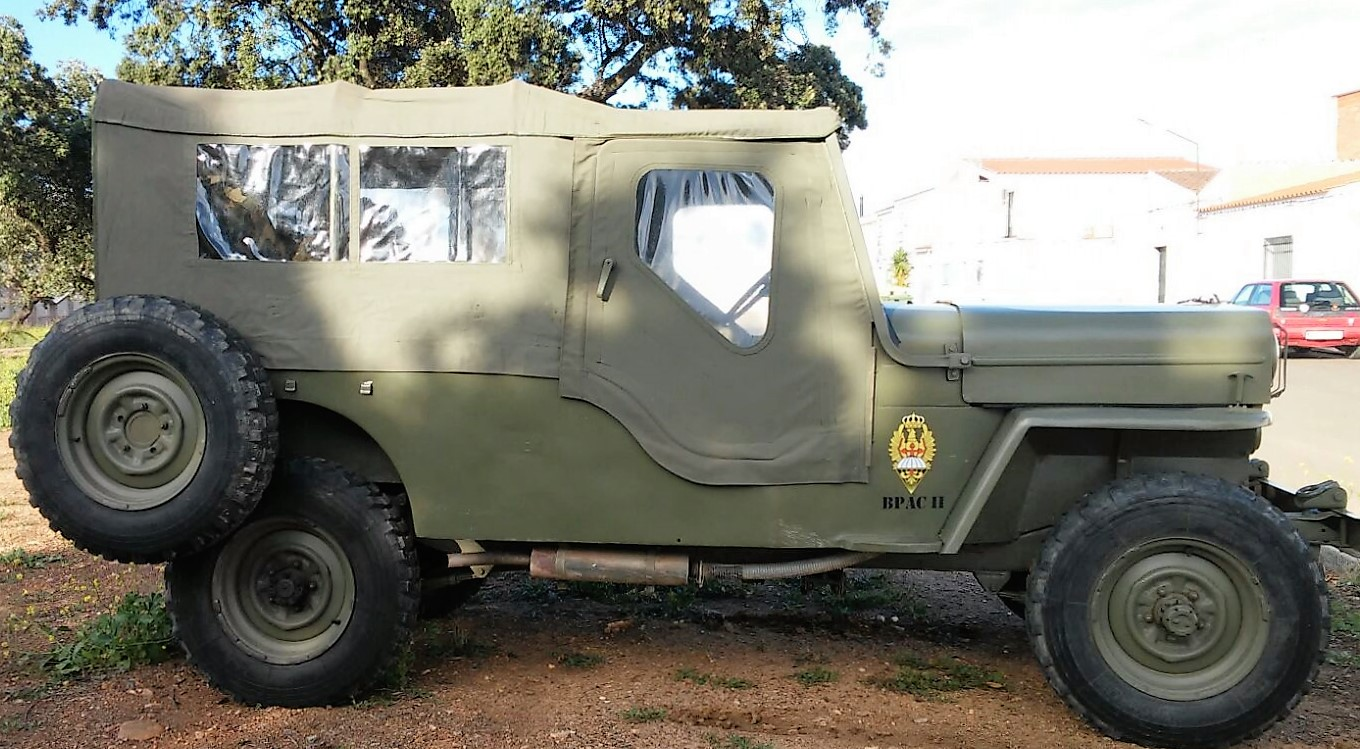
VIASA in Spain built their model 'MB-CJ6' – a stretched CJ-3B with an MB 'Go-Devil' engine.

=== Mitsubishi Jeep ===
Mitsubishi Jeep J-series
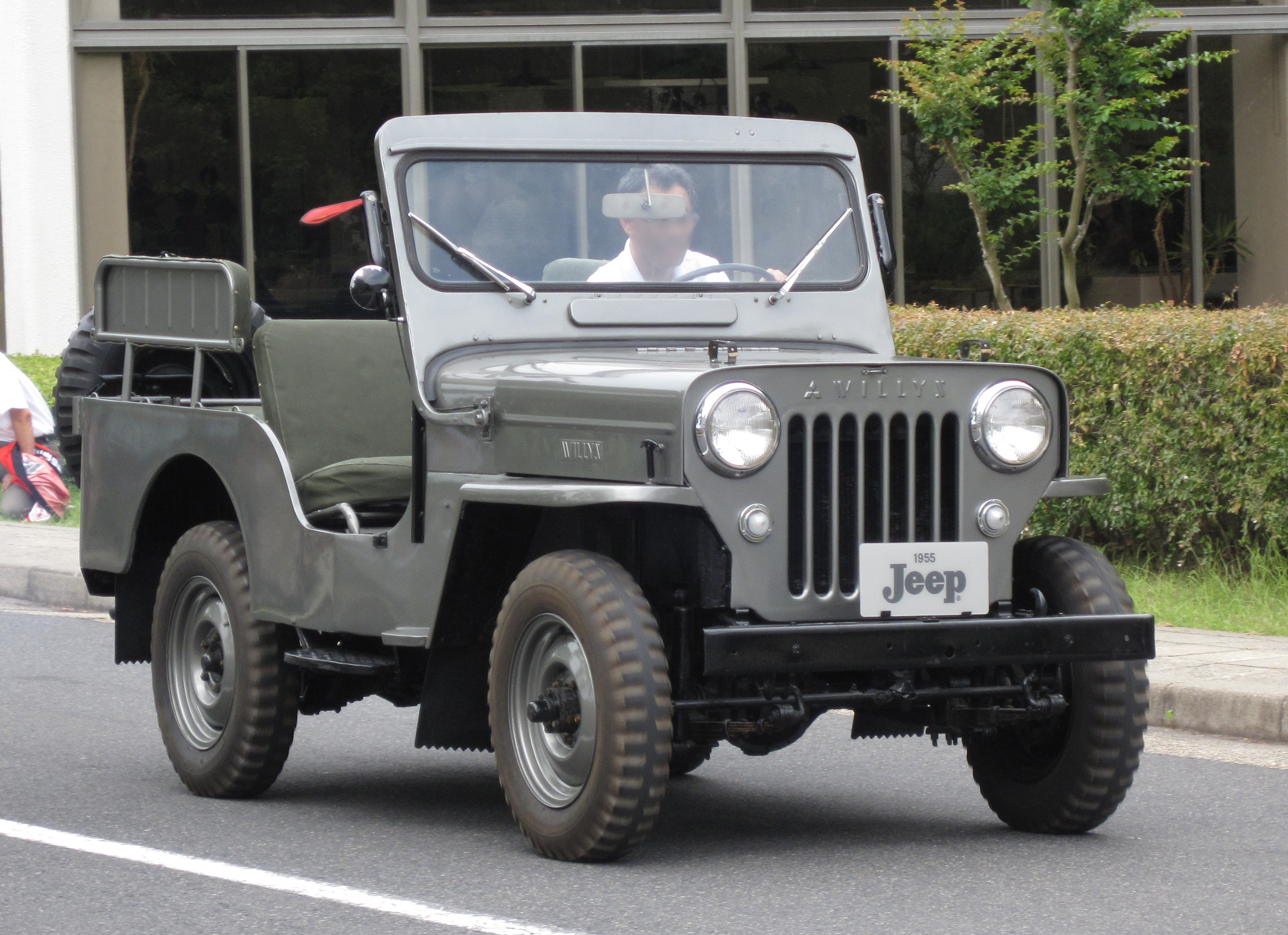

Overview
- Manufacturer: Mitsubishi Motors
- Production: 1953–1998
- Assembly: Japan: Sakahogi, Gifu (Pajero Manufacturing Co., Ltd)

Body and chassis
- Body style: 2-door SUV; 2-door convertible; 4-door station wagon
- Layout: Front engine, four-wheel drive

Powertrain
- Engine: 2.0 L 4G52 I4; 2.2 L JH4 I4; 2.4 L 4G53 I4; 2.2 L KE31 diesel I4; 2.7 L 4DR5 diesel I4

Dimensions
- Wheelbase: 2,030 mm (80 in); 2,255 mm (88.8 in); 2,640 mm (104 in)
- Length: 3,390–4,330 mm (133–170 in)

Chronology
- Successor: Mitsubishi Pajero

The Jeep was introduced to the Japanese market as the Jeep J3 in July 1953 after Willys agreed to allow Mitsubishi to market the car, competing with the Nissan Patrol and the Toyota Land Cruiser. The name wasn't in reference to "CJ3", but rather denoted the fact that 53 "J1"s (CJ-3A with 6-volt electrics) had been built for the Japanese regional forest office and around 500 "J2"s (CJ-3A with 12-volt electrics) were built for the National Safety Forces. Mitsubishi continued knock-down production of vehicles derived from the CJ-3B design until August 1998, when tighter emissions and safety standards finally made the Jeep obsolete. In total, Mitsubishi built about 200,000 units over those 45 years. Short, medium, and long wheelbases were available, as well as a variety of bodystyles, and gasoline and diesel engines. In Japan, it was sold at a specific retail chain called Galant Shop. The Japanese GSDF refers to them as Type 73 light truck.

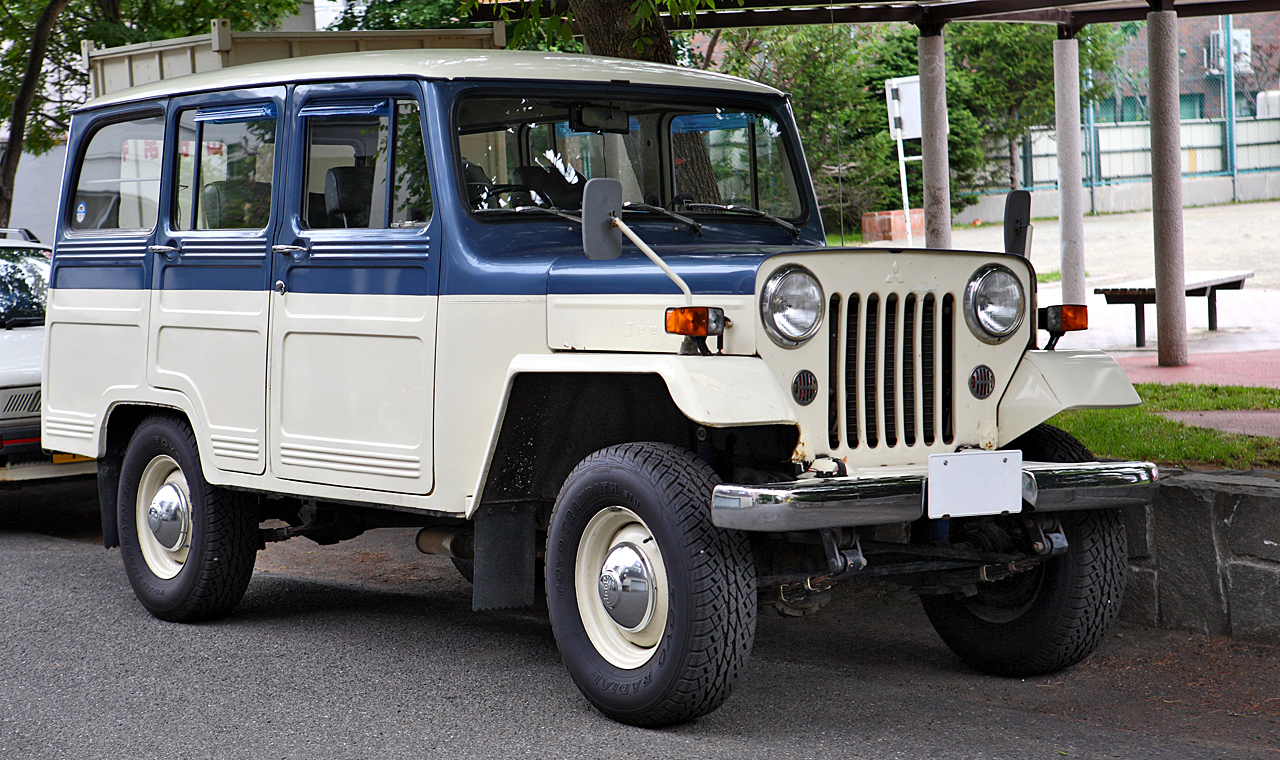
Mitsubishi Jeep delivery wagon J37

The original J3 was a basic, doorless, roofless version with left-hand steering, rather than right-hand, despite Japan having left-side traffic. The first right-hand drive versions did not appear until nearly eight years later (J3R/J11R). The original J3 and its derivatives were equipped with the 2.2 L (2,199 cc) F-head "Hurricane" (called JH4 by Mitsubishi, for Japanese Hurricane 4-cylinder) inline four-cylinder, originally producing 70 PS (51 kW; 69 hp) at 4,000 rpm. In 1955, a slightly longer wheelbase J10 that could seat six was added, and in 1956, the J11 appeared: a two-door "delivery wagon" with a full metal body. This was considerably longer, at 433 cm (170 in) versus 339 cm (133 in) for the J3.

Local production of the JH4 engine commenced in 1955. A locally developed diesel version (KE31) was introduced for the JC3 in 1958, originally with 56 PS (41 kW) at 3,500 rpm but with 61 PS (45 kW; 60 hp) at 3,600 rpm a few years later. Later versions used 4DR5 and 4DR6 (J23 turbo) 2.7 liter overhead-valve diesel engines. The final military version, the J24A, produced 135PS from an improved 4DR5 engine with a front-mounted air-to-air intercooler.

By 1962, the output of the gasoline JH4 engine had crept up to 76 PS (56 kW; 75 hp). By the time of the introduction of the longer J20 in 1960, a six-seater like the J10, but with a differently configured (more permanent) front windshield, as well as available metal doors, Mitsubishi had also added small diagonal skirts to the leading edge of the Jeep's front fenders. This remained the last change to the front sheet metal until Mitsubishi ended Jeep production in 1998.

Later models include 2-L, short-wheelbase, soft-top J58 (J54 with a diesel engine), and the J38 gasoline wagon on the longest wheelbase. The last iteration of the Japanese Jeeps was the J53 with diesel turbo engine.

=== Asia Motors K111 (KM410) series ===
The K111 (export name: KM410) is a South Korean military "jeep" designed based on the M606, but built to a fully militarized specification. Rather than being a licensed production of the Jeep brand, it is a reverse-engineered variant. It was produced by Asia Motors and saw heavy operational use by Iran during the Iran–Iraq War. Asia Rocsta is a civilian vairant of the K111.

== CJ-5 ==
Willys CJ-5/Jeep CJ-5
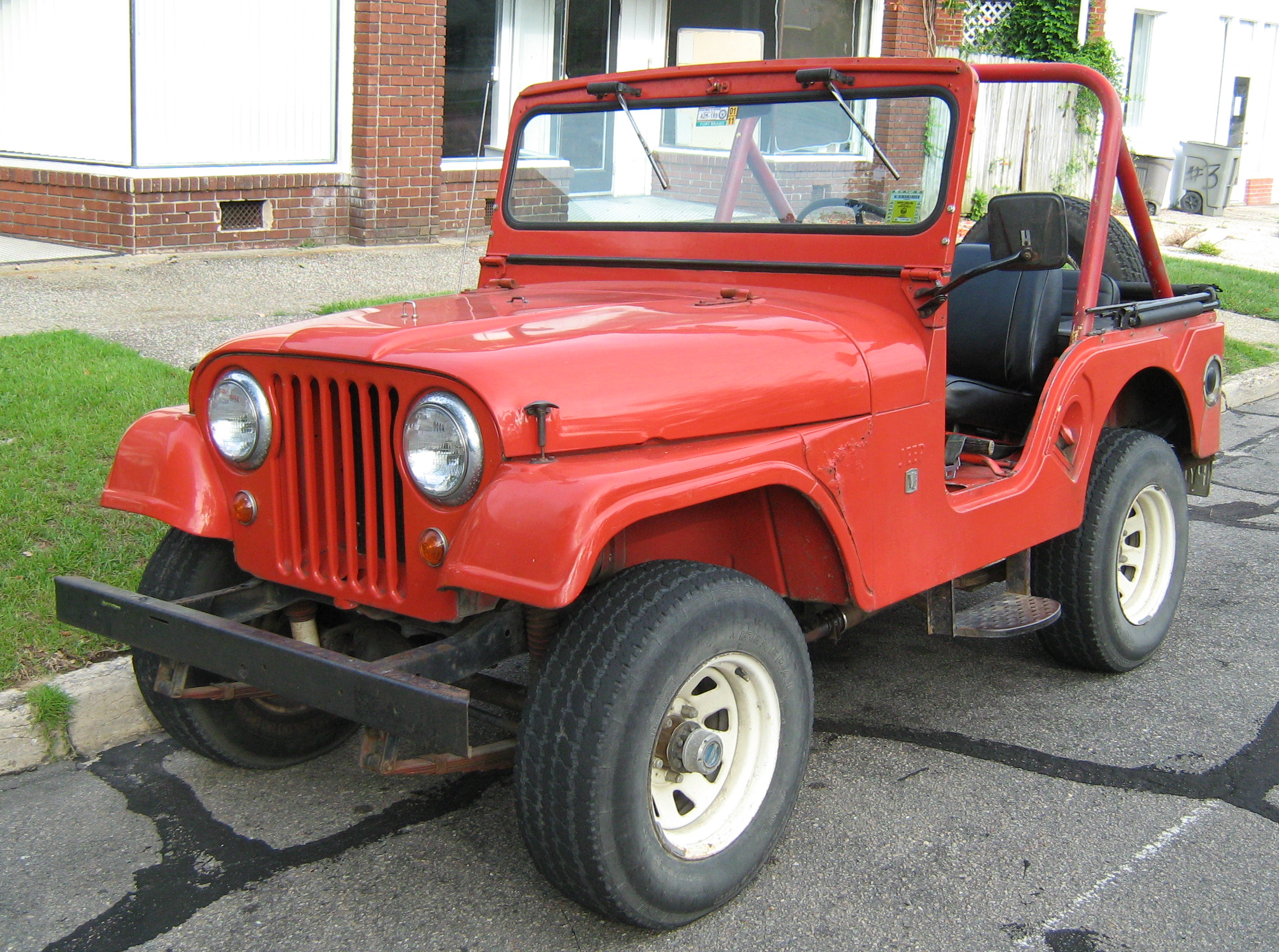

Overview
- Also called: Ford Jeep (Brazil); Jeep Shahbaz (Iran, Pars Khodro); Shinjin Jeep (South Korea)
- Production: 1954–1983; 603,303 produced
- Model years: 1955–1983

Body and chassis
- Related: Jeep DJ-5; Willys M38A1

Powertrain
- Engine: 134 cu in (2.2 L) Willys Hurricane I4; 192 cu in (3.1 L) Perkins 4.192 I4 diesel; 225 cu in (3.7 L) Dauntless V6; 151 cu in (2.5 L) Iron Duke I4; 232 cu in (3.8 L) AMC I6; 258 cu in (4.2 L) AMC I6; 304 cu in (5.0 L) AMC V8
- Transmission: Borg Warner T-90 three-speed manual; Borg Warner T-14 three-speed manual; Borg Warner T-18 four-speed manual

Dimensions
- Wheelbase: 81 in (2,057 mm) (1954-1971); 83.5 in (2,121 mm) (1972-1983)
- Length: 138.2 in (3,510 mm)
- Width: 68.5 in (1,740 mm)
- Height: 67.7 in (1,720 mm)
- Curb weight: 2,665 lb (1,209 kg)

The Willys CJ-5 (after 1964 Jeep CJ-5) was influenced by the new corporate owner, Kaiser, and the Korean War M38A1 Jeep. It was intended to replace the CJ-3B, but that model continued in production. The CJ-5 followed the same pattern, continuing production for three decades while three newer models appeared. "The CJ-5 has the distinct honor of being a vehicle that was hard to kill off... equaling the longest production run of note."

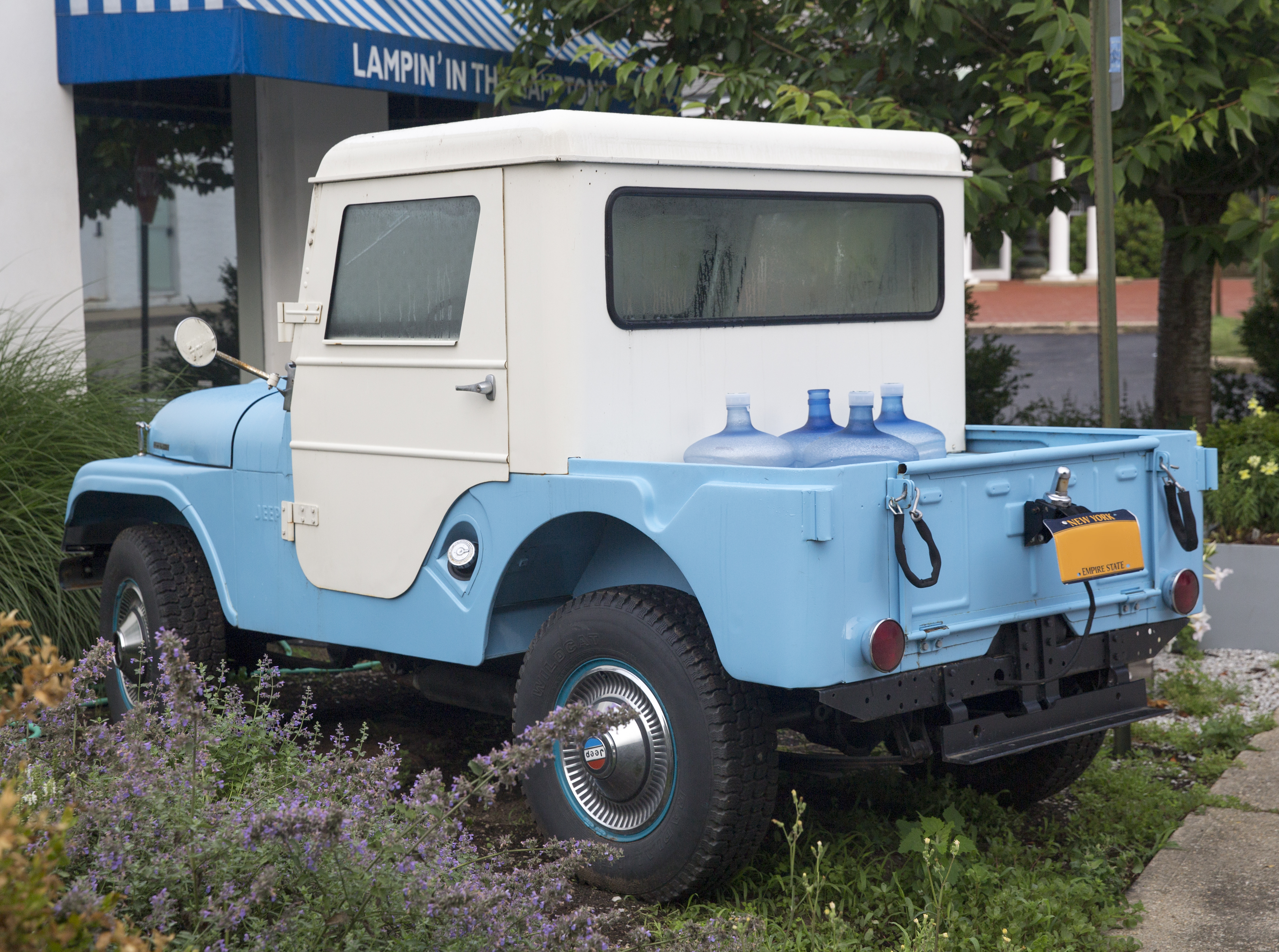
1965 Jeep CJ5-A Tuxedo Park Mark IV half cab

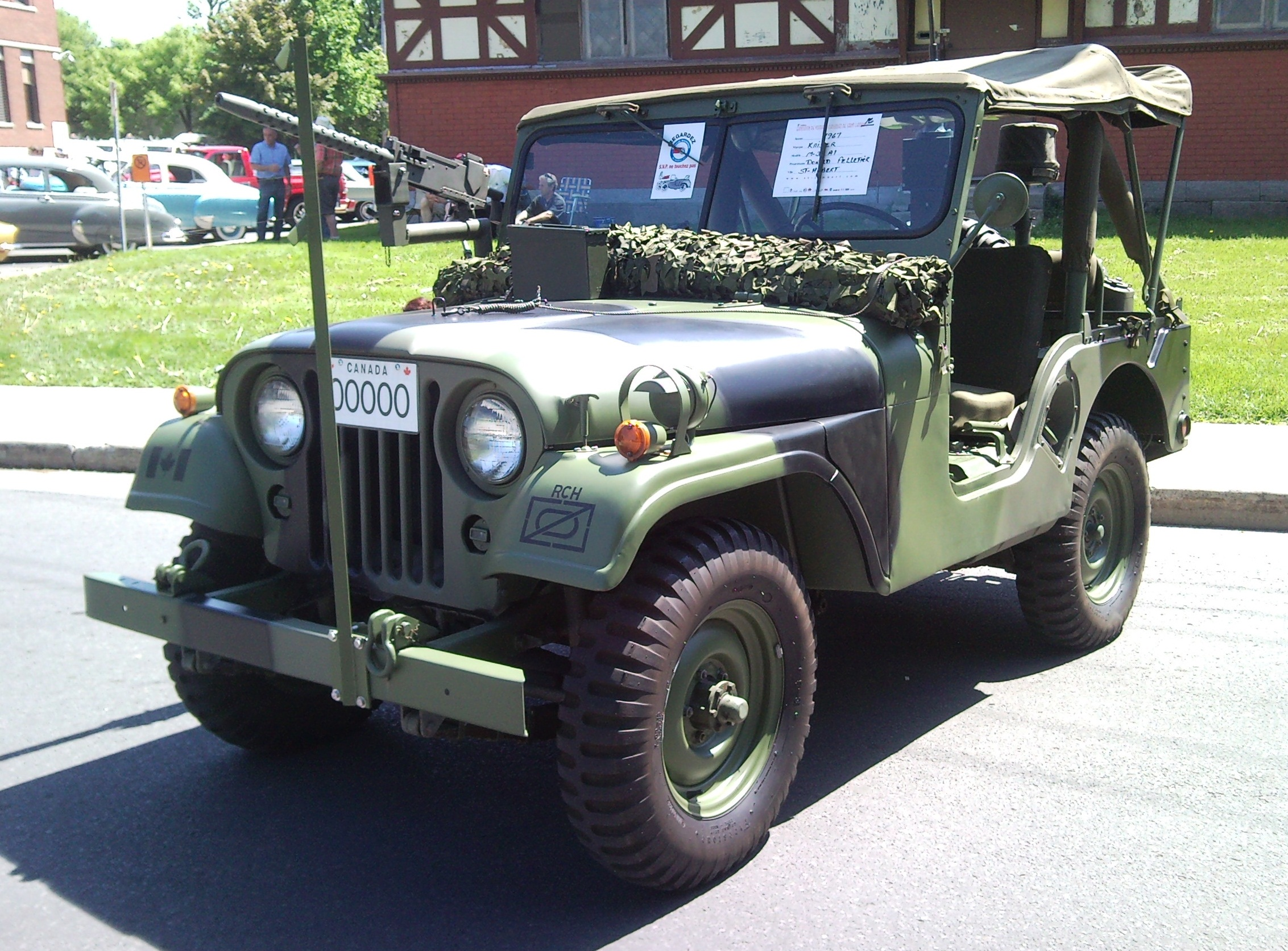
Willys M38A1

From 1961 until 1965, optional for the CJ-5 and CJ-6 was the British-made Perkins 192 cu in (3.15 L) Diesel I4 with 62 hp (46 kW) at 3,000 rpm and 143 lb/ft (213 kg/m) at 1350 rpm.

In 1965, Kaiser bought license to produce the Buick 225 cu in (3.7 L) V6 Dauntless engine, to offer the new 155 hp (116 kW) option on the CJ-5 and CJ-6, countering complaints that the 75 hp four-cylinder Willys Hurricane engine was underpowered. Power steering was an $81 option. The V6 engine proved so popular that, by 1968, some 75% of CJ-5s were sold with it.

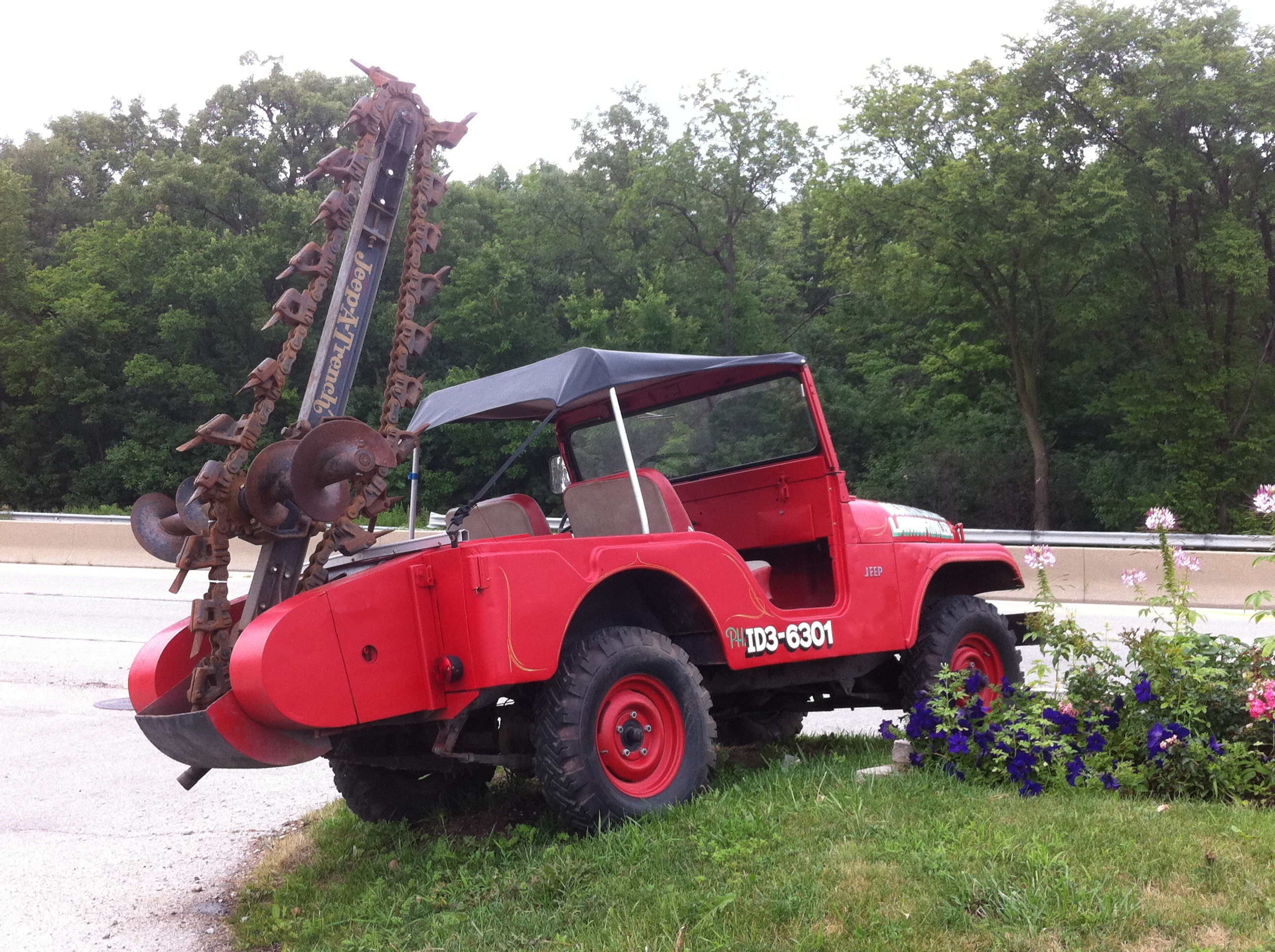
CJ-5 with the "Jeep-A-Trench" accessory

Kaiser Jeep was sold to American Motors Corporation (AMC) in 1970, and the Buick engine was retired after the 1971 model year. (GM's Buick division repurchased the engine tooling in the early 1970s, which served as the powerplant in several GM vehicles.) The "Trac-Lok" limited-slip differential replaced the "Powr-Lok" in 1971, and PTOs were no longer available after that year. AMC began marketing the Jeep less as a universal utility vehicle, and more as a sporty one, notably increasing its performance and features.

1972 Revamp
The 1972 model year brought significant changes to the CJ-5. American Motors began fitting its own engines, which also required changes to both body and chassis. AMC replaced the base Willys 4-cylinder with its Torque Command straight-6 engines, giving the entry-level CJ-5 the power of the previously optional Buick V6. Standard became the 232 cu in (3.8 L), and optional the 258 cu in (4.2 L), which was standard in California. Both engines used a one-barrel Carter YF carburetor. Also in 1972, AMC's 304 cu in (5.0 L) V8 engine became available, which upgraded the power-to-weight ratio to a level comparable to a V8 muscle-car. Other drive-train changes included a new front axle - a full-floating, open-knuckle Dana 30, which was both 25 lbs lighter and reduced the turning circle by 6 ft.

To accommodate the new engines, the wheelbase was stretched by 2.5 in (64 mm), and the fenders and hood were stretched by 5 in (127 mm). A new box-frame was fitted, featuring six cross-members for more rigidity. Also, a larger fuel tank was mounted, moved from under the driver's seat to under the rear, between the frame rails.

A dealer-installed radio became available in 1973, and air conditioning became available via dealership in 1975. Electronic, breakerless distributors replaced breaker-point Delco distributors for the full engine line-up, and a catalytic converter was added to models equipped with the 304 V8.

In 1975, for the 1976 model year, the tub and frame were modified from earlier versions. The frame went from a partially open channel/boxed frame with riveted crossmembers, to majoritively boxed with welded crossmembers, and from parallel rails to widening fore to aft to benefit stability. and the body tub became more rounded. The windshield frame and windshield angle also changed, meaning the tops for the 1955 through 1975 model years differ from the 1976 through 1983 CJ-5 versions. The rear axle also changed in 1976 from a Dana 44 to an AMC-manufactured model 20 with a larger-diameter ring gear, but it used a two-piece axleshaft/hub assembly instead of the one-piece design used in the Dana.

For 1977, the frame was modified again to a completely boxed unit. Power disc brakes and the "Golden Eagle" package (which included a tachometer and clock) were new options, as well as air conditioning.

In 1979, the standard engine became the 258 cu in (4.2 L) I6 that now featured a Carter BBD two-barrel carburetor.

From 1980 through 1983, the CJ-5 came standard with a "Hurricane"-branded version of the GM Iron Duke I4 with an SR4 close-ratio, four-speed manual transmission. The 258 cu in (4.2 L) AMC straight-6 engine remained available as an option, but the transmission was changed from the Tremec T-150 three-speed to a Tremec T-176 close-ratio four-speed. The Dana 30 front axle was retained, but the locking hubs were changed to a five-bolt retaining pattern versus the older six-bolt.

The demise of the AMC CJ5 model is often attributed to a December 1980 60 Minutes segment in which the Insurance Institute for Highway Safety (IIHS) staged a demonstration to show that the CJ5 was apt to roll over "in routine road circumstances at relatively low speeds." Years later, it was revealed that the testers achieved only eight rollovers out of 435 runs through a corner. The IIHS asked the testers to implement "vehicle loading" (hanging weights in the vehicle's corners inside the body, where they were not visible to the camera) to create worst-case stability conditions.

=== Special CJ-5 versions ===
- 1961 Tuxedo Park
- 1962 Tuxedo Park Mark II
- 1963 Tuxedo Park Mark III
- 1964 Tuxedo Park Mark IV

The early Tuxedo Park models were trim lines designed to make the CJ "more comfortable and appealing to the general public." However, the Tuxedo Park Mark IV was claimed as a separate model from the other CJ series (marked in 1965 as the "Universal"), with more differences than past models. The Tuxedo Park Mark IV was an attempt to crack the mass market; it was, according to Jeep, “a new idea in sports cars ... the sportiest, most FUNctional car on the automotive scene." It added to the standard CJ chrome-plated bumpers, hood latches, gas cap, mirror, and taillight trim. Two wheelbases, 81 in (2,057 mm) and 101 in (2,565 mm), were available, with a variety of convertible top and seat colors, and front bucket seats upholstered in "pleated British calf-grain vinyl". Sales of this model, introduced in 1965, were low.

- 1969–1970 Camper

From 1969, Kaiser-Jeep offered a camper for the CJ-5 as a factory option, but also available separately, as it would fit any CJ-5 made since 1955. The camper mounted in the "bed" of the CJ-5, extended well beyond the back of the car, and had another axle of its own that carried most of the weight. It also extended above the front seats of a CJ-5, which is where the main sleeper was located. When AMC bought Kaiser-Jeep in 1970, they ended the Jeep camper option. With only 336 produced, the Jeep Camper is one of the rarest commercial RV models ever.

- 1969 462

The 1969 Universal offered a "462" performance package. It was a limited-production model that featured the V6 engine, front bucket seats, and a rear bench, roll bar, heavy-duty frame and springs, a locking differential, oil-pan skid plate, rear swing-out tire carrier, full wheel covers, ammeter, and oil pressure gauges; padded visors were optional.

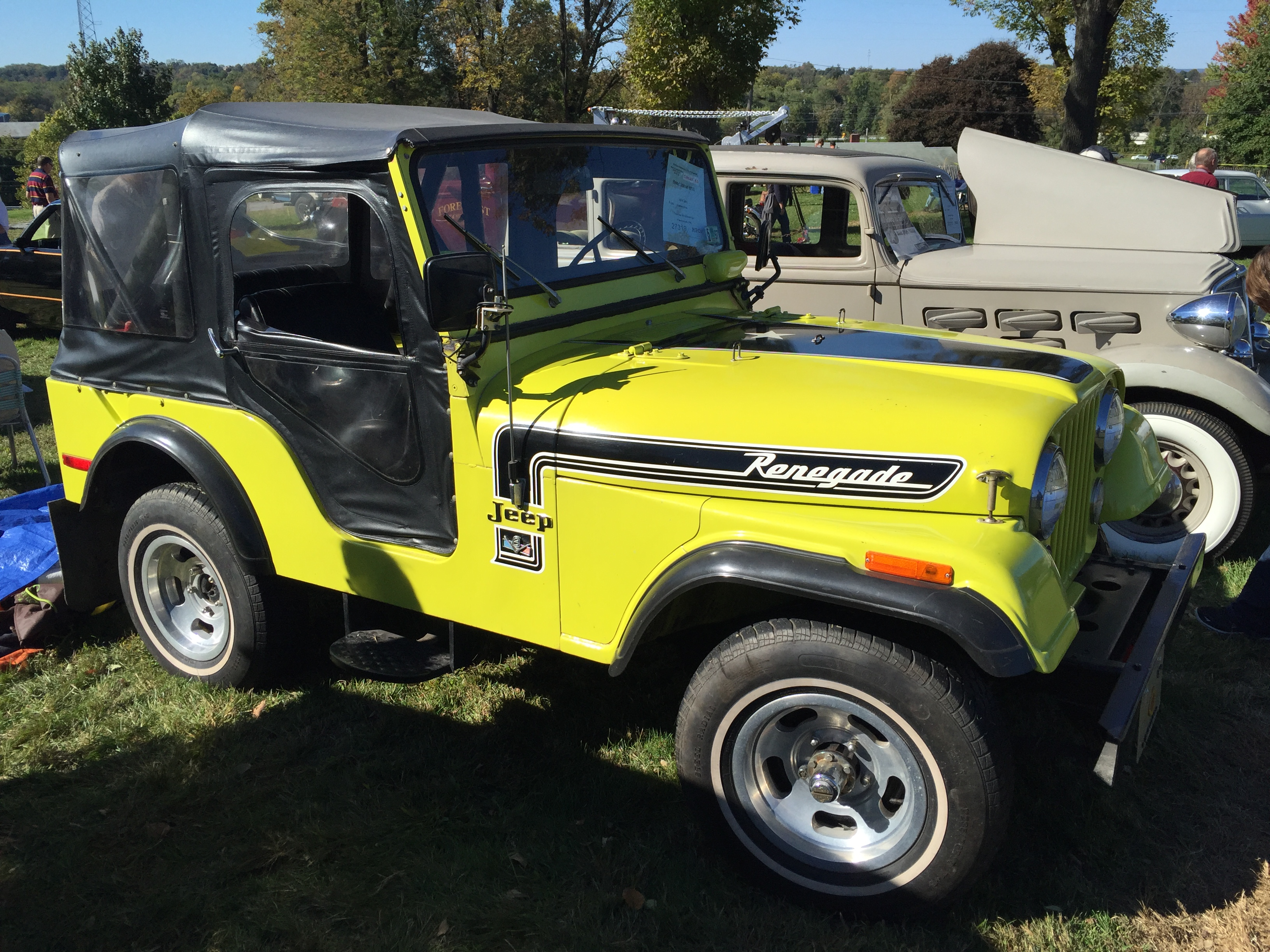
1974 Jeep CJ-5 Renegade

- 1970 Renegade I

The 1970 "Renegade I" models continued the features of the "462" package, along with special hood trim stripes and limited colors. Renegade I production for 1970 is estimated between 250 and 500 units equipped with all of the previous performance upgrades along with a simple black stripe on the sides of the hood, new 8-inch wide white road wheels with G70x15 tires, and offered in only two bright colors: Wild Plum and Mint Green. Note that there may have been other colors produced including a pale yellow produced in October of 1969.

- 1971 Renegade II

The 1971 "Renegade II" continued the previous year's features with bright alloy road wheels (replacing the painted steel units), the addition of a black center hood stripe, and new color selections: about 200 were painted Baja Yellow, 200 Mint Green, 50 Riverside Orange, and 150 finished in Big Bad Orange, the same paint as available on the "Big Bad" AMC AMX and Javelin. The AMC design studios proposed a striping scheme for a Renegade III model for the 1972 model year, but because of their popularity, the Renegade became a regular production appearance package option.

- 1972–1983 Renegade

The 1972 "Renegade" was available from 1972 until 1983 with AMC's 304 cu in (5.0 L) V8 engine, alloy wheels, and a Trac-Lok limited-slip differential.

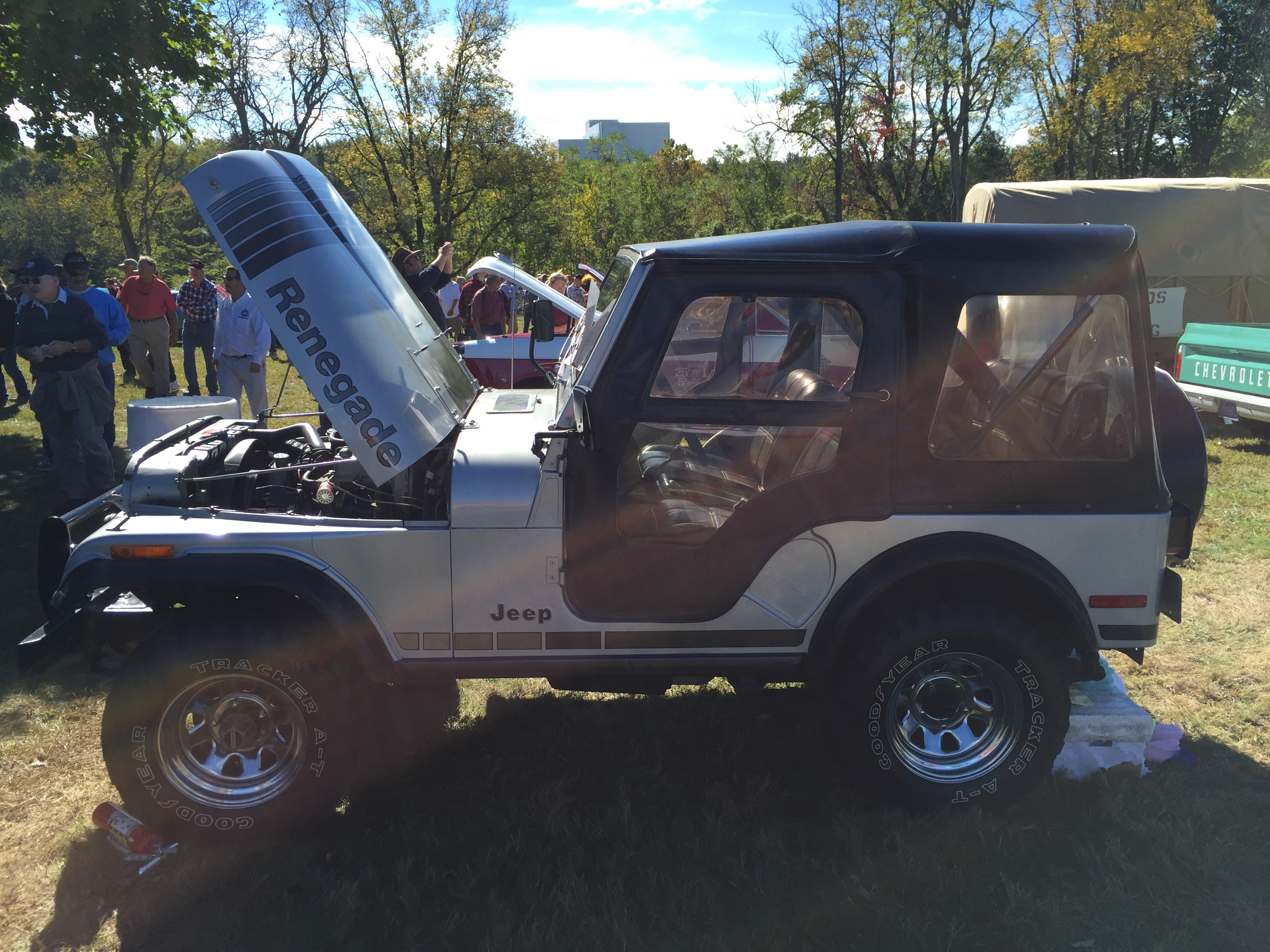
1979 Jeep CJ Silver Anniversary edition, lengthened nose as compared to pre-1972 models

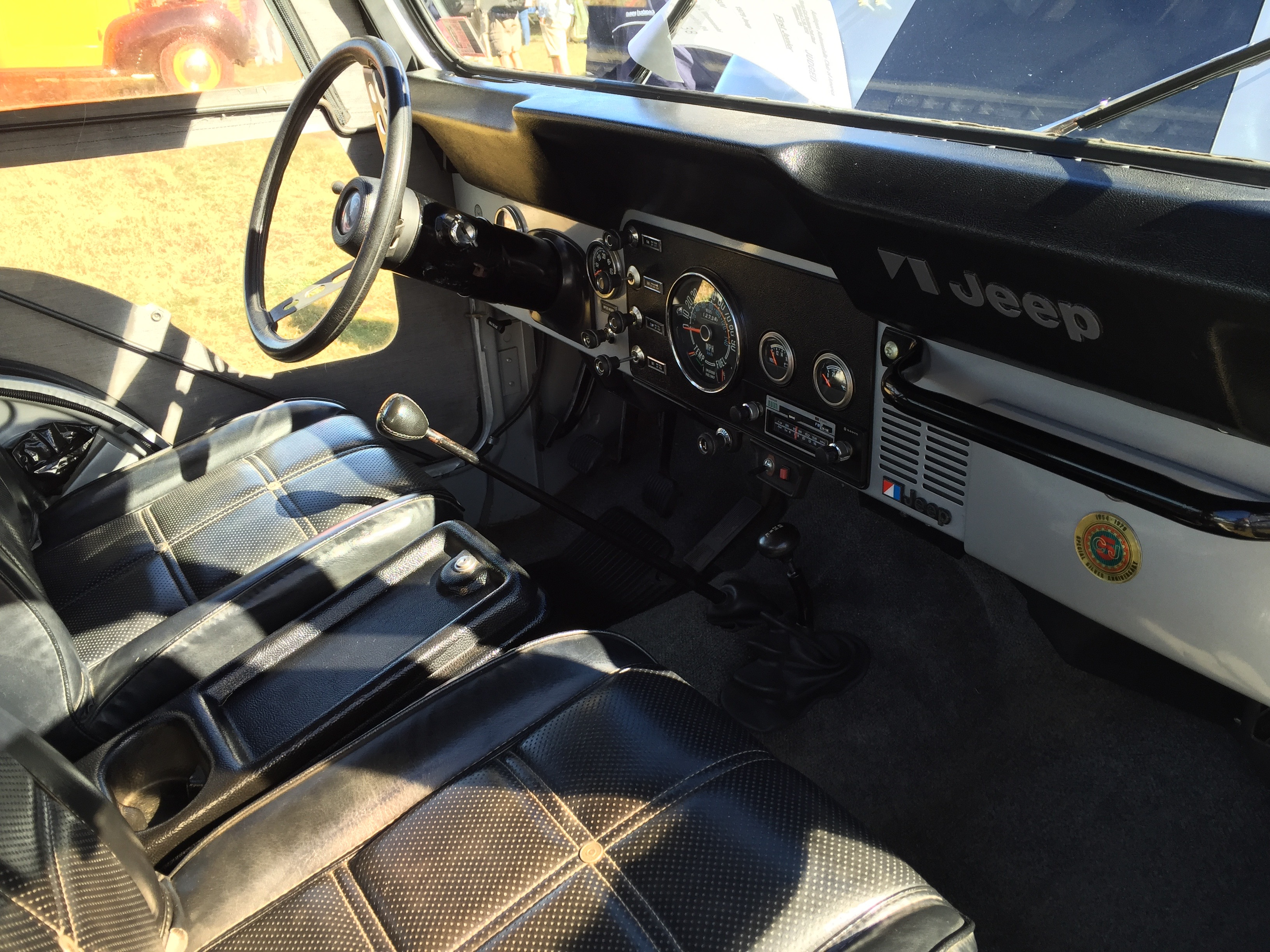
1979 Jeep CJ Silver Anniversary edition interior

- 1973 Super Jeep

Only produced in 1973, the Super Jeep was an appearance package created because of a shortage of aluminum wheels needed for the CJ-5 Renegade versions. Only a few hundred were built.

- 1977–1983 Golden Eagle

From 1977 through 1983, the Golden Eagle package came with a soft-top or hard-top option, power disc brakes, power steering, tachometer, 304 CID V8, air conditioning, side steps, and Golden Eagle decals.

- 1979 Silver Anniversary

The 1979 Silver Anniversary edition was a limited-edition version (1000 units) of the Renegade model, marketed to celebrate 25 years of the CJ-5. Features included a special "Quick Silver" metallic paint, black to silver accent body striping, and special Renegade decals on the hood sides, black soft top, special spare tire cover, black vinyl bucket seats, and a dashboard plaque noting the CJ's production from 1954 until 1979.

- 1980 Golden Hawk — a 1980-only sticker package for CJ-5, CJ-7 and Cherokee.
- 1980-1983 Laredo

=== Australia ===
In Australia, a unique variant of the CJ5/CJ6 was produced in limited numbers. In 1965, when the CJ was given the all-new Buick V6, Jeep saw the need for something similar in Australia. So, they began to fit Australian Ford Falcon 6-cylinder engines to them at their Rocklea factory in Queensland. The Jeep was fitted with an engine, pedal box, and clutch/brake system corresponding to the equivalent Falcon at the time; a 1965 CJ5 would be fitted with 1965 Falcon engine/clutch components. Combat 6 jeeps were also fitted with Australian Borg Warner differentials and Borg Warner-brand gearboxes. Very little documentation about these Jeeps remains, and often the only way to conclusively identify them is by owner history.

=== Brazil ===
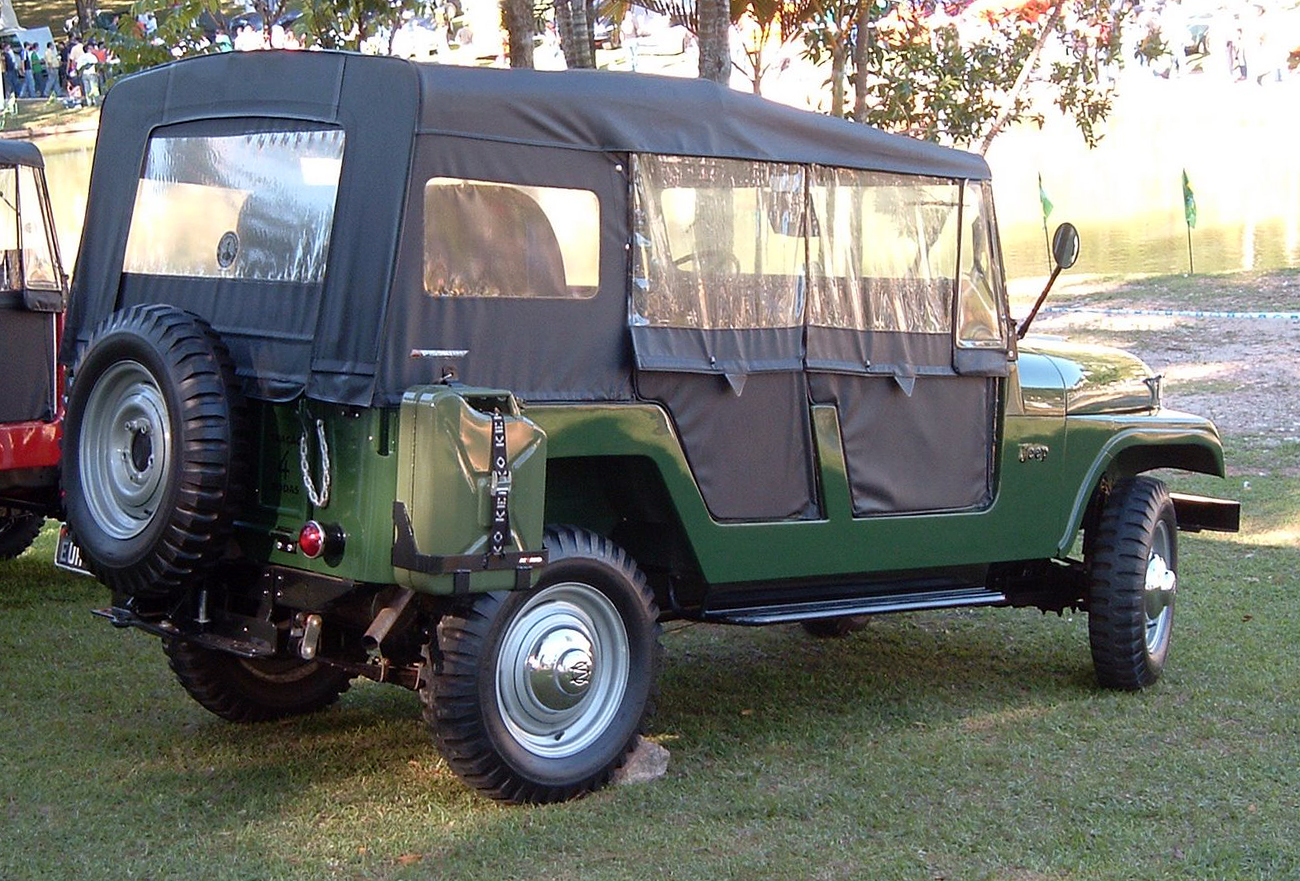
1961 Willys Jeep 101 4 portas (aka "Bernardão")

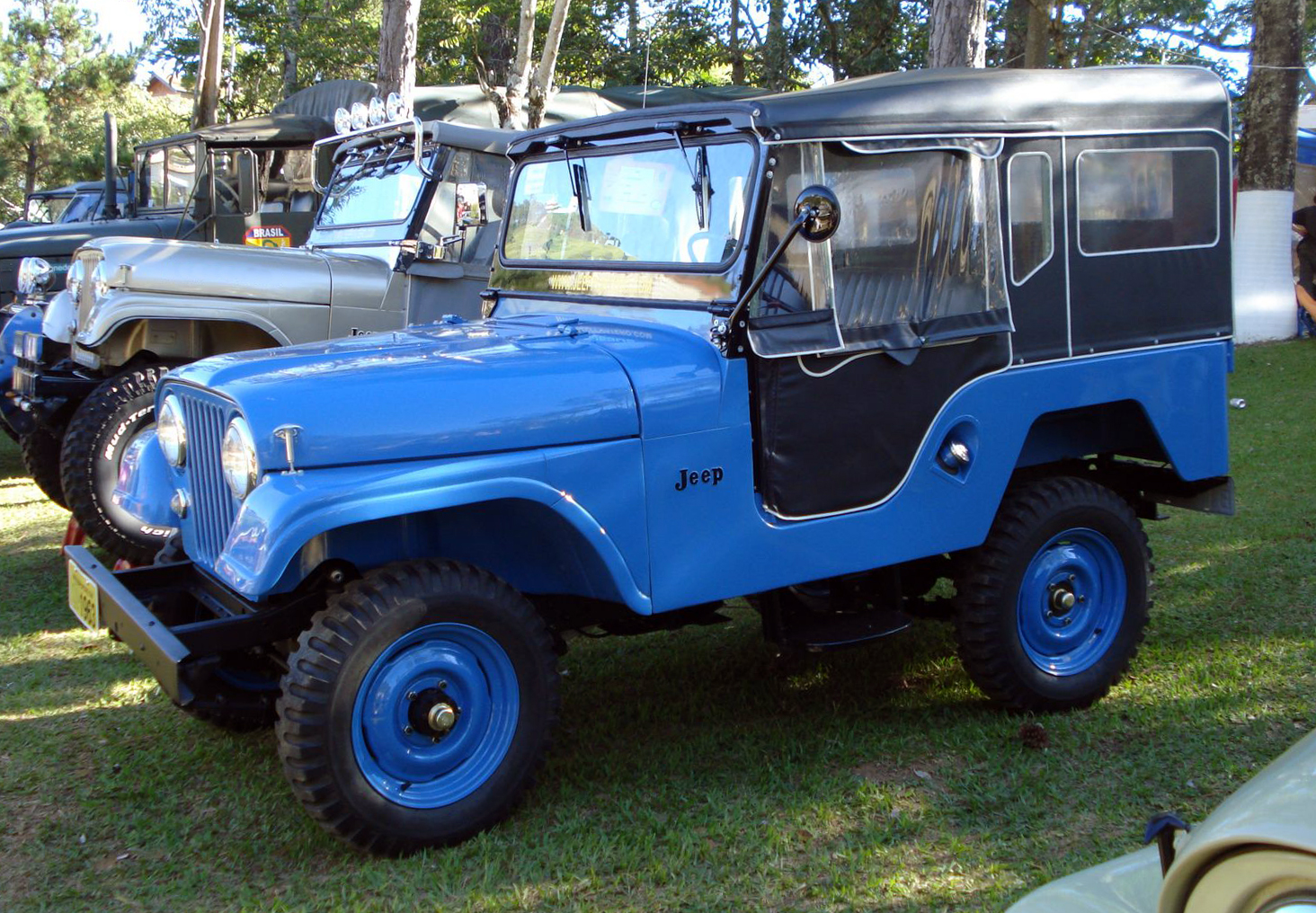
1963 Brazilian-built CJ-5

While most foreign assemblers focused on the CJ-3B, Brazil received the CJ-5 instead. After closing its market to imported cars in 1954, Brazil began assembling the "Willys Jeep Universal" (as it was known in Brazil) from CKD kits in 1957. By 1958, production relied on locally sourced components, with the vehicles equipped with a 90 hp (67 kW) 2.6 liter I6 engine (also used by Willys do Brasil for passenger cars). The Universals came with a three-speed manual transmission. The Brazilian-built vehicles are easily recognized by their squared-off rear wheel openings. In 1961, a long-wheelbase version, similar to the CJ-6, was added to the line. Called the "Willys Jeep 101", it shared the chassis of the local Rural, a redesigned Willys Jeep Station Wagon. Like the Brazilian-made CJ5s, the 101 has square rear-wheel openings. This version was introduced in 1961, but was not retained after Ford's takeover in the fall of 1967. On 9 October 1967, Ford do Brasil bought the Brazilian Willys subsidiary and took over the production of the CJ-5, the Willys Jeep Station Wagon-based "Rural", and its pick-up truck version. Ford kept the line with no modifications except for some Ford badges on the sides and on the tailgate. In 1976, Ford equipped the CJ-5 and the Rural with the locally built version of the 2.3-L OHC four-cylinder engine used in the Ford Pinto (also used in the Brazilian Maverick) and a four-speed manual transmission. This engine produced 91 PS (67 kW; 90 hp) (SAE) at 5000 rpm. In 1980, the engine was modified to run on Neat ethanol fuel (E100); this option lasted until 1983, when Ford ended the production of the CJ-5 in Brazil.

== CJ-6 ==
Willys CJ-6/Jeep CJ-6
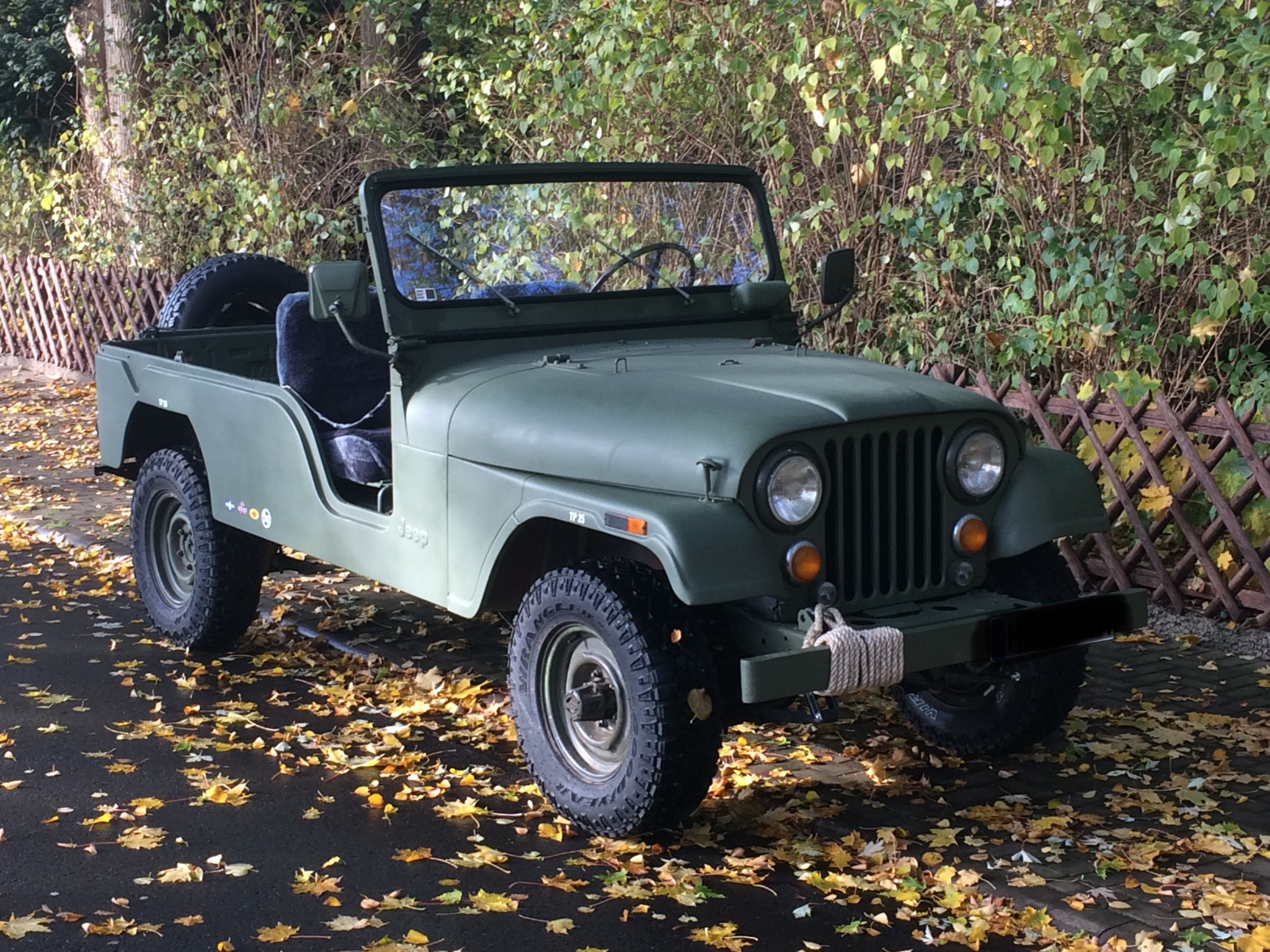

Overview
- Production: 1955–1981

Body and chassis
- Related: Willys M170

Powertrain
- Engine: 134 cu in (2.2 L) Willys Hurricane I4; 225 cu in (3.7 L) Dauntless V6; 151 cu in (2.5 L) GM Iron Duke I4; 232 cu in (3.8 L) AMC I6; 258 cu in (4.2 L) AMC I6; 304 cu in (5.0 L) AMC V8; 192 cu in (3.1 L) Perkins 4.192 I4 diesel

Dimensions
- Wheelbase: 101 in (2,565 mm) (1955–1971); 103.5 in (2,629 mm) (1972–1981)

Introduced in 1953 as the military M170 jeep ambulance, the civilian Willys Jeep CJ-6 debuted in 1955 as a 1956 model. It is a version of the CJ-5, stretched by 20 in (51 cm), giving it a longer wheelbase of 101 in (2.57 m) from 1955 to 1971, and 103.5 in (2.63 m) from 1972 to 1981. The extended chassis allowed various configurations, including adding a second row of seats. The M170 military version shared many features with the M38A1 (Military CJ-5), but had the passenger-door opening extended back to the rear wheel well. As in the CJ-5, the V6 and V8 engine choices appeared in 1965 and 1972.

The U.S. Forest Service also used CJ-6 Jeeps. American sales ended after 1975, with the introduction of the CJ-7. A total of 50,172 were produced when the series went out of production in 1981.

Never very popular in the United States, most of CJ-6 production was exported to Sweden and South America. It was also assembled in South Africa, by Volkswagen's local subsidiary, and in Israel, by Kaiser in Haifa and later by Automotive Industries Ltd. in northern Nazareth (now Nof HaGalil). In Brazil, a local 4-door option was available from 1961 to 1966, called "Jeep Universal 101 Bernardão 4 portas".

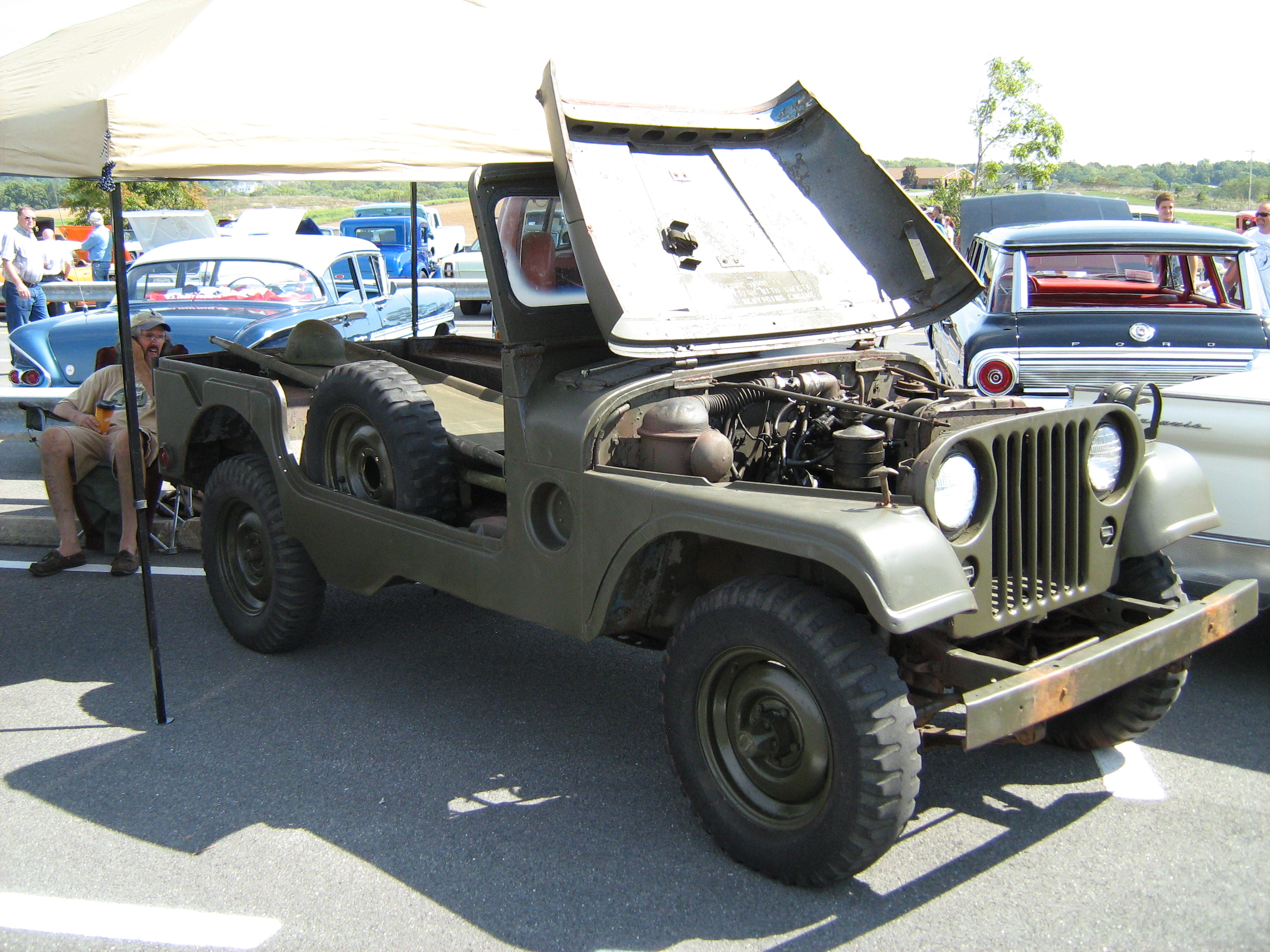
M170, showing a larger opening that extends from the cowl back to the rear wheel.

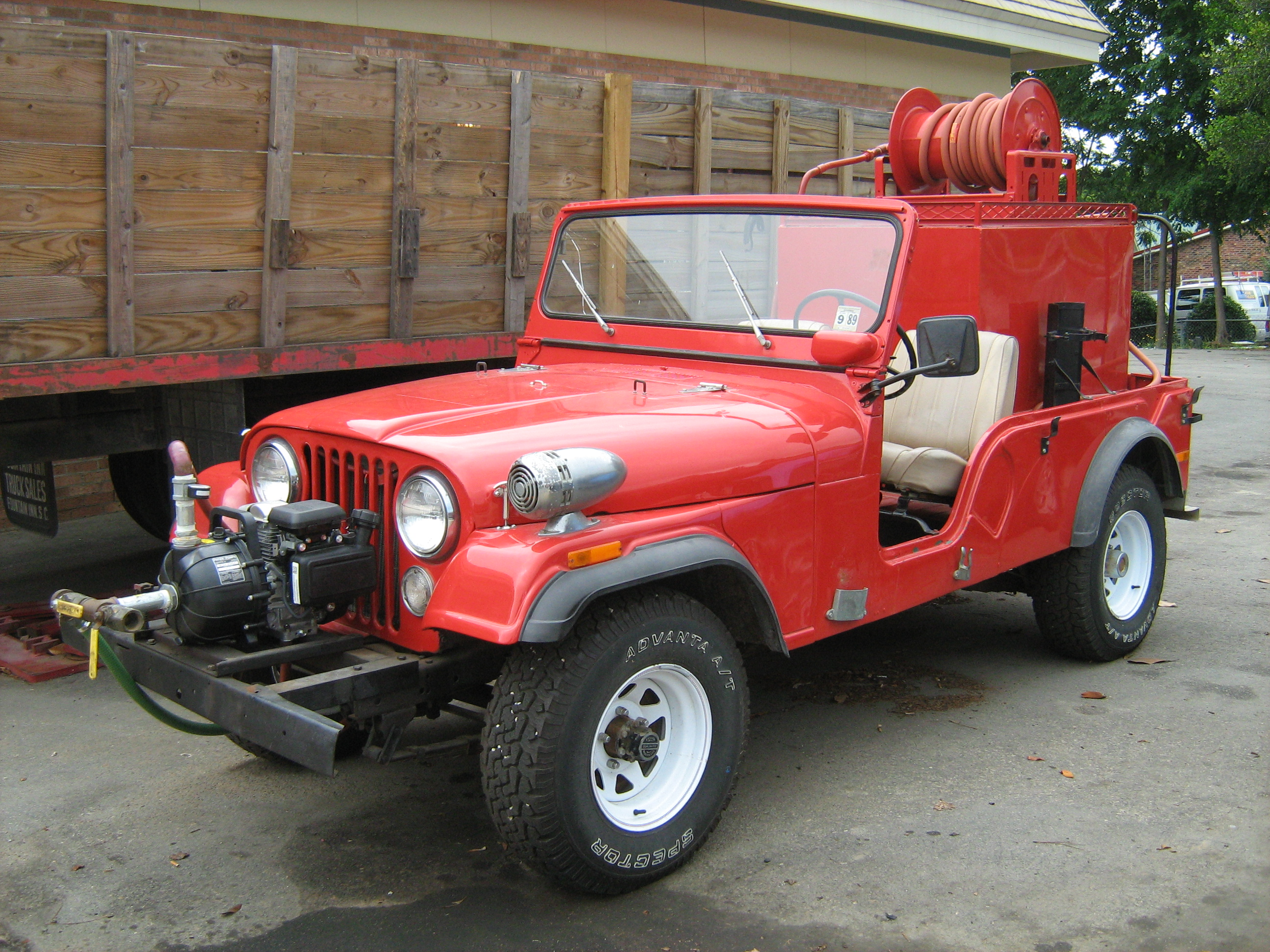
1975 Jeep CJ-6 fire engine, showing a smaller opening similar to other CJ models and shorter than on the M170.

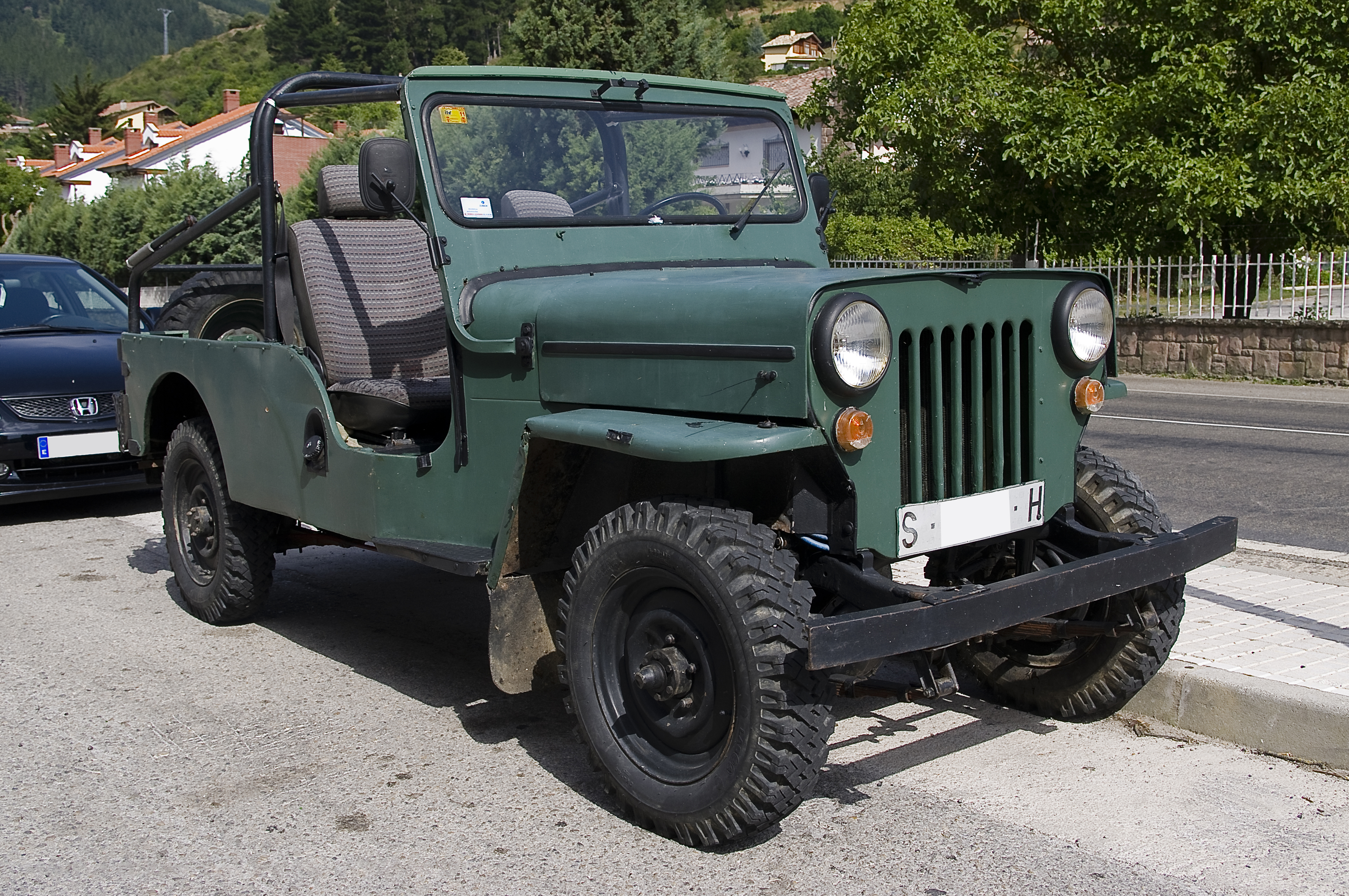
1979 Jeep-VIASA CJ-6, built with CJ-3B front end (Spain).

== CJ-5A and CJ-6A ==
CJ-5A & CJ-6A

Overview
- Production: 1964–1968

From 1964 until 1968, Kaiser elevated the Tuxedo Park from a trim package to a separate model for the CJ-5A and CJ-6A. A Tuxedo Park Mark IV is identified by a different prefix than a standard CJ-5, with a VIN prefix of 8322; a CJ-6A is 8422, while a standard CJ-5 VIN prefix is 8305 from 1964 through 1971.

== CJ-7 ==
Jeep CJ-7
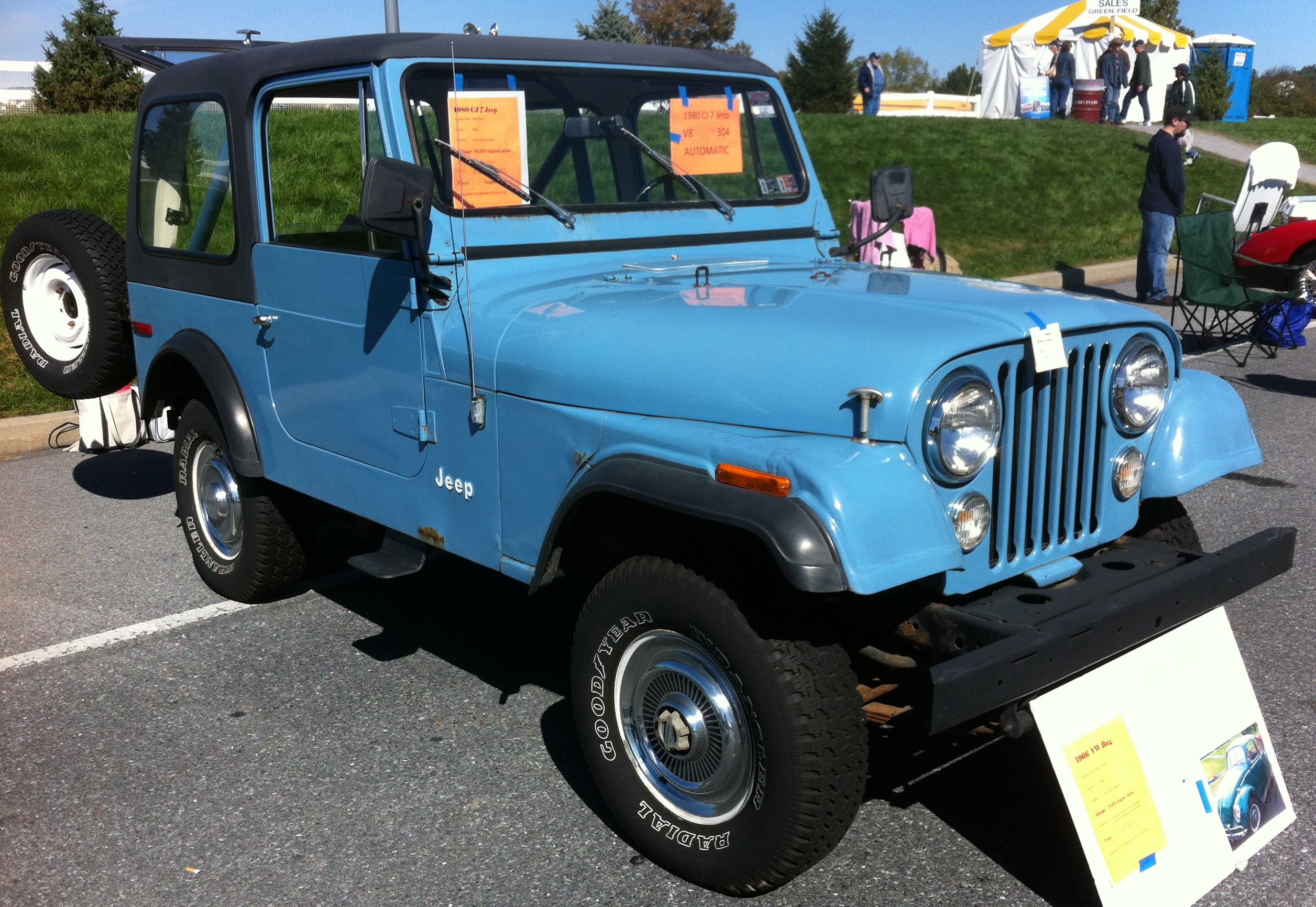

Overview
- Model years: 1976–1986

Body and chassis
- Related: SsangYong Korando

Powertrain
- Engine: 150 cu in (2.5 L) AMC I4; 151 cu in (2.5 L) Iron Duke I4; 232 cu in (3.8 L) AMC I6; 258 cu in (4.2 L) AMC I6; 304 cu in (5.0 L) AMC V8; 145 cu in (2.4 L) Isuzu C240 I4 diesel
- Transmission: 3-speed automatic; 3-speed manual; 4-speed manual; 5-speed manual

Dimensions
- Wheelbase: 93.3 in (2,370 mm)
- Length: 148 in (3,759 mm)
- Width: 68.5 in (1,740 mm)
- Height: 67.7 in (1,720 mm)
- Curb weight: 2,707 lb (1,228 kg)

Chronology
- Successor: Jeep Wrangler YJ

The Jeep CJ-7 had a wheelbase 10 inches (25 cm) longer than the CJ-5, with its curved side entry cutouts partially squared to accommodate hinged doors. The other main difference between CJ-5 and CJ-7 was in the chassis, which consisted of two parallel longitudinal main C-section rails. To improve handling and stability, the rear section of the chassis stepped out so the springs and shock absorbers could be mounted closer to the outside of the body. It was introduced for the 1976 model year, with 379,299 built over eleven years of production.

Transmission options included the standard part-time two-speed transfer case, automatic, and an optional new automatic all-wheel drive system called Quadra-Trac. Other features included an optional molded hardtop and steel doors. The CJ-7 was also available in Renegade and Laredo models. Distinguished by their different body decals, the Laredo model featured highback leather bucket seats, a tilting steering wheel, and a chrome package that included the bumpers, front grille cover, and side mirrors. An optional Trak-Lok rear differential was available, too.

The final drive ratios of the CJ-7 were different for each type of engine: the 145 cu in (2.4 L) diesel was mated to the 4.10 ratio axle (in both Renegade and Laredo), while the 258-cubic-inch (4,230 cm^{3}) straight six and 150-cubic-inch (2,500 cm^{3}) four-cylinder used 3.73 and AMC V8 304-powered models (produced 1976–1981, which became part of the Golden Eagle version) used the 3.55 ratio axles.

The Ohio factory made a diesel-powered version for export only. General Motors, the owners of Isuzu Motor Cars, provided the engines. Production of this diesel version ran from 1980 to 1982. This model had the Isuzu C240 engine, T176 transmission, and Dana 300 transfer case, though some were reportedly produced with the Dana 20. Typically, they had 4.1-ratio, narrow-track axles.

From 1976 through 1980, the CJ-7 came equipped with a Dana 20 transfer case, Dana 30 front axle (27- or 31-spline), and a 29-spline AMC 20 rear axle, while in later years, Laredo packages added a tachometer, chrome bumpers, tow hooks, and interior upgrades including leather seats and a clock. In 1980, the Laredo was first fitted with an AMC 20 rear axle until mid-1986, when it was equipped with a Dana 44, and all 1980 and newer CJ-7s came with the Dana 300 transfer case.

The Canadian Army took delivery of 195 militarized CJ-7s in 1985. These were put into service as a stop-gap measure between the retirement of the M38A1 and the introduction of the Bombardier Iltis. The Canadian Forces codified them under Equipment Configuration Code 121526.

The CJ-7 continues to be used in mud racing, with either the stock body or a fiberglass replica. The CJ-7 has been widely used as a favorite for rock crawling, with simple and complex modifications. These last Jeeps also featured a factory dash plaque that read, "Last of a Great Breed - This collectors-edition CJ ends an era that began with the legendary Jeep of World War II".

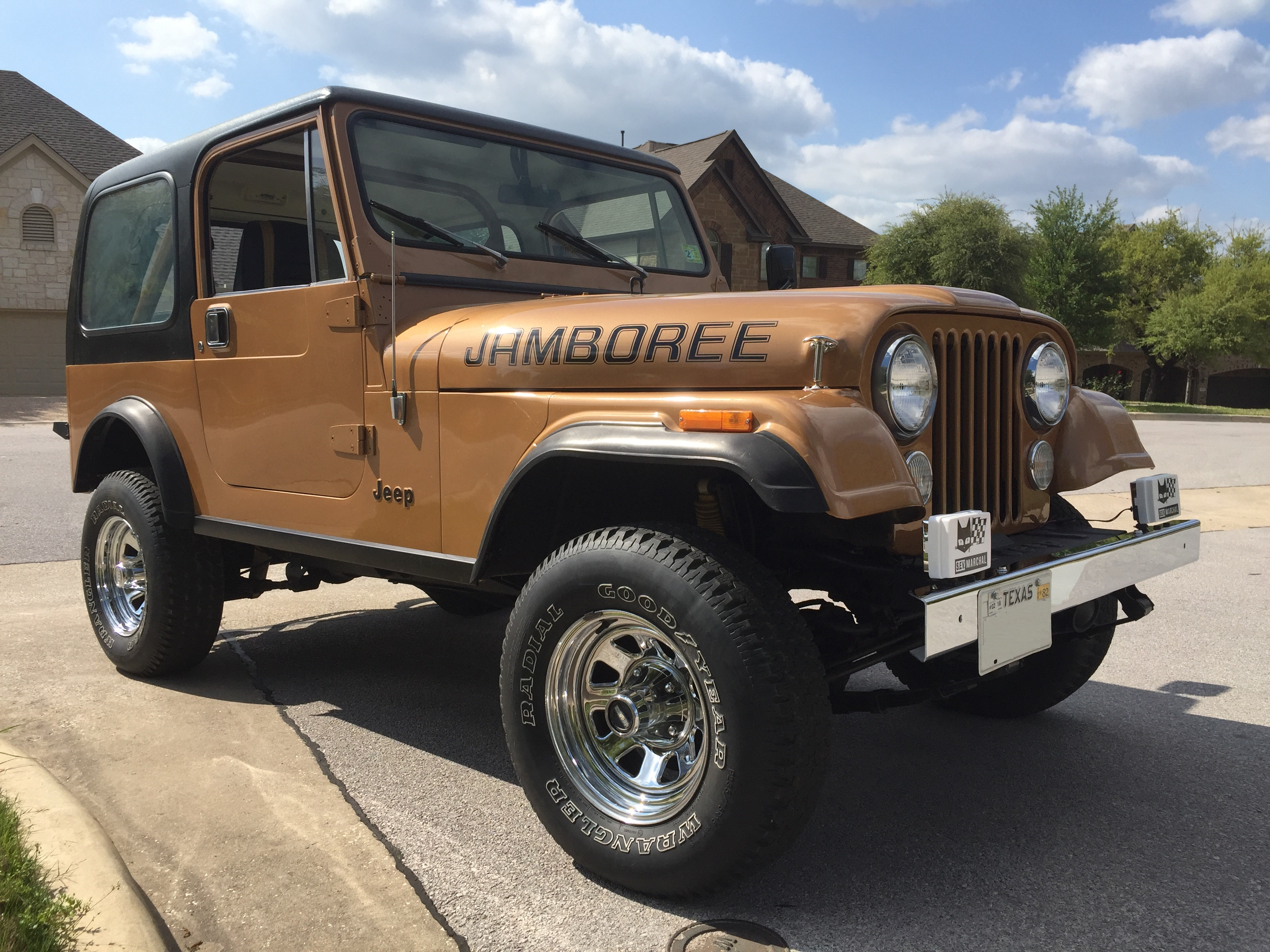
1982 Jamboree Edition #0152 — Topaz Gold Metallic

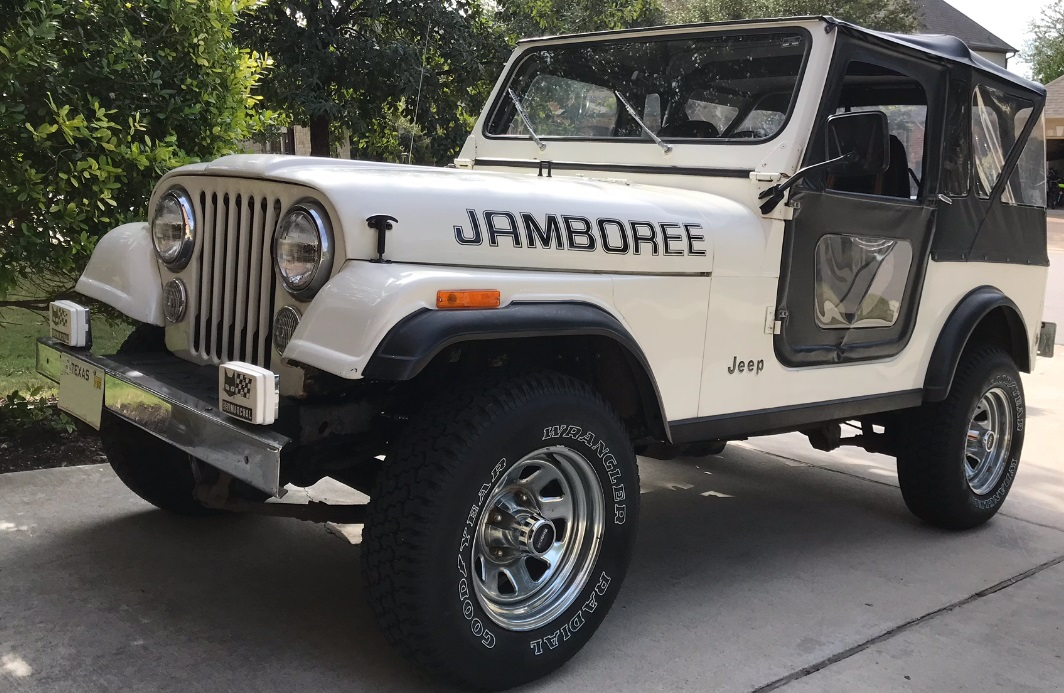
1982 Jamboree Edition #0693 — Olympic White

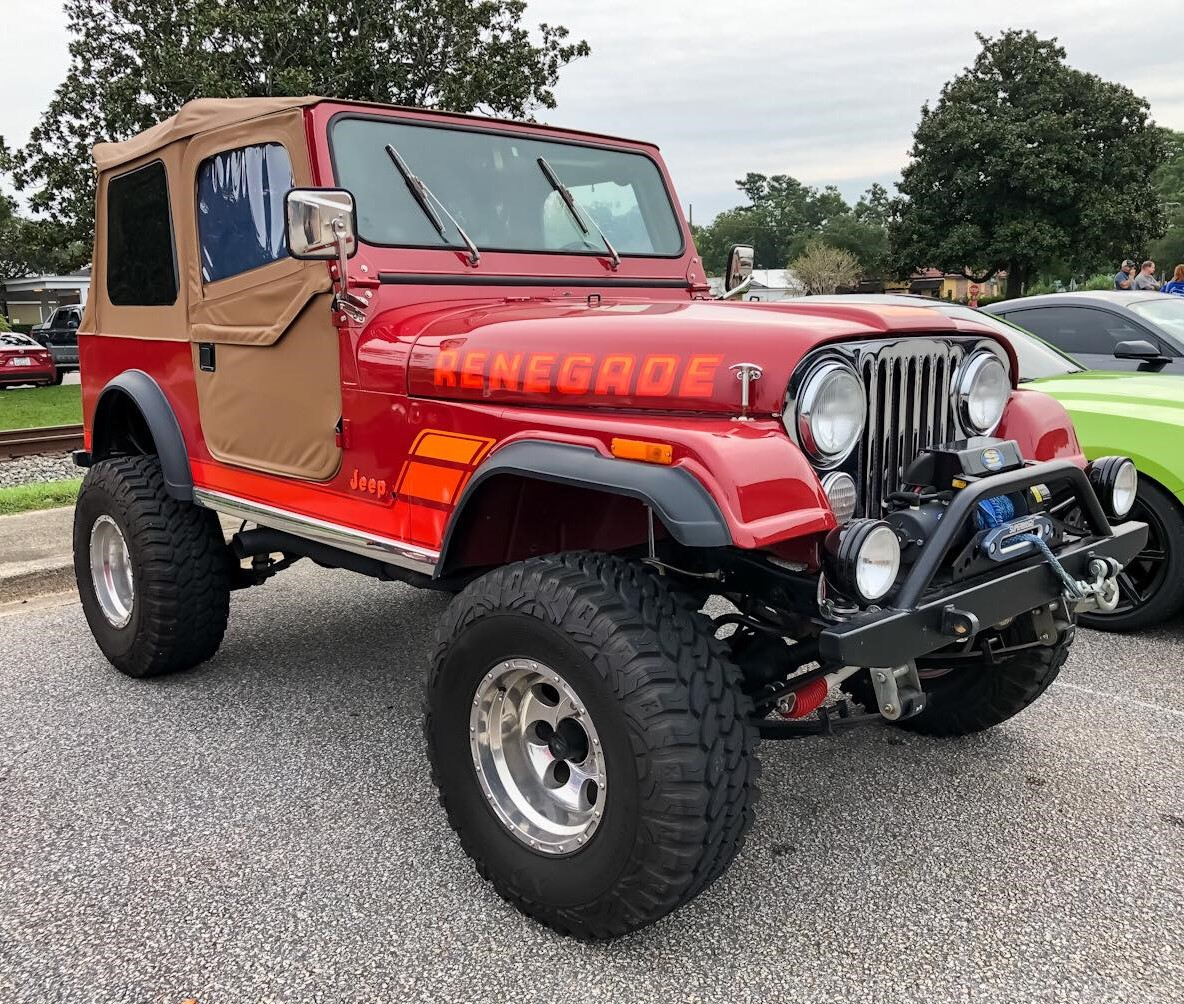
Jeep Renegade

During 11 years of production, the CJ-7 had various common trim packages:

- 1976-1986 Renegade (2.4D L6-2.5-4.2-5.0 AMC 304 V8)
- 1977-1980 Golden Eagle (5.0 AMC 304 V8)
- 1980 Golden Hawk (5.0 AMC 304 V8)
- 1980-1986 Laredo (2.4D-4.2 I6)

Jeep also produced two special edition CJ-7 packages:

- 1982-1983 Limited (2,500 units were built as a limited-production luxury model; 4.2 L I6 with T5 or automatic transmissions)
- 1982 Jamboree Commemorative Edition (630 numbered units built for the 30th anniversary of the Rubicon Trail; 4.2L). With only 630 units produced (560 Topaz Gold Metallic and 70 Olympic White), the CJ-7 Jamboree is the rarest CJ-7 ever built and one of the rarest Jeeps of all time. The Jamboree is in the same production rarity class as the 1971 CJ-5 Renegade-II. It is the most heavily optioned CJ ever built; it was the Rubicon of its day. All units were uniquely numbered via a dash plaque; it is the only numbered AMC Jeep.

Engines

- 150 cu in (2.5 L) AMC I4
- 151 cu in (2.5 L) GM Iron Duke I4
- 232 cu in (3.8 L) AMC I6
- 258 cu in (4.2 L) AMC I6 99.4 PS (73 kW; 98 hp), 261 N⋅m (193 lb⋅ft)
- 304 cu in (5.0 L) AMC V8 127 PS (93 kW; 125 hp), 296 N⋅m (218 lb⋅ft)
- 145 cu in (2.4 L) Isuzu Diesel C240

Transmissions

- Warner T-18 (four-speed with a Dana 20, 1976-1979) (aftermarket adapters exist for a Dana 300, but it was not a factory option) (also known as a three-speed with granny gear)
- Borg-Warner T-4 (four-speed with a Dana 300)
- Borg-Warner T-5 (five-speed with a Dana 300)
- Tremec T-150 (three-speed manual transmission with a Dana 20, 1976-1979)
- Tremec T-176 (four-speed manual with a Dana 300)
- Borg-Warner SR-4 (four-speed with a Dana 300)
- GM TH-400 (three-speed automatic with BW QuadraTrac #1339)
- TF-999 (three-speed automatic transmission - 4.2 L with a Dana 300)
- TF-904 (three-speed automatic transmission - 2.5 L with a Dana 300)

Transfer cases

- Dana 20 (1976–1979)
- Dana 300 (1980–1986)
- Borg-Warner #1339 (1976–1979)

Axles

- Dana 30 Front narrow track (1976–1981)
- Dana 30 Front wide track (1982–1986)
- 2-Piece AMC 20 Narrow track rear (1976–1981)
- 2-Piece AMC 20 Narrow track offset differential rear (1976–1979) only for QuadraTrac #1339-equipped vehicles
- 2-Piece AMC 20 Wide track rear (1982–1986)
- Dana 44 Wide track rear (mid-year 1986)

== Scrambler (CJ-8) ==
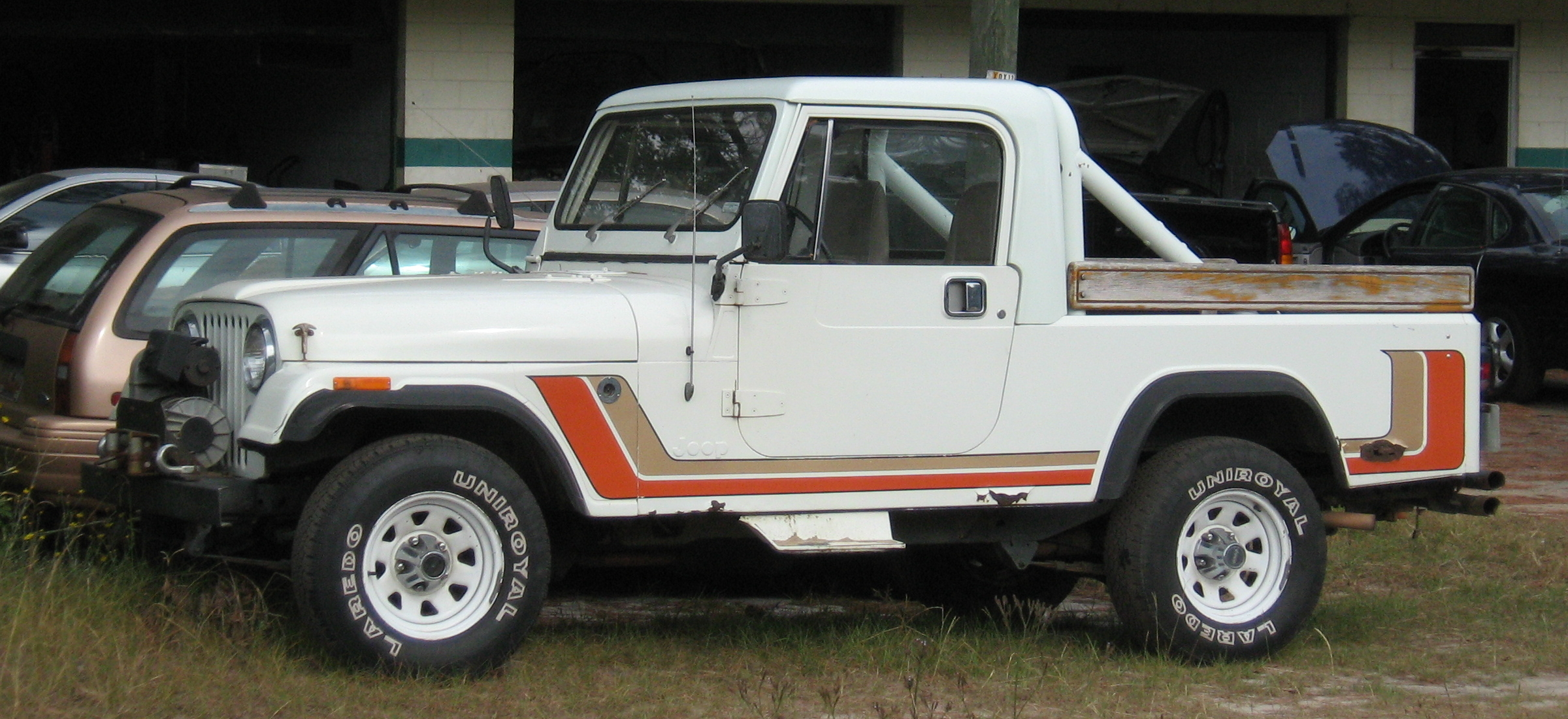
Jeep Scrambler (CJ-8)

The CJ-8, officially referred to as the Jeep Scrambler, was a long-wheelbase version of the CJ-7, introduced in 1981 and manufactured through 1986. It featured a 103.5 in (2,629 mm) wheelbase and a removable half cab, creating a small pick-up style box instead of using a separate pickup bed. Scramblers used the traditional transfer case with manual front locking hubs to engage the four-wheel drive. Most had either a four- or five-speed manual transmission, but a three-speed automatic transmission was an option. The Scrambler would be discontinued in 1986 and effectively replaced by the Cherokee-based Comanche. Former President Ronald Reagan owned a Scrambler and used it on his California ranch.

=== Alaska Postal Service ===
The Alaskan Postal Service ordered a full-length steel hardtop Scrambler with right-hand drive and an automatic transmission. Instead of the rear tailgate, the steel hardtop used a hinged barn-door opening to the back. Only 230 were produced and sold in the U.S. It was also widely sold in Venezuela and Australia as the CJ8 Overlander, with small differences, including full-length rear windows on the Overlander. Steel hardtops used on these postal Scramblers and Overlanders were known as "World Cab" tops.

=== Production ===
| Year | Production |
|---|---|
| 1981 | 8,355 |
| 1982 | 7,759 |
| 1983 | 5,405 |
| 1984 | 4,130 |
| 1985 | 2,015 |
| 1986 | 128 |

There is some debate as to whether 1986 models were leftover units from the previous model year.

== CJ-10 ==
Jeep CJ-10
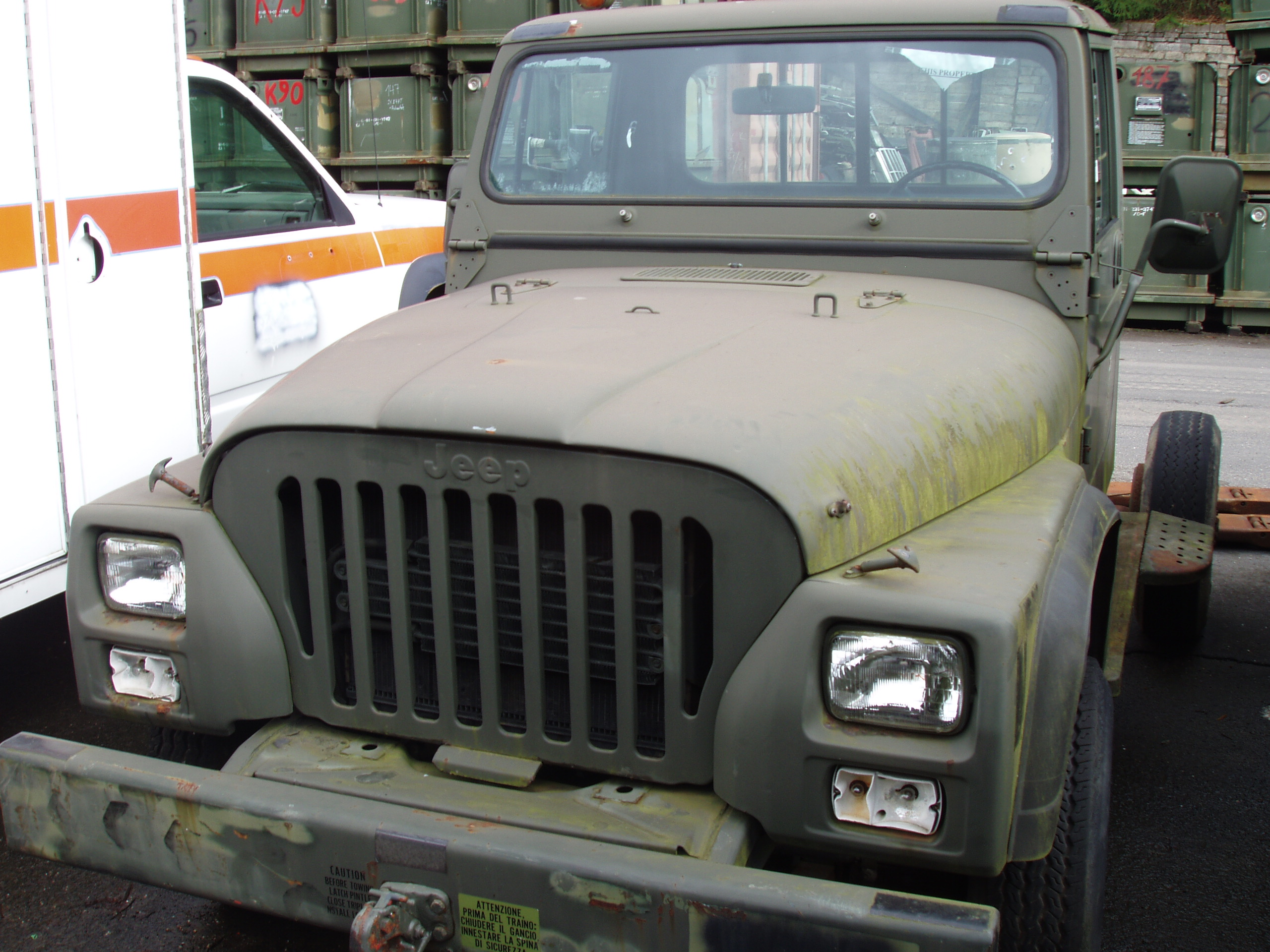

Overview
- Also called: Jeep One-Tonner; Jeep J10
- Production: 1981–1985
- Assembly: United States: South Bend, Indiana; Mexico: Toluca (VAM)

Body and chassis
- Body style: 2-door pickup truck

Powertrain
- Engine: 151 cu in (2.5 L) AMC I4; 198 cu in (3.2 L) Nissan SD33 I6 diesel; 258 cu in (4.2 L) AMC I6
- Transmission: three-speed TorqueFlite A727 automatic; 4-speed Tremec T177 manual

Dimensions
- Wheelbase: 119.8 in (3,040 mm)
- Length: 191 in (4,850 mm) cab & chassis 196 in (4,980 mm) with the utility box and rear bumper
- Width: 68 in (1,730 mm)
- Height: 72 in (1,830 mm)
- Curb weight: 4,300 lb (2,000 kg)

The Jeep CJ-10 was a CJ-bodied pickup truck based on a heavily modified Jeep J10 pickup truck. Produced from 1981 until 1985, it was sold and designed for export markets, Australia in particular. It featured rectangular headlights mounted in the fenders and a ten-slot grille, where all other CJ Jeeps had a seven-slot grille. The CJ-10 could have either a hard or soft top. The truck could be equipped to handle either a 5,900 lb (2,700 kg) or 6,700 lb (3,000 kg) GVW. Three engines were offered; a 198 cu in (3.2 L) six-cylinder Nissan-built diesel engine, a 151 cu in (2.5 L) four-cylinder AMC-built engine, or a 258 cu in (4.2 L) six-cylinder AMC-built engine. The driveline was largely from the larger J series pickups, consisting of either a four-speed Tremec T177 manual transmission or a three-speed TorqueFlite A727 automatic transmission, a New Process 208 transfer case, a Dana 44 front axle, and either a semi-floating Dana 44 or Dana 60 rear axle, depending on GVW rating. Importation of the CJ-10 into Australia ended in 1985, when the Australian dollar's value dropped, making the vehicle significantly more expensive than its competitors.

== CJ-10A ==
Jeep CJ-10A

Overview
- Production: 1984–1986

Body and chassis
- Body style: 2-door flightline aircraft tug

Powertrain
- Engine: 3.3 L (201.4 cu in) Nissan SD33 I6 diesel

The Jeep CJ-10A was a CJ-10-based flightline aircraft tug. Produced in Mexico from 1984 until 1986, it was used by the United States Air Force as an aircraft tug. It was a 4x2 bobtail design. About 2,300 were produced.
