= Borg-Warner T-90 =

T-90

Overview
- Manufacturer: Borg-Warner
- Production: 1945–1971

Body and chassis
- Class: 3-speed manual
- Related: T-86

Dimensions
- Length: 9 in (230 mm)

Chronology
- Predecessor: T-84
- Successor: T-14

The Borg-Warner T-90 is a three-speed manual gearbox manufactured by Borg-Warner. It was used in most Willys and Kaiser-Jeep models from 1945 to 1971, as well as a number of International Harvester models. It is an improved version of the T-84 used in WWII Willys MB and Ford GPW military Jeeps. It was constructed with an iron case in both top-shift and side-shift variants. The gears are spur cut with only 2nd and 3rd gears synchronized.

== T-90A ==
The T-90A was used in Jeep models equipped with a four-cylinder engine.

Applications:

- 1945-49 CJ-2A
- 1949-53 CJ-3A
- 1953-62 CJ-3B
- 1946-50 463 Wagon
- 1947-50 2T/4T
- 1950-62 473/475 4x4
- 1950-62 473/475-4WD
- 1956-65 FC-150
- 1957-65 FC-170
- 1961-65 FJ-3/3A

Ratios
1st	2.798
2nd	1.551
3rd	1.000
Reverse	3.798

== T-90C ==
The T-90C is essentially a T-90A with a 3.339:1 first gear.

Applications:

- 1963-68 CJ-3B
- 1963-71 CJ-5
- 1963-71 CJ-6
- 1963-65 475-4WD Truck
- 1963-65 475 4x4 Wagon

Ratios
1st	3.339
2nd	1.851
3rd	1.000
Reverse	4.531

== T-90J ==
The T-90J variant was used in six-cylinder models.

Applications:

- 1952-55 685 Wagon
- 1954-62 6-226 Truck
- 1954-62 6-226 Wagon
- 1957-65 FC-170
- 1963-65 6-230 Truck
- 1963-65 6-230 Wagon
- 1963- Gladiator
- 1963- Wagoneer
