= Jeep Tornado engine =

American automobile engine

Jeep Tornado
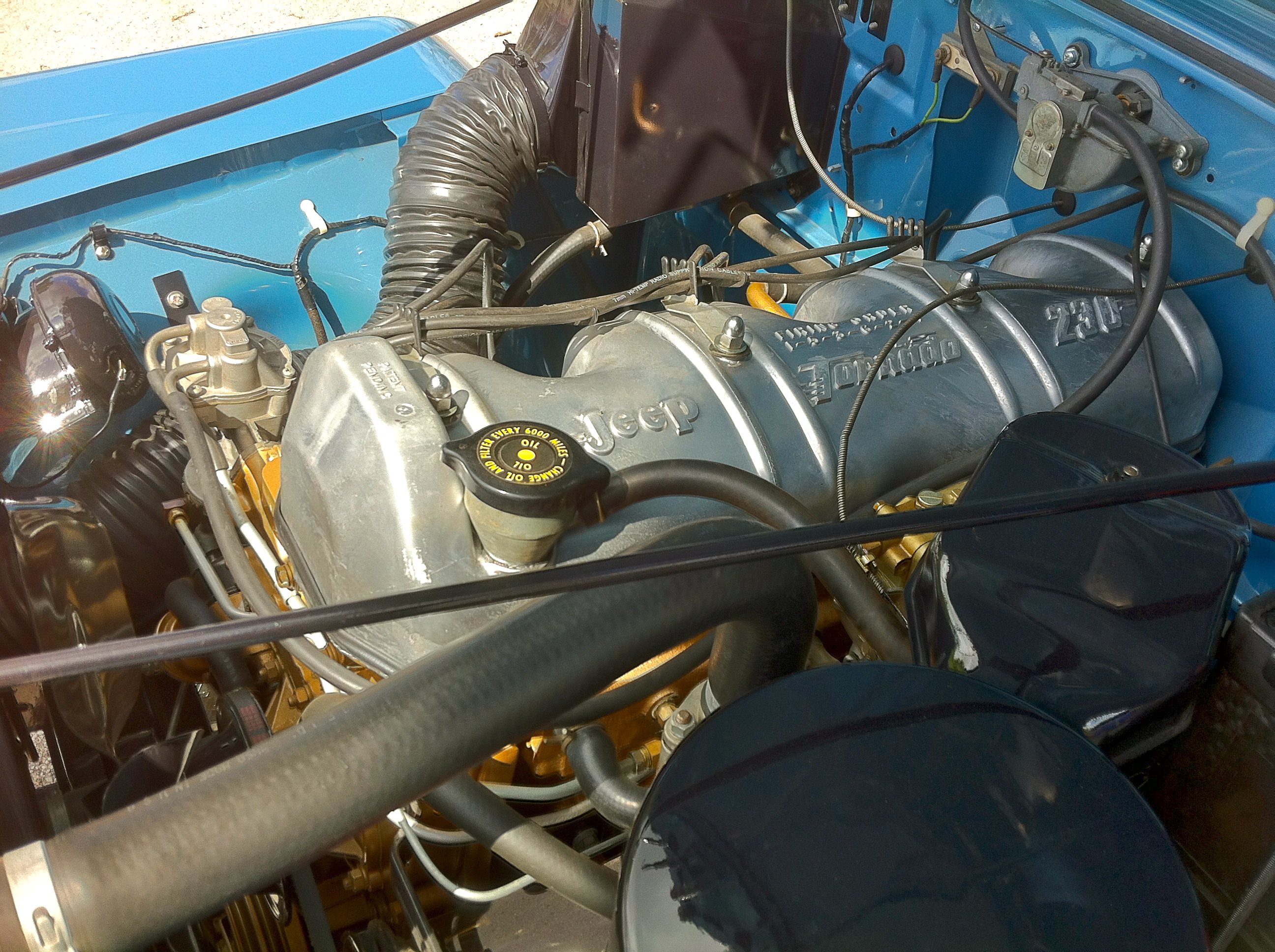

Overview
- Manufacturer: Kaiser-Jeep; Industrias Kaiser Argentina (IKA); Renault Argentina
- Also called: Torino (IKA); Tornado Jet (IKA); Tornado Interceptor (Renault)
- Production: 1962-1973

Layout
- Configuration: straight six
- Displacement: 230.51 cu in (3,777 cc)
- Cylinder bore: 3 11/32 in (84.93 mm)
- Piston stroke: 4 3/8 in (111.13 mm)
- Cylinder block material: Iron
- Cylinder head material: Iron
- Valvetrain: SOHC
- Compression ratio: 8.5:1 or 7.5:1

Output
- Power output: 140 hp (104 kW; 142 PS) at 4000 rpm (high compression) or; 133 hp (99 kW; 135 PS) at 4000 rpm (low compression)
- Specific power: 0.61 hp/in³ or; 0.58 hp/in³
- Torque output: 210 lb⋅ft (285 N⋅m) at 1750 rpm or; 199 lb⋅ft (270 N⋅m) at 2400 rpm

Chronology
- Predecessor: Willys Super Hurricane
- Successor: AMC straight-6 engine

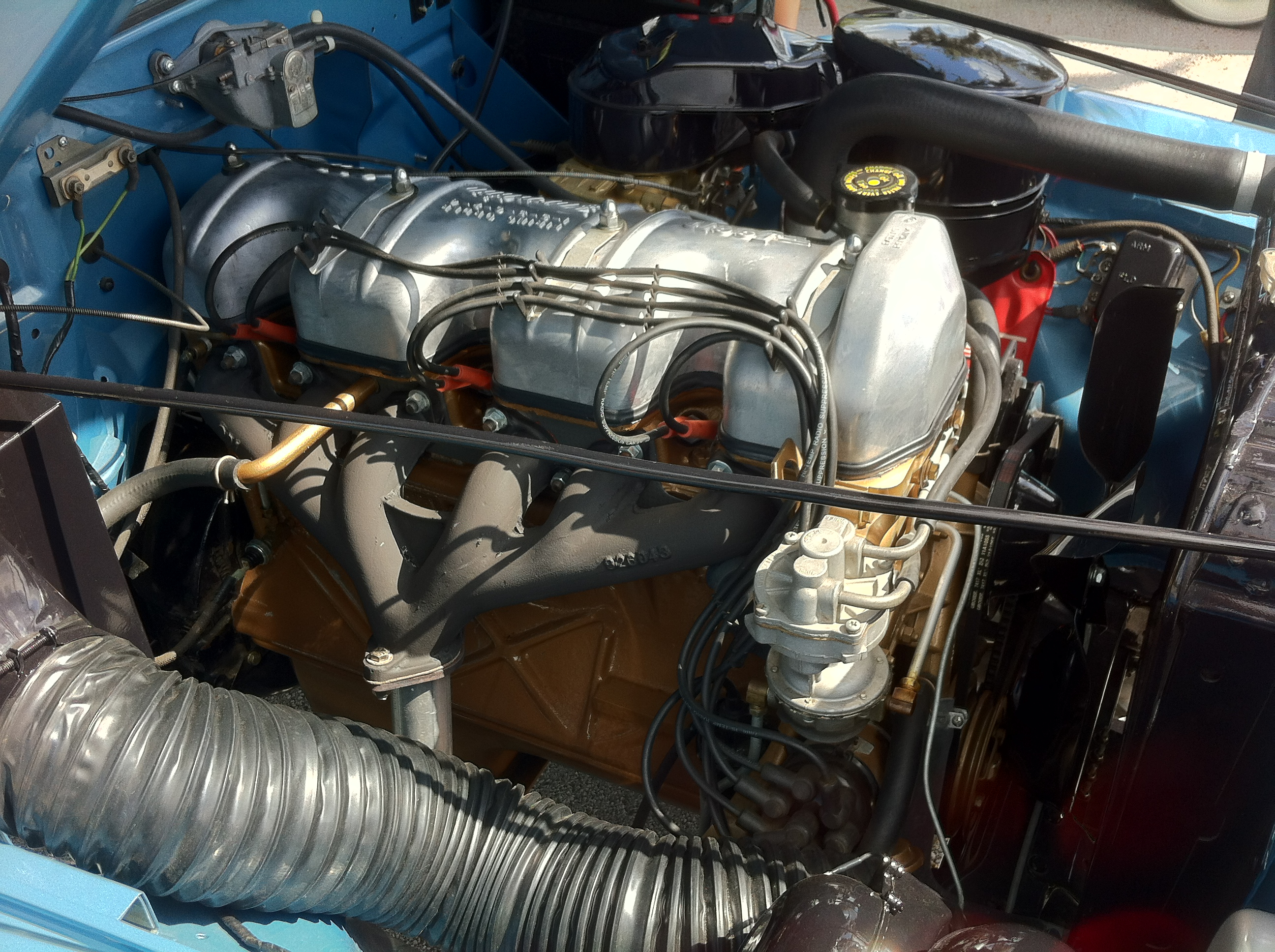
1963 Jeep Tornado engine

The Jeep Tornado engine was the first post-World War II U.S.-designed mass-produced overhead cam (OHC) automobile engine. The 230.5 cu in (3.78 L) hemi-headed straight-six was introduced in mid-year 1962, and replaced the flathead "6-226" Willys Super Hurricane that was in use since 1954.

The Tornado engine was also manufactured in Argentina by Industrias Kaiser Argentina (IKA) from 1965 until 1973.

== History ==
The development of a new engine for Kaiser Jeep for an entirely new vehicle began under Chief Engineer, A.C. "Sammy" Sampietro, in the late 1950s. Sampietro worked under Donald Healey in Europe and focused on improving power output through better engine breathing. The single overhead cam design was combined with hemispheric combustion chambers. Mass production of the new engine began in 1962.

The Jeep Tornado engine was introduced in the Willys Jeep Wagon and truck models. Six-cylinder versions built after 3 May 1962, received the 230 OHC "Tornado" engine, replacing the 226 L-head "Super Hurricane" I6. It was made the standard engine in the entirely new Jeep Wagoneer station wagons (today called SUVs) and Jeep Gladiator pickup trucks that began production in fall 1962 for the 1963 model year.

At the time, the Tornado was the only U.S.-built overhead-cam engine in mass production. The new engine was designed for robust, heavy-duty performance with maximum efficiency. Its excellent fuel economy was proven in tests, with the Tornado-OHC engine having the lowest specific fuel consumption of all production gasoline engines on the market.

== Design ==
Like most Jeep engines, the Tornado was undersquare for better low-speed torque. It had a 3 11/32 in (84.93 mm) bore with a 4 3/8 in (111.13 mm) stroke. The standard version had an 8.5:1 compression ratio. Output rating was 140 hp (104 kW; 142 PS) at 4000 rpm and 210 lb⋅ft (285 N⋅m) of torque at 1750 rpm. The engine's actual torque curve indicated achieving the 210 pounds-feet rating before 1000 rpm and then continuing at that level to approximately 3700 rpm.

A low-compression (7.5:1) version was also available, with 133 hp (99 kW; 135 PS) at 4000 rpm and 199 lb⋅ft (270 N⋅m) of torque at 2400 rpm. These were "high-efficiency" engines with a conservatively rated power output.

Unique features of the design included the camshaft that only had six lobes. One lobe operated both the intake and exhaust valves for each cylinder. This made engineering cam profiles more complex than conventional two-lobes per cylinder (one per valve) designs, but allowed the valves to be better arranged for the cross-flow head. Valves were directly opposite their respective ports, and ports were short with wide radius turns. Another innovation was the crankshaft that was strengthened by ferritic nitrocarburizing by a unique salt bath for two hours at 1,025 °F (552 °C). This was one of the initial applications of this hardening process by an engine manufacturer. The silent-type "Morse chain" timing chain was also special because it was covered with chilled cast iron for long life and compatibility with the cam lobes. Additionally, many of the parts on the engine were made of aluminum, including the front cover, water pump, valve cover, and intake manifold, weight savings that resulted in a 575-pound (261 kg) engine, or about 40 pounds (18 kg) less than the previous "6-226" Super Hurricane.

The new engine's overhead camshaft design was only one of the advanced features offered for the first time in a U.S.-designed and mass-produced engine. To achieve its excellent performance, which included both power and economy, the Tornado was complex by 1960s standards. It was discontinued in civilian vehicles in the U.S. in 1965 following engine failures that tarnished its reputation.

The problems were attributable to a combination of a flawed engine mount on civilian vehicles and the failure of new owners to monitor engine oil levels. Instead of mounting directly to the engine block, the front mounts bolted to an engine cover, which also sealed the timing chain. The arrangement proved too rigid for the timing chain gasket, leading to compromise, oil loss, and engine failure. Repairs were offered under warranty and corrected in later production. Still, the damage to the perception of the Tornado in the consumer marketplace had already been done. On the other hand, military versions of the pickup, the M-715 and the M-725, produced between 1967 and 1969, were designed with regular block-mounted motor mounts.

Road tests of the new Jeep Wagoneer by Car Life magazine described the OHC six as "commendably smooth and quiet." The engine accelerated the four-wheel-drive full-size station wagon (the SUV designation was not yet known) with an automatic transmission from 0 to 60 mph in 15.9 seconds. Their tests recorded 17 mpg_{‑US} (14 L/100 km; 20 mpg_{‑imp}) on the highway and 14.5 mpg_{‑US} (16.2 L/100 km; 17.4 mpg_{‑imp}) in the city."

== Overseas production ==
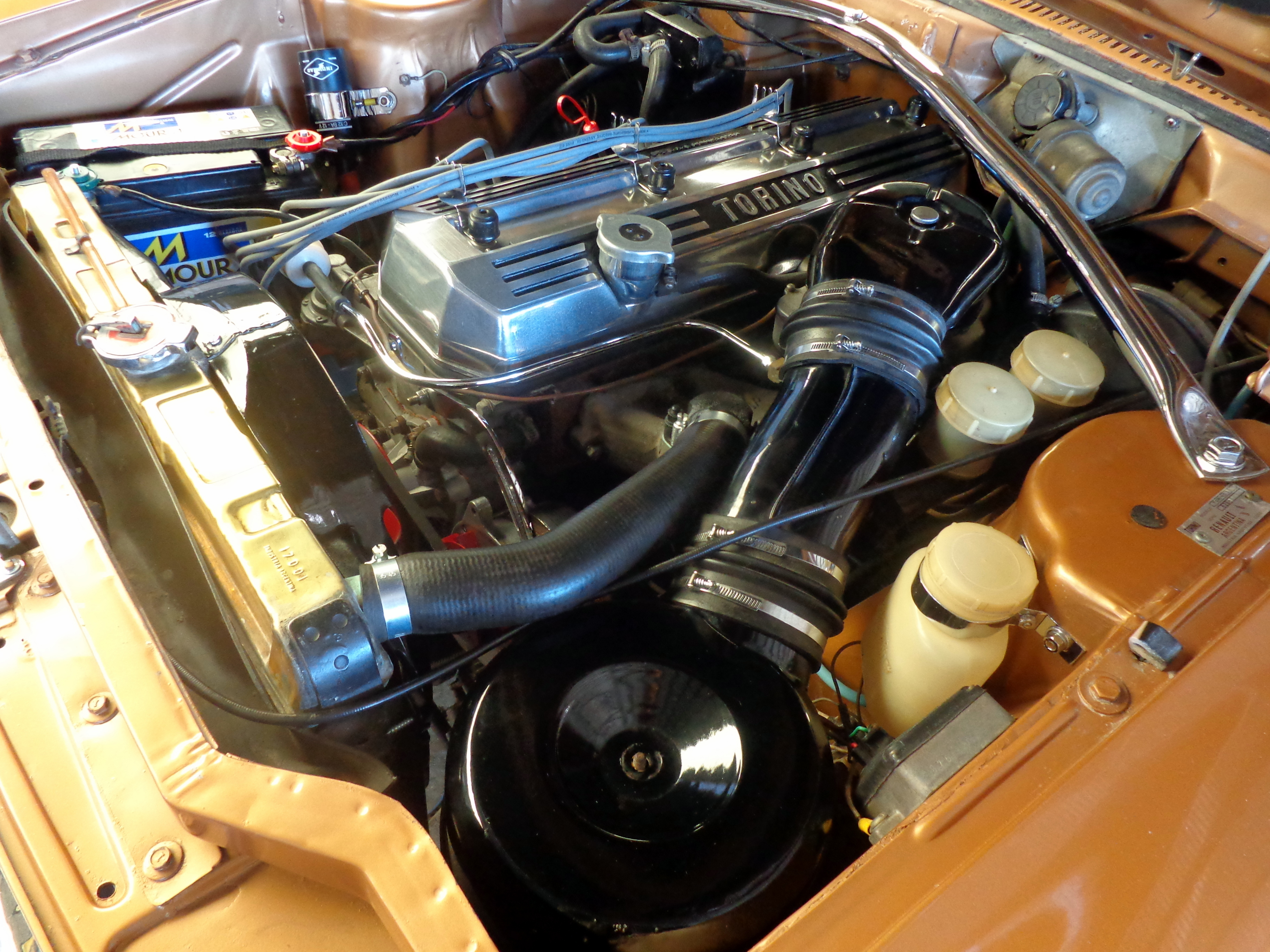
Torino OHC engine in a TS IKA-Renault Torino

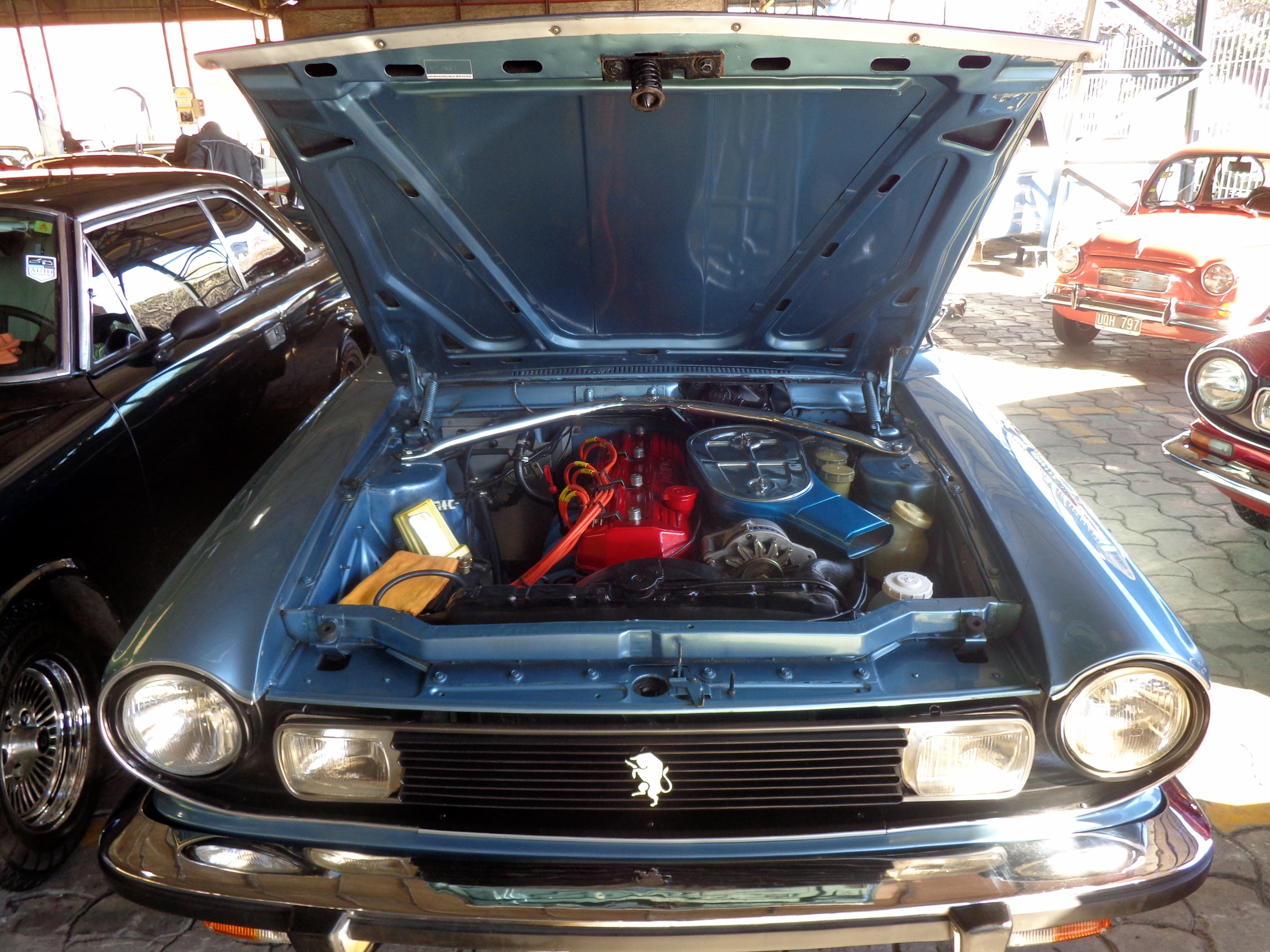
Torino OHC engine in an ZX IKA-Renault Torino

Production of this engine continued in Argentina by Industrias Kaiser Argentina (IKA) after 1965. The OHC engine was used in a variety of Jeep vehicles as well as American Motors Corporation (AMC) passenger cars that were assembled under license. The engine became best known for powering the IKA-Renault Torino, a hybrid version of the AMC Rambler American and Rambler Classic having unique styled front and rear body parts that were built in Argentina from 1966 through 1981.

The IKA Torino and the OHC engine achieved auto racing success, including international recognition in the 1969 Nürburgring 84-hour endurance race. The Argentinian team ran three cars, and after three and a half days of racing, the No. 3 Torino covered 334 laps, the most of all the racers: about 9,450 kilometres (5,872 mi). However, it placed third overall due to penalty points.

The engine name was changed to "Torino" to match the car in 1973. It also received a significant block and crankshaft refinement that year — seven main bearings instead of the original four, as well as a new cylinder head. Industrias Kaiser Argentina was eventually bought out by Renault, and in 1975, the "IKA" name was discontinued, and it became "Renault Argentina". The Torino, Jeeps, AMC vehicles, and the Tornado engine, continued to receive upgrades over the years.

The Argentinian Tornado engines raised output from 155 to 215 hp (116 to 160 kW; 157 to 218 PS) (street versions) and 250 to 350 hp (186 to 261 kW; 253 to 355 PS) (Racing versions). A new cylinder head achieved this, improving the intake and exhaust ducts. Also adopted were a new camshaft, a new exhaust manifold of a 3-1/3-1 type, two 2-inch diameter exhaust pipes, and three Weber DCOE 45-45 side-draft carburetors.

The Torino and the Jeep Tornado engine continued production through 1982. It was marketed as the "Tornado Jet" and later as the "Tornado Interceptor", in AMC design automobiles built by IKA. From 1976 until 1982, they were the only non-Renault–designed cars and engines built by the French company.

== Applications ==
The Jeep Tornado engine was used in the following vehicles:

- Willys Jeep Truck 1962-1965
- Willys Jeep Wagon 1962-1965
- Jeep Gladiator 1963 and 1964
- Jeep Wagoneer 1963 and 1964
- Kaiser Jeep M715 1963-1969 (military only)
- Kaiser Jeep M725 1963-1969 (military only)
- Renault Torino, also known as IKA Torino, 1966–1973
- by Industrias Kaiser Argentina and Renault Argentina, in Jeep utility vehicles, the Rambler Classic and Ambassador passenger cars, from 1965 until 1973
