= Dana 53 =

Automotive axle

The Dana/Spicer model 53 is an automotive rear axle produced by Dana-Spicer used in medium to heavy duty truck applications. The Dana/Spicer model 53 (Dana 53) is a semi-float axle that was produced from 1947–1965, both with a 53 differential and wheel ends, and with a Dana 44 differential and Dana 53 wheel ends.

== Known vehicles ==
- Jeep Forward Control 170 ('56-'65)
- Willys Jeep Truck ('47-'65)
- Jeep Pickup ('62-'88)
- Lincoln Continental (‘61- ‘65)
