= Jeep FJ =

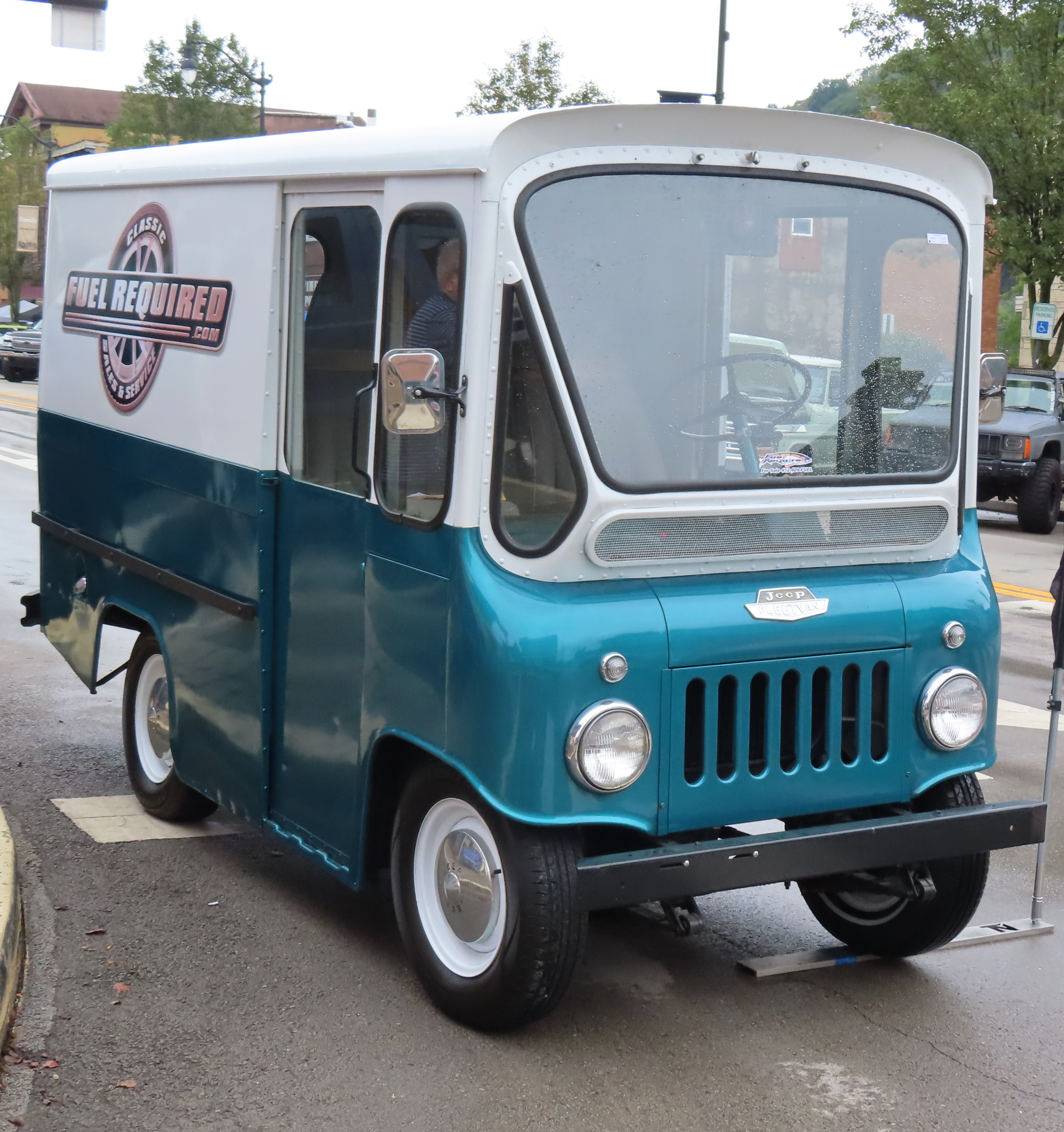

Overview
- Manufacturer: Willys Motors (1961–1963); Kaiser-Jeep (1963–1970); American Motors Corporation (1970–1975)
- Also called: Jeep Fleetvan
- Production: 1961–1975
- Assembly: United States: Toledo, Ohio (Toledo Complex)

Body and chassis
- Class: Compact van
- Layout: FR layout
- Related: Jeep DJ; Jeep CJ

Powertrain
- Engine: 2.2 L F4-134 Hurricane I4
- Transmission: 3-speed Borg-Warner T-90 manual; 3-speed Borg-Warner 35 automatic

Dimensions
- Wheelbase: 81 in (2,057.4 mm) (FJ-3); 101 in (2,565.4 mm) (FJ-6)
- Length: 135 in (3,429.0 mm) (FJ-3); 154 in (3,911.6 mm) (FJ-3A, FJ-6)
- Width: 64.7 in (1,643 mm)
- Height: 90.1 in (2,289 mm)
- Curb weight: 4,000 lb (1,814 kg) (GVW)

The Jeep FJ Fleetvan is a compact delivery van manufactured by Willys Motors and Kaiser-Jeep from 1961 to 1975. It was based on the DJ-3A Dispatcher, but equipped with the F-134 Hurricane engine. Two models were available, the FJ-3 and the longer FJ-3A. It came standard with the familiar Borg-Warner T-90 three-speed manual transmission. A Borg-Warner automatic was offered as an option.

== Postal Service ==
Right-hand-drive FJ-3s were made for the US Postal Service. Most of these had horizontal grille slats in contrast to the seven vertical slats found on standard models.

The FJ-6 model (based on the CJ-6) was introduced in 1965 for postal use, which was ultimately replaced by the FJ-8 & FJ-9 introduced in 1975.

== Gallery Jeep / Mahindra FJ ==
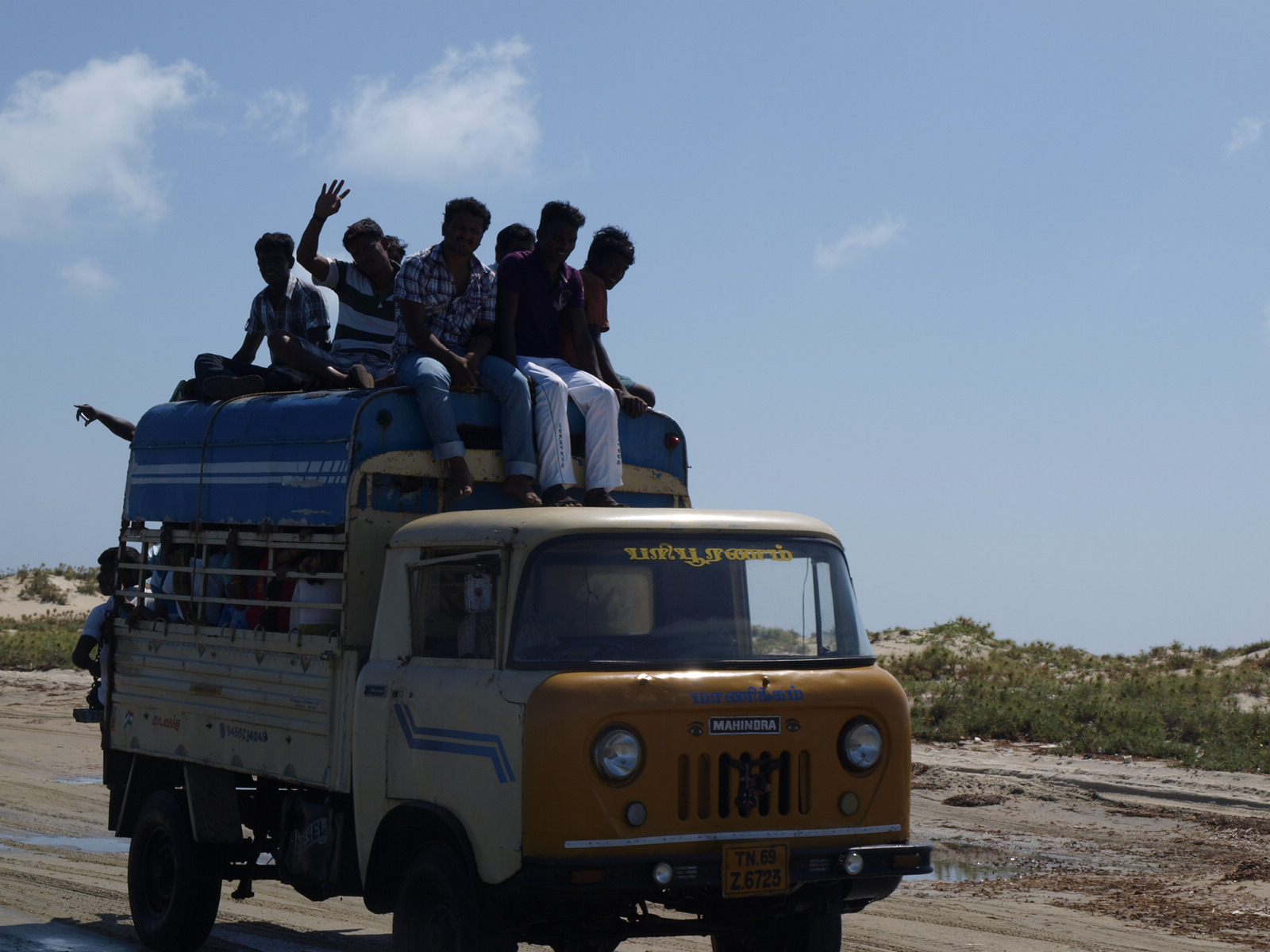
Mahindra FJ

Mahindra FJ-470/460
