= Barney Roos =

American automotive engineer (1888–1960)

Delmar Gerle "Barney" Roos (11 October 1888 – 13 February 1960) was an American automotive engineer who served as Studebaker's head of engineering from 1926 to 1936, specialising in straight-eight engines. He later worked for the British Rootes Group in the design of Humber, Hillman and Sunbeam Talbot cars. Before World War II, he returned to the United States, where he co-designed the Willys MB, the original Jeep.

== Early life, family and education ==
Delmar Roos was born in the Bronx, New York City, New York. He attended Manual Training High School, Brooklyn, New York City, then studied for degrees in electrical and mechanical engineering at Cornell University. He gained distinction as a photographer — a picture he took of a three-horse fire-engine team was syndicated throughout the world — and as an athlete (winning the intercollegiate and national fencing championships). He has been described as tall, well built and handsome, and a brilliant conversationalist on art, drama, economics, politics and science.

== Career ==
=== Early career ===
After graduating from Cornell in 1911, he joined General Electric and worked under Sanford Alexander Moss on steam, gas turbine and centrifugal compressor development. In 1913 he went to Locomobile as assistant research engineer. In 1919, he was assistant to Pierce-Arrow's David Fergusson and succeeded him as chief engineer in 1921 before rejoining Locomobile as chief engineer in 1922. After an intermediate stint with Marmon in 1925, he succeeded Guy P. Henry as Studebaker's chief engineer in 1926.

=== At Studebaker ===
Barney Roos joined Studebaker just as that company's Detroit operation was being transferred to South Bend, Indiana. He oversaw the relocation of the entire engineering department and personnel into a new building. He redesigned the Standard Six and Big Six engines and made other changes to the 1927 model range.

Roos had considerable experience with eight-cylinder engines, having designed the Locomobile Junior Eight and the Marmon Little Eight. Neither was outstanding but the extensive basis of experimentation gave rise to the Studebaker straight-eights, beginning with the President Eight, announced in January 1928.

While at Studebaker, Roos and Stanwood Sparrow collaborated with the Cleveland Graphite Bronze Company to develop a "thin wall" bearing for use in automobile engines. Thin wall bearings, made from steel coated with a low-friction material, had earlier been used in aircraft engines.

Roos developed an independent front suspension system using a transverse leaf spring and upper and lower links. He called this "planar" suspension. The system was introduced on Studebaker cars in 1935.

=== At Willys ===
After working on a one-year temporary assignment for the Rootes Group in England 1938, Roos was ready to come back to the United States.

Roos accepted an offer by Ward M. Canaday, president and major shareholder of Willys-Overland Motors, to become the automaker's Executive Vice President and Chief Engineer. "He made his biggest dent in automotive history when he laid his hands on the World War II Jeep." He was responsible for the design that ultimately became the military Willys MB. He submitted and was awarded design patent 136819, assigned to Willys-Overland which set up the familiar Jeep design having a very slightly tapered front clamshell hood, vertical grill slats and integrated headlights into the front fascia which distinguished it from the original Bantam design. These style traits remain present in modern civilian Jeeps.

Roos also worked to develop the Willys Go Devil engine. It was the most powerful and durable of the three prototype reconnaissance vehicles that were evaluated by the U.S. Army for production in 1940. The Go Devil engine became famous in the Willys MB Jeep produced during World War II powering all the Jeep vehicles built for the U.S. and its Allies, as well as a variety of later civilian Jeep vehicles, including the CJ-2A, the CJ-3A, the Jeep Station Wagon, the Jeep Truck, and the Jeepster.

For the Jeep Station Wagon, Willys' first passenger car after World War II, Roos developed a version of the "planar" suspension he had created at Studebaker. The wagon, with what Willys called "Planadyne" suspension, was the first Willys product with independent suspension.

Roos retired after Kaiser Motors acquired Willys. While running his consultancy, Roos maintained a nominal working relationship with Willys until his official retirement in 1958.

== Personal life ==
Although married, Roos began a relationship with Frances Schreiner in 1934. After Roos's wife divorced him in August 1936, he married Schreiner and moved to England. According to his second wife, Roos decided to leave England after hearing a speech by Adolf Hitler at the 1937 Berlin Motor Show that convinced him that Germany would invade England.

Roos had two daughters by his first wife and one daughter, Delmar, by his second wife.

=== Death ===
On 12 February 1960, Roos was returning by train from a meeting in Reading, Pennsylvania, to his home in Bronxville, New York, when he fell ill. He disembarked at Philadelphia and was admitted to Temple University Hospital. He died there the next day, at the age of 71.
