= IKA Estanciera =

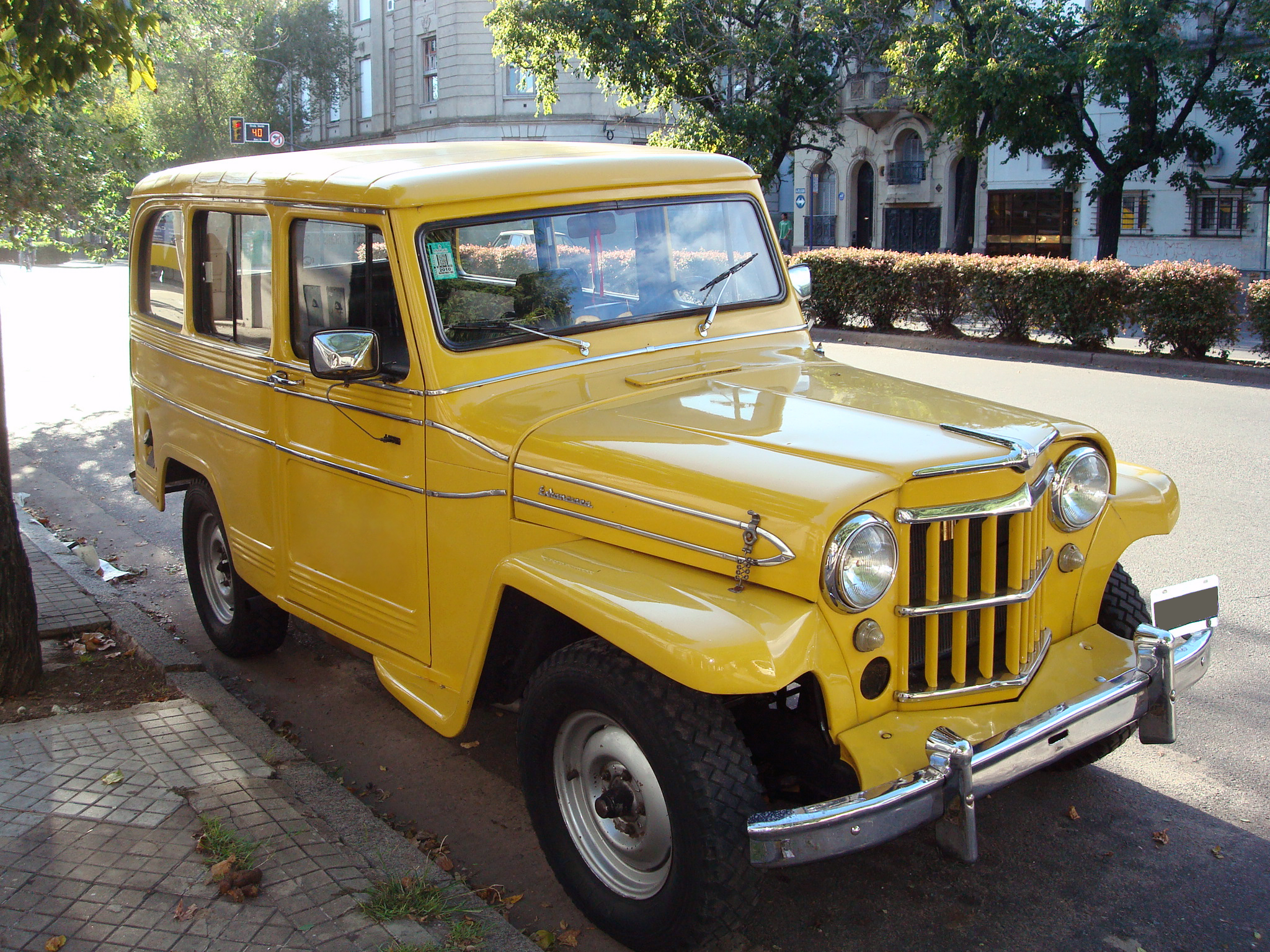

Overview
- Manufacturer: Industrias Kaiser Argentina
- Also called: Willys Jeep Station Wagon
- Production: 1957–1970
- Assembly: Argentina: Santa Isabel

Body and chassis
- Layout: Front engine / rear wheel drive, or four-wheel drive

The IKA Estanciera was the Argentine version of the Willys-Jeep Station Wagon and truck produced by Industrias Kaiser Argentina (IKA) from 1957 to 1970.

Due to its design, like the American ancestor, it is often seen as a precursor to modern day SUVs and 4x4s. With the Jeep CJ as well being a precursor in the country.

== Background ==
After the founding of IKA in 1956, the newly founded subsidiary would produce multiple variations of the Kaiser-Jeep. In 1957, the lineup was expanded to build a localized version of the Willys-Jeep Station Wagon, the Estanciera, (station wagon), the Baqueano (pickup truck) and the Utilitario (panel wagon). Using U.S. production equipment transferred over to Argentina.

Around 1966, a facelift was applied to the model series, with an appearance similar to the same model being produced in Brazil. Production ended in 1970 following the purchase of Kaiser-Jeep from American Motors Company.
