= Willys Jeep Truck =

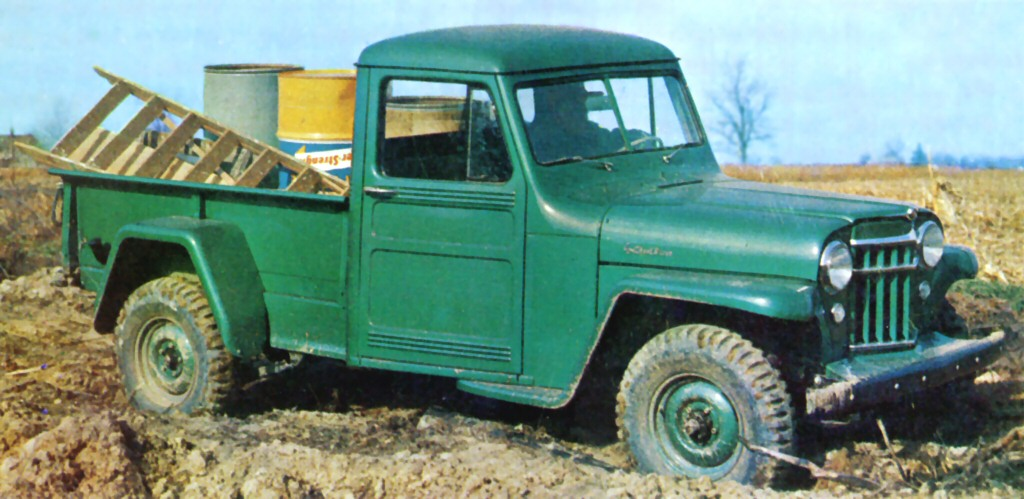

Overview
- Manufacturer: Willys-Overland (1947–1953); Willys Motors (1953–1963); Kaiser Jeep (1963–1965)
- Production: 1947–1965
- Assembly: United States: Toledo, Ohio (Toledo Complex)
- Designer: Brooks Stevens

Body and chassis
- Class: Full-size pickup truck
- Body style: 2-door pickup truck; 2-door cab-chassis; 2-door stake bed
- Layout: Front engine, rear-wheel drive / four-wheel drive
- Related: Willys Jeep Station Wagon; Willys-Overland Jeepster

Powertrain
- Engine: 2.2L L4-134 Go-Devil I4; 2.2L F4-134 Hurricane I4; 3.7L 6-226 Super Hurricane I6; 3.8L 6-230 Tornado I6
- Transmission: 3-speed Borg-Warner T-90 manual

Dimensions
- Wheelbase: 118 in (2,997.2 mm)
- Length: 183.8 in (4,668.5 mm)
- Width: 73.0 in (1,854.2 mm)
- Height: 74.4 in (1,889.8 mm)
- Curb weight: 3,100–3,300 lb (1,406–1,497 kg)

Chronology
- Successor: Jeep Gladiator

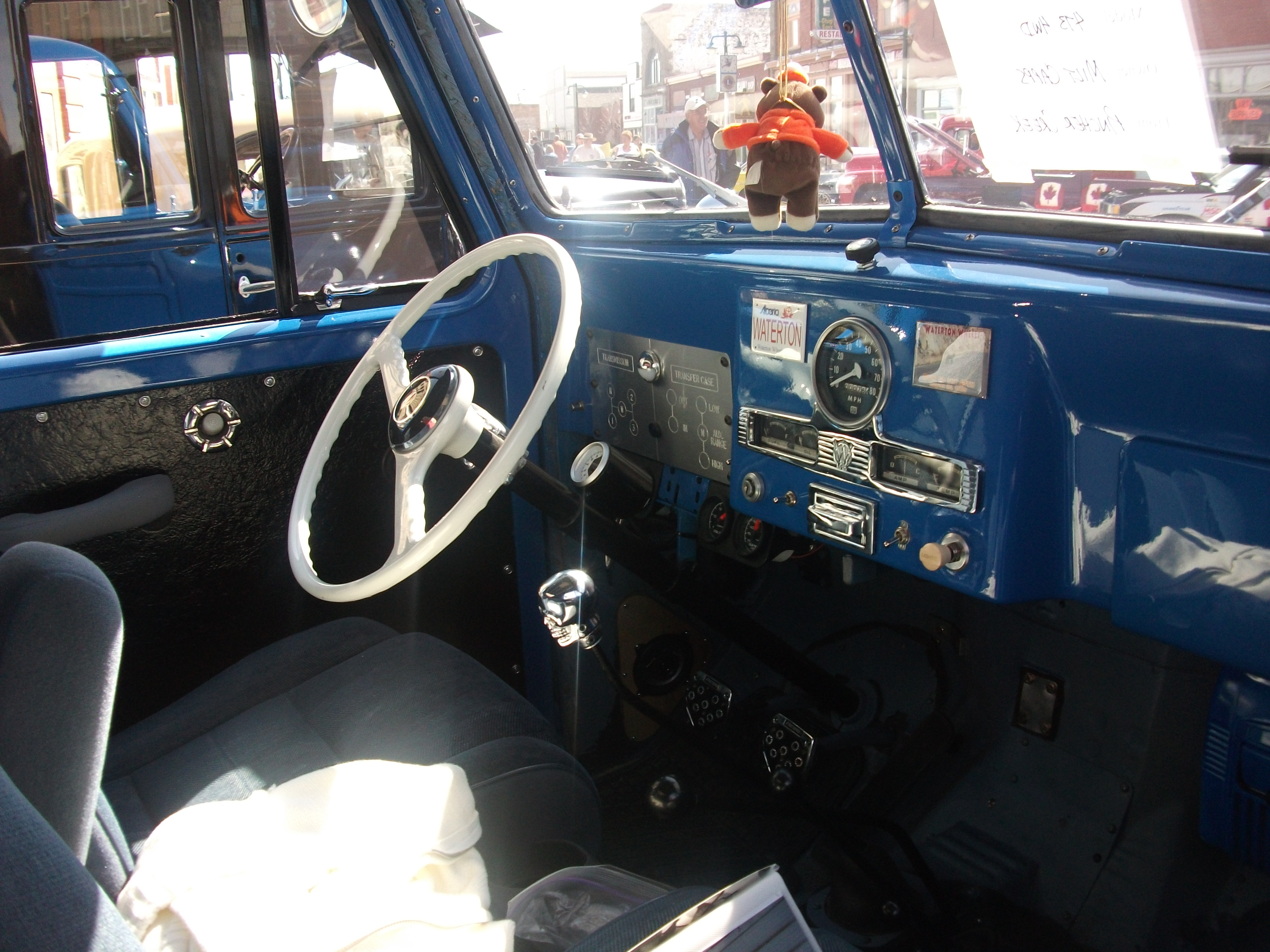
1951 Willys Jeep Truck 473 interior

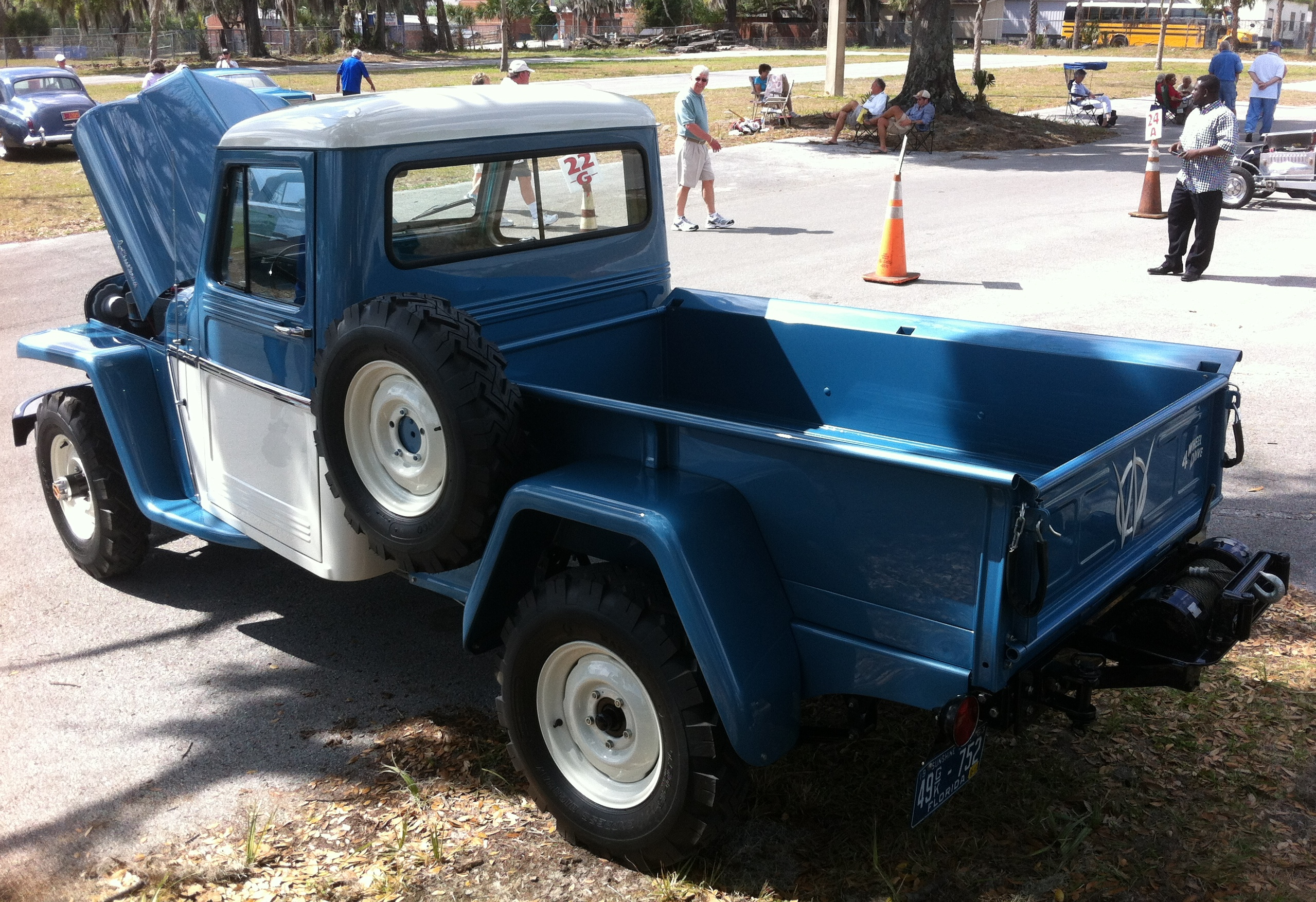
1963 4WD Willys Jeep Truck rear

The Willys Jeep Truck is a truck made by Willys-Overland Motors from 1947 to 1965. The styling and engineering of the Jeep Truck was based on Willys' existing vehicles, the Willys Jeep Station Wagon and the Jeep CJ-2A.

== Production ==
The Jeep Truck was introduced in 1947 as a 1-ton four-wheel drive truck with a wheelbase of 118 inches (2,997 mm). It was available as a pickup truck, a platform stake truck, a chassis cab, or a bare chassis. A ¾-ton two-wheel drive version became available by 1949.

The truck was restyled in 1950 with the addition of a V-shaped grille with five horizontal bars. In 1951 the Hurricane IOE four cylinder engine replaced the earlier flathead engine, increasing power from 63 hp (47 kW) to 72 hp (54 kW).

Optional accessories included an engine governor, a power takeoff, and a pulley drive. A "Dump-O-Matic" hydraulic hoist became available for 1957.

Over 200,000 of these trucks were manufactured.

=== Models ===
Model designations
Designation	Years	Engine	Weight rating (ton)	Final drive ratio (standard)	Final drive ratio (optional)	Notes
2T	1947–1950	Go–Devil	1	5.38:1	4.88:1; 6.17:1	Two-wheel drive
4T	1947–1950	Go–Devil	1	5.38:1	4.88:1; 6.17:1	Four-wheel drive
473	1950–1952	Go–Devil (standard); Hurricane (optional)	1	5.38:1	4.88:1; 6.17:1	Changes from 4T: V-shaped grille with five horizontal bars; Updated gauge cluster; No side steps on the pickup version; Four-wheel drive only from 1951 on
473HT	1950	Go–Devil (standard); Hurricane (optional)	½	5.38:1	4.88:1; 6.17:1	Two-wheel drive half-ton version of the 473
475	1953–1965	Hurricane	1	5.38:1	4.88:1; 6.17:1	Restyled 473; three horizontal bars on grille instead of five
6-226	1954-1962	Super Hurricane	1	4.88:1	5.38:1	Continental straight-six engine
6–230	1962–1965	Tornado	1	4.88:1	5.38:1	Replacement for 6-226; newer straight-six engine

== Drivetrain ==
Engines
Name	Designation	Configuration	Capacity	Years
Go–Devil	L4–134	side-valve inline-4	134 cu in (2.2 L)	1947-1950
Hurricane	F4–134	inlet-over-exhaust inline-4	134 cu in (2.2 L)	1950-1965
Super Hurricane	6–226	side-valve inline-6	226 cu in (3.7 L)	1954-1962
Tornado	6–230	overhead camshaft inline-6	230 cu in (3.8 L)	1962-1965

The Jeep Truck was available with only one transmission, the Borg-Warner T-90 three-speed manual, with synchromeshed second and third gears. A Spicer/Dana 18 transfer case was used on four-wheel drive models. The heavy duty Timken 51540 rear axle was used in the early years of production, later being replaced by the Dana 53 axle. The front axle was a Dana 25
