= Kaiser Carabela =

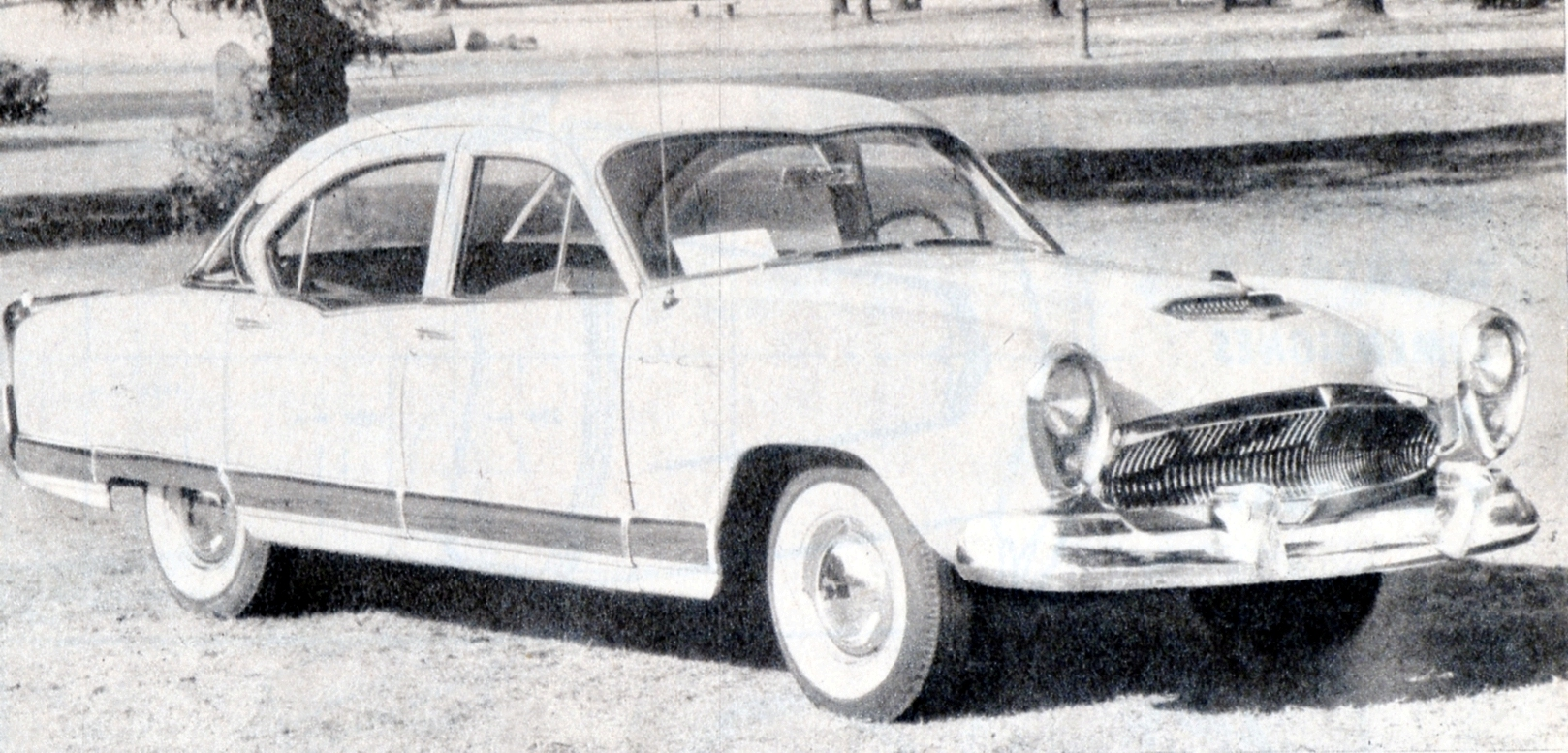

Overview
- Type: Full-size car
- Manufacturer: Industrias Kaiser Argentina (IKA)
- Also called: Kaiser Manhattan (1951-55)
- Production: 1958-1962
- Model years: 1958-1962
- Assembly: Santa Isabel, Cordoba

Body and chassis
- Body style: 4 door sedan 2 door "flower car"

The Kaiser Carabela was the Argentine version of the Kaiser Manhattan localized for Argentine production by IKA between 1958 and 1962 at IKA's Santa Isabel factory.

The Carabela was largely a carryover from the 1954 and 1955 Kaiser Manhattan, with nearly complete models shipped to Argentina from the Toledo, Ohio plant for reproduction. The transmission and superchargers were deleted for Argentine export, along with improved suspension and modifications for the unpaved roads of Argentina. And instead of an Automatic transmission found in the 1955 Kaiser Manhattan, a domestic 3 speed transmission was used instead.

Approximately 10,225 Carabelas were produced, which 57 were used as taxis.

== Other variants ==
With relationships between IKA and the Argentine government, a number of limousines were built for Argentine officials, including Argentine president Arturo Frondizi.

A funeral car and flower car variants were customly made locally in Argentina, an example of the funeral car showed up on Bring-A-Trailer in 2023. It is unknown how many Kaiser Carabela funeral cars and flower cars were made and how many still exist.
