= Industrias Kaiser Argentina =

Argentine motor car company

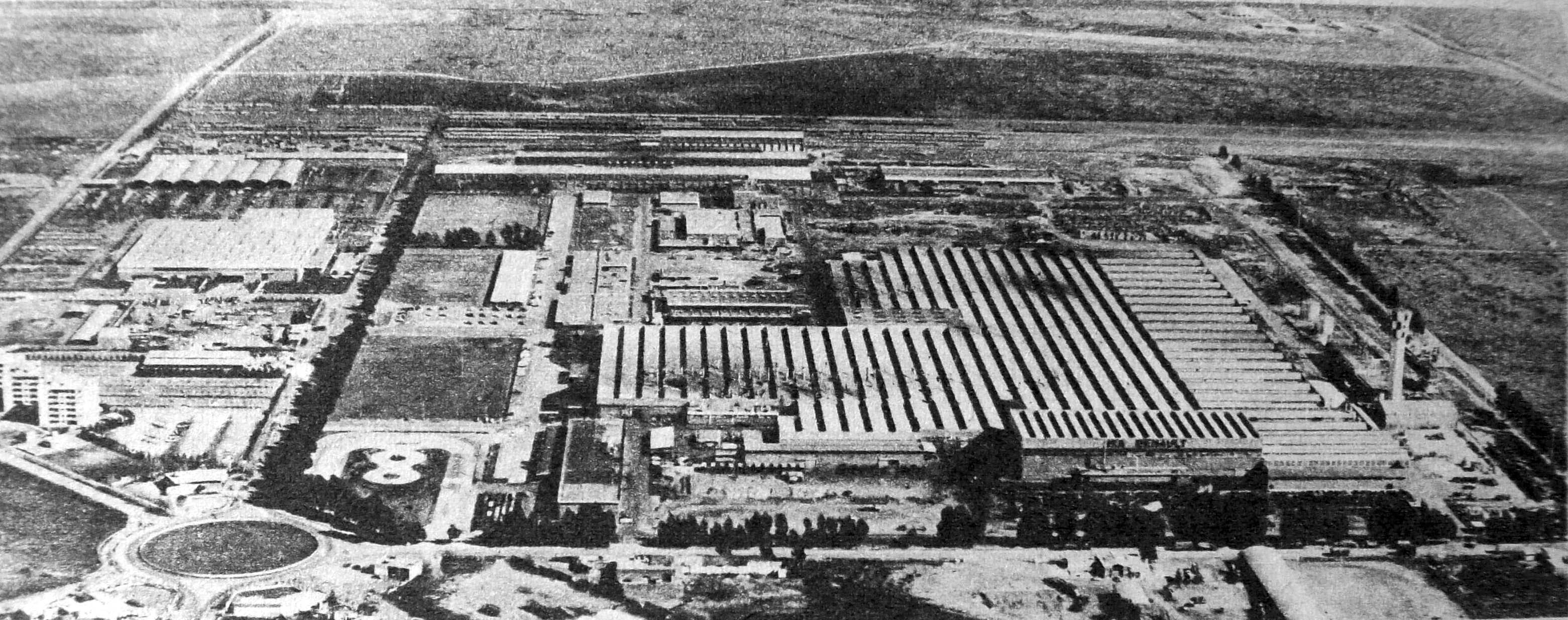
- Aerial view of the IKA plant in Córdoba
- Company type: Subsidiary
- Industry: Automotive
- Founded: 1956
- Defunct: 1975; 51 years ago
- Fate: Acquired by Renault in 1967, took over completely in 1975
- Successor: Renault Argentina
- Headquarters: Córdoba Province, Argentina
- Products: Automobiles
- Brands: Kaiser; Jeep; Renault
- Number of employees: 8,500 (1965)
- Parent: Kaiser Motors (1956–1967); Renault (1967–1975)

Industrias Kaiser Argentina S.A. (mostly known by its acronym IKA) was an Argentine automobile manufacturer established in 1956 as a joint venture with Kaiser Motors of the United States. Headquartered in Santa Isabel, Córdoba, the automaker produced a variety of Kaiser Jeep vehicles and American Motors Corporation (AMC) models, including Argentina's most iconic car, the Torino, before partnering with France's Renault, which bought it out in 1970.

Under its new name "IKA-Renault", the company continued operating until Renault took over completely becoming Renault Argentina in 1975. The French subsidiary remained in the former IKA factory at Santa Isabel.

== History ==
=== 1950s ===
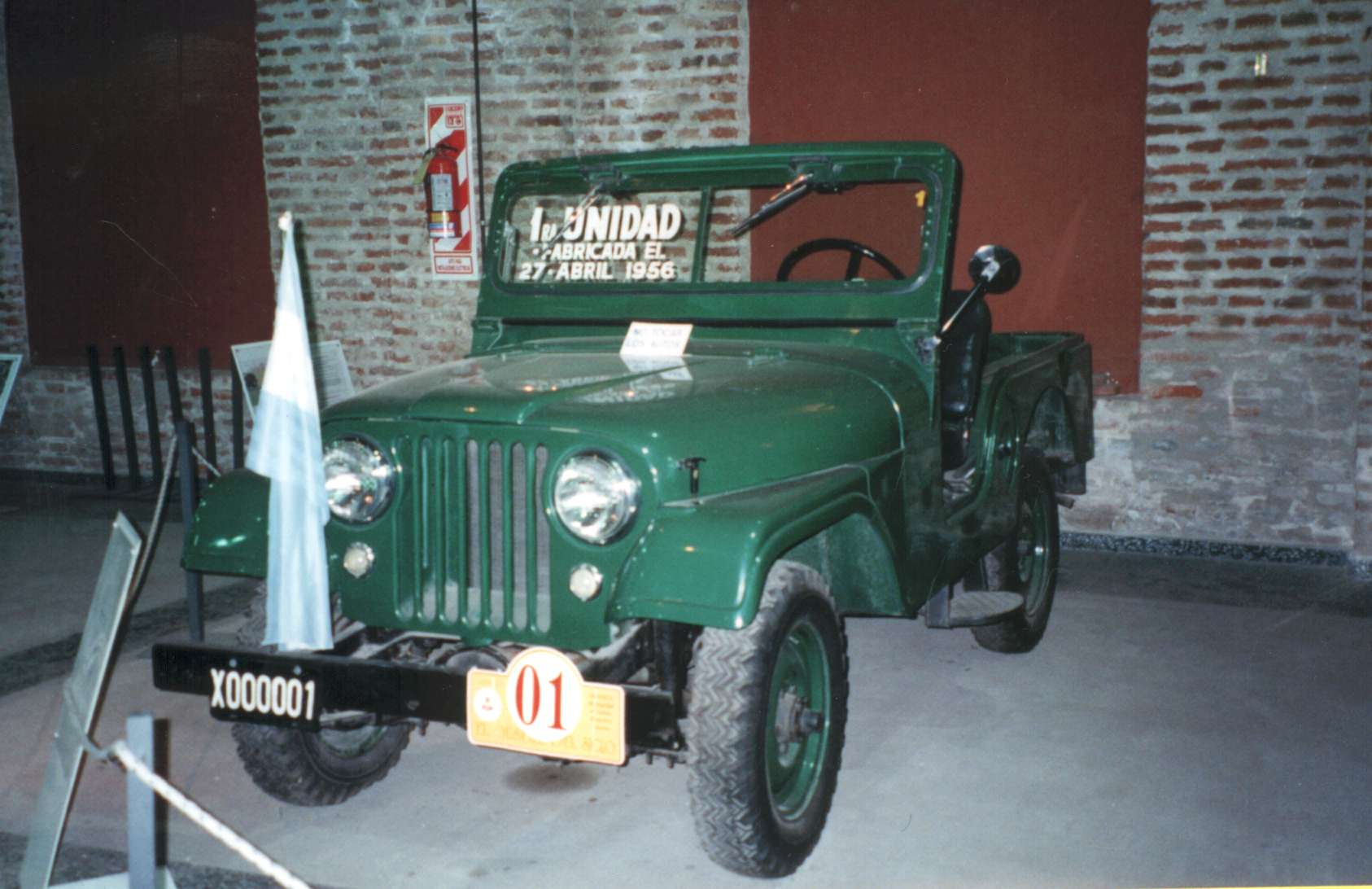
Willys Motors' Jeep CJ was the first model to be produced by IKA Argentina in 1956

The government of Argentina sent a delegation to the United States in 1951 to meet with auto manufacturers interested in building cars in Argentina. Unfortunately, the market was seen as too small to justify the investment, and no one but Kaiser was interested. On 19 January 1955, the government signed an agreement to permit Kaiser to manufacture automobiles and trucks in Argentina. The U.S. automaker was facing problems in its domestic market. It took the Willys Aero out of production in 1955 leaving two redundant sets of vehicle production lines. The Kaiser auto manufacturing equipment was shipped to Argentina while the Willys equipment formed the automaker's capital contribution to establish a new company in Brazil.

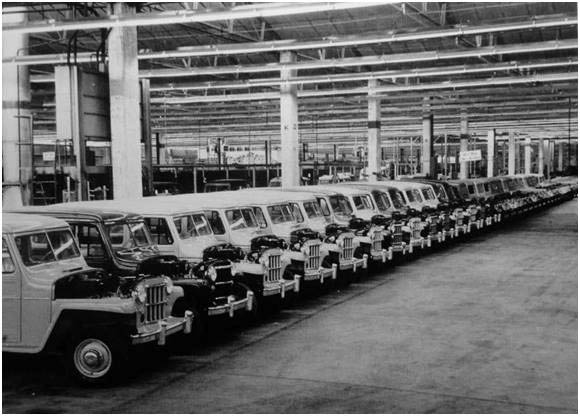
IKA production of Jeep "Estanciera" ~ 1959

Kaiser created Kaiser Automotores, a wholly owned subsidiary as a holding company that owned part of the newly created Industrias Kaiser Argentina, the manufacturing and marketing arm. Other partners in IKA included Industrias Aeronáuticas y Mecánicas del Estado (IAME), the government-owned airplane and vehicle manufacturer, as well as private investors. The public offering of shares of stock was oversubscribed.

The first imports from the U.S. consisted of 1,021 complete cars, manufacturing equipment, and spare parts. Groundbreaking for the new factory in the city of Santa Isabel in Córdoba Province was held in March 1955 with the first Jeep vehicle driven out on 27 April 1956.

The initial production was of various Jeeps. Models included the CJ versions, as well as the Willys Jeep Truck (renamed "Baqueano") pick-up, and the Willys Jeep Station Wagon or "Estanciera" as well as a panel delivery version known as the "Utilitario". These utility vehicles were shortly followed by a local version of the Kaiser Manhattan 4-door sedan, called the "Carabela", using the U.S. production equipment which had been transferred to IKA. The combined Carabela-Jeep production of 22,612 units was 81% of all vehicles manufactured in Argentina in 1958 with the only competition being a state-run utility vehicle manufacturer.

To expand the marketing of its vehicles in 1958, IKA sponsored a musical variety show El Show de IKA that highlighted an American vocalist, Andy Russell. It was the most expensive TV program produced in Argentina, a Jeep was driven on the stage during every show, and the first to use cameras mounted high above the stage.

In 1959, the American-Argentine company signed a license agreement with French firm Renault to produce its cars in Argentina. The small Renault Dauphine was the first model to be launched.

=== 1960s ===
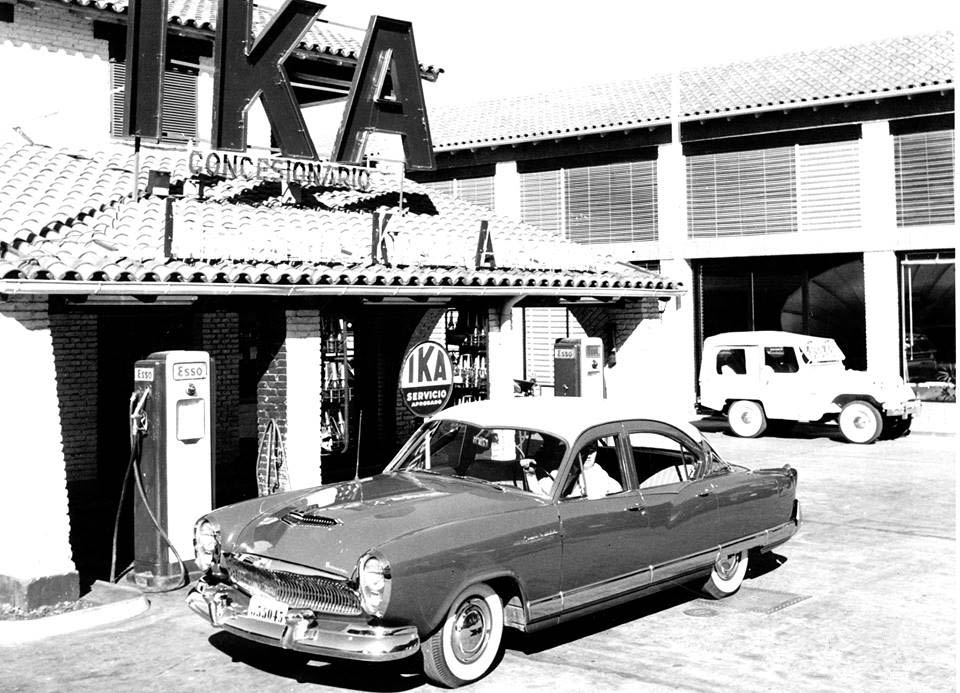
Kaiser Carabela (local name of the "Kaiser Manhattan") exhibited at a dealership in 1960

In 1960, the small Renault Dauphine was the first model to be launched after the license agreement with the French company one year before. The Carabela model was discontinued in 1962, and by that time IKA also assembled other automobiles. Alfa Romeo sold IKA the body molds for its discontinued Alfa Romeo 1900 sedan to become the Bergantin.

Production started on 10 March 1960. The Bergantin was described as the first locally conceived, designed, and engineered car. Local content made in Córdoba included a Willys 2480 cc four-cylinder engine and the Jeep rear suspension and drum brakes that were also used in the Estanciera. The car rode on a 103.3 in (2,624 mm) wheelbase with an overall length of 173 in (4,394 mm). Starting on 31 May 1961, the IKA Bergantin received the 115 hp (86 kW) Continental six-cylinder that was already used for the Estanciera and Carabela models, but only 353 units were made with this engine. Production of the IKA Bergantin ended on 21 February 1962, with nearly 5,000 units sold in three versions: Standard, Deluxe, and Taxi cab. At the time, IKA's Cordoba plant produced about 40,000 vehicles annually, including Renaults and Jeeps as well as Kaisers and Ramblers.

In 1962, another joint model venture agreement took place between IKA and American Motors Corporation (AMC). Various Rambler models licensed from American Motors Corporation (AMC) replaced all of the old Kaiser and Alfa Romeo based cars. To meet local content regulations the Ramblers were adapted to use an Argentine-built Kaiser engine. The same engineer (Ralph H. Isebrandt) had designed both drivetrains. The final form of the AMC variants was the potent Rambler American/Classic-based "Torino" that saw a success on international racing circuits.

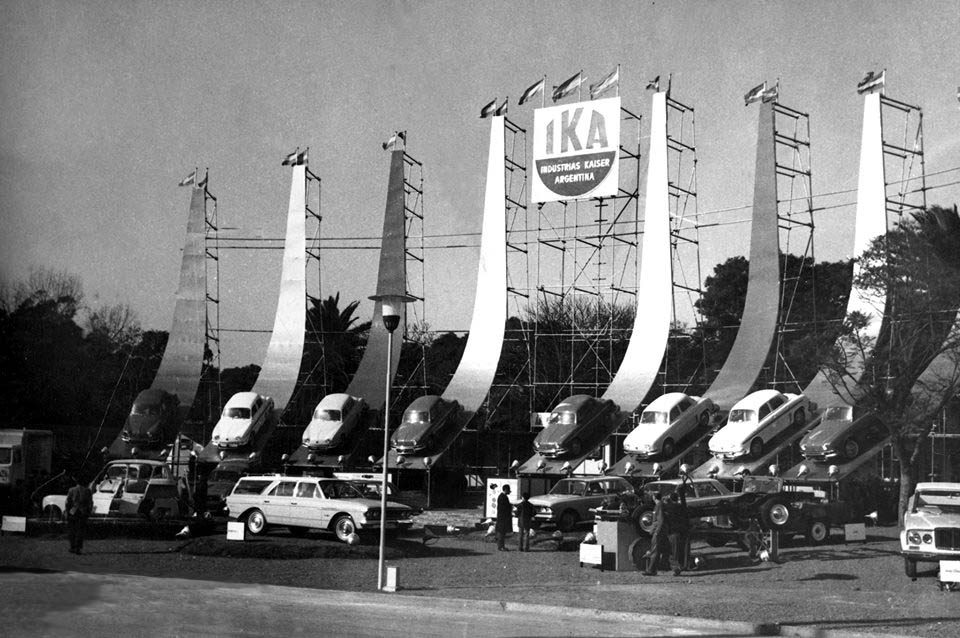
Several models by IKA exhibited in 1964

Assembly of IKA Ramblers began in 1962, with the Argentinean cars being the 1961 U.S. versions, but equipped with 226 cu in (3.70 L) Continental I6 engines producing 119 hp (89 kW; 121 PS) at 4000 rpm, along with a steering column-mounted manual three-speed transmission. Production peaked in 1965, with a total of 55,269 vehicles assembled by IKA of which about one-third were Kaiser-Frazer based cars and Jeeps, while the other two-thirds were AMC Ramblers as well as Renaults produced under license. Representing about 28% of Argentina's total production, IKA was the nation's largest independent automobile manufacturer with 8,500 employees.

IKA produced the U.S. first- and third-generation Classic and the fifth-generation Ambassador in four-door sedan and station wagon versions from 1962 to 1972. The Ambassador was more luxurious, comfortable, better-equipped, and longer than the Classic (5077 versus 4902 mm). Automotive magazine Parabrisas wrote that the 1965 Ambassador was "the highest expression of comfort tested so far" by the editors. This top model in Argentina continued to be available by special order through 1975.

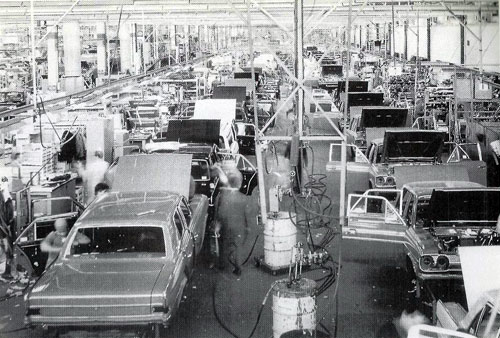
Rambler Classics on Santa Isabel assembly line in 1969

By 1966 the Santa Isabel plant was producing a broad line of models that included the following:

- Four Renaults: Dauphine, Gordini, R4L, and R4F
- Six utility models: Jeep, Pick-up, Jeep Estanciera (also taxi version), Jeep truck, Jeep Gladiator (500, 1000 kilos) - in two- and four-wheel drive - and Charge
- Four AMC Rambler models: Classic Custom, Classic de Luxe, Classic Cross-Country (station wagon), and Ambassador 990
- IKA Torino model (coupe and sedan)

In 1967, Régie Nationale des Usines Renault of France assumed control of the company by purchasing a large percentage of the shares of stock and changed its name to "IKA Renault S.A."

=== 1970s ===
In 1970 Kaiser Industries decided to exit the auto business and it sold the rest of its IKA holdings to its partner, Renault of France, thus ending the history of Argentina's indigenous automaker. The new enterprise was focused on mass-market models, such as the Renault 12.

In 1975, the original factory in Santa Isabel changed from IKA to Renault Argentina S.A.

== Models produced ==
All were built in the Santa Isabel factory of Córdoba: List of vehicles (automobiles and trucks) produced by Industrias Kaiser Argentina (1956–67), then IKA-Renault (1967–75):

Marque	Local name	Orig. name / model	Origin	Type	Produced	Image
IKA	Jeep	Willys Motors; Jeep CJ	USA	Off-road	1956–1978	
IKA	Estanciera	Willys / Kaiser Jeep; Station Wagon	USA	Station wagon	1957–1970	
Kaiser	Carabela	Kaiser Manhattan	USA	Automobile	1958–1961	
IKA	Bergantin	Alfa Romeo 1900	ITA	Automobile	1960–1962	
Renault	Dauphine	Dauphine	FRA	Automobile	1960–1970	
Rambler	Classic	AMC Rambler Classic	USA	Automobile	1962–1967	
Jeep	Gladiator	Jeep Gladiator	USA	Pickup truck	1963–1967	
Renault	R4	R4	FRA	Automobile	1963–1975 (Note: Production continued by Renault Argentina, which succeed IKA in 1975.)	
Rambler	Ambassador	AMC Ambassador	USA	Automobile	1965–1972	
IKA	Torino	1965 AMC; Rambler American	USA; ARG (Note: Although based on the American Rambler, the Torino was re-designed by Pininfarina and fully developed in Argentina.)	Automobile	1966–1975	
Renault	R6	R6	FRA	Automobile	1969–1975	
Renault	R12	R12	FRA	Automobile	1970–1975	

== Bibliography ==
- Cipolla, Franco H. (2003). IKA: la aventura (IKA: the adventure) (in Spanish). Córdoba: Ediciones del Boulevard. ISBN 987-556-006-5.
- Cipolla, Franco H. (2004). La Epopeya De Kaiser-Renault, 1954-1975 (The Epic of Kaiser-Renault, 1954-1975) (in Spanish). Córdoba: Ediciones del Boulevard. ISBN 987-556-040-5.
