= Jeep Forward Control =

Series of pickup trucks made by Jeep

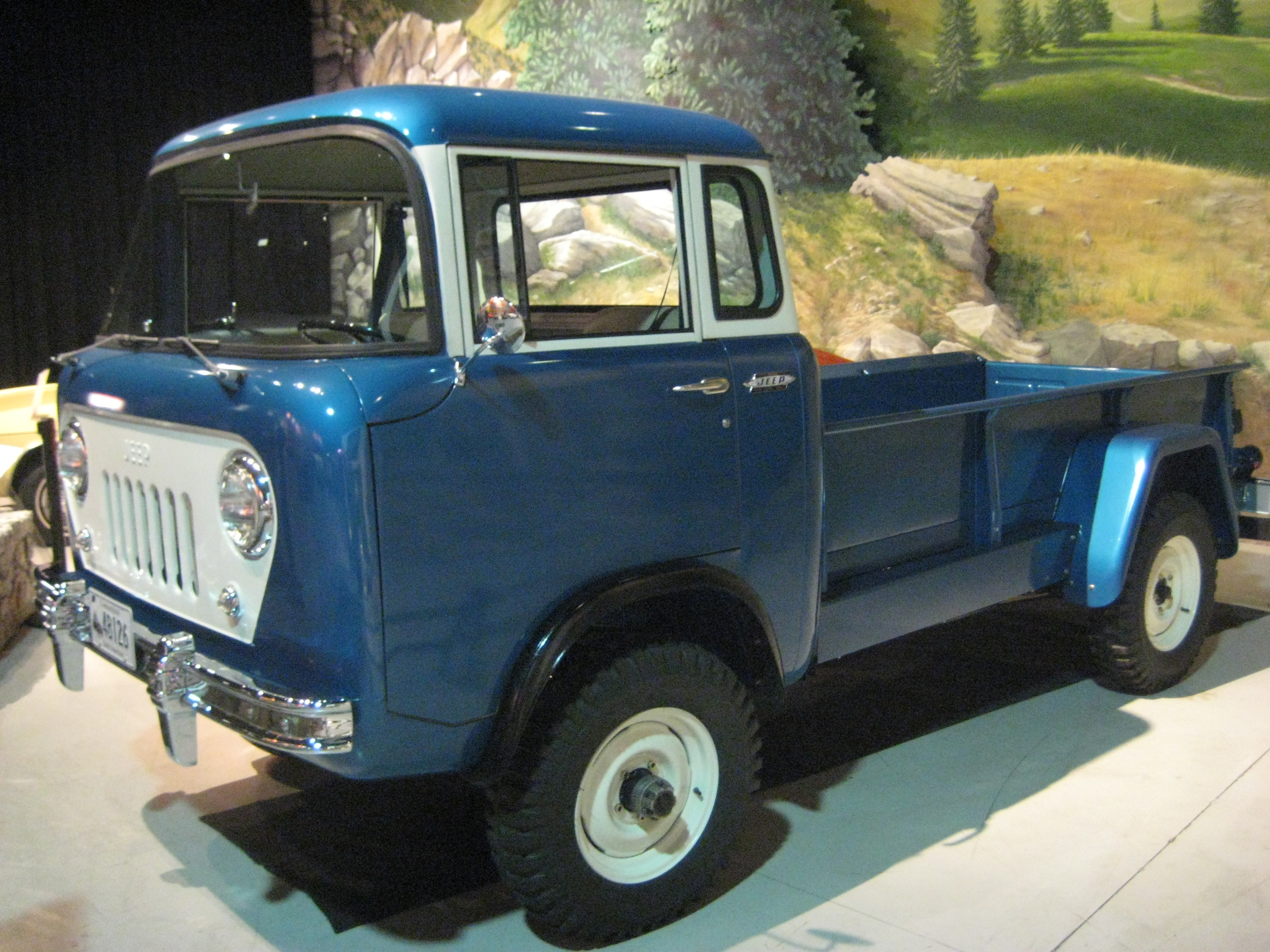

Overview
- Manufacturer: Willys Motors (1956–1963); Kaiser Jeep (1963–1965)
- Production: 1956–1965; 1965–1999 (India); 1970–1985 (Spain)
- Assembly: United States: Toledo, Ohio (Toledo Complex); India: Mumbai (Mahindra & Mahindra Limited); Spain: Zaragoza (VIASA)
- Designer: Brooks Stevens

Body and chassis
- Class: Truck
- Layout: Front engine, four-wheel drive

Powertrain
- Engine: 134 cu in (2.2 L) Hurricane F4-134 I4 (FC-150, FC-160); 226 cu in (3.7 L) Super Hurricane I6 (FC-170, FC-170 DRW, FC-180); 272 cu in (4.5 L) Y-block V8 (FC-180, FC-190)
- Transmission: 3-speed Borg-Warner T-90 manual; 4-speed Borg-Warner T-98 manual (from 1958); 3-speed Cruise-O-Matic automatic (FC-180, FC-190)

Dimensions
- Wheelbase: 81 in (2,057 mm) FC-150; 93 in (2,362 mm) FC-160; 103 in (2,616 mm) FC-170, FC-170 DRW; 123.5 in (3,137 mm) FC-180; 150 in (3,810 mm) FC-190
- Length: 147.5 in (3,746 mm) (FC-150); 181.5 in (4,610 mm) (FC-170, FC-170 DRW)

Chronology
- Successor: Jeep Gladiator (SJ)

The Jeep Forward Control is a truck that was produced by Willys Motors, later named Kaiser Jeep, from 1956 to 1965. It was also assembled in other international markets. The layout featured a cab over (forward control) design.

The Forward Control models were primarily marketed as corporate, municipal, military, and civilian work vehicles. Regular pickup box beds were standard, and customers were offered many "Jeep-approved" specialized bodies from outside suppliers. These ranged from simple flatbeds to complete tow trucks, dump trucks, and fire trucks. The vehicles were also manufactured under license in India and Spain.

== Design ==
Willys produced utility vehicles that remained almost unchanged since 1947. As the marketplace grew more competitive in the 1950s, management developed a new range of modern cab and body trucks. The independent designer that Willys contracted since the 1940s, Brooks Stevens, used styling cues from full-size cab-over-engine trucks for this new futuristic-looking space-efficient vehicle with the center grille panel made to imitate the classic seven-slot Jeep design. The unconventional forward control layout and "helicopter look" of the cab were too unusual for mainstream buyers during that era. Still, they were successful in specialty markets that included airport service vehicles, tow trucks, and railroad crew trucks that could ride the rails. Numerous versions of the Forward Control Jeeps were manufactured for general and specialized applications with 1957 being the top production with almost 10,000 vehicles built that year.

Engineering was based on the existing CJ-5. Power came from the Hurricane F-head and L-head 4-cylinder engines. The updates in 1958 on both the FC-150 and 170 versions had attained a goal established by Willys engineers to design a versatile commercial vehicle in which the ratio of the vehicle's curb weight to its payload was 1 to 1. According to the Society of Automotive Engineers (SAE), this was regarded as the lowest ratio offered by domestic manufacturers at that time within the standard light-duty commercial vehicle segment. The FC layout offered advantages, including a short turning radius and a large cargo bed size, given the compact overall length.

Proposals included a "Forward Control Commuter" design that may have been among the earliest minivan-type vehicles. Three operational concept cars were built by Reutter in Stuttgart, West Germany. Brooks Stevens also transformed this truck platform into a passenger vehicle.

== FC-150 ==
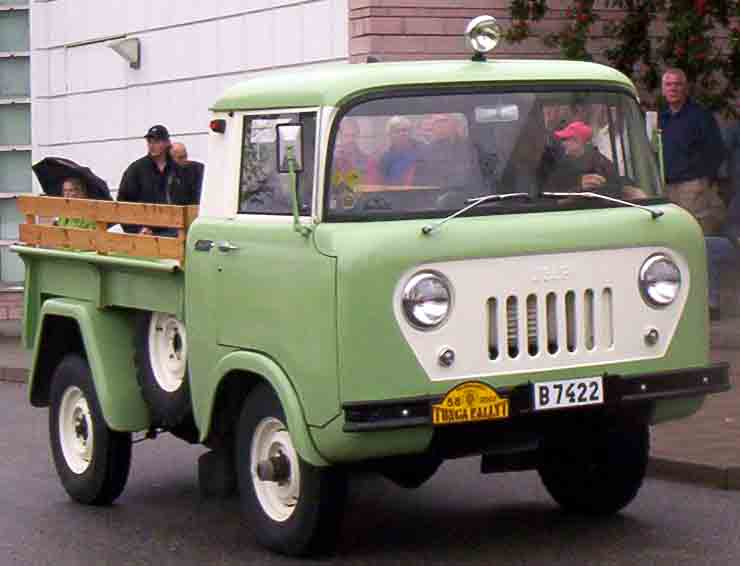
FC-150 in Sweden

Introduced in 1956, FC-150 models were based on the CJ-5 with its 81 in (210 cm) wheelbase, but featuring a 78 in (200 cm) long cargo box. This was a record-breaking six-foot length (with the tailgate up) load bed on a vehicle whose total 147.5 in (370 cm) length was two inches shorter than the diminutive two-seat Nash Metropolitan. The rugged design and go-anywhere capability included a claim that the FC could climb grades of up to 60% and reviews by Mechanix Illustrated highlighted the vehicle's toughness and surefootedness.

In 1958, the FC-150 received a new, wider chassis. Its track was widened from 48 in (120 cm) to 57 in (140 cm). A 1958 FC-150 concept featured an 83.5 in (210 cm) wheelbase, a widened track (which made production), and the new T-98 4-speed manual transmission. This model had a gross weight of 5,000 lb (2,300 kg).

== FC-170 ==
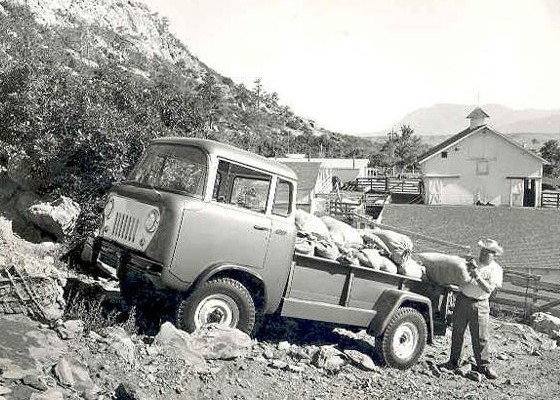
1957 Jeep model FC-170 with pickup cargo bed

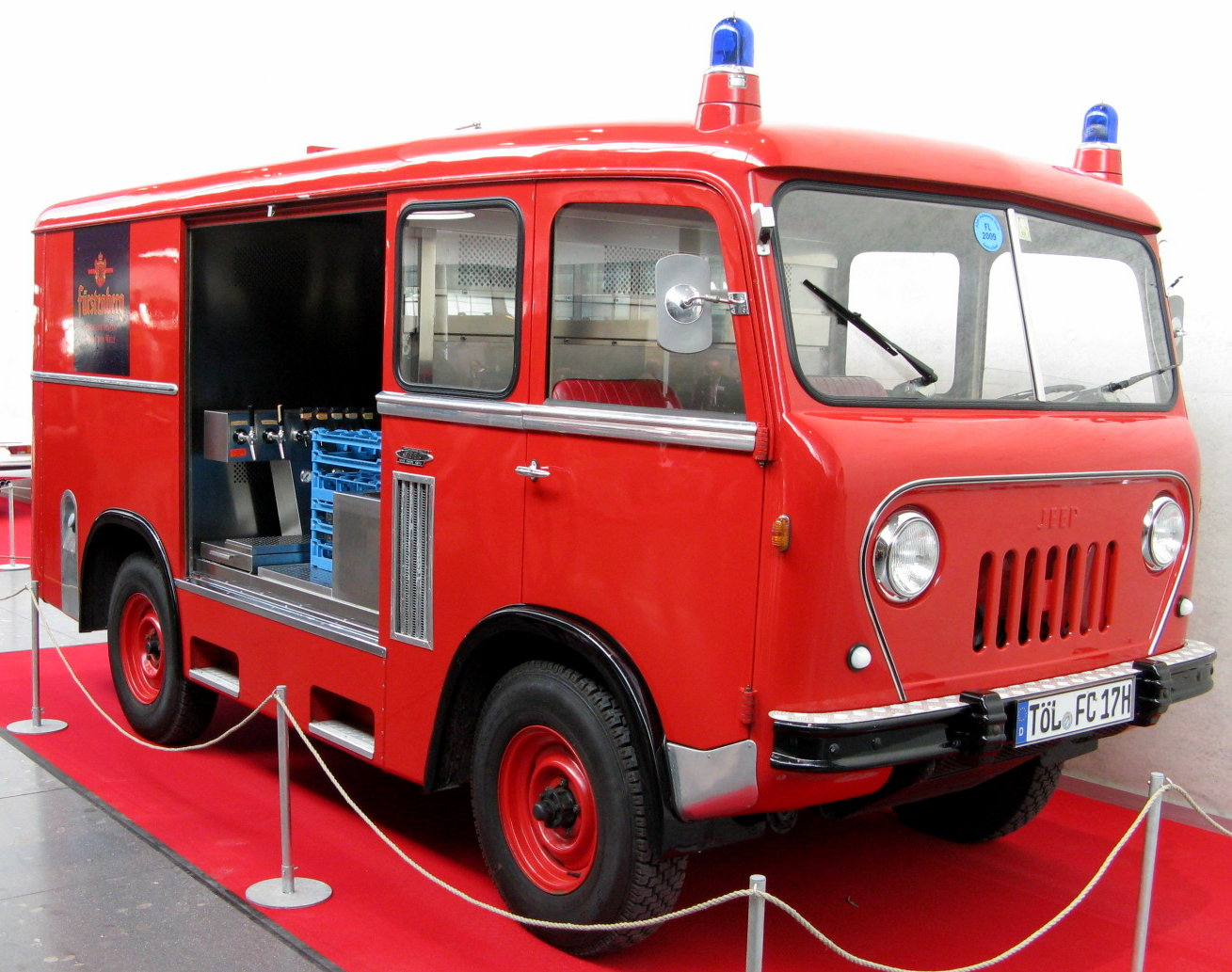
German fire engine van body Forward Control

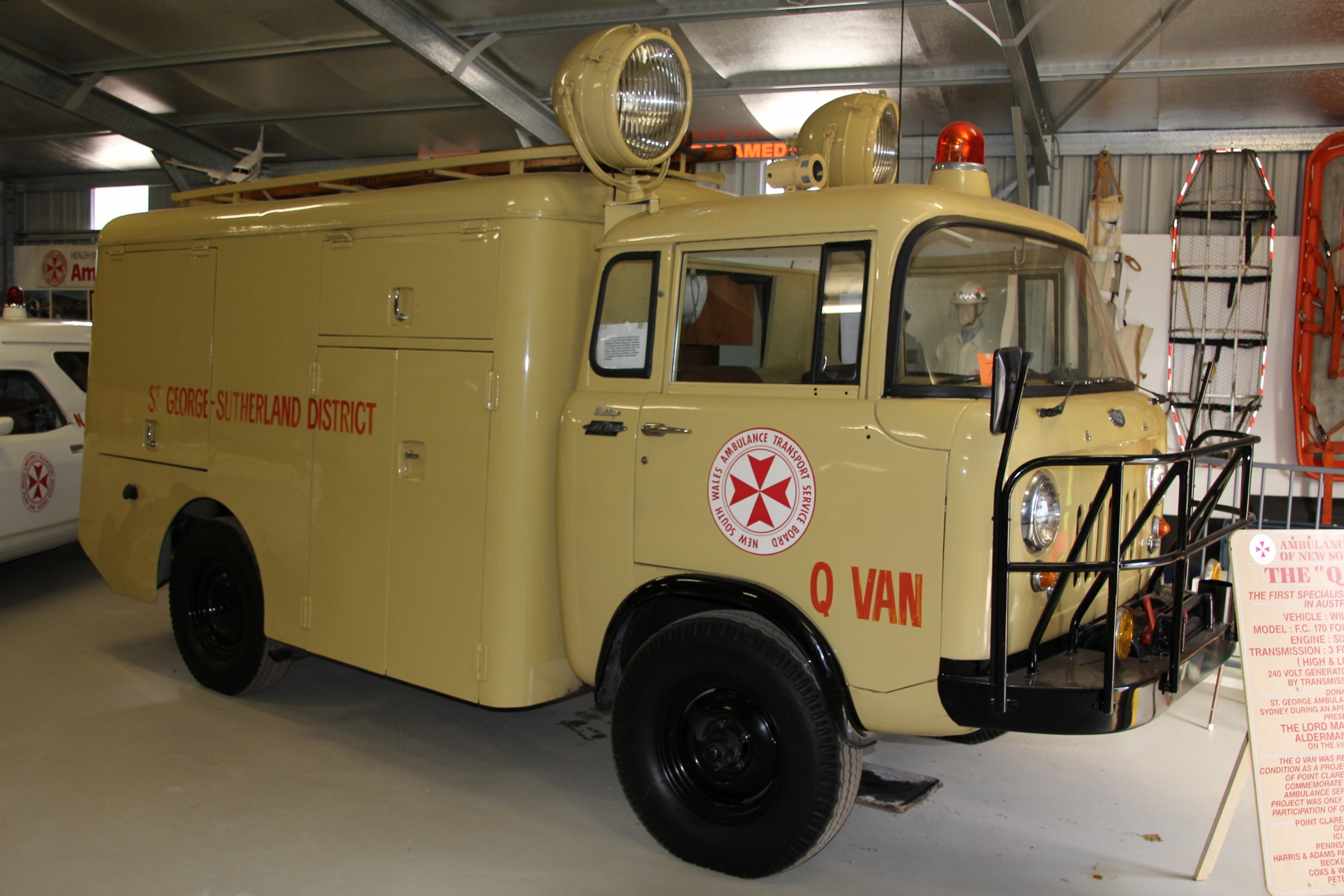
1961 FC-170 Australian rescue truck

Introduced in 1957, FC-170 models had a 103 in (260 cm) wheelbase with a 108 in (270 cm) bed. The forward-control layout achieved this. The cab did not tilt for engine access. The standard six-cylinder engine was mated to a three-speed transmission. A 1958 concept version of the FC-170 featured a 108 in (270 cm) wheelbase. This was required to accommodate a new 272 cu in (4.5 L) V8 engine (based on the Ford Y-block) with a new transfer case. A new 3-speed automatic transmission (based on the Ford Cruise-O-Matic) was only available with the inline-6 due to possible driveshaft angle issues. A T-98 4-speed manual with both engines was available. This model had a gross weight of 7,000 lb (3,200 kg).

== FC-170 DRW ==
A 1 short ton (0.91 t) dual-wheeled rear axle (dually) model with a 120 in (300 cm) load bed. These models have gross weights of 8,000 lb (3,600 kg) or 9,000 lb (4,100 kg).

== FC-180 ==
The FC-180 was shown in concept form on paper in a 1957 Willys company brochure titled "1958 Projects - Product Engineering". It was essentially a lengthened FC-170 DRW (wheelbase increased from 103 to 123.5 in). Features included a 150 in flatbed, the 226 cu in (3.7 L) "Super Hurricane" inline-6 or the 272 cu in (4.5 L) V8 as available engines, and the T-98 4-speed manual or 3-speed automatic as available transmissions. This model had a gross weight of 10,000 lb (4,500 kg).

== FC-190 ==
The FC-190 was also shown in concept form in 1957. It featured a 150 in (380 cm) wheelbase, a 202 in (510 cm) flat bed and tandem dually axles. The T-98 manual transmission was standard, with the automatic as an option. No six-cylinder option was offered; standard was the 272 cu in (4.5 L) V8. The FC-190 would use components from the FC-170 and FC-180 to keep costs down. This model had a gross weight of 16,000 lb (7,300 kg).

== Production ==
The FC Jeeps were exhibited to Jeep dealers in a closed-circuit telecast on November 29, 1956, and were on display for the public at the December 1956 National Automobile Show in New York City. The FC-150 went on sale at dealer showrooms on December 12, 1956. The initial response to the four-wheel drive FC Jeeps was favorable. Their best sales year came in 1957, when 9,738 trucks were sold. After the introduction of the FC-170 in 1957, FC-150 sales dropped to 1,546 units in 1959, before rebounding to 4,925 in 1960.

Brooks Stevens made a rendering around 1960 for a possible facelift for the FC-series.

The FC models did not become the big sellers that Willys had hoped. Total production in nine years was just over 30,000 units. The FC line was discontinued in 1964.

== Military variants ==
Four dedicated military variants of the FC-170 were manufactured for the U.S. Navy and Marine Corps under a 1964 contract. Production is estimated to have been between 400 and 700 units, mostly the M677 four-door pickups. A 1963 analysis done by Jeep concluded that the militarized FC-170s compared favorably to the aging Dodge M37, at least for behind the front-line service. The XM-676 prototype had a 50% larger cargo cube, could carry 12 troops in the back instead of eight in the M-37, had a 700-pound greater load rating, and yielded more than twice the mileage, but Jeep was likely more focused on landing the contract for the M715 trucks that replaced the M-37.

The official operators' and service manuals were written and published by Kaiser-Jeep, not the army. The general government description of the vehicles was Jeep' Truck, Diesel engine, 7000-pound GVW, 4x4, with the variants named:

- M676 Truck, Cargo Pickup — a modified version of the commercial FC-170 pickup
- M677 Truck, Cargo Pickup w/4 Dr. Cab — a four-door crew-cab pickup with a canopy over the bed
- M678 Truck, Carry All — a van-body FC-170 with windows, and three cabin doors
- M679 Truck, Ambulance — a van-body FC-170 with two cabin doors and no further side windows, fitted as an ambulance

There were notable mechanical differences with the civilian market vehicles. First of all, the Marine Corps variants of the FC-170s were powered by a different engine – a Cerlist 85 hp (63 kW; 86 PS) three-cylinder 170 cu in (2.8 L) two-stroke diesel. The engine was mated with a three-speed T-90A transmission and a model 18 transfer case. Other changes included a reinforced frame, a 24-volt electrical system, and limited-slip Spicer 44 front and 53 rear axles.

== Foreign market models ==
Numerous versions of FC models (most not available in the domestic market) were manufactured in many other nations under collaboration agreements with successive owners of Jeep: Willys-Overland, Kaiser Jeep, and American Motors Corporation (AMC).

=== India ===
Mahindra FJ-470 or 460 with a minibus body

Mahindra & Mahindra Limited in Bombay (Mumbai), India began its vehicle business in 1947 by assembling 75 complete knock down (CKD) Jeeps in Mazagon, Bombay. The company started FC-150 production in India in 1965 and later expanded the model range for the domestic market to include the FC-170, as well as its own intermediate-sized FC-160.

The FC-160 (and later FJ-160) uses a 93 in (240 cm) wheelbase. The pick-up box was by Mahindra, and other bodies were available. The "cowl and chassis only" FC-160 model was popular during the 1970s for conversion into mini-buses, ambulances, and other vehicles. Most have the basic front face of the FC. The manufacture of the Mahindra FC-160 pickup truck ended in the summer of 1999.

The FC-260 Diesel light truck was introduced in 1975. Mahindra's four-wheel drive FJ-460 (introduced in 1983) and two-wheel drive FJ-470 van or mini-bus vehicles retain the original Forward Control grille arrangement. These vehicles can accommodate from 11 to 15 passengers plus the driver.

=== Spain ===
In the 1960s, Kaiser-Willys licensed Vehículos Industriales y Agrícolas (VIASA) of Zaragoza in Aragon to build Jeeps in Spain. Beginning in 1970, the "SV" line of commercial trucks were built using the Commando 4x4 Jeep chassis, just like the FC models in the United States.

However, the Iberian models were unlike any Jeeps produced elsewhere and featured indigenously developed body designs. The SV line included the Campeador (one-ton pickup), Duplex (double cab pickup), Furgon (one-ton van), and the Toledo (9-seat luxury passenger van). Two engines were available: the Super Hurricane in-line six petrol and a Perkins 4-cylinder diesel. The Willys 226.2 cu in (3,707 cc)engine was rated at 105 hp (78 kW; 106 PS) and 190 lb⋅ft (258 N⋅m) of torque while the 3.0 L Perkins diesel produced 62 hp (46 kW; 63 PS) and 143 lb⋅ft (194 N⋅m) of torque. The diesel achieved almost 30 mpg_{‑US} (7.8 L/100 km; 36 mpg_{‑imp}).

During the late 1970s, VIASA was absorbed by Ebro trucks, a division of Motor Ibérica. Production of the full SV line continued until 1985, including versions for the Spanish army.

Nissan took complete control of Ebro in 1987, and the company was named Nissan Motor Ibérica.

== Wide-track concept ==
Kaiser contracted Crown Coach Corporation, a bus manufacturer, to build a "Wide-Trac" forward control concept car that combines elements of the original Jeep FC trucks, the VIASA SV pickup, and Brooks Stevens' 1960 proposed facelift.
