= Toledo Complex =

American automobile factory

Toledo Assembly Complex
- The plant has been home to the Jeep brand since the 1940s.
- Operated: 1910–present
- Location: 4400 Chrysler Drive; Toledo, Ohio, United States
- Coordinates: 41.69°N 83.53°W
- Industry: Automotive
- Products: Off-road vehicles
- Employees: 6,093 (2022)
- Area: 312 acres (1.26 km^{2})
- Volume: 3,640,000 sq ft (338,000 m^{2})
- Owners: Willys-Overland (1910–1953); Kaiser Jeep (1953–1970); American Motors (1970–1988); Chrysler (1988–present)

The Toledo Assembly Complex is a 312-acre (126 ha) automotive manufacturing facility in Toledo, Ohio. It currently houses a 3,640,000 sq ft (338,000 m^{2}) factory owned by Stellantis North America. Originally established as an assembly plant by Willys-Overland in 1910, the complex has been a central hub for Jeep vehicle production since the 1940s. The site is divided into two primary facilities: Toledo North and Toledo South, with the latter encompassing the former Stickney and Parkway plants.

== Toledo South ==
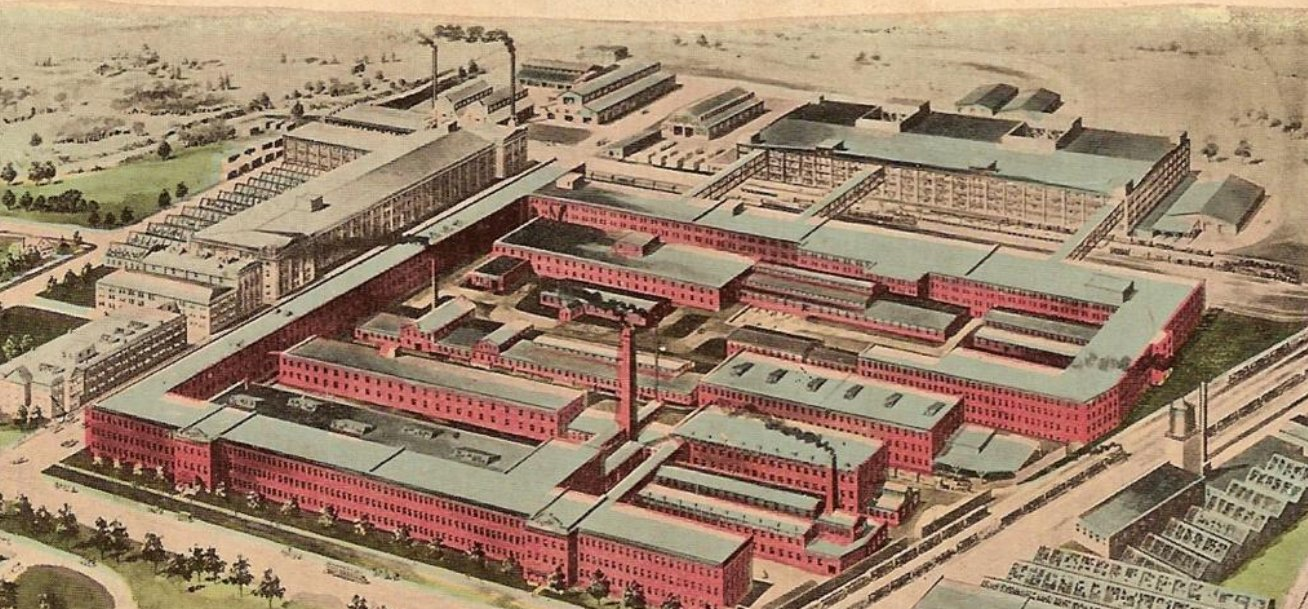
The original Willys-Overland factory (1915)

The Toledo South Assembly Plant is the original home of Jeep production, with roots tracing back to the Willys-Overland factory. It has been a key site for manufacturing several iconic Jeep models.

The plant began as a bicycle factory in 1904 before Willys-Overland purchased it in 1910. It became the primary production site for military Jeeps during World War II and the subsequent civilian Jeep CJ models. The facility was an amalgamation of buildings, including the "Parkway Annex" (1000 Jeep Parkway) and the "Stickney Plant" (4000 Stickney Ave). This decentralized layout required vehicle bodies to be painted at Parkway and transported via tunnels and bridges to Stickney for final assembly.

=== Parkway ===
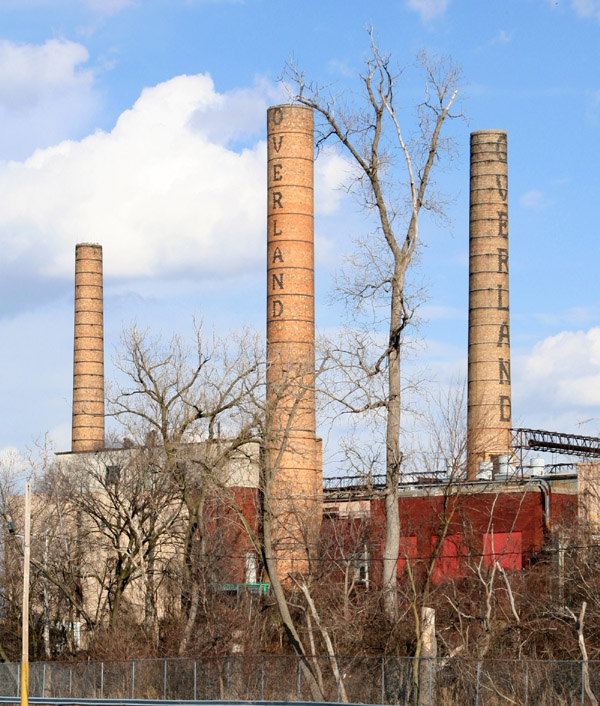
Smokestacks dating from 1910 at the Parkway Annex, Toledo Complex. The outer stacks were demolished in 2007

The Parkway Annex (41°40′57″N 83°33′55″W) was opened in 1904 as a bicycle factory. Its use as an automobile assembly plant dates from 1910 when Willys-Overland purchased it. The facility became a Toledo landmark in 1915 with three prominent brick smokestacks spelling out "Overland" in bricks. The plant began producing Jeep vehicles in the 1940s.

After Chrysler acquired American Motors Corporation (AMC) in 1987, the facility was renamed the Toledo Assembly Plant. From 1993 until 2006, the Parkway plant was responsible for the basic assembly and painting of the Jeep Cherokee (XJ) and later the Jeep Wrangler (TJ), with final assembly occurring at the Stickney plant.

One-third of the plant, including the Jeep museum, was demolished in 2002, and the remainder was razed in 2007, with two of the three smokestacks being removed.

The site was acquired by the Toledo–Lucas County Port Authority in 2010 and redeveloped into an industrial park, which now includes a new Dana facility producing Jeep axles and a Detroit Manufacturing Systems plant.

The remaining "Overland" smokestack left alone by Chrysler was preserved and dedicated as a monument in August 2013 to honor the plant's history and its workforce.

=== Stickney ===
The Stickney Plant (41°41′40″N 83°31′31″W) was opened in 1942 by Autolite and sold to Kaiser-Jeep in 1964. It was a machining and engine plant until 1981, when AMC converted it for vehicle production. The original Jeep Wagoneer (SJ) was made there from 1981 until the Grand Wagoneer model was discontinued in 1991. After that, Chrysler moved the final assembly of the Wrangler to this facility.

Chrysler also renamed this facility to Toledo Assembly Plant after the automaker acquired AMC in 1987.

== Toledo Supplier Park ==
Both the Stickney and Parkway sites were closed in 2007 by DaimlerChrysler. The Toledo Supplier Park was developed on the Stickney site.

The "supplier park" manufacturing model involves on-site third-party suppliers. In this case, KUKA Toledo Production Operations (KTPO) operates the body shop and Mobis North America (formerly OMMC), owned by Hyundai Mobis assembles the chassis, axles, and powertrain. The Toledo Supplier Park allows for greater efficiency by having parts manufactured directly next to the final assembly line, which is operated by Stellantis North America.

The Jeep Wrangler (JK) was produced here until 2018 when the plant was retooled to build the Jeep Gladiator (JT) pickup truck, which began shipping in 2019.

== Toledo North ==
The "Toledo North Assembly Plant" (41°41′46″N 83°31′10″W) is a modern addition to the complex on 200 acres (81 ha) at 4400 Chrysler Drive.

Construction on the 2,140,000 sq ft (199,000 m^{2}) plant began in 1997, with the facility opening in 2001. It was initially built for the production of the unibody Jeep Liberty (KJ). Production of the Dodge Nitro also began here in 2006.

The company announced a $500 million investment in 2011 to improve vehicle quality and increase capacity. This included expanding the body shop, numerous upgrades to the assembly plant, and a new "Metrology Center" to improve quality by measuring vehicles to verify fit and finish.

After production of the Liberty ended in 2012, the plant was retooled for the 2014 Jeep Cherokee (KL), which began production in 2013. In 2017, a $700 million investment was announced to shift Cherokee production to the Belvidere Assembly Plant in Illinois and retool Toledo North for the next-generation 2018 Jeep Wrangler (JL), launched later that year. Production of the Jeep Wrangler 4xe Plug-in Hybrid began in 2020.

== Toledo Machining Plant ==
In 2018, Fiat Chrysler Automobiles FCA, the predecessor of Stellantis NA, announced that the Toledo Machining Plant would assemble the power electronics module and components for the Jeep Wrangler Plug-in Hybrid launched in 2020.

== Vehicles produced ==
=== Current ===
- Jeep Wrangler (1993–present)
- Jeep Gladiator (2020–present)

=== Past ===
- 1945–1986: Jeep CJ
- 1946–1965: Willys Jeep Station Wagon
- 1962–1988: Jeep Gladiator
- 1961–1975: Jeep Fleetvan
- 1963–1991: Jeep Grand Wagoneer
- 1974–1983: Jeep Cherokee
- 1984–2001: Jeep Cherokee/Wagoneer
- 1986–1992: Jeep Comanche
- 1994–1996: Dodge Dakota
- 2002–2012: Jeep Liberty/Cherokee
- 2007–2011: Dodge Nitro
- 2014–2017: Jeep Cherokee
