= Willys Jeep Station Wagon =

American automobiles produced by Willy and Kaiser Jeep (1944-1977)

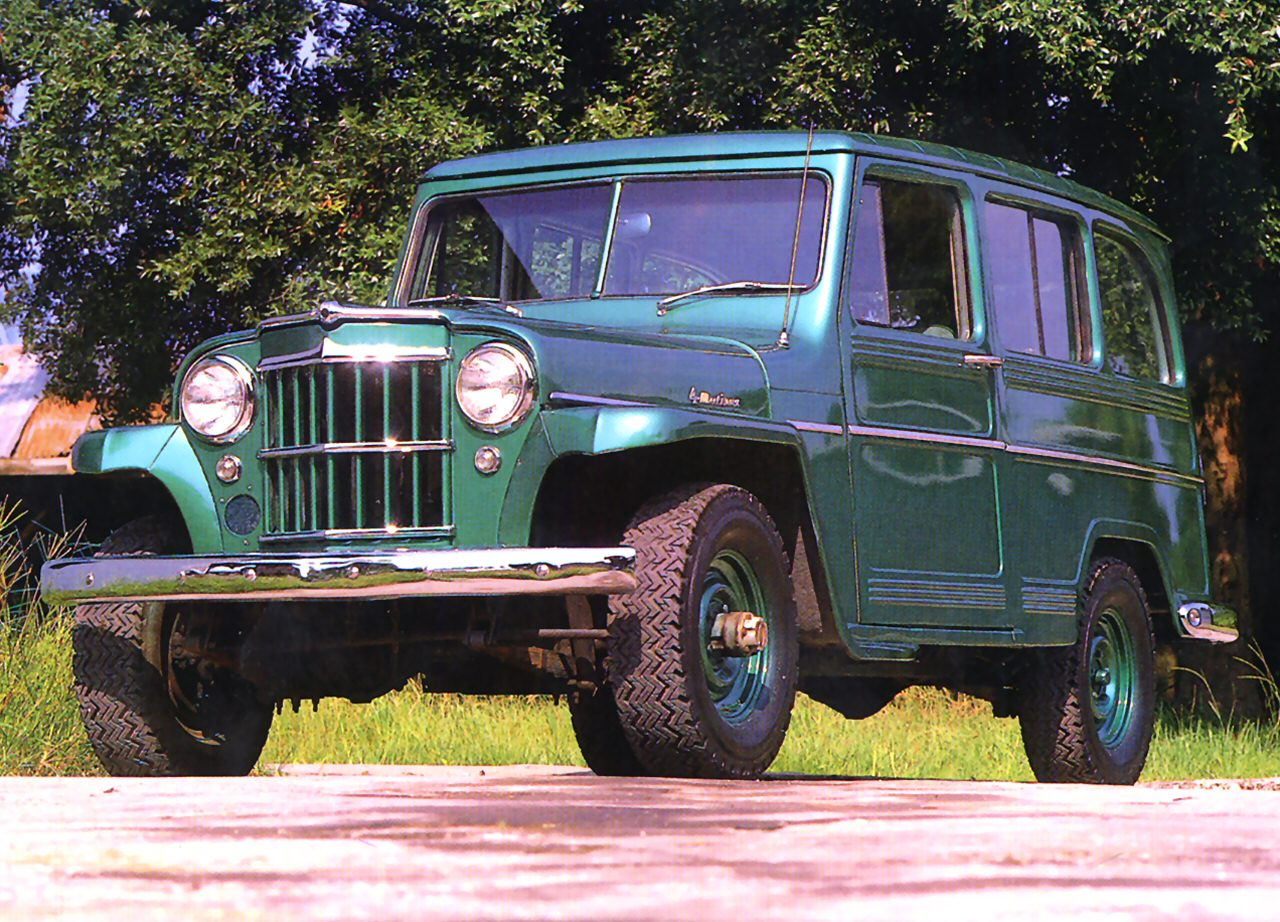

Overview
- Manufacturer: Willys-Overland (1946–1953); Willys Motors (1953–1963); Kaiser Jeep (1963–1964)
- Also called: Willys / Ford Rural (Brazil); IKA Estanciera (Argentina)
- Production: 1946–1964 (U.S.); 1957–1970 (Argentina); 1958–1977 (Brazil)
- Assembly: United States: Toledo, Ohio (Toledo Complex); Argentina: Santa Isabel (IKA); Brazil: São Bernardo do Campo (Willys Overland do Brasil S.A, later Ford Brasil)
- Designer: Brooks Stevens

Body and chassis
- Class: Mid-size sport utility vehicle
- Body style: 2-door or 4-door station wagon; 2-door panel truck
- Related: Willys Jeep Truck; Willys-Overland Jeepster

Powertrain
- Propulsion: rear wheel drive / optional four wheel drive

Dimensions
- Wheelbase: 104 in (2,642 mm)
- Length: 176.25 in (4,477 mm)
- Width: 72 in (1,829 mm)
- Height: 74 in (1,880 mm)
- Curb weight: 3,206 lb (1,454 kg); 4,500 lb (2,041 kg) GWV

Chronology
- Successor: Jeep Wagoneer

The Willys Jeep Station Wagon, Jeep Utility Wagon, and Jeep Panel Delivery are automobiles produced by Willys and Kaiser Jeep in the United States from 1946 through 1964, with production in Argentina and Brazil continuing until 1970 and 1977, respectively. They were the first mass-market all-steel station wagons designed and built as a passenger vehicle. After the 1949 introduction of a four-wheel drive option, the two-wheel-drive version was sold as "Station Wagon", while the four-wheel-drive models were marketed as "Utility Wagon".

The four-wheel-drive Willys Jeep Wagon is often considered the first production sport utility vehicle.

Over 300,000 wagons and their variants were built in the United States. The Jeep Wagon was also assembled in several international markets under various forms of joint ventures, licenses, or knock-down kits.

== Development and reception ==
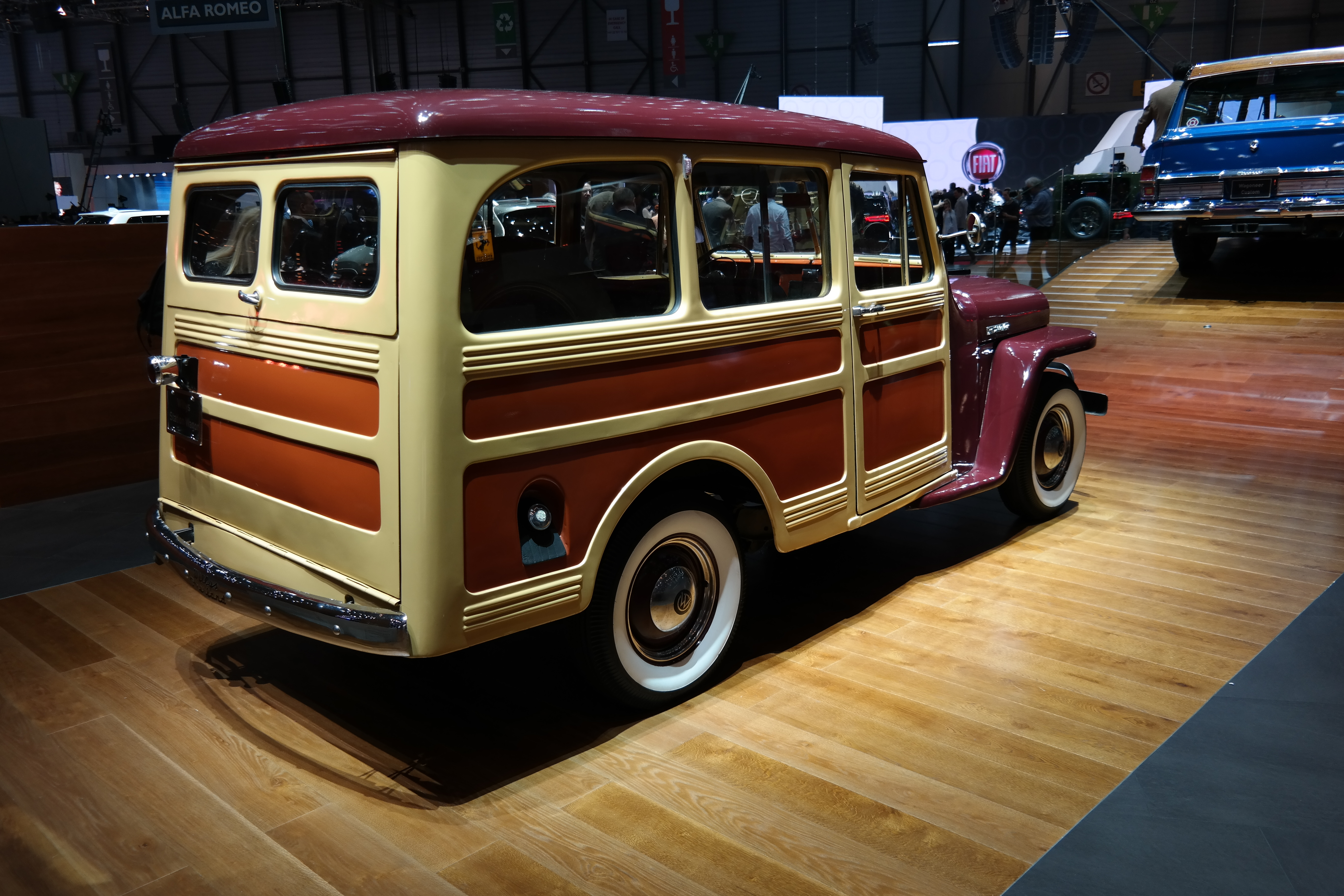
The Wagon's all-steel body was sometimes painted as a woodie

Following the success and fame of the World War II rugged four-wheel-drive Jeep, Willys-Overland did not have a modern car ready for the post-war civilian marketplace. Executive vice president and chief engineer, Barney Roos, was concerned the company would not survive and in a telephone call to Brooks Stevens "implored" him to immediately help out. Stevens, an industrial designer, was inspired by the challenge. He responded with a design that expanded the four-wheel-drive platform into a more car-like vehicle. The resulting station wagon-like body style of the Willys is sometimes referred to as the original sport utility vehicle (SUV).

Willys did not stamp and make bodies for its vehicles. Car body manufacturers were facing high demand in the post-war period, and Willys was known to have limited finances. Brooks therefore designed bodies that could be built by sheet metal fabricators who normally made parts for household appliances and could draw sheet metal (pulling or pushing a flat metal into a 3D shape) no more than 6 inches (152 mm).

The steel body was efficient to mass-produce, easier to maintain, and safer than the real wood-bodied station wagon versions at the time. Within the first two years of the Jeep Wagon's production, the only manufacturer in the United States with a station wagon that was comparable in price was Crosley, which introduced an all-steel wagon in 1947.

The initial Willys Station Wagons were introduced in July 1946 equipped with four-cylinder rear-wheel-drive (model 4-63). A six-cylinder version was introduced for the 1948 model year. Sales were good for the small automaker. The 4x4 versions were introduced in 1949 to complete in a market segment that Willys dominated. However, the two-wheel-drive versions outsold the 4x4 until the 1950s.

The Jeep Wagon was the first Willys product to feature an independent front suspension. Barney Roos, Willys' chief engineer, developed a system based on a transverse seven-leaf spring. The system, called "Planadyne" by Willys, was similar in concept to the "planar" suspension Roos had developed for Studebaker in the mid-1930s.

In 1953, the U.S. military included the 4x4 station wagon models 463 and 473 as non (standard) classified 1/4-ton trucks under Standard Nomenclature List number G-740 in Technical Manual edition TM9-2800-1.

== Production timeline ==
=== United States ===
- 1946: introduced as the 463 with 10 slot flat grille in July 1946. Powered by the L-134 Go-Devil flathead inline-four engine.
- 1947: a panel van introduced with one seat, a pair of doors instead of the wagon's tailgate, and no side windows behind the front doors. 663 model introduced late in year, powered by the L-148 Lightning straight-six engine, 50 built.
- 1948: A luxury version, the Station Sedan, had solid body colors with basket-weave trim on the sides and was better finished than the wagon throughout.
- 1949: four-wheel drive became an option.
- 1950: the flat 10 slot grille was replaced by a pointed v-shape design with five horizontal bars across the vertical ones. New 1950 model was introduced 16 April, with leftover 1949 models continued into March. The 473 model came with the new 'F-134 Hurricane, and the 673 model included the new 161 cu in (2.6 L) version of the Lightning six. The station sedan discontinued.
- 1952: the flathead Lightning was dropped in favor of the F-161 Hurricane, installed in the 685 model. Key start replaces floor start; chrome strip added to hood, cowl sides on Wagon only; flush side mount tail lights replace single light.
- 1954: the first under Kaiser's ownership. The 6-226 Super Hurricane, a flathead inline six, was introduced. This was a version of the Kaiser Supersonic/Continental Red Seal engine and became available on four-wheel drive versions in 1954. Minor revisions were made to front end styling that year, including the reduction of the number of horizontal slats in the grille from five to three. There were few other changes between 1953 and 1955.
- 1955: a number of new models were added. The 6-226 model lineup gained stripped chassis, flat face cowl, cowl/windshield, and ambulance models. The 475 line received only the cowl/windshield. Willys withdrew from the passenger car market and renamed the vehicle the Utility Wagon. The seventh seat and the overdrive were deleted, and the Planadyne front suspension used with the two-wheel drive wagon was replaced with a beam axle. Warn hubs, with which the front drive mechanism could be disengaged by turning the hubs by hand, became optional on four-wheel drive models.
- 1958: the Maverick model introduced, a more luxurious version of the two-wheel drive wagon. It was only available with the four-cylinder engine. The main upgrades were in the introduction of two-tone paint with matching interior in two tones and a standard AM radio. It was distinguished by its extra stainless steel trim ring under the windows. The Maverick name came from the TV series of the same name, of which Willys was a sponsor.
- 1959: 4X2 Wagon models have one piece windshield.
- 1960: 4X4 Wagons and Delivery models receive one-piece windshield (late year).
- 1962: the 6-230 Tornado OHC engine was introduced in May, replacing the flathead.
- 1964: production ends as the Willys model had been phased out by the Jeep Wagoneer, which was introduced in the 1963 model year. Some leftover 1964 models were renumbered by dealers with 1965 VINs.
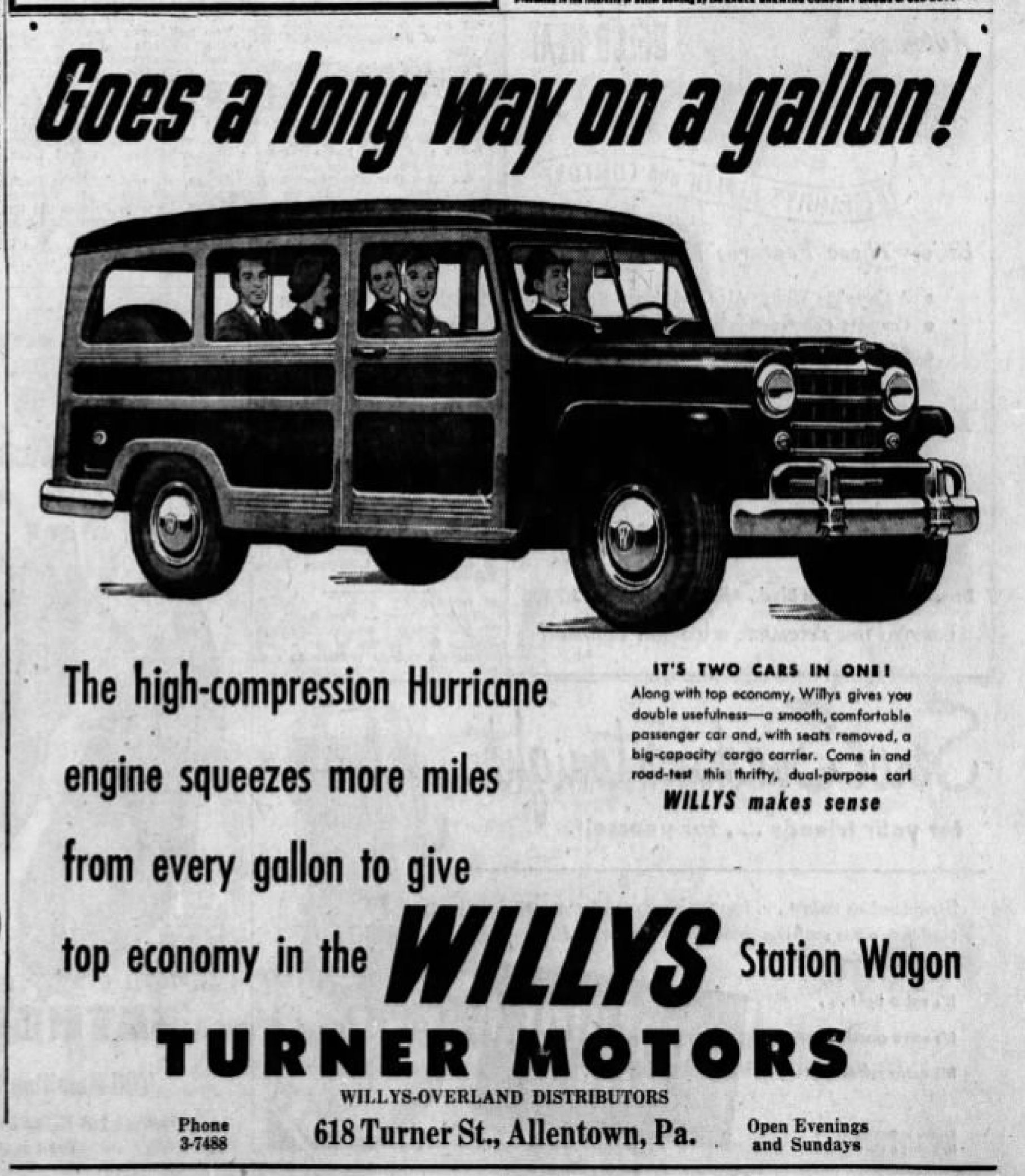
1951 advertisement for the Willys Station Wagon

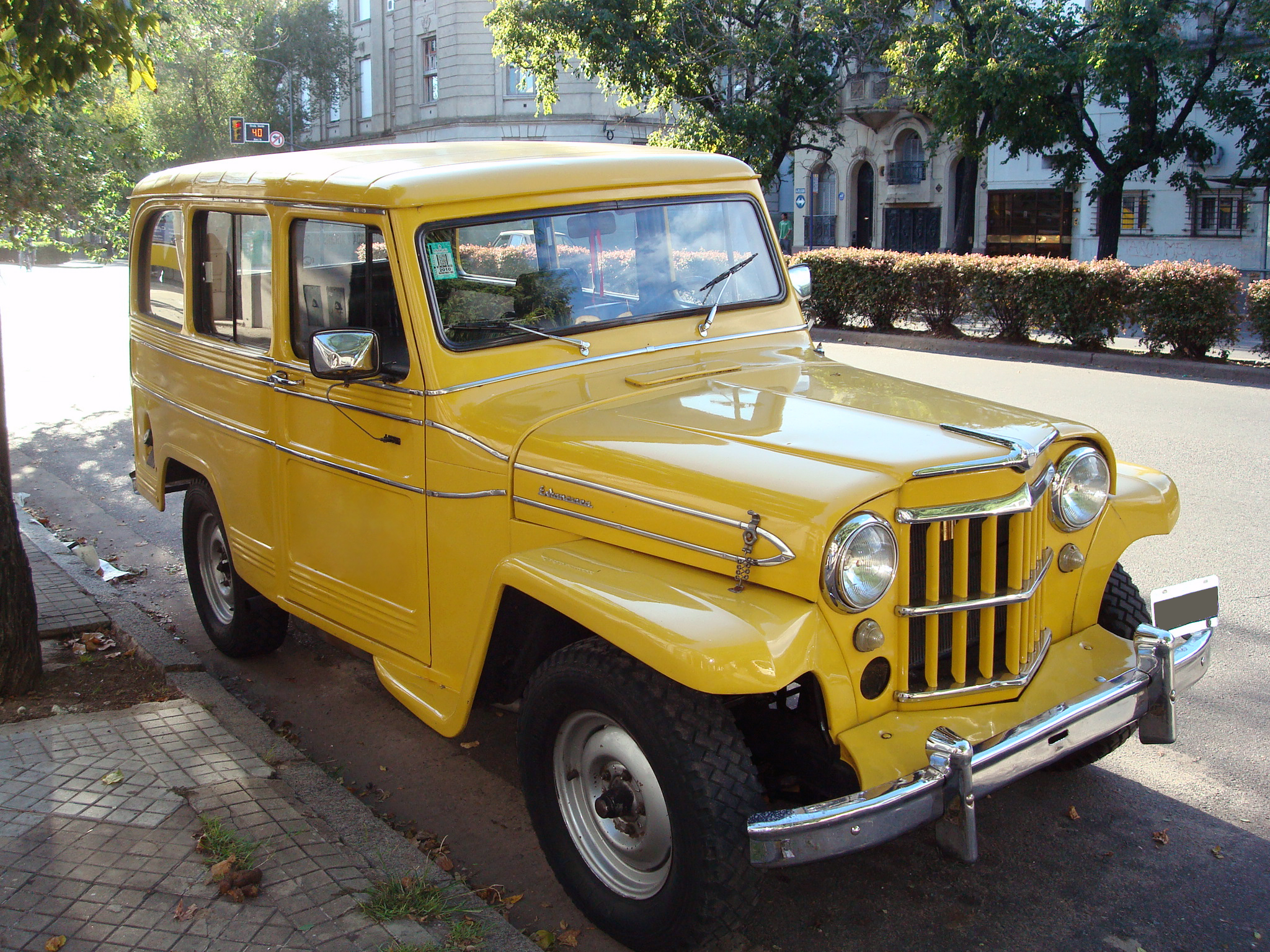
Willys Jeep "Estanciera" made by IKA in Argentina.

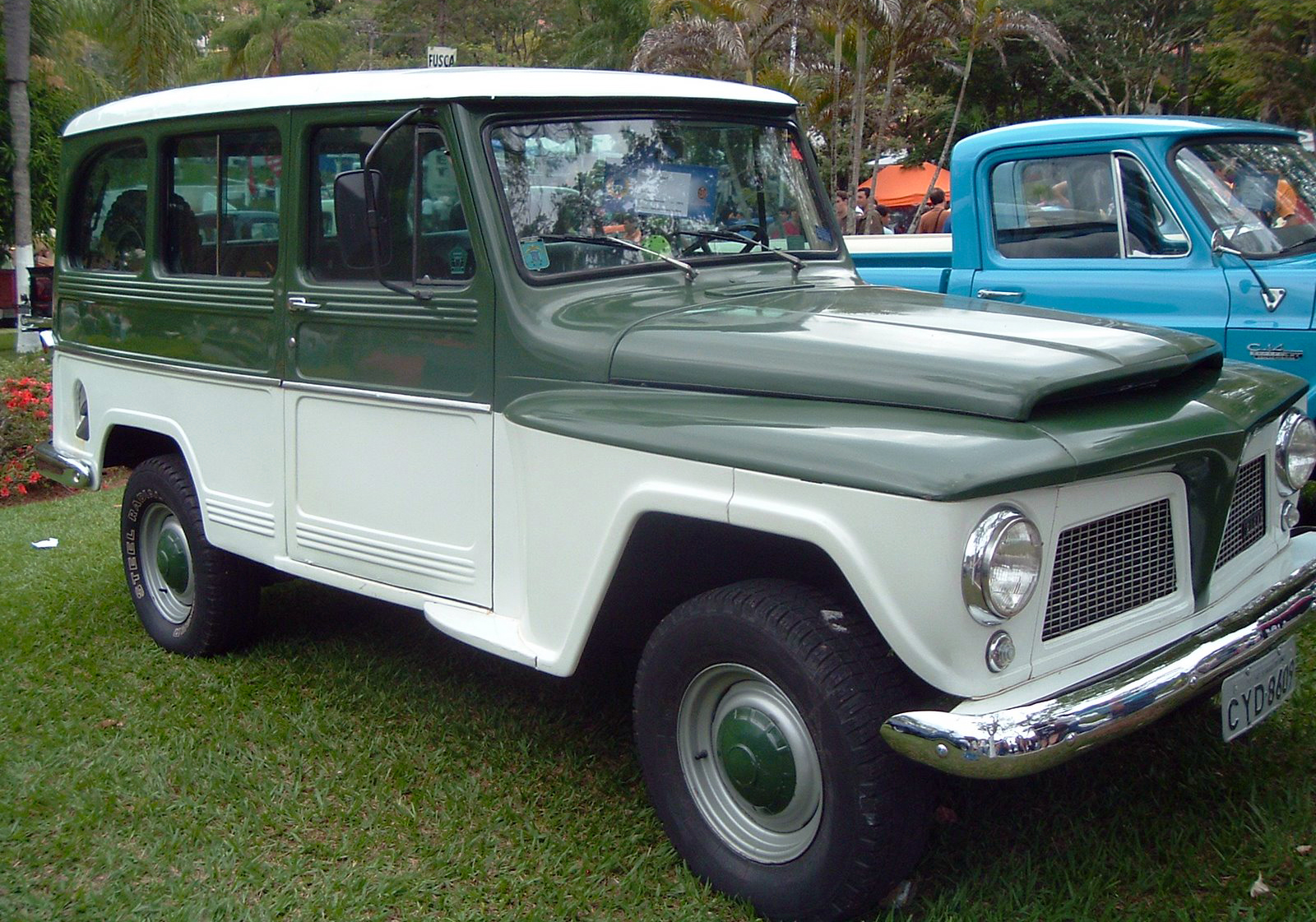
Brazilian-built Willys Rural (later renamed as the Ford Rural)

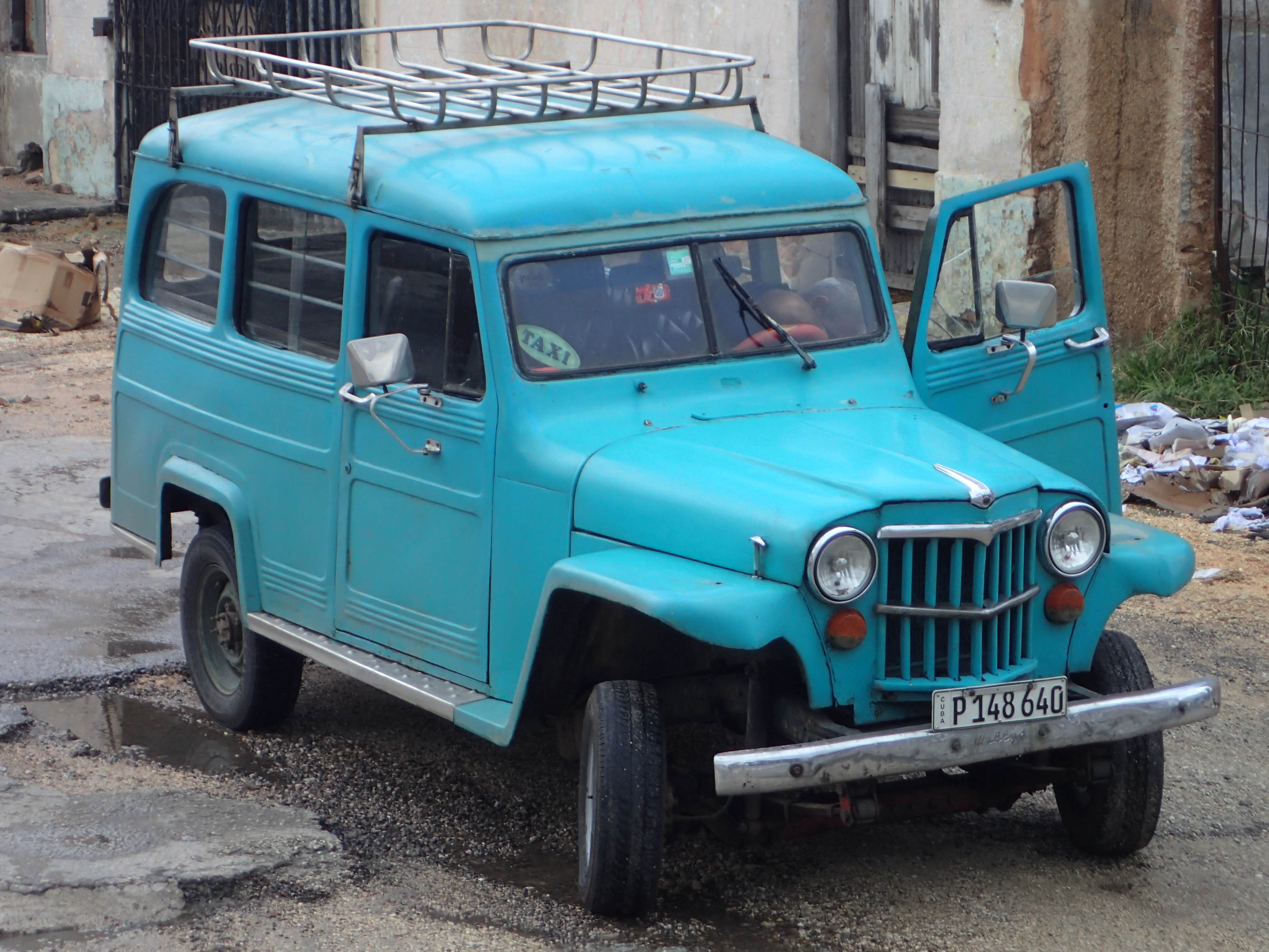
Willys Jeep Station Wagon used as taxi in Cuba

=== Argentina ===
The Jeep Wagon was produced as the IKA Estanciera by Industrias Kaiser Argentina from 1957 to 1970.

=== Brazil ===
In the 1950s, a version based on the 1946 US version was introduced. A truck version, the Pickup, was introduced in 1961. Ford Brazil bought the Willys factory in 1967 and the Rural Jeep wagon was renamed Ford Rural, and the truck was later named the Ford F-75 in 1972. Both models were offered with an inline-six engine, which was the first gasoline engine manufactured in Brazil. They were available in RWD or 4X4 configuration. The Rural was discontinued in 1977, and the F-75 in 1981.
