= Kaiser Jeep =

US motor vehicle manufacturer (1953-1970)

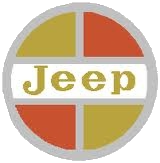
- Formerly: Willys Motors (1953–63)
- Industry: Automotive
- Predecessor: Kaiser Motors; Willys-Overland
- Founded: 1953
- Defunct: 1970; 56 years ago
- Fate: Bought out by American Motors in 1970
- Successor: Jeep (Note: As a wholly owned division of FCA US LLC); AM General; AMC
- Key people: Stephen A. Girard Jr. (president)
- Products: Trucks; Automobiles; Military vehicles Sport utility vehicles

Kaiser Jeep resulted from the 1953 merger of Kaiser Motors, an independent passenger car maker based in Willow Run, Michigan, with the Toledo, Ohio-based Willys-Overland Company.

Willys-Overland had been at one point before World War II the U.S.'s second-largest car-maker after Ford, but their fortunes waned during the 1930s. Willys survived during the war by getting the primary contract to build the U.S. World War II jeeps for the American and Allied armed forces. From 1945, Willys focused almost exclusively on selling Jeep-branded vehicles, both civilian and commercial, as well as government and military jeeps.

For Kaiser, the Jeep brand and its models were considered the crown jewels in the merger with Willys-Overland. In 1955, Kaiser phased out all Kaiser and Willys passenger car lines, and Kaiser (initially still under the name 'Willys Motors') became entirely focused on Jeep products in most markets. In 1963, the company consolidated all corporate holdings under the name of Kaiser Jeep Corporation, discarding the Willys name.

Following this, American Motors Corporation (AMC) negotiated with Kaiser Jeep to purchase the company. The deal was finalized in 1970, and Kaiser Jeep became "Jeep Corporation," a wholly owned subsidiary of AMC.

== History ==
Founded by John North Willys, Willys-Overland was successful in car making. At one point, Willys-Overland was the U.S.'s second-largest car maker after Ford, but their success waned during the 1930s. Willys benefited from the production during World War II by winning the primary contract to build Willys MB 1/4‑ton jeeps for the U.S. and Allied armed forces to the factory's maximum capacity. Willys also began almost immediately to brand the term "Jeep" through advertising, applying to trademark it in 1943, and receiving the "Jeep" trademark in 1950. From 1945, Willys focused almost exclusively on selling Jeep branded vehicles, civilian and commercial, as well as utility and military jeeps for (the U.S.) governments.

While Joseph W. Frazer, earlier a one-time president of Willys-Overland, had left Kaiser-Frazer ca. 1950, going it alone, Henry J. Kaiser's finances ultimately dictated that he could no longer compete with the established manufacturers in the U.S. passenger car business, but he saw value in Willys' Jeep line. Thus, Kaiser pursued a merger between Kaiser Motors and Willys, arranged in 1953, and the assets were bundled into Kaiser-Willys Corporation. Willys-Overland was renamed Willys Motors at first, and for the next ten years.

In 1955, Kaiser phased out both the Kaiser and Willys passenger car lines and shipped the dies to Argentina, where the joint venture with the Argentine government-owned Industrias Kaiser Argentina (IKA) continued to build cars through 1977, when Renault took over.

=== New Kaiser era models ===
Under Kaiser's management, Jeep introduced the Forward Control vans and the groundbreaking Wagoneer, which offered unprecedented comfort and available (luxury) options combined with serious off-road capability.

Under the name "Willys Motors", the Jeep-based truck line continued in the United States, including the CJ (Civilian Jeep) Series, all steel Willys Jeep Wagon (station wagon), and Jeep Forward Control FC-150 and FC-170 models that were introduced in 1957. In 1962, Willys introduced the Jeep Wagoneer as a 1963 model to replace the 1940s-style Jeep station wagons. Designed by industrial designer Brooks Stevens, the Wagoneer (later known as the Grand Wagoneer) would remain in production with the major architecture unchanged for two more decades after AMC's 1970 purchase of Jeep – until 1991 – and is often credited as the first true sport utility vehicle (SUV). Also, in 1962, The original Jeep Gladiator full-sized pickup truck was introduced to replace the previous, also Brooks Stevens designed Willys Jeep Truck.

As part of a general push to place all of their corporate holdings under the Kaiser name, in 1963, the company changed the name of Willys Motors to Kaiser Jeep Corporation.

In 1967, Kaiser Jeep resurrected the Jeepster (in concept; the vehicle was all-new, albeit loosely based on the Willys Jeepster), which had been produced by Willys-Overland from 1948 to 1950. It was available in three models (roadster, convertible, and pickup) and proved to be moderately popular (see Jeepster Commando).

American Motors Corporation (AMC), looking to expand their product line, had on a couple of occasions entered into negotiations with Kaiser executives with the intent of purchasing the company. The deal was finalized in 1970, and Kaiser Jeep became "Jeep Corporation," a wholly owned subsidiary of AMC.

Chrysler Corporation in turn acquired AMC in 1987, again (just like in the Kaiser-Willys merger) mainly for the Jeep brand.
