= List of Jeep vehicles =

Jeep logo

Jeep, a former American automobile marque, now owned by multi-national corporation Stellantis, has produced numerous vehicles since its inception in 1943.

== Current models ==
Body style	Model			Current generation			Vehicle description
Body style	Image	Name(s)	Introduction (cal. year)	Model code	Introduction (cal. year)	Main markets	Vehicle description
Body-on-frame SUV		Grand Wagoneer	2021	WS	2021	North America	Full-size SUV (Wagoneer, until 2025), full-size luxury SUV (Grand Wagoneer). Long-wheelbase version is known as the Grand Wagoneer L.
Body-on-frame SUV		Wrangler	1986	JL	2017	Global	Compact SUV (2-door), mid-size SUV (Unlimited and 4-door). PHEV version available as the Wrangler 4xe.
Body-on-frame SUV		Wrangler Unlimited	1986	JL	2017	Global	Compact SUV (2-door), mid-size SUV (Unlimited and 4-door). PHEV version available as the Wrangler 4xe.
Crossover SUV		Avenger	2022	JJ	2023	Europe, etc.	Subcompact SUV. Mild hybrid and BEV are available.
Crossover SUV		Compass	2007	J4U	2025	Global	Compact crossover SUV smaller than the Cherokee. PHEV version is available.
Crossover SUV		Commander/ Meridian	2021	H1; H6	2021	Latin America, India	Mid-size crossover SUV based on the Compass produced in Brazil and India. Named the Meridian in India.
Crossover SUV		Cherokee	1974	KM	2025	North America, etc.	Mid-size crossover SUV.
Crossover SUV		Grand Cherokee	1992	WL	2021	North America, etc.	Mid-size crossover SUV. Long-wheelbase version is known as the Grand Cherokee L. PHEV version is available for the short-wheelbase model.
Crossover SUV		Grand Cherokee L	1992	WL	2021	North America, etc.	Mid-size crossover SUV. Long-wheelbase version is known as the Grand Cherokee L. PHEV version is available for the short-wheelbase model.
Crossover SUV		Recon	2025		2025	North America, etc.	BEV mid-size crossover SUV based on STLA Large platform.
Crossover SUV		Renegade	2014	BU; B1; BQ	2014	Global	Subcompact crossover SUV.
Crossover SUV		Wagoneer S	2024		2024	North America, etc.	BEV mid-size crossover SUV based on STLA Large platform.
Pickup truck		Gladiator	2019	JT	2019	Global	Mid-size pickup truck based on the Jeep Wrangler (JL).

== Civilian models by code ==
=== CJ ===
- CJ-2A (1945–1949)

The first Civilian Jeep put into production by Willys, marketed as the "Universal Jeep". 212,402 units were produced.

- CJ-3A (1949–1953)

A refined CJ-2A, the CJ-3A featured a redesigned one-piece windshield with air vents below the glass. 131,843 units were produced. Derived from it was the first post-war military jeep: the M38.

- CJ-3B (1953–1968)

Essentially a CJ-3A fitted with a taller hood (the CJ-3B is also known as the "high-hood" Jeep) to accommodate the Willys Hurricane engine. 155,494 were built over its 15-year lifespan. Most later ones were M606 military jeeps shipped to South America.

- CJ-5 (1955–1983)

Introduced in late 1954 as a 1955 model, the CJ-5 was a civilian version of the M38A1 military Jeep used in the Korean War. The most noticeable addition was the new rounded hood, designed specifically to accommodate the Hurricane engine. 603,303 were built over nearly 30 years, making it the longest-lived and most popular "Universal".

- CJ-5A "Tuxedo Park" (1964–1967)

The Tuxedo Park had been an option package on the CJ-5 from 1961 to 1963, and by 1964 it was given its own model designation code. It featured more standard equipment (from 1965 onward standard equipment included the Dauntless V6 engine and bucket seats), but the Tuxedo Park never garnered a large customer base due to the higher base price. Only 7,394 CJ-5As were produced.

- CJ-6 (1955–1975)

Mechanically, the CJ-6 was nothing more than a CJ-5 with a 20 in. longer wheelbase. This addressed the most common customer complaint: lack of rear seat room. Despite ceding to consumer demand sales were modest, with only 50,172 units manufactured over 20 years.

- CJ-6A "Tuxedo Park" (1964–1967)

Similar to the CJ-5A, the CJ-6A was a "Tuxedo Park" version of the CJ-6. Like the CJ-5A it was not popular, with only 459 units produced, making it the rarest CJ.

- CJ-7 (1976–1986)

The CJ-7 was introduced in 1976 as a longer alternative to the CJ-5, as a compromise between the CJ-5 and CJ-6's wheelbase length. 379,299 were built. This was the first model to lack the "Universal Jeep" designation.

- CJ-8 "Scrambler" (1981–1985)

Once again consumers complained of too little room in the CJ-7. Like the CJ-6 before it, the Scrambler was an extended version of a smaller CJ, in this case the more modern CJ-7.

- CJ-10 (1981–1985)

The Jeep CJ-10 was a CJ-bodied pickup truck based on a heavily modified Jeep J10 pickup truck. Produced from 1981 to 1985, it was sold and designed for export markets; Australia in particular.

- CJ-10A (1984–1986)

The Jeep CJ-10A was a CJ-10-based flightline aircraft tug. Produced in Mexico from 1984 to 1986.

=== Willys Wagon and Willys Pickup ===
The Willys Wagon (1946–1965) and Willys Pickup (1947–1965) were full-size trucks featuring a wagon and pickup bodystyle respectively.

=== VJ ===
- Willys Jeepster (1948–1951)

The Willys Jeepster was a roadster designed to appeal to consumers who would not otherwise purchase a utilitarian CJ. Most of its parts were shared with the Jeep Wagon and Jeep Pickup. Unfortunately it proved to be unpopular, with its production life cut to only four years.

=== DJ ===
- DJ-3A (1955–1964)

The first of the Dispatcher Jeeps, the DJ-3A was essentially a two wheel drive version of the CJ-3A, designed for lighter-duty work not requiring four wheel drive.

- DJ-5 "Dispatcher 100" (1965–1967)

Like the DJ-3A, the DJ-5 was a two wheel drive version of the CJ-5.

- DJ-5A (1968–1970)

The DJ-5A was an offshoot of the DJ-5 featuring a specialized hardtop body and right hand drive steering, designed for use as a mail truck. It was also powered by a 153 in³ Chevrolet four-cylinder engine.

- DJ-5B (1970–1972)

Nearly identical to the DJ-5A, the DJ-5B was differentiated by its powertrain: a 232 in³ AMC six-cylinder engine.

- DJ-5C (1973–1974)

Nearly identical to the DJ-5B.

- DJ-5D (1975–1976)

Nearly identical to the DJ-5B.

- DJ-5E "Electruck" (1976)

A special electric version of the Dispatcher featuring an electric motor and battery pack in place of the original internal combustion engine.

- DJ-5F (1977–1978)

Nearly identical to the DJ-5B. The DJ-5F was also available with the AMC 258 engine.

- DJ-5G (1979)

Nearly identical to the DJ-5B. The DJ-5G was powered by a 2.0 L Volkswagen/Audi four-cylinder engine.

- DJ-5L (1982)

Nearly identical to the DJ-5B. The DJ-5L was powered by the Pontiac 2.5 L "Iron Duke" engine.

=== FC ===
- FC-150 (1956–1965)

The Forward Control trucks were essentially CJ-5s with a pickup bed and a flat-faced cab mounted on top of the engine. The FC-150 was mechanically nearly identical to the CJ-5.

- FC-170 (1957–1965)

The FC-150 was joined by a longer FC-170 model, equipped with the Willys Super Hurricane engine.

=== FJ ===
The FJ (1961–1965) was a DJ-3A fitted with a van body with a redesigned steering and seating arrangement similar to the Forward Control trucks. The Fleetvan Jeeps were designed specifically for moving cargo. The FJ-3 (easily distinguishable by horizontal grille slots) was offered specifically as a postal truck, while a longer FJ-3A was offered for other fleet purposes.

=== SJ ===
- Wagoneer (1963–1983)

The Wagoneer was designed to replace the Jeep Wagon, which had been produced relatively unchanged since 1946. It was leaps and bounds more sophisticated than its predecessor and competitors, offering modern amenities and car-like attributes such as an independent front suspension and a SOHC engine.

- J-series (1963–1988)

The Wagoneer's SJ chassis was also designed for a pickup truck bed, replacing the Willys Jeep Pickup. Originally named Gladiator, the truck underwent several name changes. Originally the Gladiator models were distinguished by a three-digit model code signifying wheelbase and gross vehicle weight rating. For 1965 the model codes were changed to four digits. The Gladiator name was dropped for 1972. In 1974, the model codes were changed for the final time to a two-digit code signifying GVWR. The sporty Honcho package was a popular option on half-ton J-10s.

- Super Wagoneer (1966–1969)

The Super Wagoneer was a special luxury version of the Wagoneer, featuring amenities such as air conditioning, an automatic transmission and a V8 engine as standard equipment. All of this was years prior to the existence of the Range Rover, considered by many to be the "original luxury SUV".

- Cherokee (1974–1983)

The Cherokee was added to the Jeep lineup as a sporty two-door model in 1974. A four-door body was later added in 1977.

- Grand Wagoneer (1984–1991)

The Wagoneer and Cherokee were replaced for 1984 by the smaller XJ Cherokee and Wagoneer. The SJ continued on as the Grand Wagoneer, the most opulent Jeep in the range.

=== C101 ===
- Jeepster Commando (1966–1971)

The Jeepster Commando was introduced in 1966 to appeal to consumers seeking a less utilitarian vehicle than the CJ. Based heavily upon the CJ-5, the Jeepster Commando was available in many body styles, including a convertible and pickup.

=== C104 ===
- Commando (1972–1973)

The C101 Jeepster Commando was redesigned in 1972 by AMC in order to accommodate AMC engines under its hood. The result was the new C104 Commando (Jeepster having been dropped from the name). The new front fascia, reminiscent of the Ford Bronco, was very unpopular, and Commando was dropped after its second year.

=== XJ ===
- Cherokee (1984–2001)

The most ambitious Jeep ever undertaken, the XJ (said to mean eXperimental Jeep, although the veracity of this is not well substantiated) was revolutionary in design: it was the first SUV to use a bespoke unibody chassis for more car-like performance and design attributes. The "UniFrame" chassis made the XJ light and maneuverable, while the QuadraLink front suspension gave it excellent off-road ability. The XJ Cherokee increased Jeep sales to levels never seen before, and proved to be the single most popular Jeep of all time, with over 2.8 million units sold.

- Wagoneer Limited (1984–1990)

The Wagoneer was offered alongside the Cherokee as a more luxurious model. Exterior changes were the only discernible differences, with a different grille and optional (plastic) wood panelling. Not to be confused with Grand Wagoneer SJ model.

=== MJ ===
- Comanche (1986–1992)

The Comanche was offered as a pickup version of the Cherokee. It is unique in that it is one of few unibody pickup trucks ever produced.

=== YJ ===
- Wrangler (1987–1995) (No Wrangler produced in 1996 as they revamped the design for the new TJ's in 1997)

The Wrangler, distinguished by its square headlamps, replaced the long-lived CJ. This model carried wider track axles and a stronger frame. It had more creature comforts and later on, had the benefit of the more efficient, fuel injected engines. The last model year of the YJ included galvanized bodies and larger U-joints.

=== ZJ ===
- Grand Cherokee (1993–1998)

Originally designed as the XJ's replacement, the ZJ was instead moved upmarket as the Grand Cherokee.

- Grand Wagoneer (1993)

A top-of-the-line Grand Cherokee featuring more standard equipment, such as a 5.2L Magnum V8. It was dropped after one year.

=== TJ ===
- Wrangler (1997–2006)

The YJ's replacement, the TJ, has been the most bold evolution of the "Universal" yet, with coil springs at all four wheels (it also returned to the circular headlights of the CJ). Halfway through the 2004 model year a long-wheelbase version of the TJ was released as the Wrangler Unlimited. The Wrangler Unlimited is unofficially referred to as the LJ to differentiate between the standard- and long-wheelbase models.

=== LJ ===
- Wrangler (2004–2006)

Unlimited Sport Edition: Came standard with 4.0 L and the Dana 44 rear limited slip axle with 3.73 gear ratio and the command-Trac NV231 transfer case. The LJ has all the sport options but with a 10 inch (250 mm) longer wheelbase aka the LWB or LJ model. The LJ Unlimited has 2 more inches of rear seat legroom and 13 inches more cargo storage. The LJ also came with 3500 lbs towing capacity compared to the 2000 lbs towing capacity of the TJ.

=== WJ ===
- Grand Cherokee (1999–2004)

An evolution of the ZJ, available in a straight 6 or V8. The 4.7 L Powertech V8 signalled a return to SOHC engines: it was the first in a new Jeep since the Kaiser Tornado engine was dropped from the lineup in 1965.

=== KJ ===
- Liberty (2002–2007)

The first new Jeep to feature an independent suspension since the 1963 Wagoneer, the Liberty (as it is known in North America; it goes by the name Cherokee in all other markets) replaced the XJ Cherokee in 2002. The Liberty comes with a 3.7 liter V6 engine, but was also available in the US in 2005–2006 with a 2.8L 4cylinder common rail diesel (CRD) engine.

=== WK ===
- Grand Cherokee (2005–2010)

Using the WJ and KJ as a springboard, the most recent WK Grand Cherokee has a greater blend of car-like ride and handling with traditional offroad capability. Grand Cherokee has been completely redone for 2011.

=== XK ===
- Commander (2006–2010)

With an exterior design reminiscent of the XJ, the Commander was the first seven-passenger Jeep, pushing the brand into market waters never before trodden. The Commander was discontinued due to the fact that the 2011 Dodge Durango is going to be Chrysler's 7 passenger SUV offering. It is rumored that the Commander may still be built overseas for certain markets.

=== JK ===
- Wrangler (2007–early 2018)

The new JK Wrangler includes a 3-piece hardtop roof. 2007–2011 used Chrysler's 3.8 L V6 engine. For 2012+, the Wrangler uses Chrysler's 3.6L Pentastar V6.

=== JKU ===
- 4 Door Wrangler (2007–2018)

Designation of the 4 door body style JK Wrangler.

=== MK ===
- Compass/Patriot (2007–2017)

The product of a Chrysler to bring 4x4 and fuel economy into the crossover market.

=== MP ===
- Compass (2017–2025)

A completely redesigned compact crossover developed by Fiat Chrysler Automobiles.

=== KK ===
- Liberty (2008–2012)

3.7 liters V6 210hp, some engines can run on E-85 fuel. Replaced the KJ.

=== WK2 ===
- Grand Cherokee (2011–2022)

3.6 Liter Pentastar V6, 5.7 Liter Hemi V8, 3.0 Liter EcoDiesel V6. 4x2 or 4x4 options. RWD platform. Replaced the WK.

=== KL ===
- Cherokee (2014–2023)

The new KL is the return of the Cherokee designation in a compact-wide body featuring a distinctive new front end and sporting a 2.4L Tigershark Inline 4, a 2.0L Hurricane turbo 4, or a 3.2L Pentastar V-6 mated with a 9-speed 948TE automatic transmission. The trailrated edition of the KL is referred to as the Cherokee Trailhawk.

=== BU/B1/BQ ===
- Renegade (2015–present)

The BU is Jeeps new 4x4 capable compact SUV based on the Fiat small-wide platform. Sporting a 2.4L Tigershark Inline 4-cylinder engine mated with a 9-speed automatic transmission or a 1.4L Turbo mated with a 6 speed manual. The TrailRated edition of the BU is referred to as the Renegade Trailhawk.

=== JL ===
- Wrangler (2018–present)

The JL utilized many of the same features as the JK, however modifications were done to incorporate an All Wheel Drive feature (full-time 4WD) and front axle disconnects for improved fuel mileage.

=== K8 ===
- Grand Commander (2018–2022)

=== JT ===
- Gladiator (2019–present)

Based on the Jeep Wrangler (JL) Unlimited

=== H1/H6 ===
- Commander (2021–present)
- Meridian (2021–present)

=== WL ===
- Grand Cherokee L (2021–present)
- Grand Cherokee (2022–present)

=== WS ===
- Wagoneer (2021–2025)
- Grand Wagoneer (2021–present)
- Wagoneer L (2023–2025)
- Grand Wagoneer L (2023–present)

=== JJ ===
- Avenger (2023–present)

=== J4U ===
- Compass (2025–present)

=== KM ===
- Cherokee (2026–present)

== Concepts and prototypes ==
- 1944 CJ-1 prototype
- 1949 Alcoa Aluminum-bodied Jeepster Coupe (prototype)
- 1949–1950 X-98 prototype; with flat fenders, but a rounded hood and grille like the CJ-5, it may have been the first F-head-powered Jeep
- 1950 CJ-4 prototype
- 1950 CJ-4M prototype
- 1950 CJ-4MA prototype
- 1952 CJ Coiler: experimental design for an all independent suspension, with portal-hub swing-axles and coil-springs
- 1958 DJ-3A Pickup: Prototype pickup truck version of the DJ-3A
- 1958 Jeep Creep: prototype utility vehicle; several versions built for tests, including a Postal rig and an aircraft tug
- 1959 Jeep J-100 Malibu and Berkeley: Later developed into the Wagoneer
- 1960 Jeep Wide-Trac: Concept for developing a low-cost vehicle for third-world countries
- 1962 The Brazilian Jeepster (prototype)
- 1963 Jeep XM-200: J200-based concept for developing a low-cost vehicle for third-world countries
- 1965 Jeep/Renault Model H: A light 4x4 prototype based on the Renault 16
- 1966 FWD Concept Jeepvair: Similar to the Model H but with a Chevrolet Corvair powertrain
- 1970 XJ001
- 1970 XJ002
- 1971 Jeep Cowboy: A design study using AMC's "compact" automobile platform
- 1977 Jeep II
- 1979 Jeep Jeepster II
- 1986 Cherokee Targa: A two-door Cherokee convertible (later revised as Jeep Freedom show car)
- 1987 Comanche Thunderchief: This vehicle was put into production later as the Comanche Eliminator
- 1989 Jeep Concept 1: Evolved into the ZJ Grand Cherokee
- 1989 Jeep Rubicon Wrangler: This vehicle was later put in production
- 1990 Jeep JJ: Essentially what would later be called the Icon
- 1990 Jeep Freedom: A revised Cherokee Targa
- 1991 Jeep Wagoneer 2000: A large design concept
- 1993 Jeep Ecco
- 1997 Jeep Cherokee Casablanca: A special edition of Cherokee, never produced
- 1997 Jeep Wrangler Ultimate Res: A tuned version of a regular TJ Wrangler developed for SEMA show
- 1997 Fender Jeep Wrangler
- 1997 Jeep Dakar: A fused version of a XJ Cherokee and TJ Wrangler
- 1997 Jeep Icon: A design study for the next-generation Wrangler
- 1999 Jeep Commander: methanol fuel cell drive train with electric motors
- 1999 Jeep Journey
- 1999 Jeep Jeepster Concept
- 2000 Jeep Cherokee Total Exposure
- 2000 Jeep Varsity: Later put into production as the Compass
- 2000 Jeep Commander Concept: Later put into production as the XK
- 2000 Jeep Willys
- 2001 Jeep Willys2
- 2002 Jeep Wrangler Tabasco
- 2002 Jeep Wrangler Patriot: A special decal package for the Wrangler X/Sport
- 2002 Jeep Wrangler Mountain Biker
- 2004 Jeep Grand Cherokee (WJ) Concierge
- 2004 Jeep Treo
- 2004 Jeep Res
- 2004 Jeep Liberator CRD
- 2005 Jeep Hurricane: The 4-wheel steering system allows the vehicle to have both a zero turning circle, and "crab" sideways. Its engine was later put in the Grand Cherokee (WK) SRT-8
- 2005 Jeep Gladiator Concept
- 2005 Jeep Aggressor (the Rezo)
- 2007 Jeep Trailhawk
- 2008 Jeep Renegade
- 2010 Jeep J8
- 2010 Jeep Nukizer: Design study inspired by the Military Kaiser M-715
- 2011 Jeep Wrangler Pork Chop
- 2011 Jeep Compass Canyon: uses a 2 1/8-inch (5.4 cm) lift
- 2011 Jeep Cherokee Overland
- 2012 Jeep Mighty FC: inspired by the 1956 to 1965 Forward Control vehicles Jeep sold
- 2012 Jeep J-12 Concept: recalling the 1962–1971 Gladiator pickups
- 2013 Jeep Wrangler Mopar Recon
- 2013 Jeep Grand Cherokee Trailhawk EcoDiesel
- 2013 Jeep Wrangler Stitch
- 2013 Jeep Wrangler Flattop: featuring a one-piece, windowless hardtop
- 2014 Jeep Wrangler Level Red
- 2014 Jeep Cherokee Dakar
- 2014 Jeep Wrangler MOJO
- 2015 Jeep Chief
- 2015 Jeep Wrangler Africa
- 2015 Jeep Wrangler Red Rock Responder
- 2015 Jeep Staff Car: a tribute to Jeep's military history starting with World War II
