= Jeepster =

Jeepster can mean any of the following:

== Vehicles ==
- Willys-Overland Jeepster, an automobile produced by Willys-Overland Motors from 1948 until 1950
- Jeepster Commando, an SUV produced by Kaiser Jeep from 1966 to 1973
- Chinkara Jeepster, an Indian produced GRP bodied Willys MB clone

== Music ==
- Jeepster (song) - a T. Rex song
- Jeepster Records - a record label
