= Bench seat =

Type of seat within automobiles

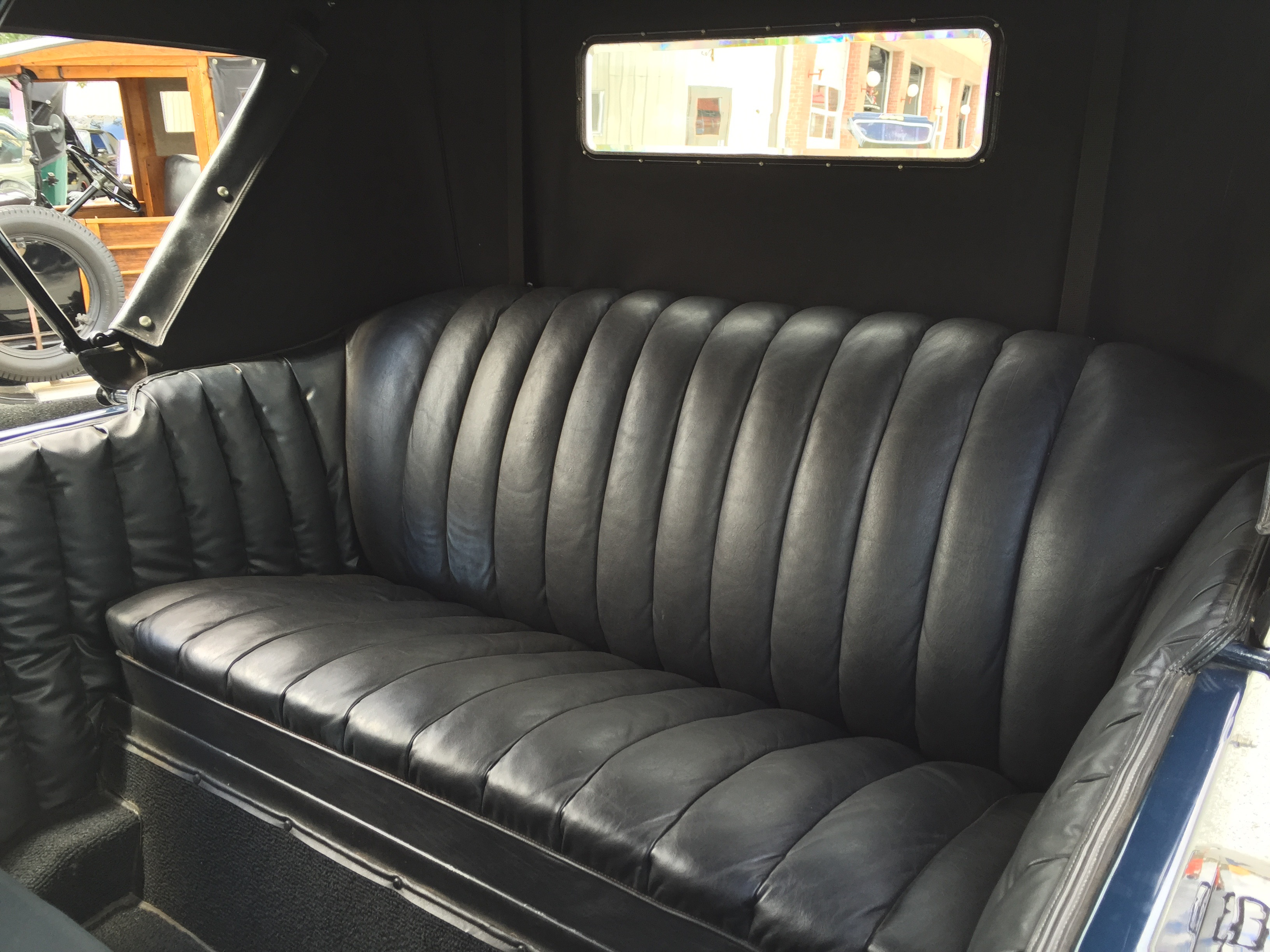
1923 Nash Six rear bench seat

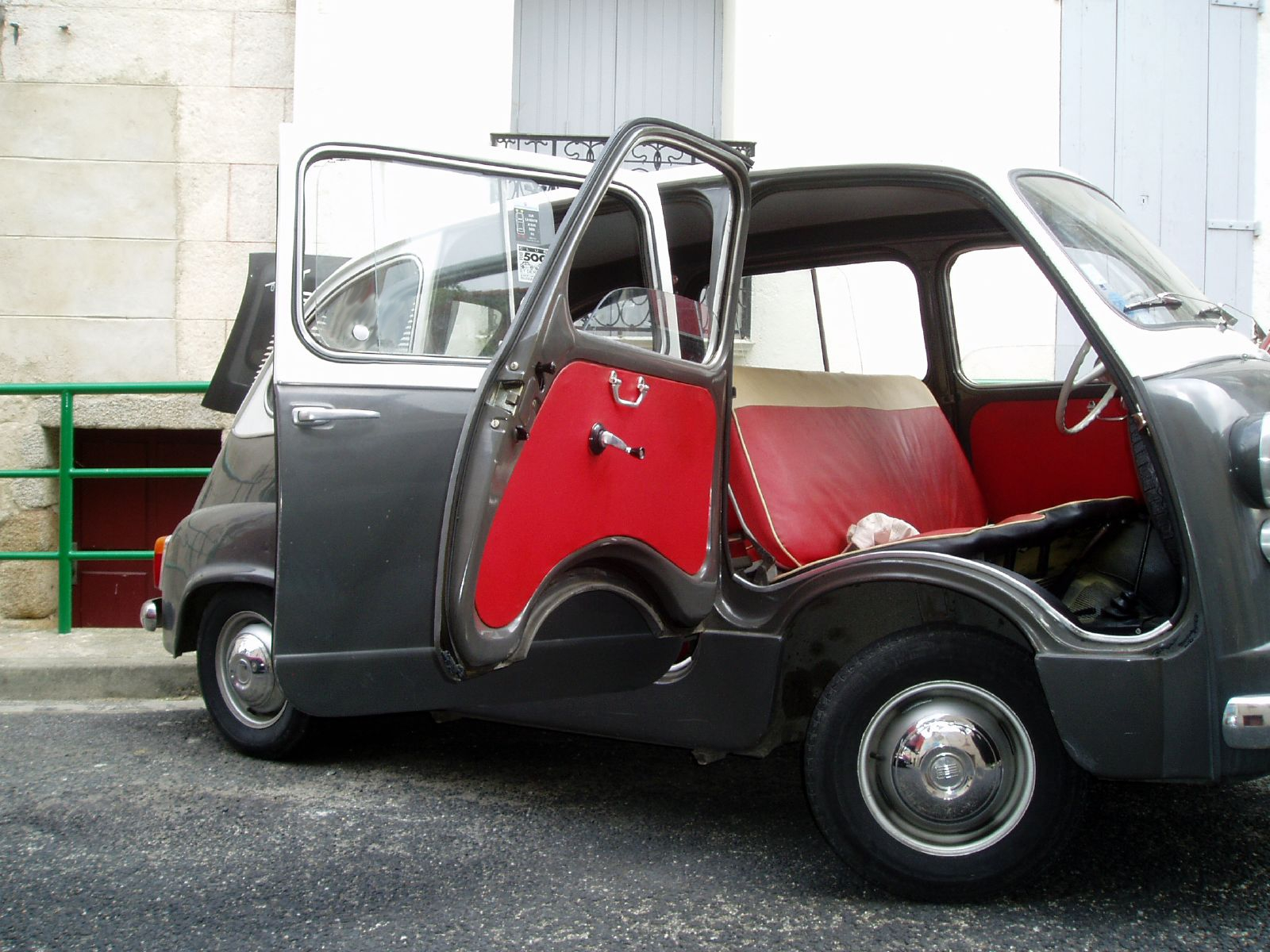
Fiat 600 Multipla with bench seat

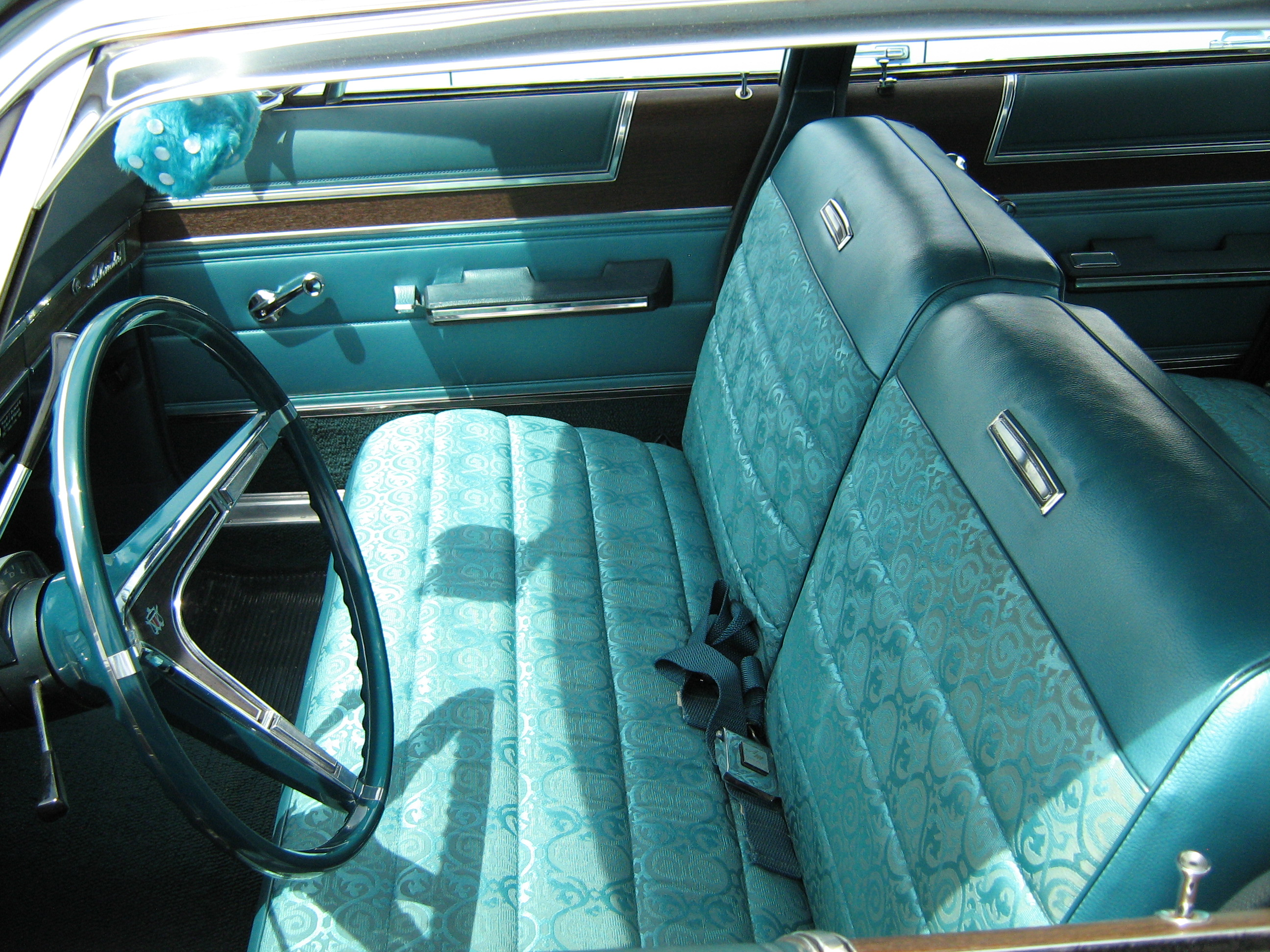
1967 AMC Ambassador with a reclining front bench seat offering room and seat belts for three adults

An automobile bench seat is a type of seating arrangement in a vehicle characterized by a continuous, full-width cushion to accommodate multiple passengers side-by-side. Unlike individual bucket seats, which are separated and contoured for a single occupant, a bench seat forms a continuous surface, often resembling a couch. Historically, a prevalent feature in various car segments, bench seats have declined in front-row applications but remain common in the rear and certain vehicle types.

== Design ==
A typical bench seat consists of a single, elongated cushion for seating and a corresponding backrest that spans the width of the vehicle's interior.

In older designs, both the cushion and backrest were often a single, solid piece. The front bench seat typically allowed three people to sit abreast, thus six passengers in most four-door sedans with this type of arrangement.

Modern variations, particularly in rear seating, frequently incorporate features that include:

- Split-folding functionality is common in station wagons, hatchbacks, SUVs, and minivans. A 60/40 or similar split allows portions of the seat back to be folded down independently. This enhances cargo versatility by increasing luggage space while allowing some passenger seating.
- Many bench seats, especially in sedans, include a central armrest that can be folded down from the backrest, providing individual comfort and cupholders when the middle seat is not occupied.
- Some sedans feature an opening in the center of the rear seat back, allowing long items like skis to pass through from the trunk into the passenger cabin without compromising seating for the two outboard passengers.
- Minivans like the Chrysler Pacifica have innovated bench seat design with systems like "Stow 'n Go," where the bench seat of the third row can fold flat into the floor, creating a large, unobstructed cargo area.

== History ==
Bench seats were ubiquitous in automobiles from their inception through the 1970s, particularly in U.S. vehicles. Early automobiles, often designed with utility and maximum passenger capacity in mind, naturally adopted the bench seat due to its simplicity and ability to accommodate more occupants.

Front bench seats were standard in most cars, allowing for three passengers abreast, which resulted in six-passenger capacity for typical four-door sedans. This design was economical to produce, offered ease of entry and exit, and fostered a sense of closeness, making them popular for social outings like drive-in movies. Examples include the compact-sized 1952 Willys Aero, which "could comfortably sit three abreast on its front and rear bench seats, and deliver excellent fuel economy." Nash Motors introduced what it called "airliner" reclining front bench seats that could transform into a bed. American Motors Corporation, the successor company to Nash promoted the adjustable bench seats on the 1959 larger Ramblers and Ambassadors as featuring several putatively restful positions, including a "comfortable nap couch for children and older adults." The reclining front seats were available on the lowest priced compact Rambler American models and became "a favorite at Lover's Lane". American Motors continued to feature individually adjustable and reclining front seats. However, a bench seat was standard on most base trim sedan models through the 1983 model year. The compact 1975 AMC Pacer introduced numerous designs that included the cab forward and room for three on the front bench seat.

In the United States, the popularity of European-influenced "sportier" cars, which often featured individual bucket seats, was a trend that gained traction after World War II. The returning soldiers sought out the smaller, more efficient European models they had encountered. This arrangement for the front created a space between the two seats, usually occupied by a shifter and hand brake. While bucket seats were originally associated with imported cars in the 1950s and 1960s, they became incorporated by U.S. automakers for their performance-oriented models.

The introduction of passive restraint systems in the 1970s played a significant role in the decline of the front bench seat for three-across passengers. Automatic driver and front passenger seatbelts could only be fitted to outboard seats. Furthermore, the rise of floor-mounted gear shifters and center consoles, which offered additional storage and a more integrated feel, naturally favored the separation provided by bucket seats. Nevertheless, in 1972, the Jeep Commando's center console for the automatic transmission was replaced with a steering column mounted shifter, allowing a bench seat option. Part of the success of the Chrysler K-cars, the Dodge Aries and the Plymouth Reliant, was that by retaining front bench seating rather than adopting bucket seats usually fitted to compacts, they could still function as the six passenger cars they were designed to replace and compete against.

By the 1990s, airbag systems were primarily designed for two front occupants, making the middle front seat less protected. Front bench seats became increasingly rare in sedans, even in large American premium models like the Ford Crown Victoria, Mercury Grand Marquis, and Lincoln Town Car, which discontinued them by 2011. The Chevrolet Impala was one of the last American sedans to offer a front bench seat option, ending it after the 2013 model year. However, bench seats remained prevalent in the rear rows of most sedans and continue to be a feature in the front and rear of pickup trucks, larger SUVs, and minivans, where passenger capacity and utility are paramount.

In Australia, the Holden Kingswood, Ford Falcon, and Chrysler Valiant were fitted with bench seats for many years. Until its discontinuation, the Falcon Ute was still offered a bench seat and column shift in the front. The availability of a front bench seat in the Falcon sedan and wagon lineups was only discontinued with the introduction of the FG Falcon in 2008. Holden offered a bench seat on the Commodore in the 1990s, originating with the VG Ute and ending with the end of VS series III production in 2000.

== Advantages ==
- The primary advantage of a bench seat is its ability to accommodate more passengers in a given row, typically three. This is especially valuable in vehicles designed for large families or work crews, such as minivans, large SUVs, and pickup trucks.
- In rear applications, split-folding bench seats significantly enhance cargo space and flexibility. Systems like Chrysler's Stow 'n Go allow seats to disappear entirely under the floor, providing a flat and expansive cargo area.
- Traditionally, bench seats were simpler and cheaper to manufacture compared to multiple individual bucket seats, requiring fewer parts and components.
- In vehicles with front bench seats, the absence of a console allowed for closer proximity between occupants, facilitating conversation and shared experiences.
- A second-row bench seat can be safer for families with young children, allowing an adult to sit between two children or access them more easily compared to captain's chairs. It also creates a continuous barrier that can prevent cargo from flying forward in a crash.

== Disadvantages ==
- Bench seats generally offer less individual contouring, lumbar support, and adjustability compared to bucket seats, which are designed to support each occupant ergonomically. Sharing the driver's adjustments can lead to less comfort for the other front seat occupants especially on long journeys.
- The shared nature of a bench seat means less personal space for each passenger, particularly when the middle seat is occupied.
- The middle passenger position in front bench seats has less protection in a frontal collision due to the absence of dedicated airbags. The lack of side bolstering also offers less lateral support for bench seat occupants during cornering, a safety concern in high-performance vehicles.
- The absence of a center console in front bench seat configurations means a loss of convenient storage compartments, cupholders, and charging ports often found between bucket seats.
- While some minivans have innovative tilt features for bench seats, captain's chairs in the second row often provide easier and more direct access to a third row of seating in SUVs and minivans.

== See also ==
- List of auto parts
