= Willys Lightning engine =

Series of I6 engines built by Willys

The Lightning engine is a Willys straight-6 produced in the 1940s and 1950s. The flathead engine featured four main bearings and solid valve lifters.

The engines were used in the Willys Jeep Station Wagon, other Jeep-based vehicles, and Willys sedans.

== L148 ==
The L148 version displaced 148.5 cubic inches (2.43 L) and was rated at 70 horsepower (52 kW; 71 PS). This was the smallest displacement six-cylinder engine when introduced in 1947 in the Willys Station Wagon. The bore was 3 inches (76 mm) and its short 3.5-inch (89 mm) stoke enabled the engine to achieve high revolutions given its flathead design.

Applications:

- 1947-1950 Willys Jeep Station Wagon
- 1948 Willys-Overland Jeepster

== L161 ==
The L161 version displaced 161 cubic inches (2.64 L) and was rated at 75 horsepower (56 kW; 76 PS). Introduced in April 1950, the engine featured a higher compression ratio of 6.9 to 1, and a larger 3.125-inch (79 mm) bore.

Applications:

- 1950-1951 Willys Jeep Station Wagon
- 1950 Willys-Overland Jeepster
- 1952-1955 Willys Aero-Lark
- 1953-1955 Willys Aero-Falcon

== Replacement ==
The F-head Hurricane engine was introduced in 1950, a significant upgrade to the Lightning. The valve configuration was changed for better power and efficiency. In 1954, the 6-226 "Super" Hurricane was introduced.
