= Willys Aero =

The Willys Aero was a line of passenger cars manufactured first by Willys-Overland and later by Kaiser-Willys Corporation from 1952 through 1955 in the United States of America. It was also produced in Brazil from 1960 to 1971.

== Production ==
=== U.S. ===
Willys Aero (USA)
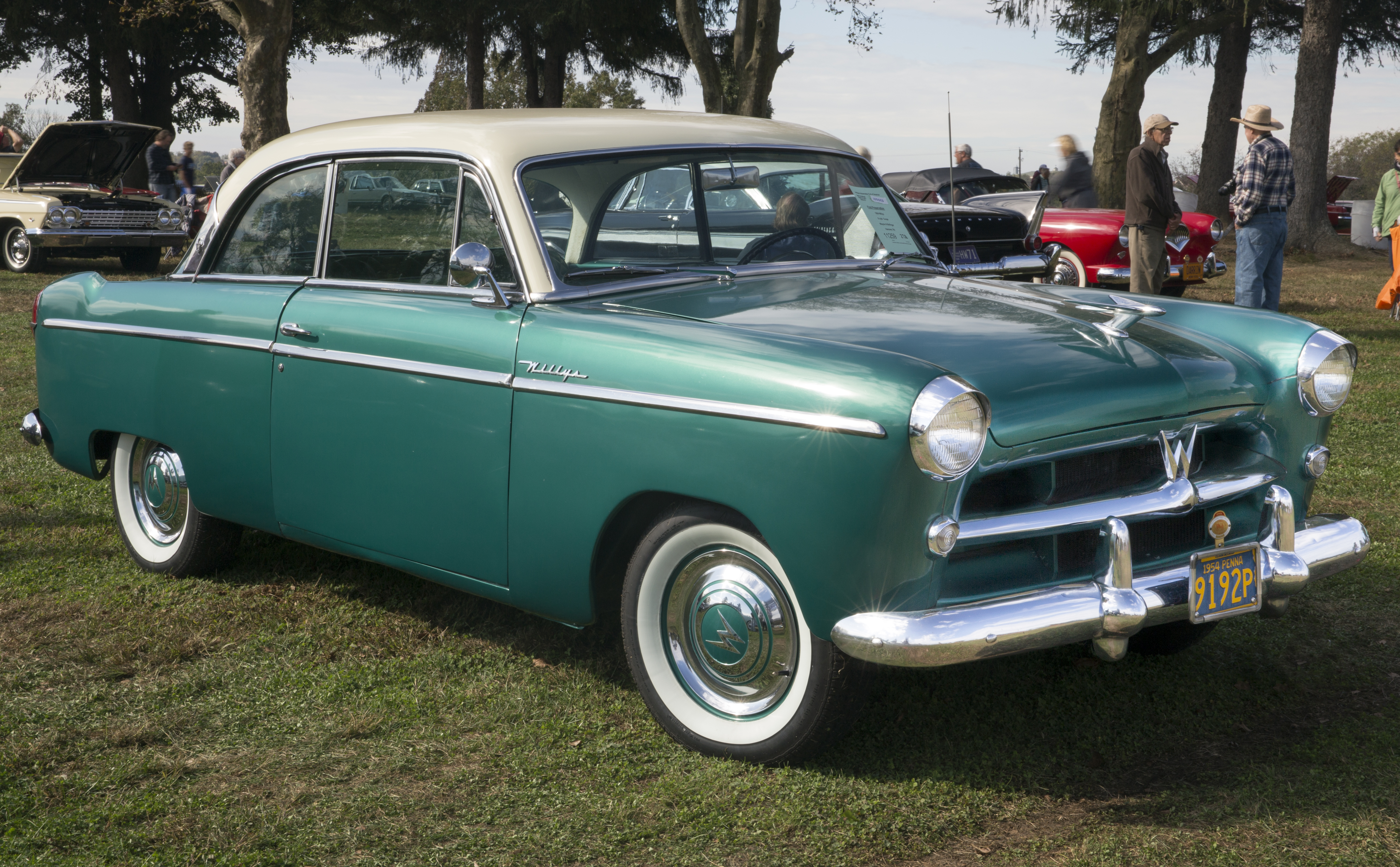
- 1954 Willys Aero Eagle 2-Door Hardtop

Overview
- Manufacturer: Willys-Overland Motors
- Production: 1952–1955
- Assembly: United States: Toledo, Ohio; Maywood, California
- Designer: Philip Wright

Body and chassis
- Class: Compact
- Body style: 2-door hardtop 2-door sedan 4-door sedan

Powertrain
- Engine: 134 cu in (2.2 L) Hurricane F-head I4; 161 cu in (2.6 L) Lightning L-head I6; 161 cu in (2.6 L) Hurricane F-head I6; 226 cu in (3.7 L) Super Hurricane L-head I6
- Transmission: 3-speed manual 3-speed manual + overdrive 4-speed Hydramatic

Dimensions
- Wheelbase: 108 in (2,743 mm)
- Length: 183 in (4,648 mm)
- Height: 60 in (1,524 mm)

The father of the Aero was Clyde Paton, former engineer for Packard Motor Car Company. The Eagle and Lark models were built from 1952 to 1954. A Wing model was available only in 1952, a Falcon model in 1953, and a taxicab in very limited production in 1953 and 1954. The Ace was the only model built through all U. S. production. 1955 saw two new models, the two- and four-door Ace sedans (renamed Custom shortly into the production run) and two-door hardtop Bermuda. Production in the U.S.A. ended that year as Henry J. Kaiser decided to give up the Kaiser and Willys Aero lines and concentrate solely on Jeeps. A total of 91,377 Aeros were built in Toledo.

Toledo-built models were available with four engine options: the F4-134 Hurricane, the L6-161 Lightning, the F6-161 Hurricane; and, after the Kaiser firm purchased the Willys firm, the L6-226 Super Hurricane from the Kaiser car line. The four-cylinder was used only in Aero Lark and was only exported.

For 1952, the model names Eagle, Wing and Ace were used for cars that had the six-cylinder F-head Hurricane engine and the Aero-Lark had the six-cylinder flathead Lightning engine. All 1952's had a two-piece split windshield. Eagles and Aces had a three-piece wraparound rear window, while the Larks and Wings had a smaller one-piece rear window.

Owners of the 1952 model tended to buy the cars for their good fuel economy. They tended to find acceleration to be 'very good', unsurprising given the cars had the best power-to-weight ratio among US production cars. The primary complaint from two-door owners was the difficulty of access to the rear seat. Many felt the cars cost too much, even if they were a bargain on performance for cost grounds. Floyd Clymer noted the car was quite capable of comfortably cruising at highway speeds of 80–90 miles per hour.

This continued for 1953 except the Wing was dropped and replaced by the Aero-Falcon, which had the six-cylinder Lightning engine. All 1953s were available as two-door or four-door sedans except the Eagle, which was a two-door hardtop. One-piece windshields were given to the Aces and the Eagles, but the Lark and Falcon retained the split windshield. Rear windows remained the same. Export Larks were available with the four-cylinder F-head engine. Dual-range Hydramatic transmissions were bought from GM and were optional in Aces and Eagles beginning in August 1953.

1954 was the most involved year when it came to models: Only the Lark, Ace and Eagle survived. There were some of each model that were re-serialed 1953s with 1954 trim hung on them and then there was the regular run in which some of the Aces and Eagles received the Kaiser Super-Hurricane engine. On the regular run, all Aeros received wraparound one piece windshields and rear windows and a new instrument panel, even the Lark. All 1954s received larger taillights, "hooded" headlight and parking light bezels, and different bumper guards. Nameplates were shuffled slightly on the regular run cars.

After 1955, the model was discontinued, although the tooling was kept in case it could be used overseas. This eventuated when production restarted in Brazil in 1960. The Brazilian government of the time had been interested in encouraging a domestic auto industry.

A 1979 newspaper article in the Toledo Blade commented on an Aero-Lark DeLuxe on a 3,500 mile tour of America, noting that it would make "a perfect 1979 model, with 108-inch wheelbase, all-welded unit body, and 28 mpg combination city and highway. And it meets present federal pollution standards without modification."

With their engine bays sized to fit the Continental straight six, the Aeros have plenty of room for small-block V8 swaps.

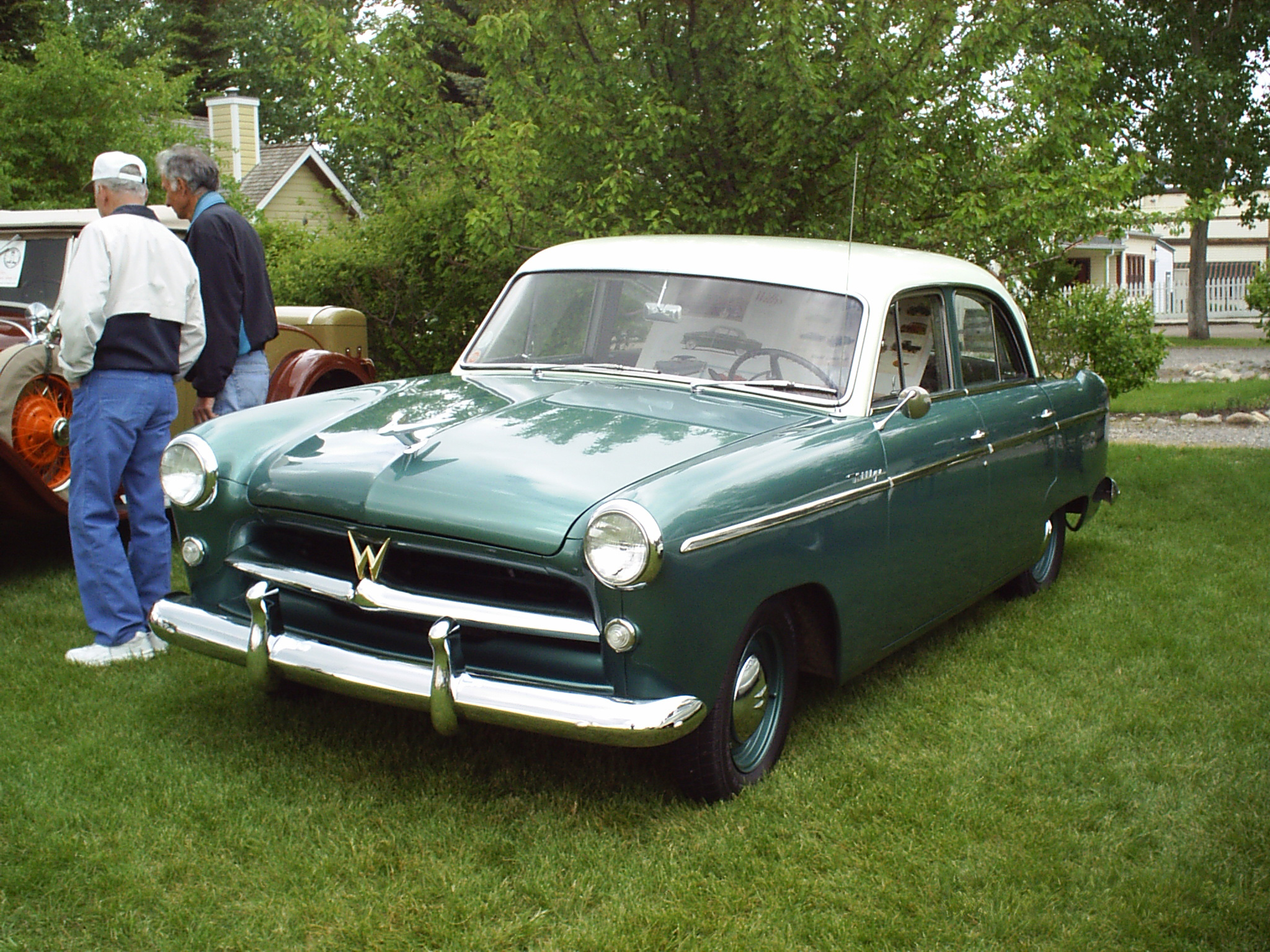
1953 Willys Aero Ace 4-Door Sedan

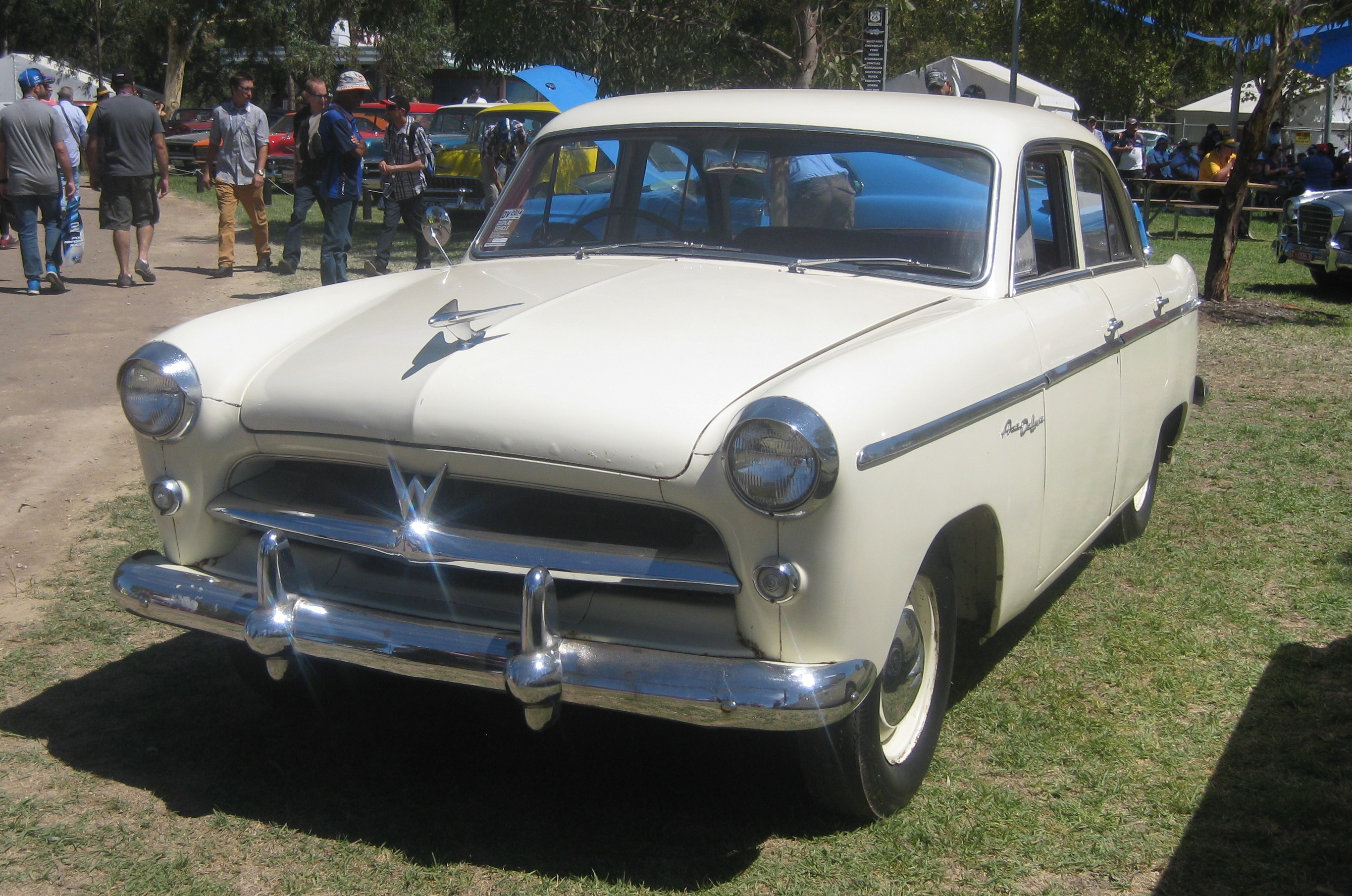
1954 Willys Aero Ace De Luxe four-door sedan

=== Brazil ===
Aero-Willys (Brazil)
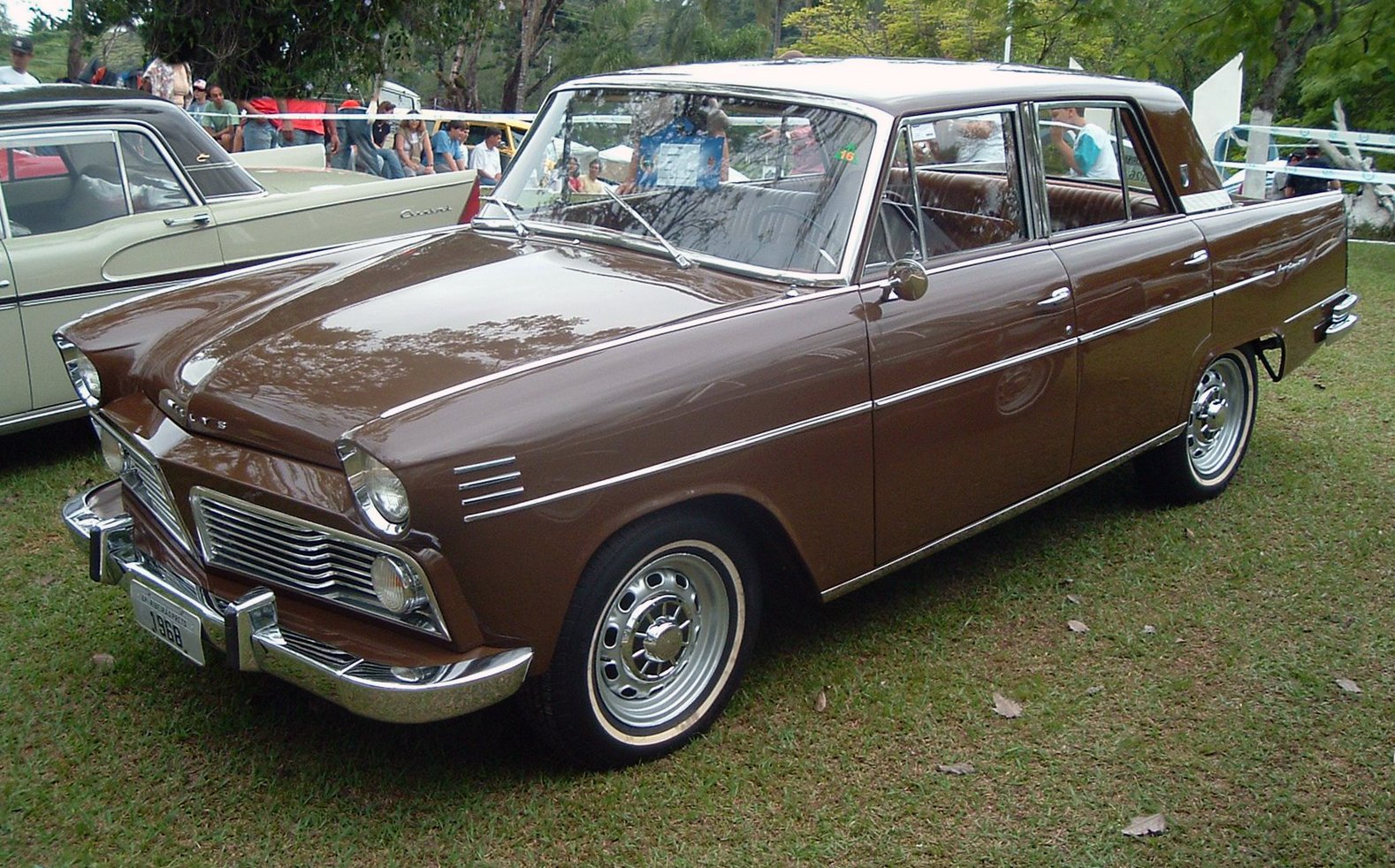
- 1968 Willys Aero 2600

Overview
- Manufacturer: Willys-Overland do Brasil S.A.
- Production: 1960–1971
- Assembly: Brazil: São Bernardo do Campo, São Paulo
- Designer: Facelifted by Brooks Stevens

Body and chassis
- Body style: 4-door sedan 4-door limousine

Powertrain
- Engine: 161 cu in (2.6 L) Hurricane I6

The Aero tooling went to Brazil where, from 1960 to 1971, the Aero, 2600, Itamaraty, and Executivo models were produced. The Willys Aero was sold through Ford do Brasil dealerships until production ceased when the US Ford Maverick replaced the Aero. 116,967 were built. Brazilian models were available only with the F6-161, available in 90, 110, and 132 hp variants.

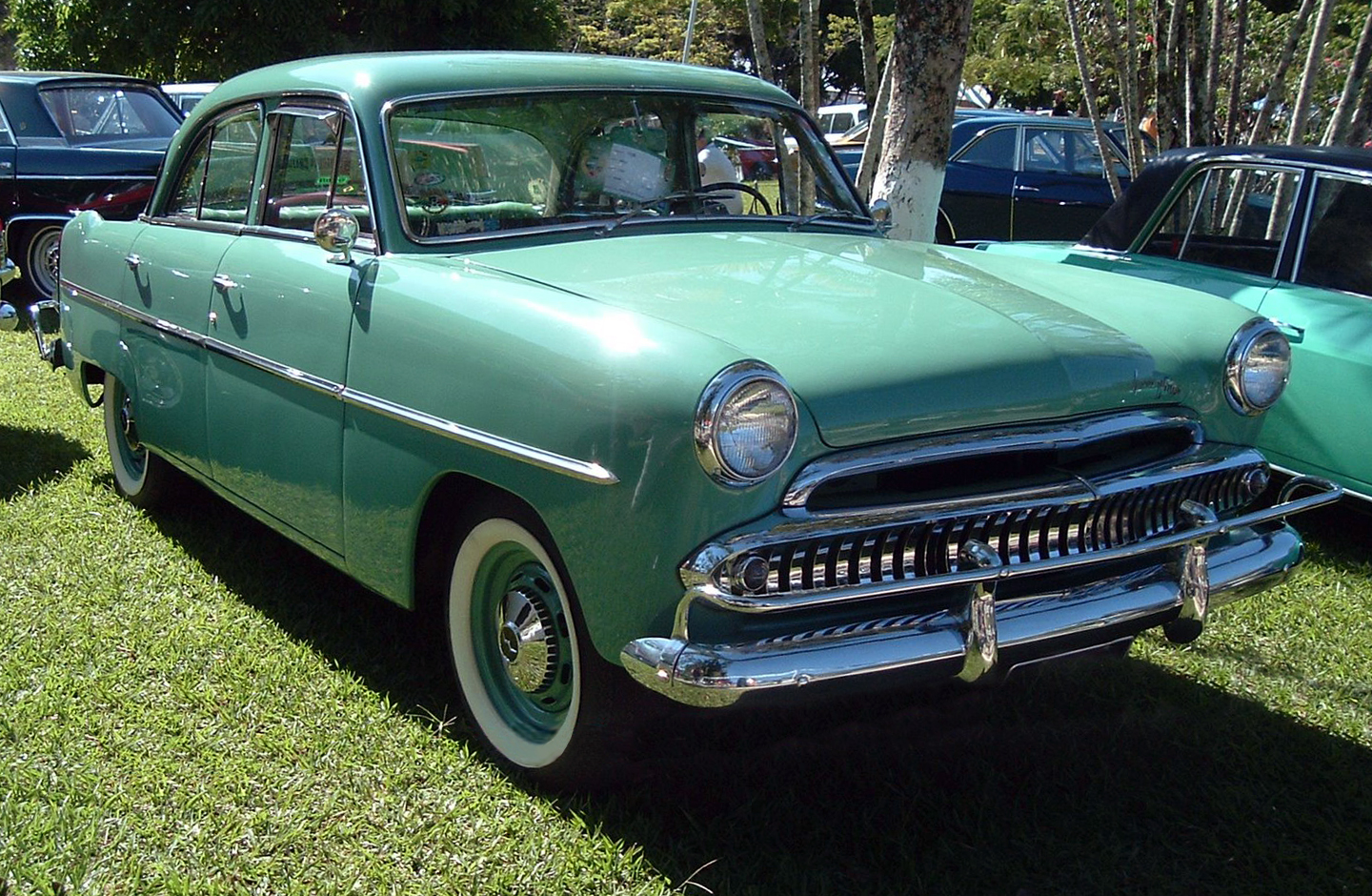
1960–1962 Aero Willys

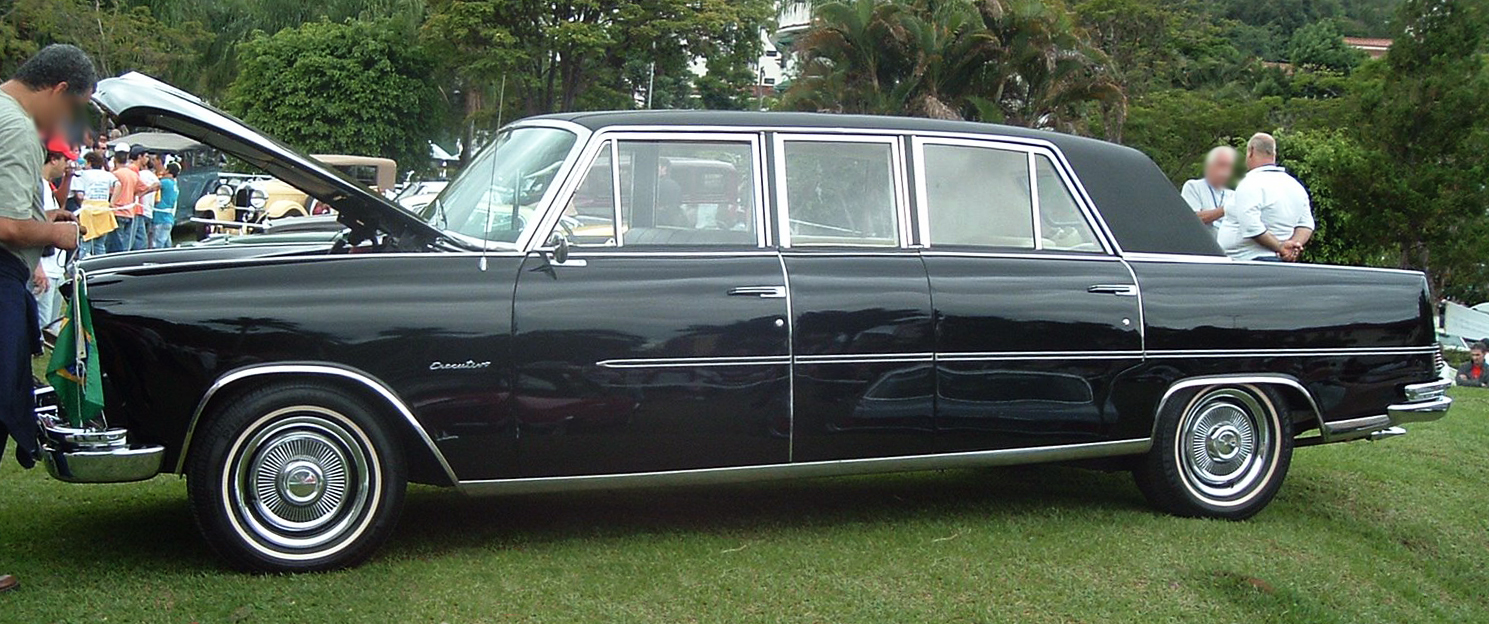
1967 Aero Willys Itamaraty limousine (side view)

== See also ==
- Henry J
