= Willys Hurricane engine =

Willys Hurricane
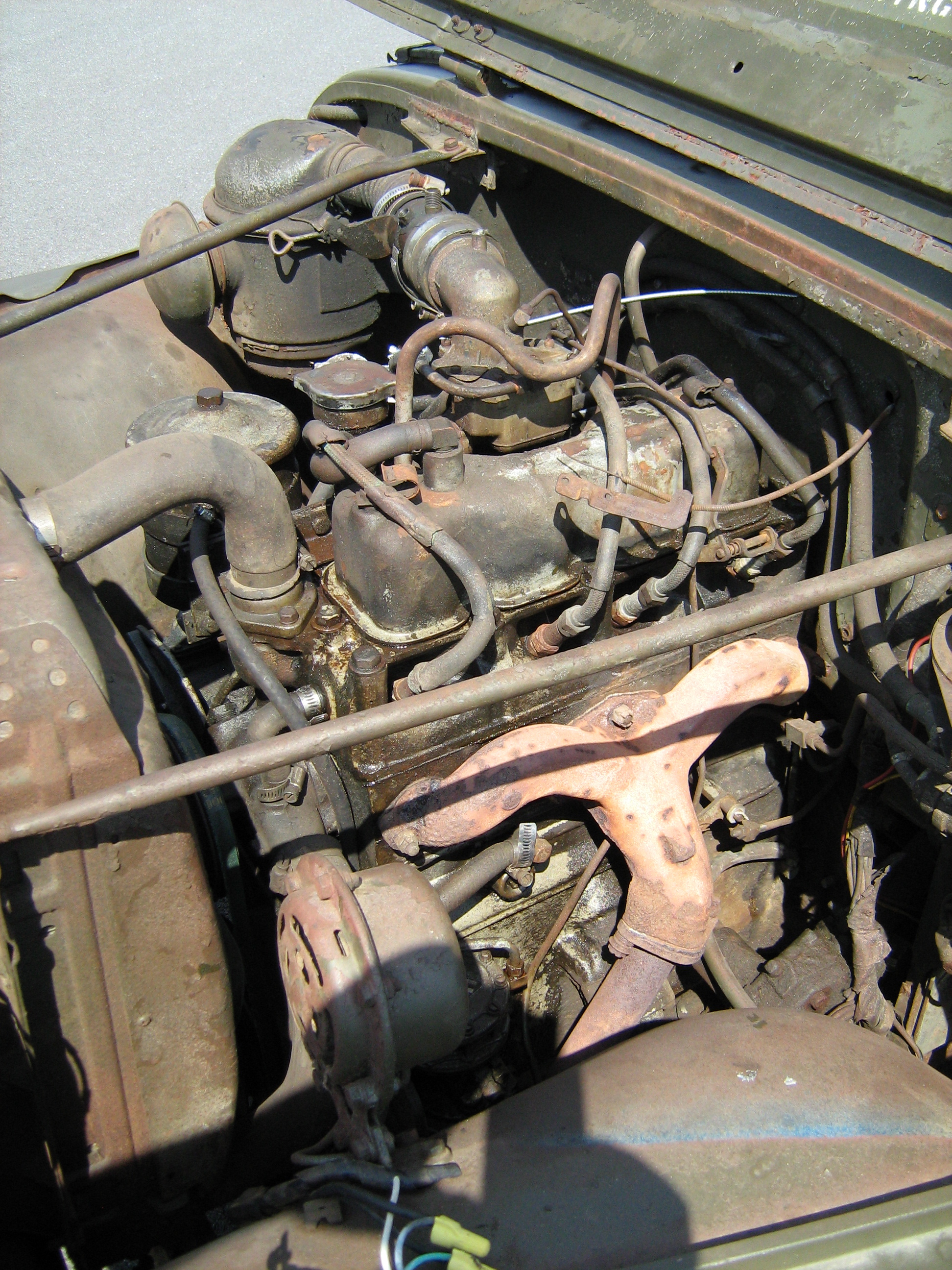

Overview
- Manufacturer: Willys; Kaiser-Jeep; American Motors (AMC)
- Also called: F-134; F-161; Mitsubishi JH4, KE31, KE36
- Production: 1950–1971

Layout
- Configuration: F-head Straight-4 and Straight-6
- Cylinder block material: Cast Iron
- Cylinder head material: Cast Iron
- Valvetrain: IOE

Dimensions
- Dry weight: 470 lb (213 kg)

Chronology
- Predecessor: Willys Go-Devil; Willys Lightning
- Successor: Jeep Tornado engine

The Willys F4-134 Hurricane was an inline-4 F-head piston engine that powered the M38A1 military Jeep in 1952, followed by the famous Jeep CJ in the CJ-3B, CJ-5, and CJ-6 models. It was also used in the Willys 473 and 475 pickups, wagons, and sedan deliveries. It replaced the Willys Go Devil engine that was used in the MB Jeep and other early Jeep-based models like the Jeepster. This engine was also built by Mitsubishi for their license-built Jeep, for other applications.

== Design ==
The Hurricane was based on the earlier Go-Devil flathead engine. To enhance power from the engine, the induction system was changed from the Go-Devil's side-valve configuration to an inlet-over-exhaust configuration, or "F-head". This allowed the valves to be larger and the combustion chamber to be smaller, improving flow and increasing the compression ratio. The compression ratio rose from 6.5:1 in the Go-Devil engine to 7.5:1 in the Hurricane engine, although a version of the Hurricane engine was made with a 6.9:1 compression ratio.

== F134 ==
The L134 Go Devil was updated with the F-head to become the F134 in 1950. This engine produced a gross output of 75 hp (56 kW; 76 PS) at 4000 rpm and 114 lb⋅ft (155 N⋅m) of torque at 2000 rpm with a 7.5:1 compression ratio. The gross power and torque outputs decreased to 72 hp (54 kW; 73 PS) and 112 lb⋅ft (152 N⋅m), respectively, when the engine had a 6.9:1 compression ratio. Bore and stroke dimensions were the same as the L-head engine at 3 1/8 x 4 3/8 inches, giving 134.2 cu in (2,199 cc).

The F4-134 was introduced in 1950 in the Jeep Truck. Willys vehicles with this engine were designated 4-73 model. This engine was unavailable in the CJ series until the introduction of the CJ-3B version in 1953, which had a distinctive high hood to accommodate the much taller engine. Production of this engine continued through 1971, which was after American Motors Corporation (AMC) purchased Kaiser Jeep in 1970.

Applications:

- 1950–1961 Willys Jeep Truck
- 1950–1961 Willys Jeep Wagon
- 1950 Willys-Overland Jeepster
- 1952–1971 Willys M38A1
- 1953 Willys 475A Lark
- 1953–1968 Willys CJ-3B
- 1955–1971 CJ-5
- 1956–1971 CJ-6
- 1965-1967 DJ-5
- 1966–1971 Jeepster Commando

== F161 ==
The F6-161 Hurricane is an F-head version of the L6-161 Lightning flathead straight six. It was available in the Model 685 Station Wagon.

BF-161 The BF-161 has a 3 1/8 inch bore and a 3 1/2 inch stroke, a one-barrel carburetor, and an output of 90 hp (67 kW; 91 PS) at 4400 rpm and 135 lb⋅ft (183 N⋅m) of torque at 2000 rpm. Its 161.1 cu in (2,640 cc) displacement features a compression ratio of 7.6:1.

2600 The 2600 was the same BF-161 engine made in Brazil by Willys-Overland's subsidiary, but it had two one-barrel carburetors (simultaneously opened) and had an output of 130 hp (97 kW; 132 PS) at 4400 rpm and 140 lb⋅ft (190 N⋅m) of torque at 2000 rpm. The compression ratio remained 7.6:1.

3000 The 3 L version is almost identical to the BF-161 engine, with the stroke increased to 4 inches (101.6 mm), giving it a displacement of 3,016.5 cc (184.1 cu in). With a two-barrel carburetor, it produced 140 hp (104 kW; 142 PS) at 4400 rpm and 161 lb⋅ft (218 N⋅m) of torque at 2000 rpm. It also had a slightly higher compression ratio of 8:1. It initially used a different head with a removable intake manifold.

After Ford acquired Willys-Overland do Brasil, they reverted the engine to its former head design with an integral intake manifold. Ford also improved the cooling between cylinders 5 and 6 as well as incorporating a side-mounted oil filter instead of the front-mounted, hose-connected system designed by Willys.

Applications:

- 1951–1952 Willys Aero
- 1960–1971 Willys Aero 2600
- 1960-1974 Willys-Overland Jeep and Rural Willys
- 1968–1971 Willys Itamaraty 3000
- 1972-1974 Ford Maverick six-cylinder version in Brazil

== Super Hurricane ==
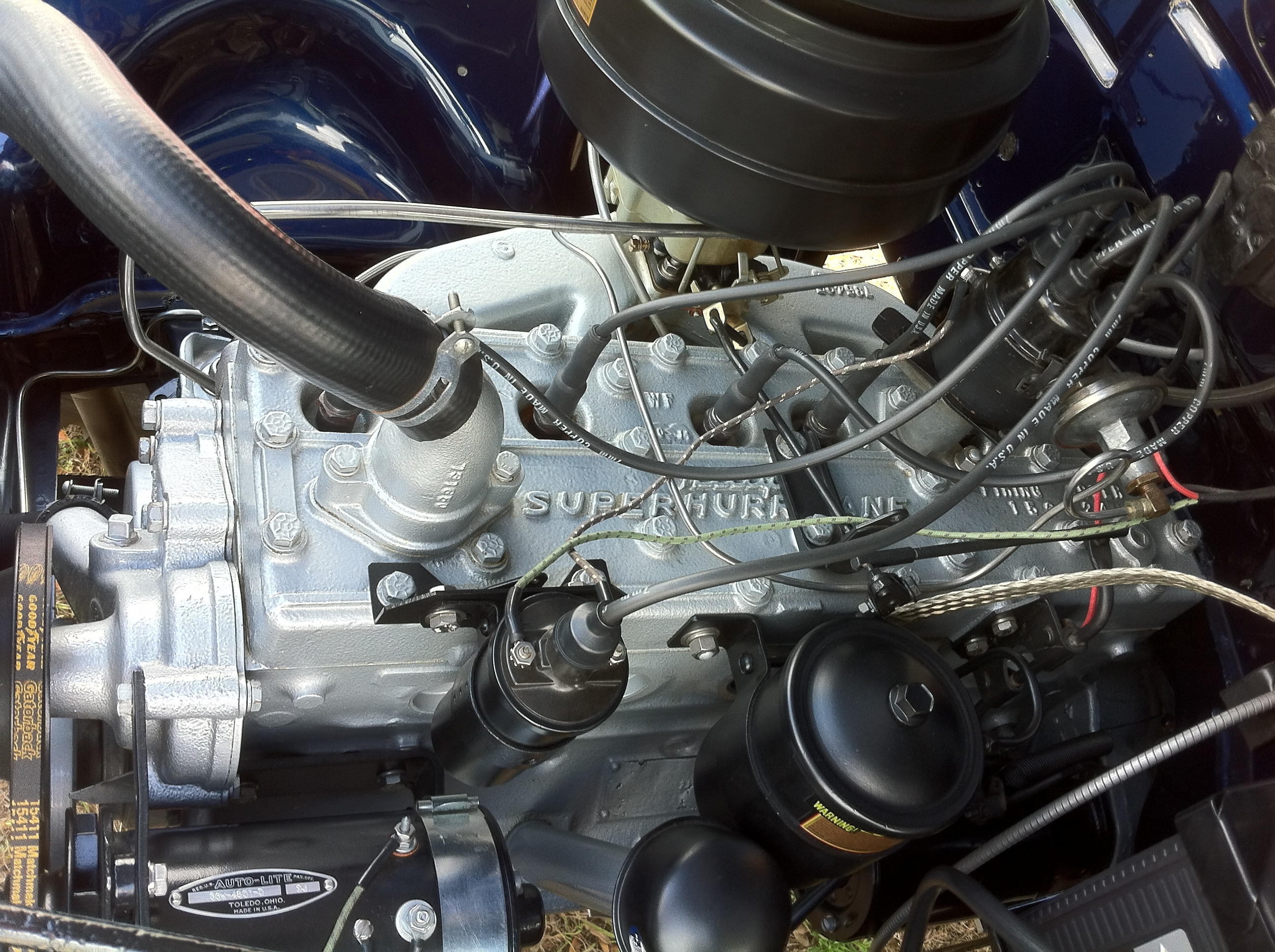
Super Hurricane engine in 1955 Jeep Willys Utility Wagon

The 6-226 "Super Hurricane" was an L-head 6-cylinder from Continental with a bore of 3 5/16 inches and stroke of 4 3/8 inches, giving a displacement of 226.2 cu in (3,707 cc). Horsepower rating is 105 hp (78 kW; 106 PS) at 3600 rpm or 115 hp (86 kW; 117 PS) at 3650 rpm, as well as a torque rating of 190 lb⋅ft (258 N⋅m) at 1400 rpm or at 1800 rpm, depending on the year of production.

== Mitsubishi versions ==
Mitsubishi built a version of the Hurricane from 1954 as the JH4 (69 hp), primarily for use in their license-built version of the Jeep. They later developed a 61 PS (45 kW) overhead-valve diesel version of the same, called KE31. This was also turned into a 3.3 L six-cylinder version with the same internal dimensions, producing 85 PS (63 kW), which was named KE36. These diesel engines were used in the Jeep, but also in many light to medium-weight trucks and buses.

== Stellantis engine ==
The 3.0-liter inline-6, called Hurricane turbo engine, developed in 2022 for use in Ram, Jeep, and Dodge vehicles, is unrelated to the original Willys Hurricane versions.
