= Willys Go Devil engine =

Go Devil
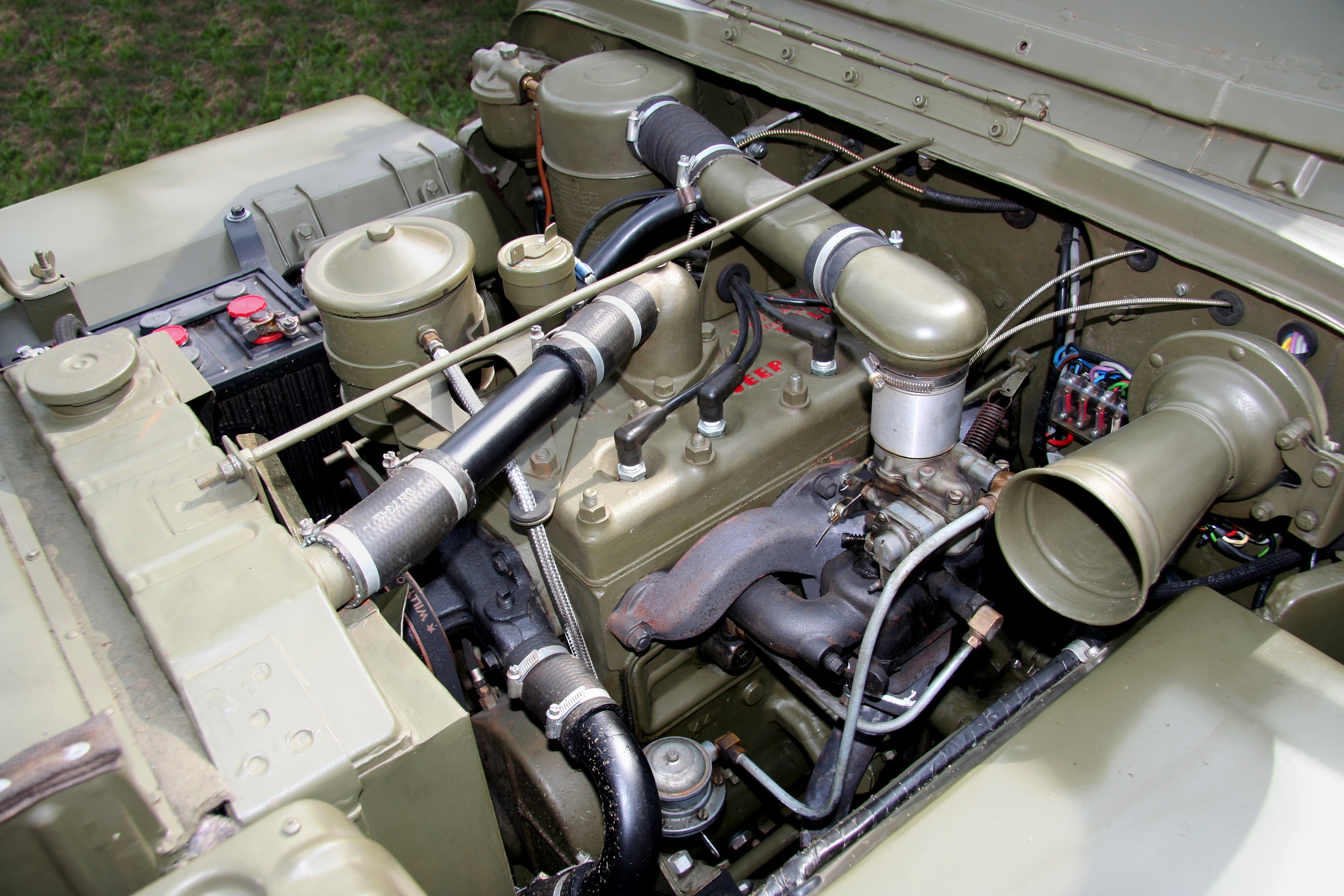

Overview
- Manufacturer: Willys-Overland

Layout
- Configuration: Straight-4
- Displacement: 134.2 cu in (2.199 L)
- Cylinder bore: 3.125 in (79.4 mm)
- Piston stroke: 4.375 in (111.1 mm)
- Cylinder block material: Iron
- Cylinder head material: Iron
- Valvetrain: L-head
- Compression ratio: 6.48:1

Combustion
- Fuel system: 1-barrel carburetor
- Fuel type: Gasoline
- Cooling system: Water-cooled

Output
- Power output: 60 hp (45 kW; 61 PS)
- Specific power: 0.42 hp/CID
- Torque output: 105 lb⋅ft (142 N⋅m)

Chronology
- Successor: Willys Hurricane engine

The Willys L134 (nicknamed Go Devil) is a straight-4 flathead automobile engine that was made famous in the Willys MB and Ford GPW Jeep produced during World War II. It powered nearly all the Jeep vehicles built for the U.S. and Allies. It was later used in a variety of civilian Jeep vehicles.

== History ==
In 1940, the Willys Quad was built to compete against the Bantam reconnaissance car for evaluation by the U.S. Army. The two prototype Quads were powered by the Willys “Go-Devil” engine that turned out to be the automaker's greatest asset. Willys' pilot vehicle was overweight compared to the Army's requirements, but the "Go Devil" engine rated at 55 hp (41 kW; 56 PS) included a heavier transmission, a combination that proved to be beneficial in the long-run for use in cross-country travel.

The engine was developed by Willys' Chief Engineer, Delmar "Barney" Roos, and was the most powerful of the three prototype vehicles evaluated by the U.S. Army for production. Roos took the "less than impressive" 48 hp (36 kW; 49 PS) automobile engine and increased its performance and durability. The specifications by the Quartermaster Corps called for only 85 lb⋅ft (115 N⋅m) of torque at the rear axle. The extra power made it the engine of choice for the U.S. Army.

The engine displacement was 134.2 cu in (2,199 cc) with a 3.125 in (79.4 mm) bore and 4.375 in (111.1 mm) stroke, a very undersquare design. It was an L-head design, with valves parallel with the cylinders. Initial power output was 60 hp (45 kW; 61 PS) at 4000 rpm and 105 lb⋅ft (142 N⋅m) of torque at 2000 rpm with 6.48:1 compression.

The L134 was phased out by the F-head Willys Hurricane engine beginning in 1950.

== Applications ==
- 1937–1942 Willys Americar
- 1941–1945 Willys MB
- 1941–1945 Ford GPW
- 1944–1945 Willys-Overland CJ-2
- 1945–1949 Willys-Overland CJ-2A
- 1946–1950 Willys Jeep Station Wagon in which it was rated at 63 hp (47 kW; 64 PS)
- 1949–1953 Willys-Overland CJ-3A
- 1948–1950 Willys-Overland Jeepster
- 1950–1952 Willys M38
- 1950–1954 Henry J
- 1952–1954 IAME Rastrojero
- 1956–1965 Willys DJ-3a
- 1956–1965 Hotchkiss M201 (Willys MB produced under licence in France)
