= Jeepster Commando =

Compact vehicle produced by Kaiser and American Motors

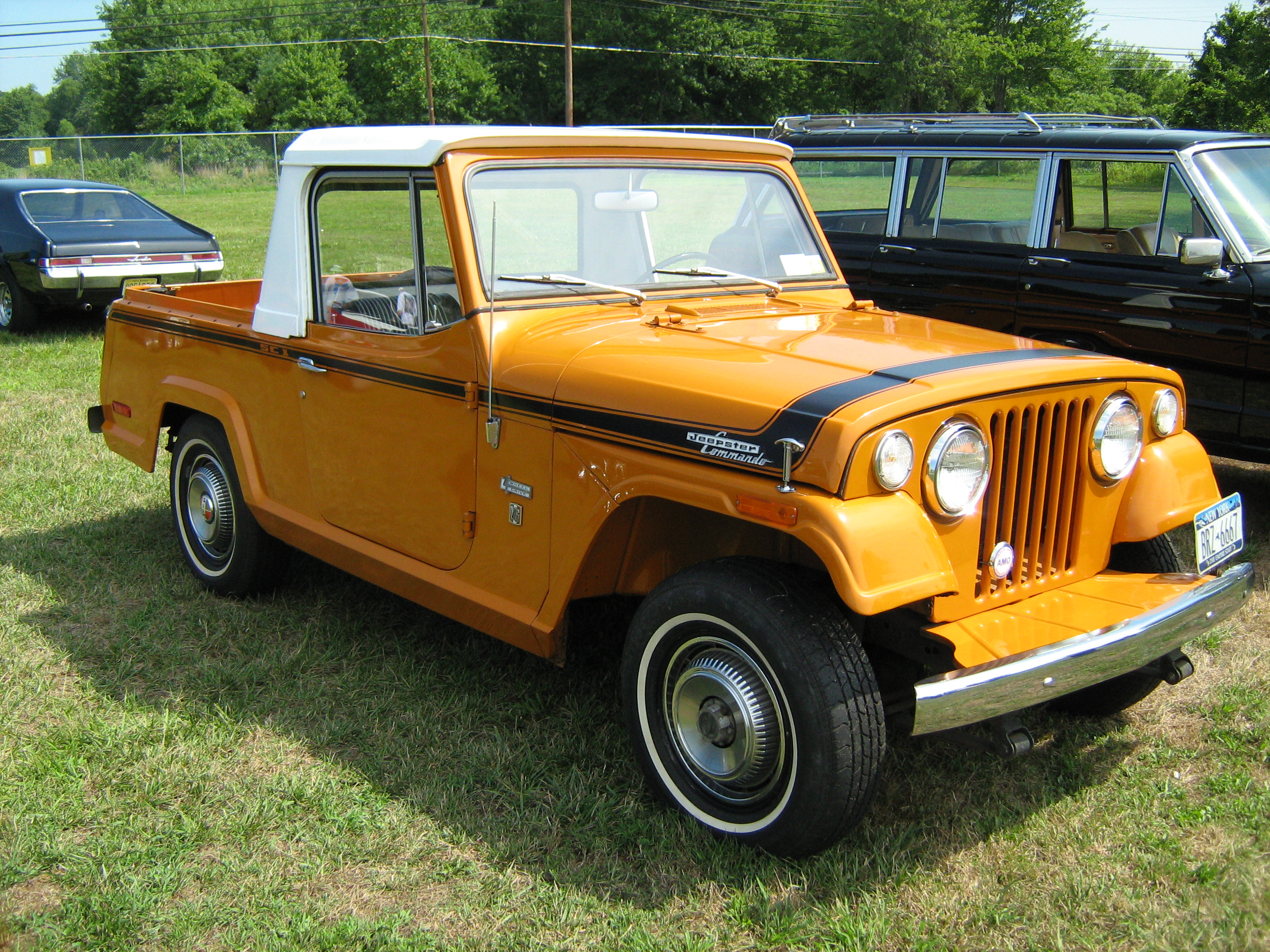
- 1971 Jeepster Commando SC-1

Overview
- Manufacturer: Kaiser Jeep (1966–1970); American Motors Corporation (1970–1973)
- Also called: Jeep Commando
- Production: 1966–1973
- Model years: 1967–1973
- Assembly: United States: Toledo, Ohio (Toledo Complex); Spain: Zaragoza (VIASA)

Body and chassis
- Class: SUV
- Body style: 2-door convertible pickup

Dimensions
- Wheelbase: 101 in (2,565 mm) (1966–1971); 104 in (2,642 mm) (1972–1973)

Chronology
- Predecessor: Willys-Overland Jeepster
- Successor: Jeep Cherokee; Jeep CJ-8 (Scrambler) (For pickup truck version)

The Jeepster Commando is a compact-sized recreational vehicle produced by Kaiser Jeep from 1966 until 1970 and American Motors Corporation (AMC) from 1970 through 1973. It followed the concept of the original 1948 through 1951 Willys-Overland Jeepster. The new Jeepster Commando was available in several body styles, including pickup truck, convertible, roadster, and two-door wagon.

Following the acquisition of Jeep by American Motors Corporation (AMC) in 1970, the vehicle underwent a redesign for the 1972 model year, featuring new front-end styling, longer wheelbase, and AMC engines, and was renamed the Jeep Commando.

The model was discontinued after the 1973 model year and replaced by the full-size Jeep Cherokee (SJ).

== C101 (1966–1971) ==
Kaiser Jeep revived the Jeepster nameplate, introducing the Jeepster Commando (C101) in January 1967. The company had limited resources to design an all-new vehicle given the small market segment at that time. Kaiser was able to develop the new model by revising some of the tooling from the 1948 through 1951 Willys-Overland Jeepster and using the 101 in (2,565 mm) wheelbase chassis from the CJ-6. This iteration was designed to compete in the burgeoning recreational vehicle market that now included the International Scout and Ford Bronco.

The C101 was initially powered by the F-head 134 cu in (2.2 L) "Hurricane" I4 engine, a descendant of the original "Go Devil engine" used in World War II Jeeps. An optional 225 cu in (3.7 L) "Dauntless" V6 engine was also available and proved popular. Four-wheel drive was a standard feature, enhancing the vehicle's off-road capabilities.

The C101 was offered in various body styles, including a station wagon with a full-length metal hardtop, a convertible with a soft top, a pickup truck, and a roadster with optional half- or full-length soft tops. The deluxe station wagon model featured sliding rear windows, full interior trim, and optional two-tone exterior paint. Three trim levels were offered: the "Jeepster" (also referred to as "Revival Jeepster" or "Jeepster Convertible"), the "Commando Convertible," and the open-body roadster. The "Jeepster" was the flagship model, featuring deluxe interior appointments, a powered convertible top, and an optional Continental tire kit. The "Commando Convertible" offered the same body style with more basic equipment.

Following the acquisition of the Jeep brand in 1970 by American Motors Corporation (AMC), the Commando continued production.

Engines:

- 1966–1971: F134 Hurricane I4 134 cu in (2.2 L), 75 hp (56 kW; 76 PS) at 4000 rpm and 114 lb⋅ft (155 N⋅m) of torque at 2000 rpm.
- 1966–1971: Dauntless 225 V6 225 cu in (3.7 L), 3.75 in (95 mm) bore, 3.40 in (86 mm) stroke, 160 hp (119 kW; 162 PS) and 235 lb⋅ft (319 N⋅m)

=== Hurst Jeepster ===
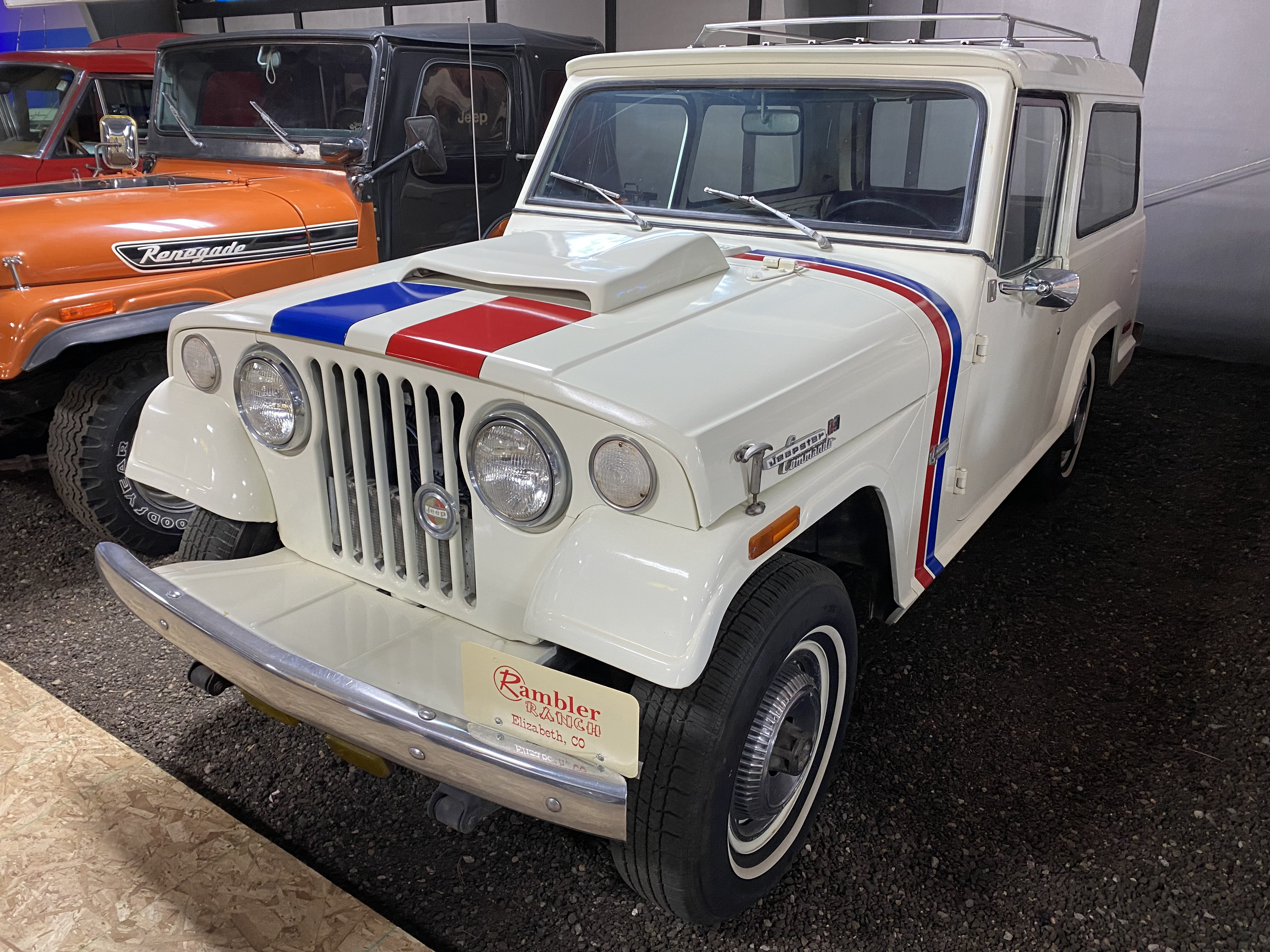
Original 1971 Hurst Jeepster at Rambler Ranch

A notable variant is the 1971 Hurst Jeepster, a limited-edition model produced by AMC in collaboration with Hurst Performance. It featured a Champagne White exterior with distinctive red and blue stripes, a roof rack, a sports steering wheel, and Goodyear G70x15 raised white letter tires on wider steel wheels. Hurst modifications included special exterior badging, an 8,000-rpm tachometer mounted on the hood scoop, and a Hurst T-handle shifter for manual transmission models or a console-mounted Hurst Dual-Gate shifter for automatic transmission models.

The Hurst Jeepster included many muscle car styling cues and while the appearance and Hurst name promised performance, the model was a C101 with the 225 cu in (3.7 L) V6 engine with two-barrel carburetor. It is estimated that 100 were produced and was the last vehicle with Hurst/AMC collaboration. The Hurst Jeepster is now considered one of the rarest production Jeeps.

Production by year
Year	C101 Jeepster
1966	2,345
1967	12,621
1968	13,924
1969	11,289
1970	9,268
1971	7,903
Total	57,350

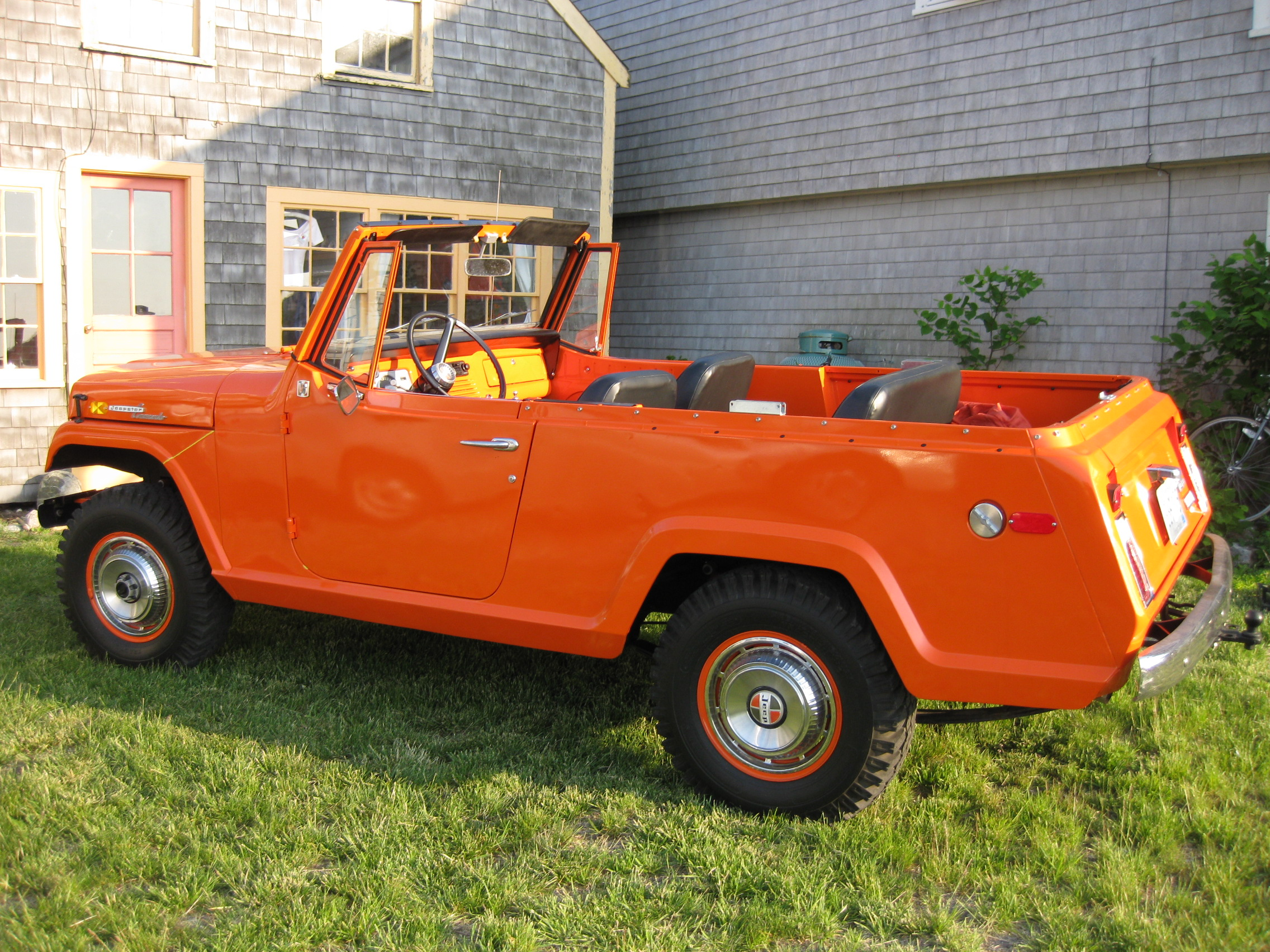
1970 Jeepster Commando

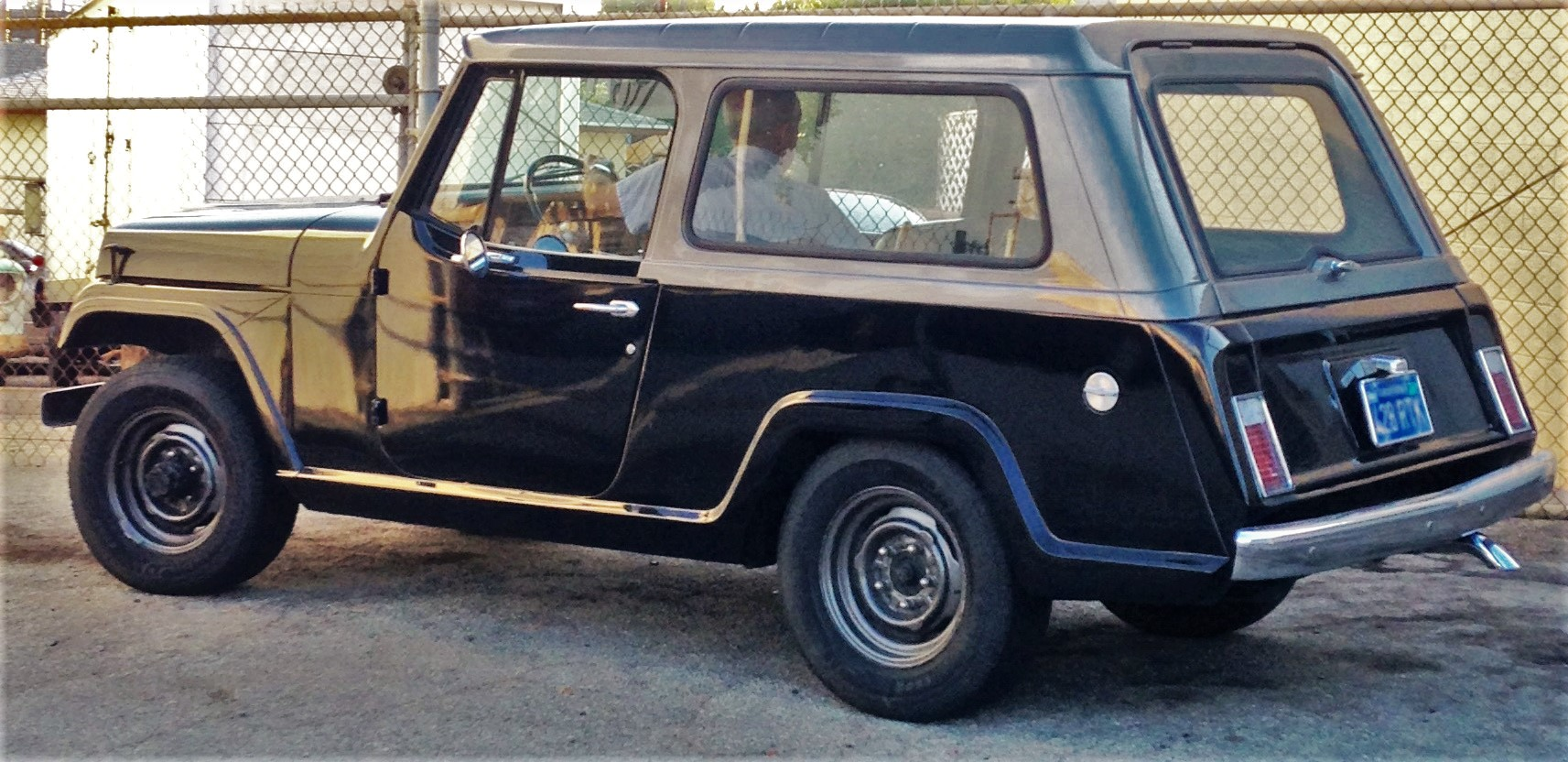
Jeepster Commando hardtop

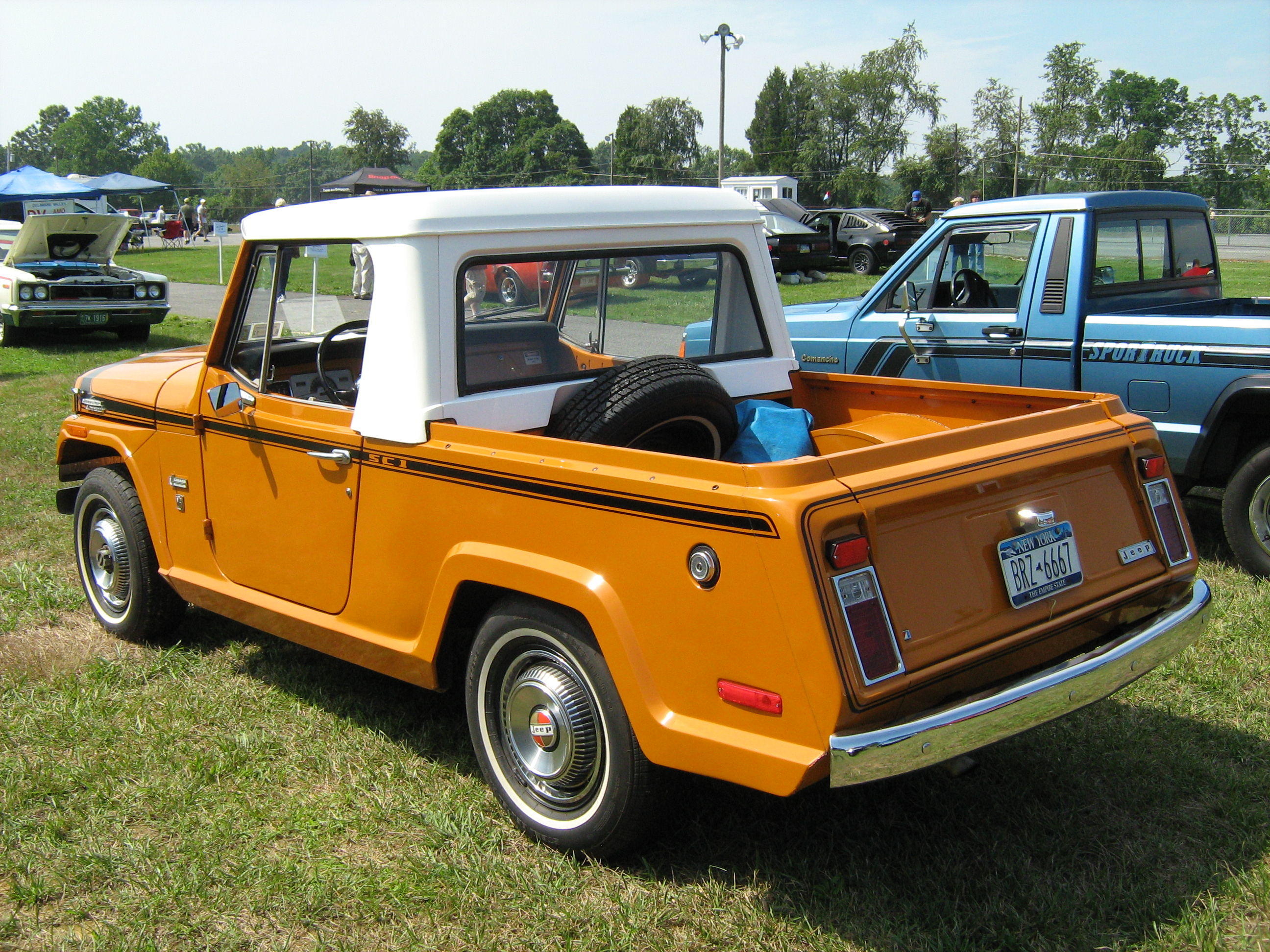
1971 Jeepster Commando SC-1 pickup

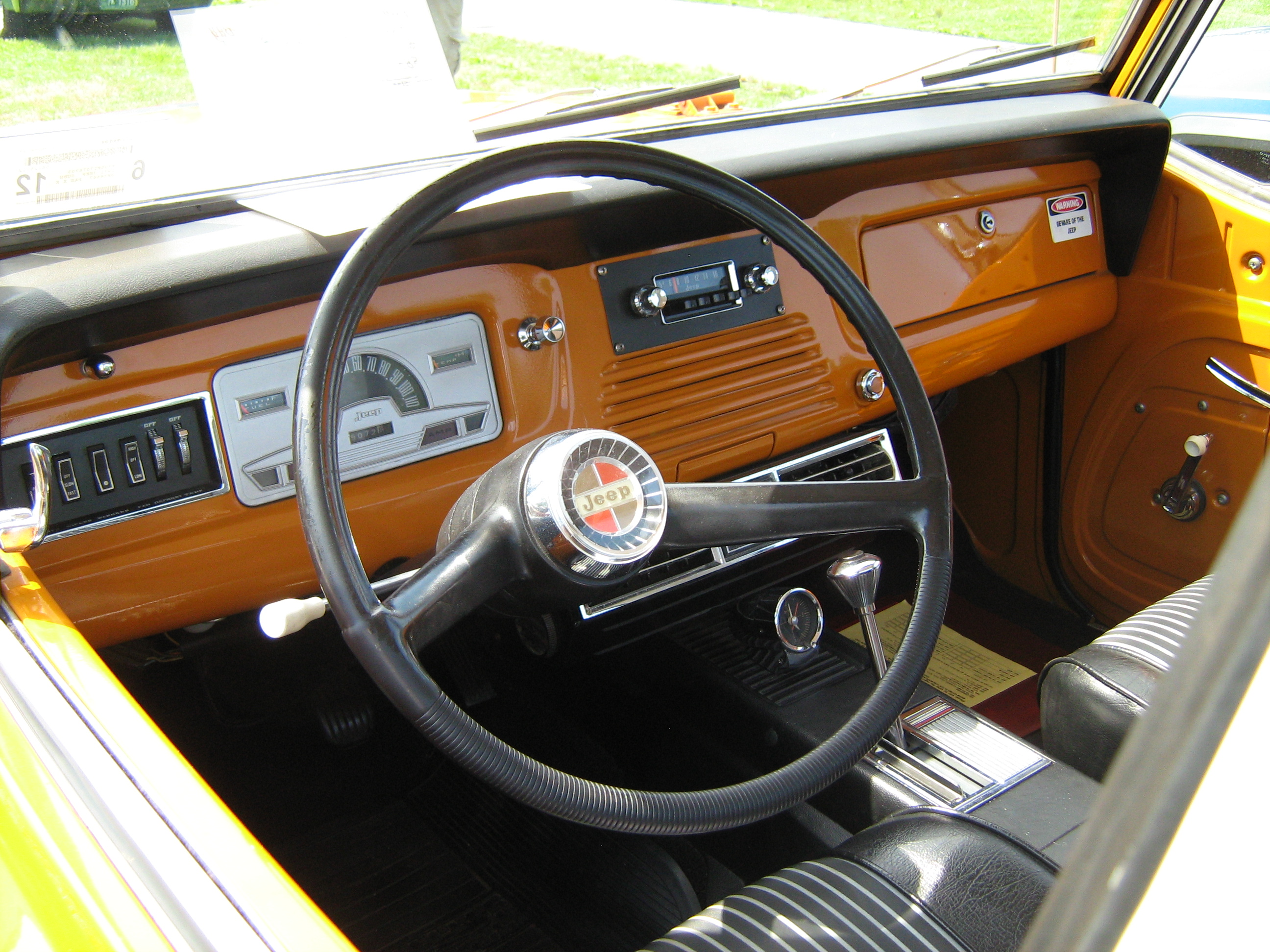
1971 Jeepster Commando interior

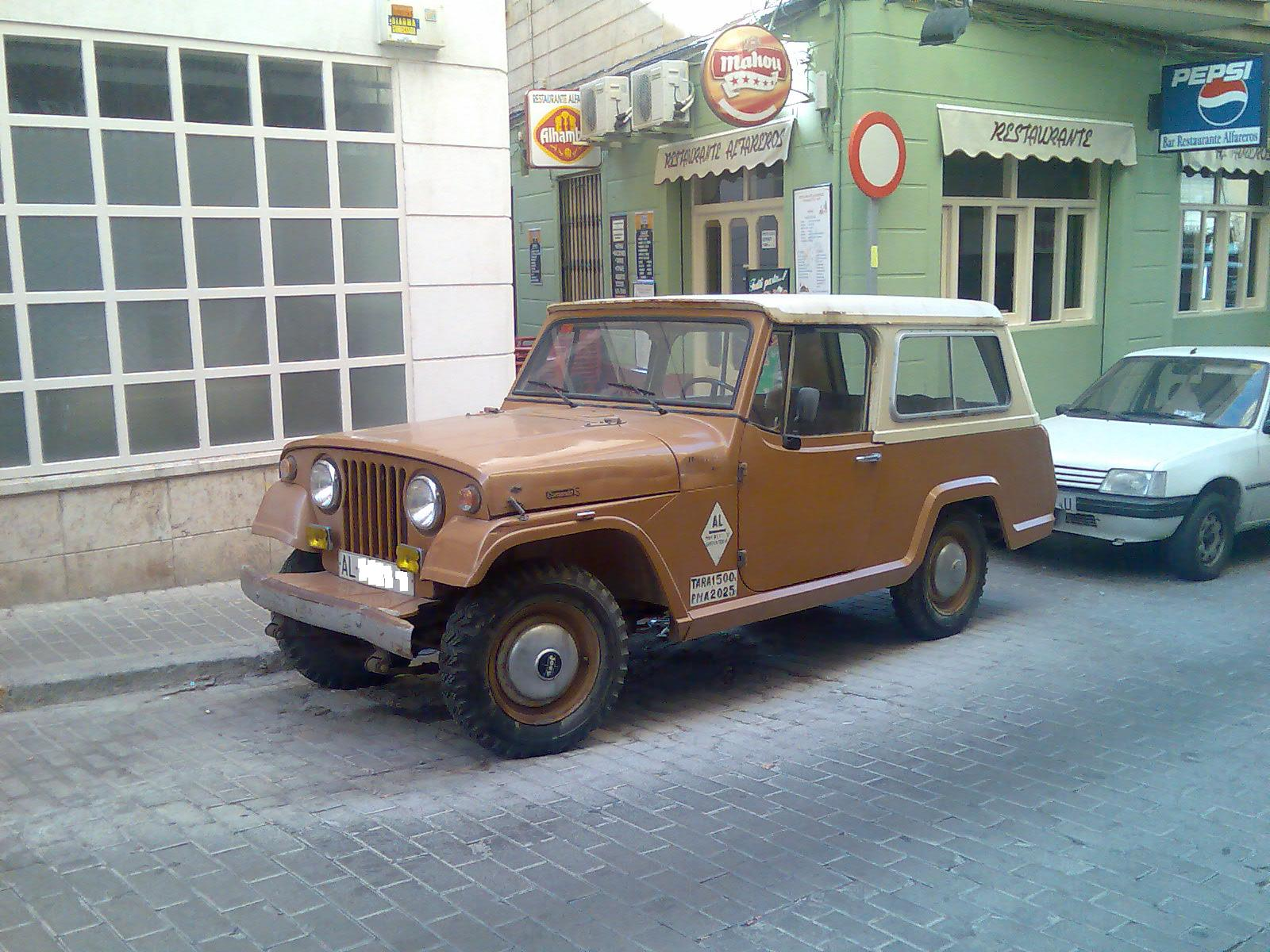
Jeep-Ebro Commando (Spain)

== C104 (1972–1973) ==
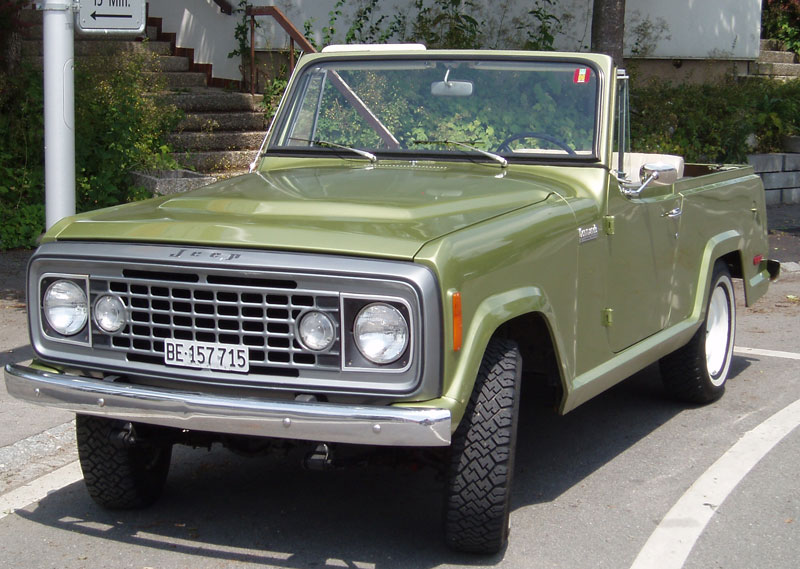
1972 Jeep Commando (C104)

The 1972 and 1973 model years represent the second generation of the Jeep Commando, known internally as the C104. The new version was a significant departure from the previous C101 due to the changes implemented after AMC acquired Jeep in 1970.

The "Jeepster" part of the name was removed; it was now called the Jeep Commando. Most noticeable was a new front end that departed from the traditional Jeep grille. The Commando now features a "conventional" full-width egg crate-type grille that mimicked that of the larger Chevrolet K5 Blazer. This redesign has described as the most uncharacteristic of what was expected of Jeep styling.

The more substantial front end was one of the many upgrades to accommodate the longer and more powerful AMC engines. Replacing the I4 and V6 were 232 cu in (3.8 L) or 258 cu in (4.2 L) AMC Straight-6 or the 304 cu in (5.0 L) AMC V8 engine. The wheelbase was also extended to 104 in (2,642 mm) to fit the new engines and this helped to improved the ride and increase legroom. Four-wheel-drive with a two-speed transfer case remained standard features, emphasizing the Commando's off-road heritage and capability.

Other enhancements included wider tread and a stronger frame. The rear flanged-shaft rear axle was strengthened along with an increased capacity open-end front axle and ball-joint ends. The turning diameter was shortened with new steering box and linkage also reduced steering effort. A new rear-mounted gas tank provided an additional 5 US gallons (18.9 litres) capacity to 16.5 US gallons (62.5 litres). Along with the bigger engines, the 1972 Commando featured larger drum brakes.

The 1973 models were essentially unchanged except for including larger-sized tires as standard equipment.

Engines:

- 1971–1972: AMC 232 I6— 232 cu in (3.8 L), 3.750 in (95.3 mm) bore, 3.500 in (88.9 mm) stroke, 100 hp (75 kW; 101 PS) and 185 lb⋅ft (251 N⋅m)
- 1971–1972: AMC 258 I6—258 cu in (4.2 L), 3.750 in (95.3 mm) bore, 3.895 in (98.9 mm) stroke
- 1971–1973: AMC–304 V8—304 cu in (5.0 L), 3.750 in (95.3 mm) bore, 3.753 in (95.3 mm) stroke 1971: 210 hp (157 kW; 213 PS), 1972: 150 hp (112 kW; 152 PS)

Production by year
Year	C104 Commando
1972	10,685
1973	9,538
Total	20,223

== Legacy ==
The Jeepster Commando is significant in Jeep's history despite its relatively short production run. It bridged the gap between the early military-derived Jeeps and the later, more refined recreational vehicles now called SUVs. The Commando also offered diverse body styles and off-road capabilities contributing to the evolution of the Jeep brand and wide variety of models. By the 1970s, the market had shifted to larger-sized four-wheel-drive vehicles. The compact Commando was discontinued and replaced by the full-size Jeep Cherokee (SJ) (a two-door version of the Wagoneer) introduced for the 1974 model year. The longer wheelbase CJ-7 was introduced to fill the compact market segment occupied by the Commando as well as the Scrambler CJ-8 with a 103.5 in (2,629 mm) wheelbase.
