= Willys-Overland Jeepster =

Motor vehicle model made by Jeep

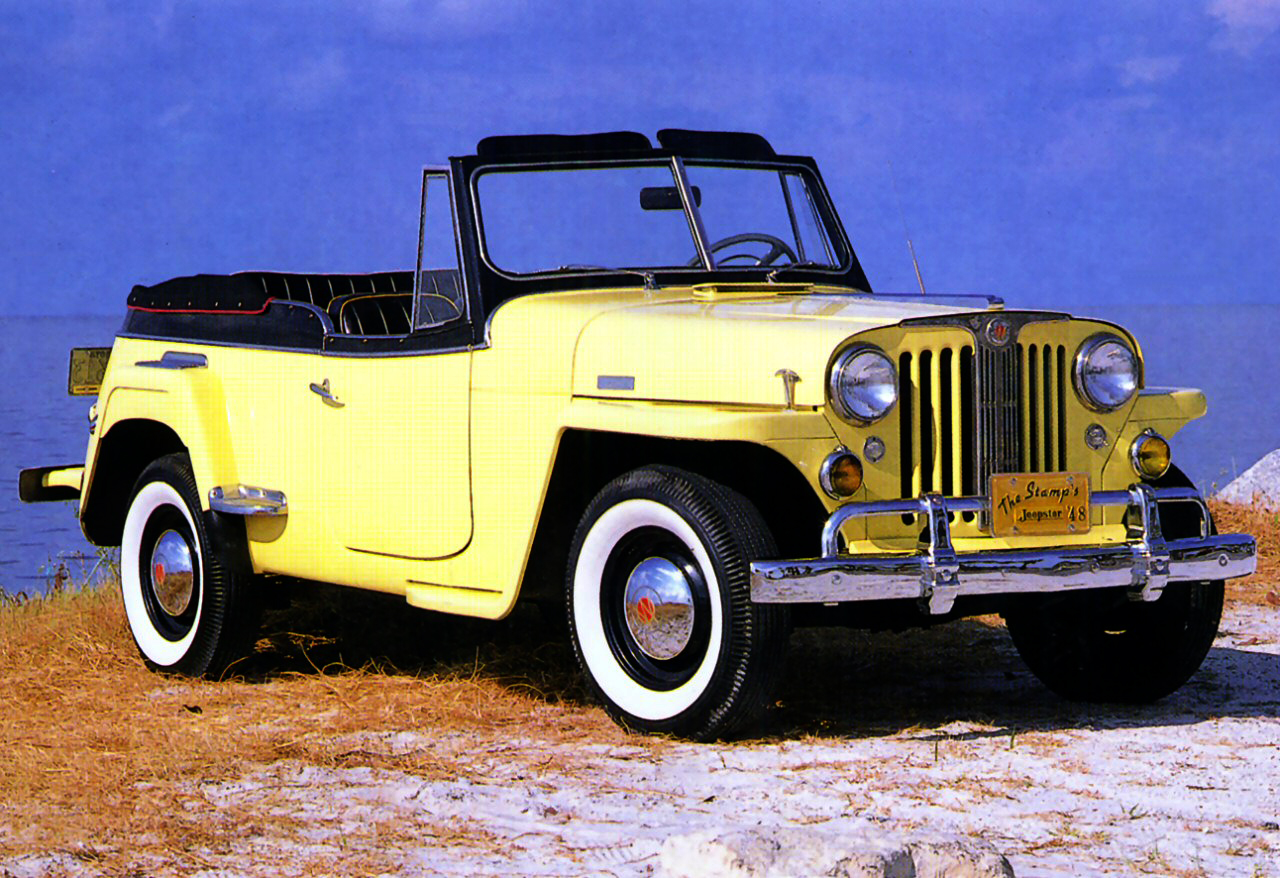

Overview
- Manufacturer: Willys-Overland Motors
- Production: 1948–1950
- Assembly: United States: Toledo, Ohio (Toledo Complex)
- Designer: Brooks Stevens

Body and chassis
- Body style: 2-door phaeton/convertible
- Layout: FR layout
- Related: Willys Jeep Station Wagon; Willys Jeep Truck

Powertrain
- Engine: 134.1 cu in (2.2 L) I4; 148.5 cu in (2.4 L) I6; 161 cu in (2.6 L) I6
- Transmission: 3-speed manual with overdrive

Dimensions
- Wheelbase: 104 in (2,642 mm)
- Length: 174 in (4,420 mm)
- Width: 69 in (1,753 mm)
- Height: 62 in (1,575 mm)
- Curb weight: 4-cylinder: 2,468 lb (1,119 kg); 6-cylinder: 2,392 lb (1,085 kg)

The Willys-Overland Jeepster is an automobile originally produced by Willys-Overland Motors from 1948 until 1950. It was developed to fill a gap in the company's product line, crossing over from their "utilitarian" proto SUVs and trucks to the passenger automobile market.

The Jeepster initially included numerous deluxe features and interior fittings in addition to a high level of standard equipment that cost extra on other automobiles. A total of almost 20,000 were manufactured.

The Jeepster name was revived in 1966 on a new model, the C-101 Jeepster Commando.

== Background ==
After World War II, Jeep trademark owner, Willys (pronounced "WILL-iss"), began producing and marketing the "CJ" (for Civilian Jeep) to farmers, foresters, and others with similar utilitarian needs. The company also began producing the Jeep Wagon/Panel Utility/Pick-up in 1946, and the Jeep Truck in 1947.

Seeing a gap in their product lineup, Willys developed the Jeepster to cross over from their "utilitarian" trucks into the passenger-car market. It was to expand its Jeep work truck focus and thus broaden Willys' customer base. The new sporty rear-wheel-drive-only model was to have a "dual personality for city and country driving," and marketing emphasized it as "America's greatest value in sports cars!"

Willys-Overland lacked the machinery to form deep-drawn fenders or complicated shapes, so the vehicle had to use a simple and slab-sided design. Industrial designer Brooks Stevens styled a line of postwar vehicles for Willys using a common platform that included the Jeep pickup and station wagon, as well as a sporty two-door open car that he envisioned as a sports car for veterans of World War II.

The Willys-Overland Jeepster ("VJ" internally) was introduced in April 1948, and produced through 1950. Some leftover models were sold under the 1951 model year.

== 1948 ==
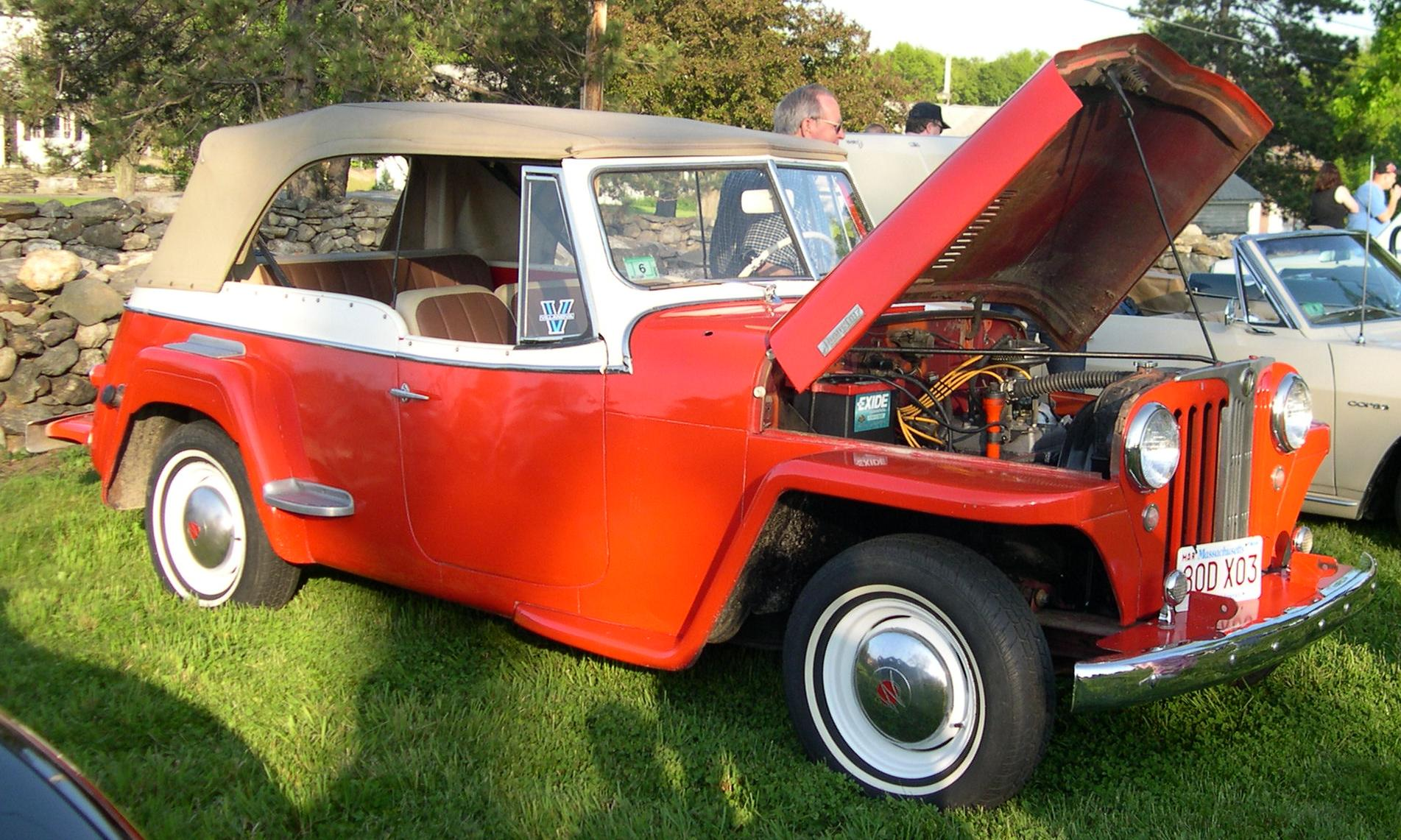
1948 Willys Jeepster

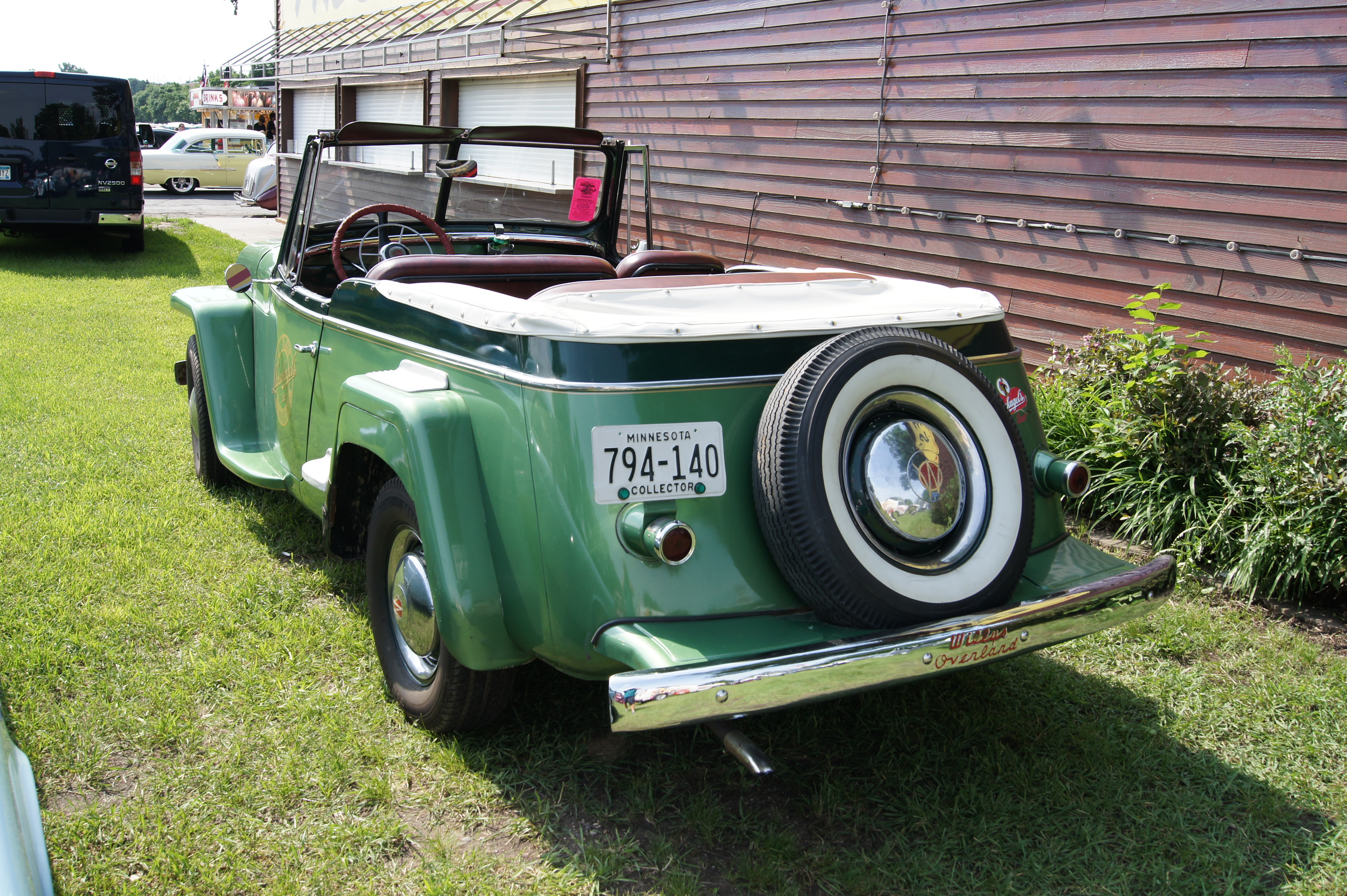
1949 Jeepster standard Continental kit

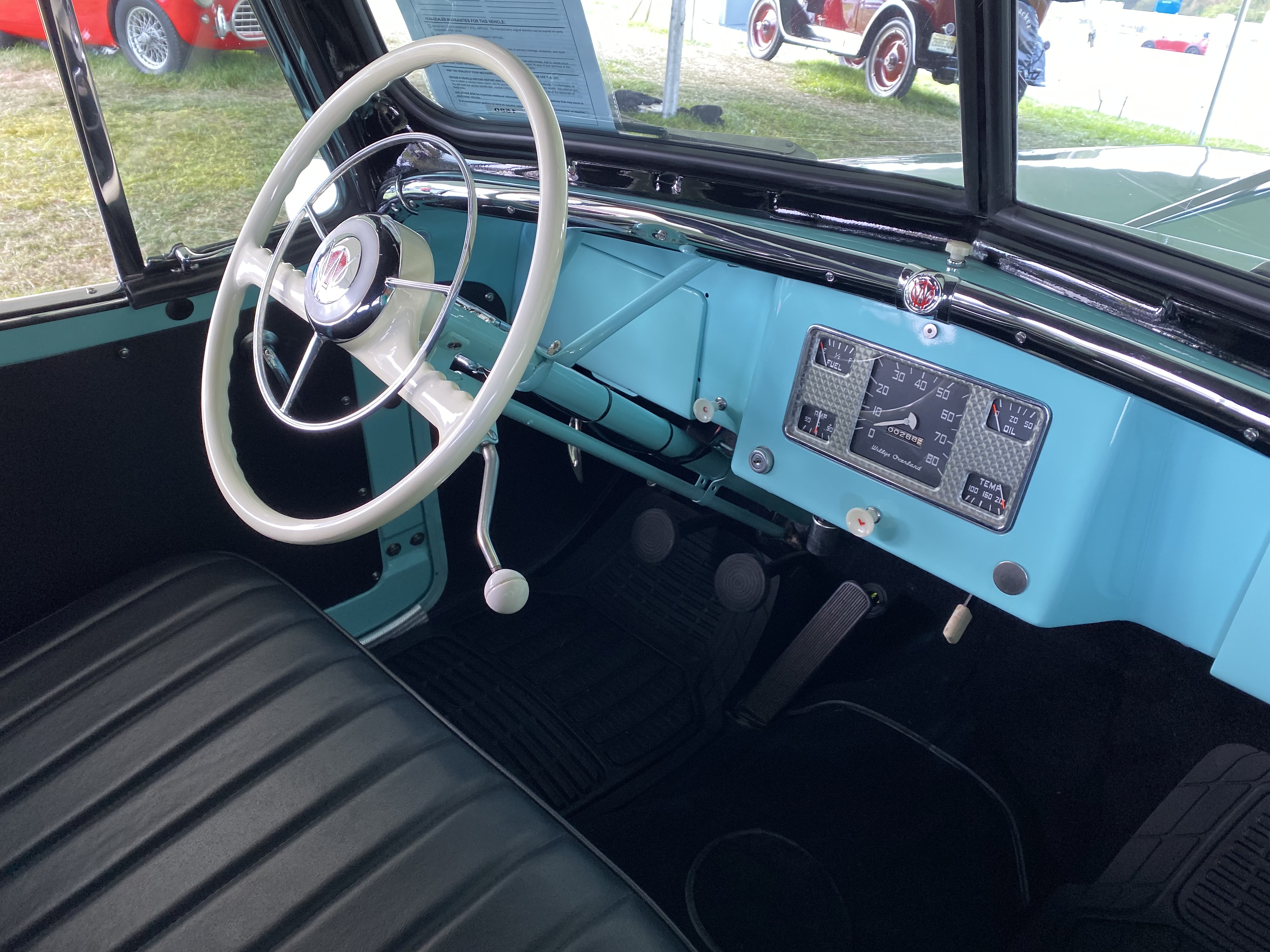
1949 Jeepster interior

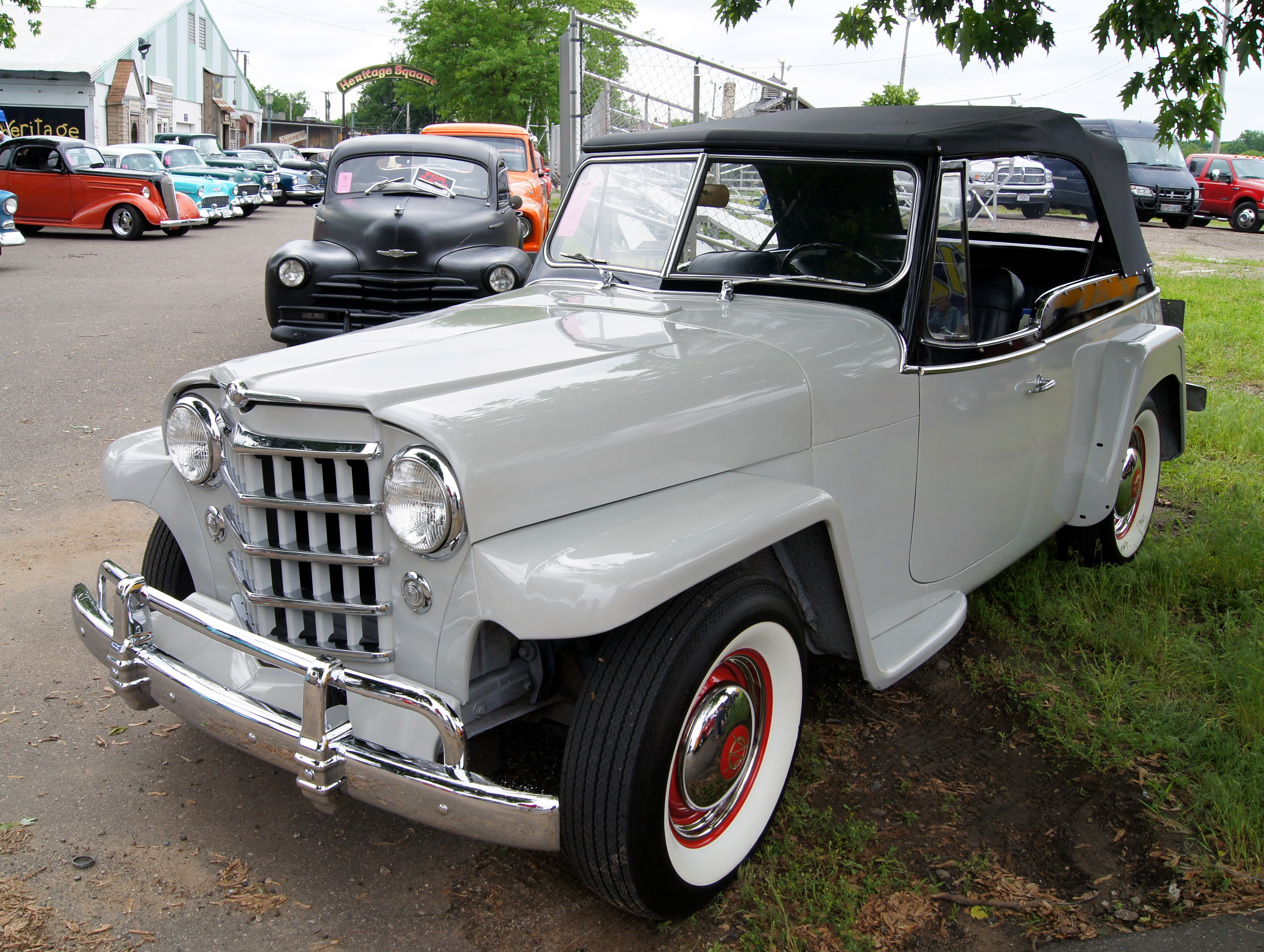
1950 Jeepster

The basic 1948 Jeepster included numerous deluxe features and interior fittings in addition to a high level of standard equipment that cost extra on other automobiles. These included, among many others, whitewall tires, hubcaps with bright trim rings, sun visors, deluxe steering wheel, wind wings, locking glovebox, cigar lighter, and continental tire with fabric cover. The Jeepster had Willys' World War II-proven 134.2 cu in (2.2 L) straight-4 "Go Devil" engine, and plastic side curtains, but its US$1,765 price was about the same as a Ford Super DeLuxe Club convertible with roll-down windows, fancier styling, and a V8 engine.

The car was only offered with rear-wheel drive, thus limiting its appeal to typical Jeep customers. Its distinctive boxy styling and performance were praised by automotive journalists. However, the Jeepster did not catch on with the intended market segment. Sales were also limited by sparse advertising and an insufficient dealer network.

The Jeepster's I4 engine was rated at 63 hp (47 kW; 64 PS) and coupled to a Borg-Warner T-96 3-speed manual transmission with an overdrive unit as standard. The Planadyne single transverse leaf spring independent front suspension, entire drivetrain, front end, rear suspension, steering, and four-wheel drum brakes were from the Willys Station Wagon. The flat-topped rear fenders were taken from the Jeep truck line.

== 1949 ==
The 1949 Jeepster began production with a one-model/one-engine offering. The price was lowered to $1,495, with some previously standard features returning as extra-cost options. Toward the middle of the year, an additional model was introduced, the VJ3-6, powered by Willys' new L148 Lightning I-6 engine.

== 1950 ==
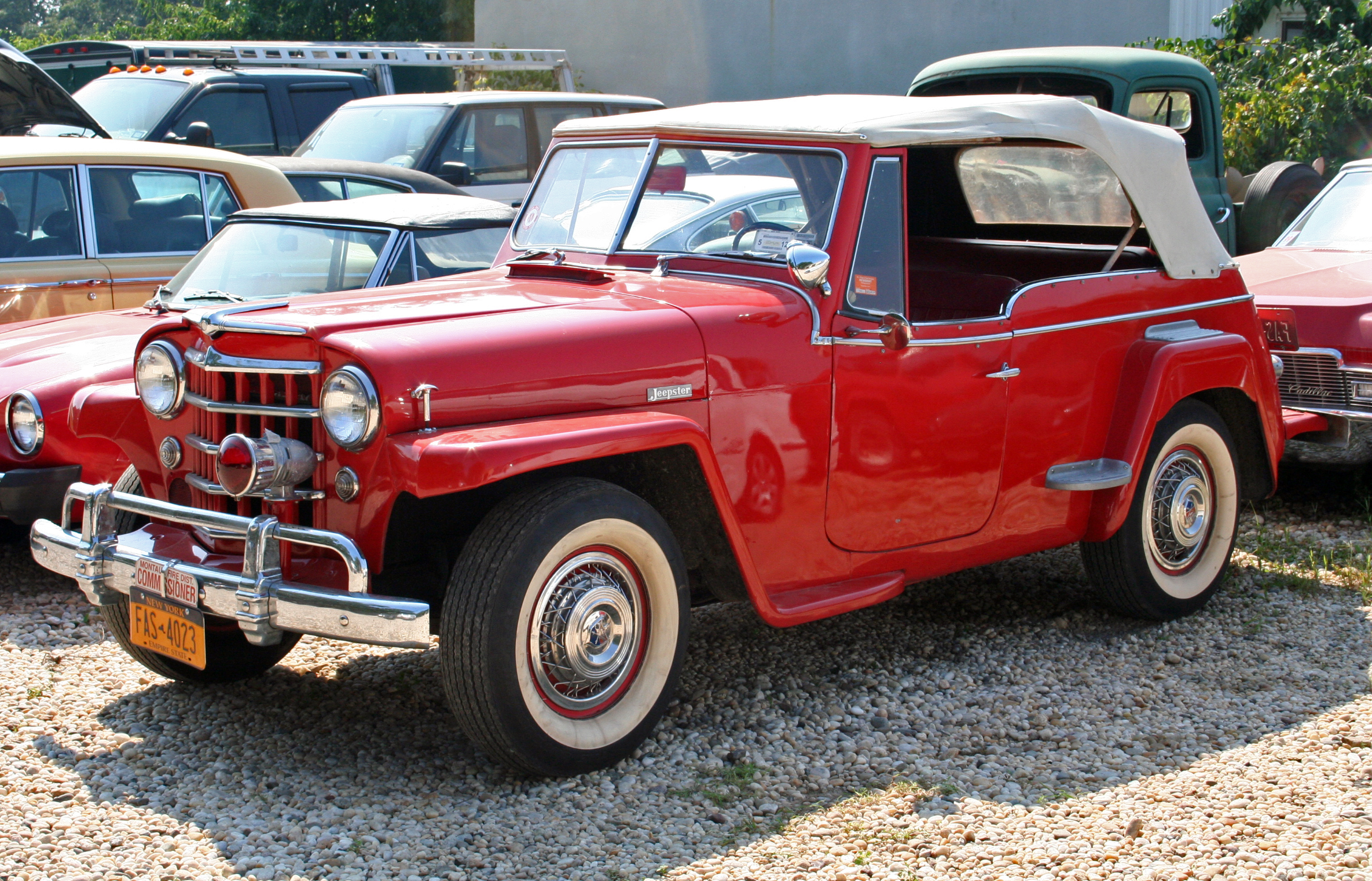
1950 Willys Jeepster

The 1950 model year featured the VJ-3 Jeepster's first styling revisions that included a new instrument panel and redesigned front end featuring a V-shaped grille with horizontal chrome trim. A new model was introduced with reduced standard equipment at a lower price.

Willys' L161 Lightning six-cylinder was offered in addition to the standard Go Devil four-cylinder engine.

Model designations were dependent on production timeframe, with early 1950s four-cylinder Jeepsters given VJ-3 463 and six-cylinders VJ-3 663, changed to VJ-473 and VJ-673, respectively, for later year vehicles.

== Engines ==
- 1948–1950: L134 Go Devil I4 — 134.1 cu in (2,198 cc)
- 1949–1950: L148 Lightning I6 —148.5 cu in (2,433 cc)
- 1950: F134 Hurricane I4 —134.2 cu in (2,199 cc)
- 1950: L161 Lightning I6 —161 cu in (2,638 cc)

== Epilogue ==
The Jeepster's problems in the marketplace were its limited utility and practicality. It also looks rugged and off-road capable, but is not. Appeal is limited due to the basic construction, poor all-weather protection, and the low performance when equipped with the I-4 engine. Even with an optional six-cylinder engine and offering the VJ3 version at a lower price, the Jeepsters did not draw many new buyers due to three factors: a relatively high price, low performance, and the lack of roll-up door windows.

Model year sales:

- 1948: 10,326
- 1949: 2,960
- 1950: 5,836

A total of 19,132 Jeepsters were produced.

== Revival ==
Kaiser revived the Jeepster name for the 1967 model year as the C-101 Jeepster Commando. The new version included roll-up door windows, a V6 engine, and four-wheel-drive. It was available as a pickup truck, convertible, and station wagon, in addition to the roadster. American Motors Corporation (AMC) purchased Kaiser's Jeep utility-vehicle operations in 1970 to complement its existing passenger-car business. The Jeepster was reengineered to use AMC engines (a 232 cu in (3.8 L) or 258 cu in (4.2 L) I6, or a 304 cu in (5.0 L) V8). The Jeepster name was removed after 1971. For the 1972 model year, the wheelbase was extended, and a facelift featured a unique full-width grille. Production of the Commando ended in 1973 in favor of the full-sized SJ Cherokee that was introduced for the 1974 model year.

== See also ==
- History of crossover SUVs
- Kaiser Motors
- Willys Jeep
