= Ashot Ashkelon =

Ashot Ashkelon Industries Ltd
- Native name: עשות אשקלון תעשיות
- Type: Public company
- Traded as: TASE: ASHO
- Industry: Defense, Aerospace
- Founded: 1951; 75 years ago
- Founder: Efraim Ilin
- Headquarters: Ashkelon, Israel
- Revenue: ▲₪ 394.59 million (2024)
- Net income: ▲₪ 48.68 million (2024)
- Total equity: ₪ 430.11 million (2024)
- Number of employees: 430 (2024)
- Parent: Efraim Ilin (1951–67); IMI Systems (1967–18); Elbit Systems (2018–22); FIMI (2022–present, 85%)
- Subsidiaries: Reliance Gear Corporation
- Website: www.ashot.co.il

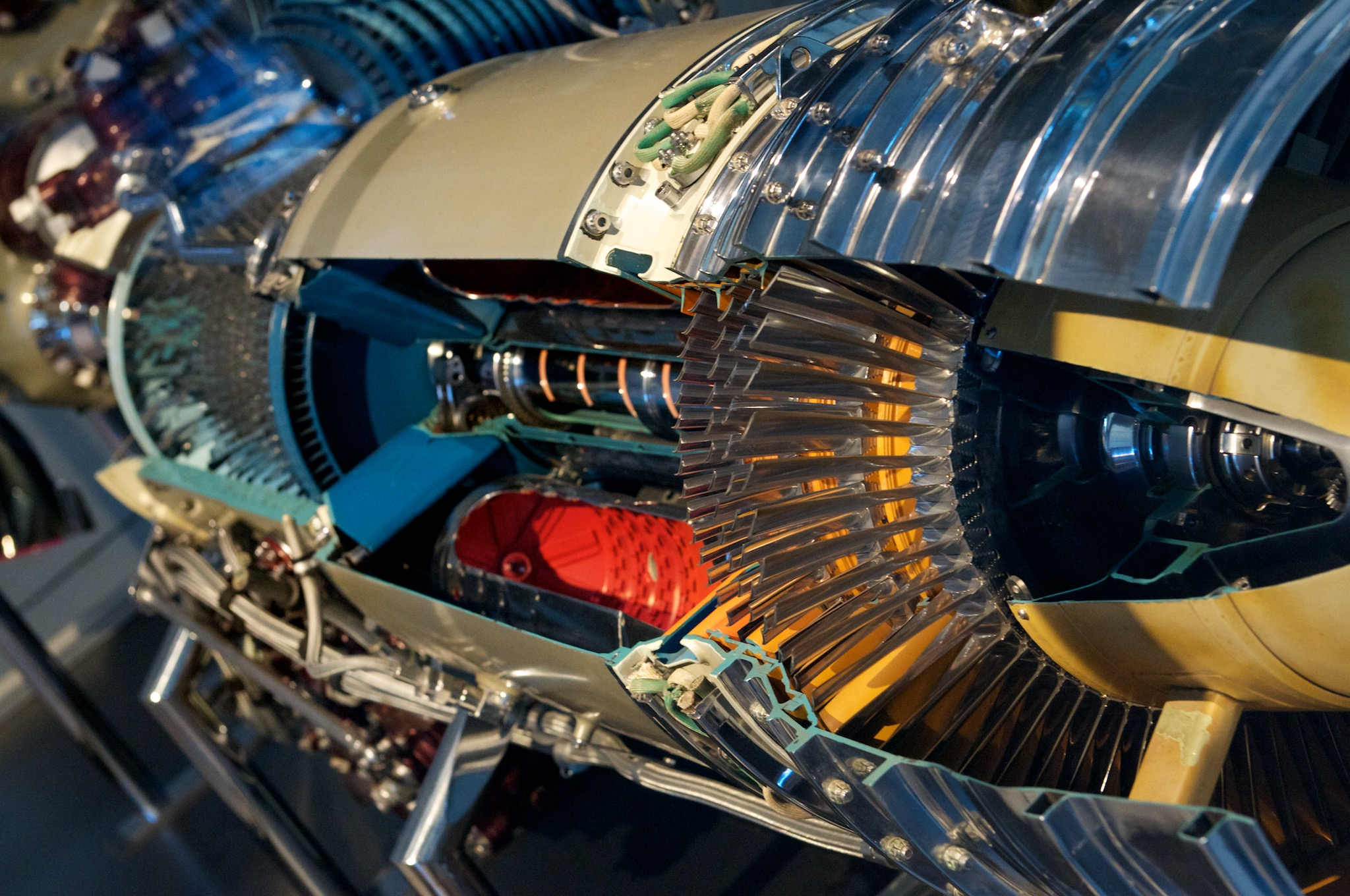
Ashot supplied parts for the Allison jet engine

Ashot Ashkelon Industries Ltd (TASE: ASHO) is an Israeli manufacturer of build to print products such as: gears, transmissions and gearboxes to the Aerospace, Military, and Automotive industries. Headquartered in Ashkelon, it has 560 employees.

Ashot was a subsidiary of the Israel Military Industries Ltd. (IMI, also known as IMI Systems and later Elbit Systems Land) and is publicly traded on the Tel Aviv Stock Exchange. Following the purchase of IMI by Elbit Systems in 2018, it was controlled by Elbit Systems Land.

On June 30, 2022, FIMI Opportunity Funds acquired a majority stake in Ashot for $84 million.

== History ==
Ashot Ashkelon was founded in 1951 as Kaiser-Ilin Industries by businessman Efraim Ilin. Initially as a factory for assembling Kaiser-Frazer cars and Mack Trucks under license; Kaiser-Ilin had two production sites, one in Haifa (which opened in 1951) where the vehicle assembly line was based and one in Ashkelon (which was opened in 1960), for manufacturing spare parts for automotive equipment, gears and metal-working machinery.

During the 1960 the company got into financial difficulties and the vehicle assembly line was closed; the Ashkelon plant continue to operate at a loss. In 1967, it was acquired by Israel Military Industries and its name changed to Ashot Ashkelon Industries.

In 1990, Ashot signed a long term supply contract with Boeing to manufacture transmission systems used in the rudder mechanisms of Boeing 747 and Boeing 757 aircraft.

In 1992, the company had an initial public offering on the Tel Aviv Stock Exchange. The same year, the company signed a 20 years frame agreement with the Allison Engine Company, at the time a division of General Motors, to manufacture parts for 20 different engine types. The agreement was estimated to represent a total potential income of $100–140 million.

In 2007, Ashot won a tender to manufacture the Drivetrain and hydro-mechanical suspension enabling cross-country mobility, for both the Merkava Mk. 4 tank and the Namer Armoured personnel carrier.

In 2011, Ashot acquired Illinois based Reliance Gear Corporation, a manufacturer of custom and precision gearing that was founded 1965, which today operates as a fully owned subsidiary of Ashot.

== Products ==
=== Aerospace ===
- High Lift Systems
- Jet Engine Shafts
- Landing Gear parts
- Transmissions & Gears
- Tungsten Weights
- Universal Joints

=== Defense ===
- Final Drives
- Penetrators and Fragmentation Parts
- Suspensions
- Transmissions and Gears

=== Automotive ===
- Automatic transmissions
- Clutch independent drives
- Drive axles
- Mass transit gearboxes
- Oil pumps
- Power take off units
- Transmission range shaft

== See also ==
- Israel Military Industries
