= Cooper Motor Sales =

Cooper Motor Sales (also referred to as Cooper Auto Sales) was located in Johnson County, Indiana on U.S. 31 from 1946 to 1967. It was located north of Franklin, Indiana, where Hubler Ford stands today.

== History ==
Cooper Motor Sales first opened on October 21, 1946 by Dale Cooper, a former Army Air Force Pilot from North Vernon, Indiana. The shop originally sold new Kaiser-Frazer automobiles and later Oldsmobiles. Cooper sold a variety of used cars and other items including motorcycles, trucks, tractors and farming equipment.

The business included a service station and repair garages. The facilities were expanded multiple times including in 1964 when Dale Cooper obtained a permit to build a new 120 ft. × 50 ft. service shop. When the dealership was first opened, it fell outside of the city limits on the expanded and rerouted US-31.

== Restaurant ==
On September 6, 1948, Dale Cooper opened a restaurant on the property known as Cooper's Grill. The air-conditioned restaurant was in a brick building and was first managed by Arthur Palmer of Whiteland. Cooper's Grill was known for serving hamburgers and steaks and was, at the time, open 24 hours. The restaurant was a meeting spot for area coaches drawing up their upcoming athletic schedules and electing coaching association leaders. The restaurant closed in 1963.

== Motel ==
In 1951, Dale Cooper received a permit to build a motel on the property. The 15-unit motel building was built in an 'L' shape around the car dealership. Cooper sought to build an addition to the hotel in 1953.

In October 1964, a stabbing occurred at Cooper's Motel. A 16-year-old Georgia teenager stabbed a much bigger 27-year-old man with a pocketknife, leaving him in serious condition. The juvenile claimed that the stabbing was in self-defense. The male stabbing victim, N.L. McGowan, had reportedly held girl kidnapped since September of that year and was already wanted in Georgia for having abducted the minor.

Richard Matlock purchased the motel in spring of 1972 and was in the process of changing the motel's name to "Matlock Motel".

On the morning of Saturday, January 20, 1973, a fire broke out the motel building. While no one was injured, the motel was destroyed and would never reopen.

== Ownership change and later years ==
In May 1967, Dale Cooper announced his intention to close the motor sales business citing the time that it took to run the business. Dale Cooper would retain ownership of Cooper's Motel.

Jack Kelley Ford operated at this location after Cooper Auto Sales closed. In February 1970, Richard Matlock purchased Jack Kelley Ford. Matlock and his family continued to operate Matlock Ford-Mercury until 2019, when it was announced that the dealership would be sold to Hubler. The buildings, even after the subsequent remodeling and expansions, still bore parts of the original Cooper building. In spring 2023, construction began on the new Hubler Ford building.
