= Raziel (disambiguation) =

Raziel may refer to:

- Raziel, an angel of ancient Jewish mysticism, and probably the original Raziel in history
- Raziel (Legacy of Kain), a character in the Legacy of Kain series of video games
- David Raziel, a fighter of the Jewish underground during the British Mandate of Palestine
- Raziel (wrestler), the ringname of a Mexican professional wrestler
