= Frazer (automobile) =

American luxury automobile

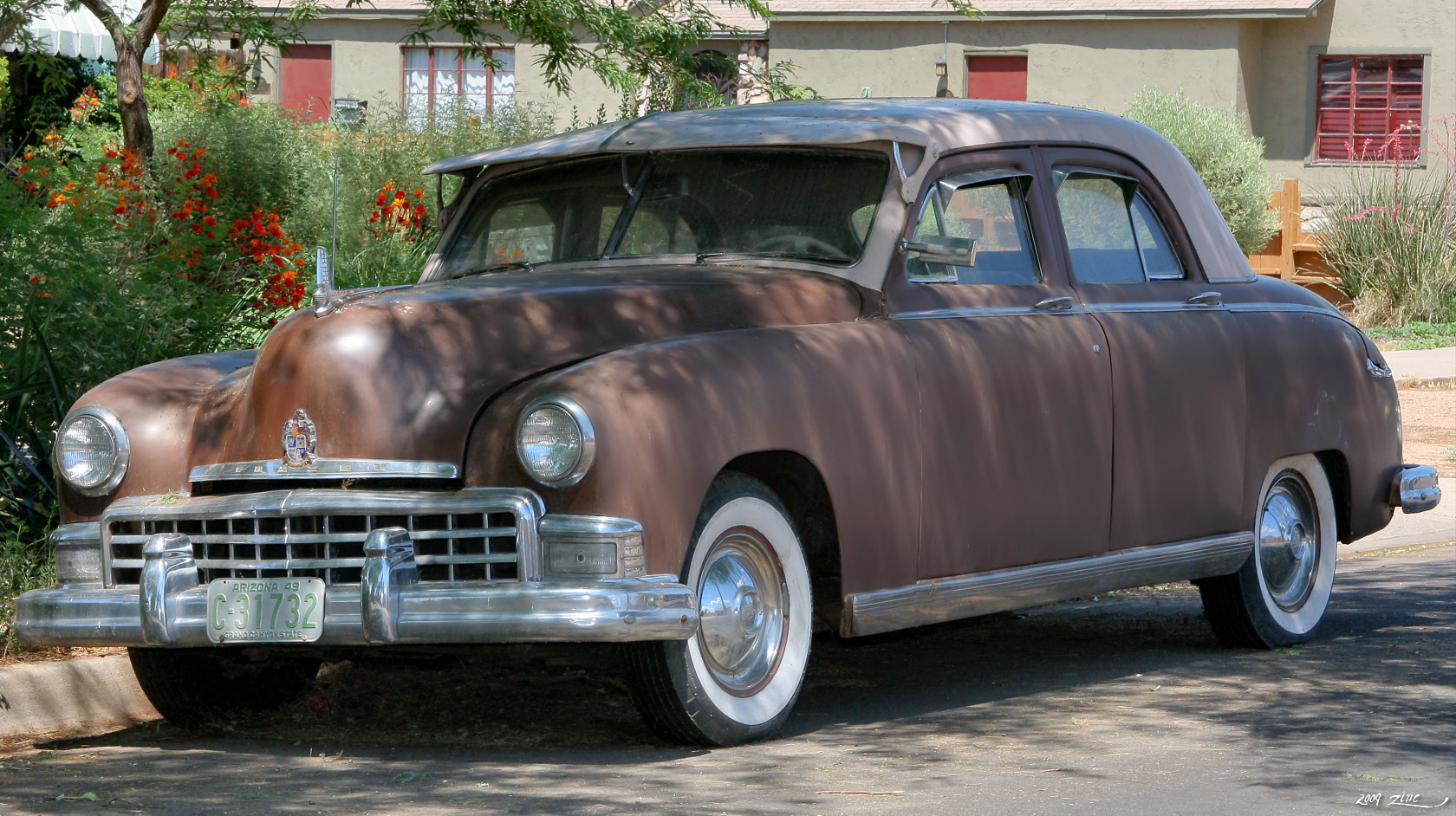
- 1949 Frazer Sedan

Overview
- Manufacturer: Kaiser-Frazer Corporation
- Production: 1946–1951
- Model years: 1947–1951
- Assembly: United States
- Designer: Howard "Dutch" Darrin

Body and chassis
- Class: Upper-medium / Luxury car
- Body style: 4-door sedan, 4-door convertible, hardtop sedan, hatchback sedan (Vagabond)
- Layout: Front-engine, rear-wheel-drive
- Platform: Kaiser-Frazer platform
- Related: Kaiser

Powertrain
- Engine: 226 cu in (3.70 L) L-head I6
- Transmission: 3-speed manual
- Propulsion: RWD

Dimensions
- Wheelbase: 122 inches (310 cm)
- Length: 189 inches (480 cm)
- Width: 71 inches (180 cm)
- Height: 61 inches (150 cm)
- Curb weight: 3,200 pounds (1,500 kg)

The Frazer was a line of upper-medium priced American luxury automobiles built by the Kaiser-Frazer Corporation for model years 1947 through 1951.

== History ==
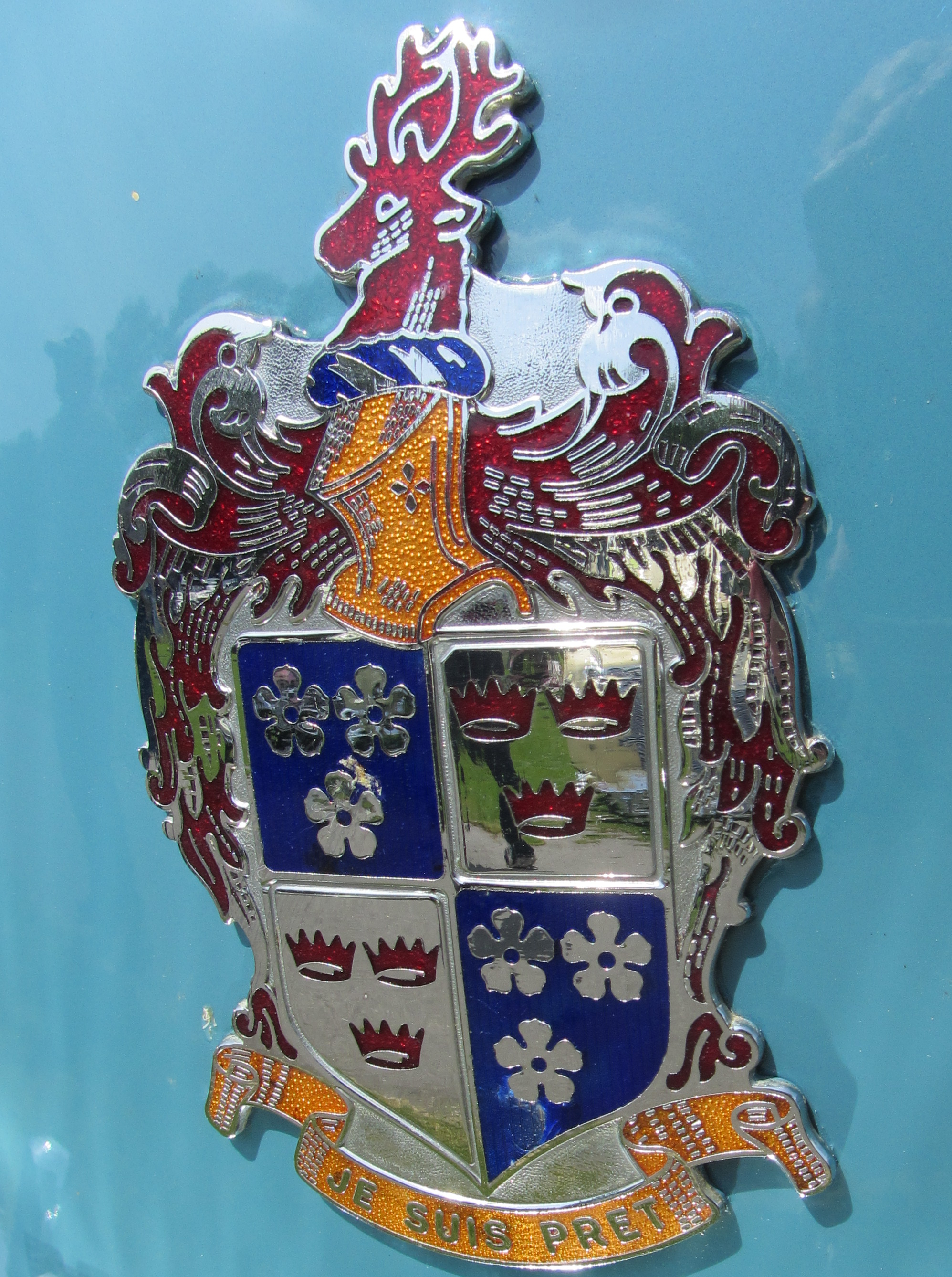
1947 Frazer badge

The Frazer was named for longtime American automobile executive Joseph W. Frazer who had become president and general manager of Kaiser-Frazer. The Frazer was styled by Howard "Dutch" Darrin with some input from other K-F stylists. The new Frazer won the Fashion Academy of New York Gold Medal for design achievement. Production began on May 29, 1946, and the Frazer made its public debut on June 29, 1946. There was one basic four-door sedan body shell that was shared with the similar but lower-priced (by $200 to $600) Kaiser. The Frazer used the Continental Red Seal 226 CID "Supersonic" L-head six engines, which reached 115 hp (86 kW) by the end of Frazer production after the 1951 model year. The luxury line Frazer Manhattan Series F47C was introduced on March 23, 1947, at a $500 premium over the original Frazer Series F-47, which continued on as the Standard. By 1948, Frazer sales totaled about 1.5% of all American cars built.

The dramatically restyled 1951 Frazer models included a four-door convertible, a hardtop sedan, and the Frazer Vagabond, a unique hatchback sedan. The final Frazers—which were face-lifted from leftover 1950 models—were introduced in March 1950 and were an immediate hit with the public. Over 50,000 orders were placed, but at that point, Joseph W. Frazer had left the company and K-F management decided to concentrate only on Kaiser production after building 10,214 of the 1951 Frazer when the supply of leftover 1950 bodies ran out.

A notable feature of the Frazer was that its four doors had push-button openers. This feature was shared at the time only by such cars as the Lincoln. Both Henry Kaiser and Joseph Frazer were convinced by evidence that the existing automobile manufacturers centered in Detroit had combined to shut off the supplies of materials and parts necessary for the success of the new automotive company.

== Gallery ==
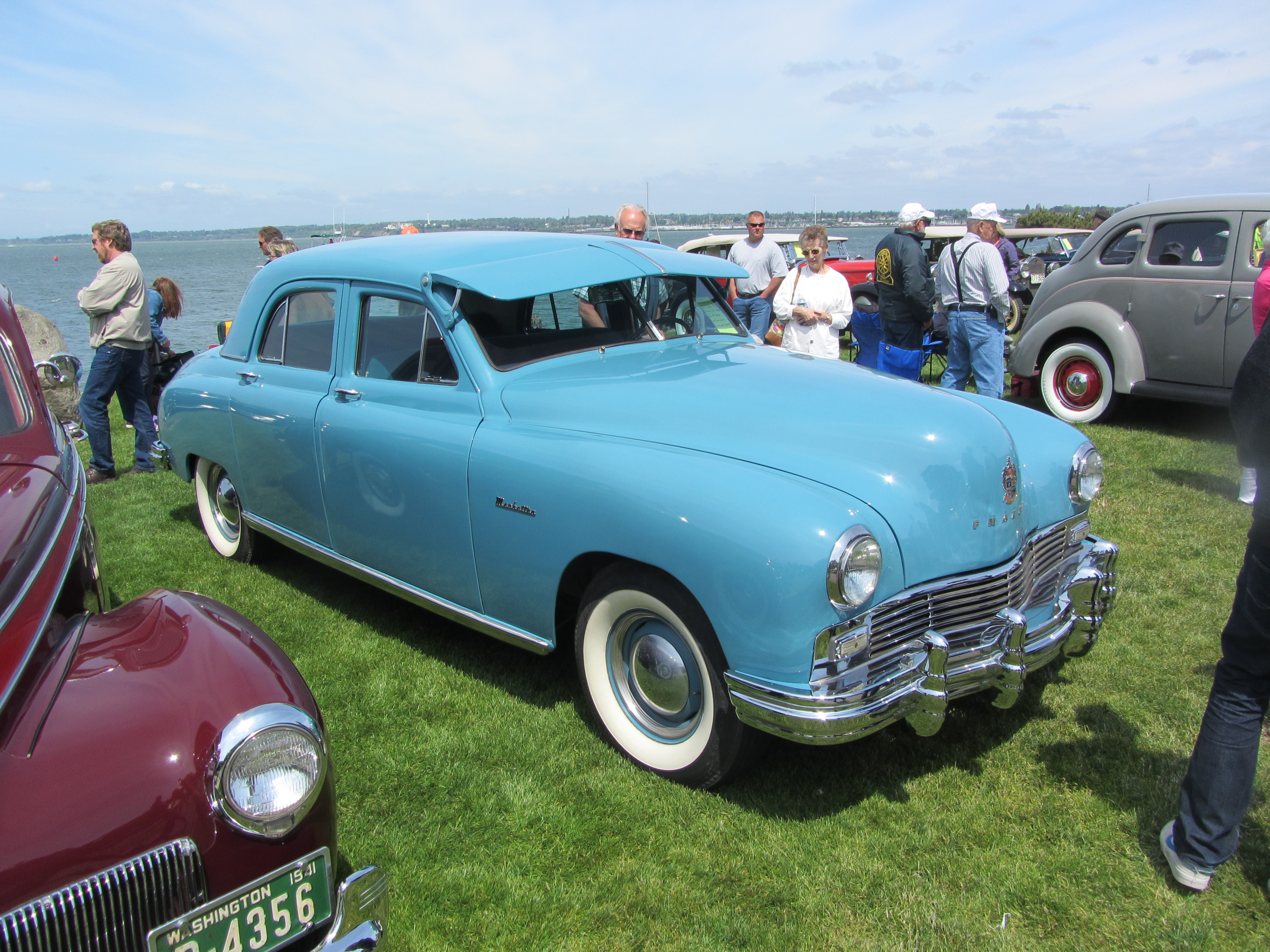
1947 Frazer Manhattan

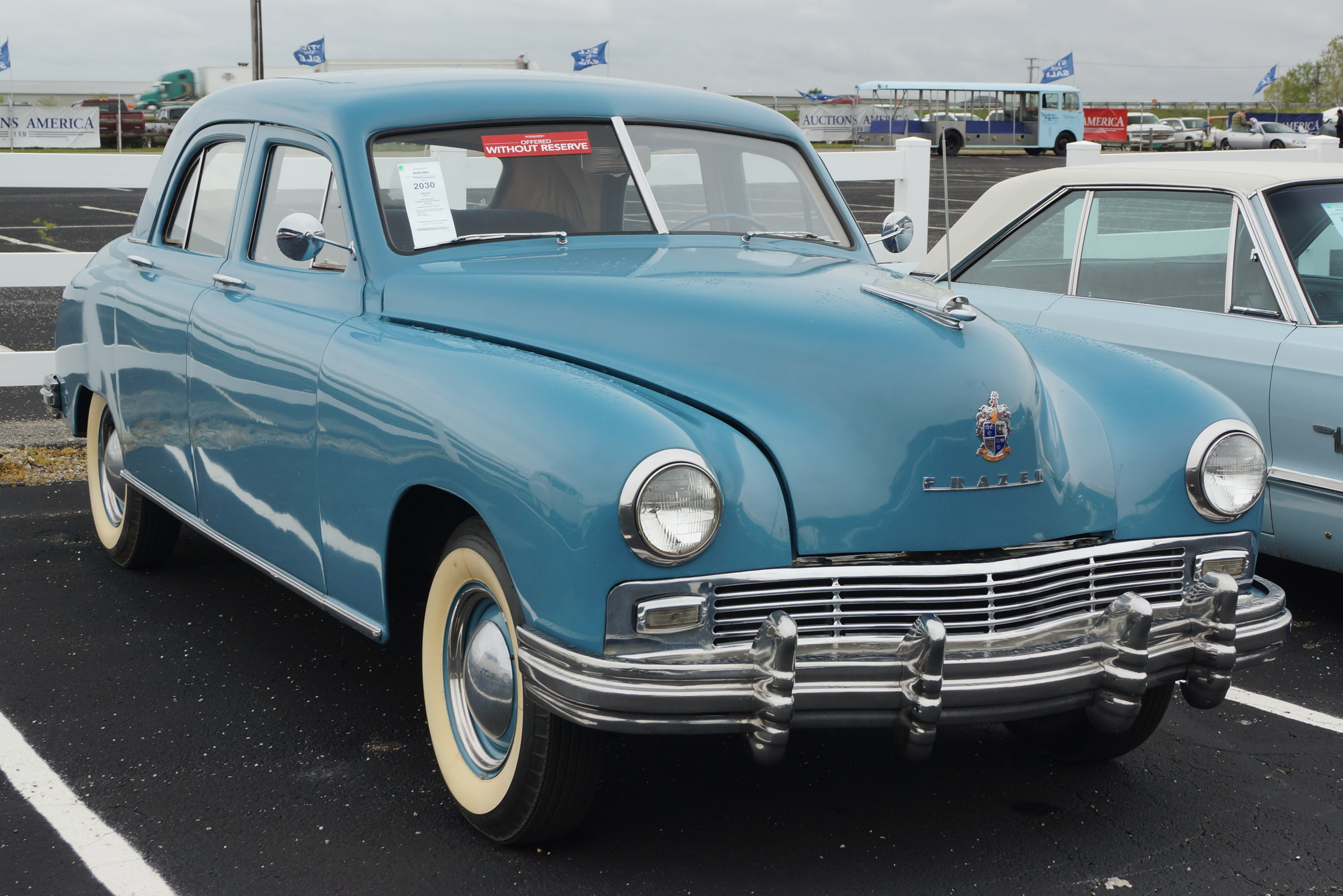
1948 Frazer Standard

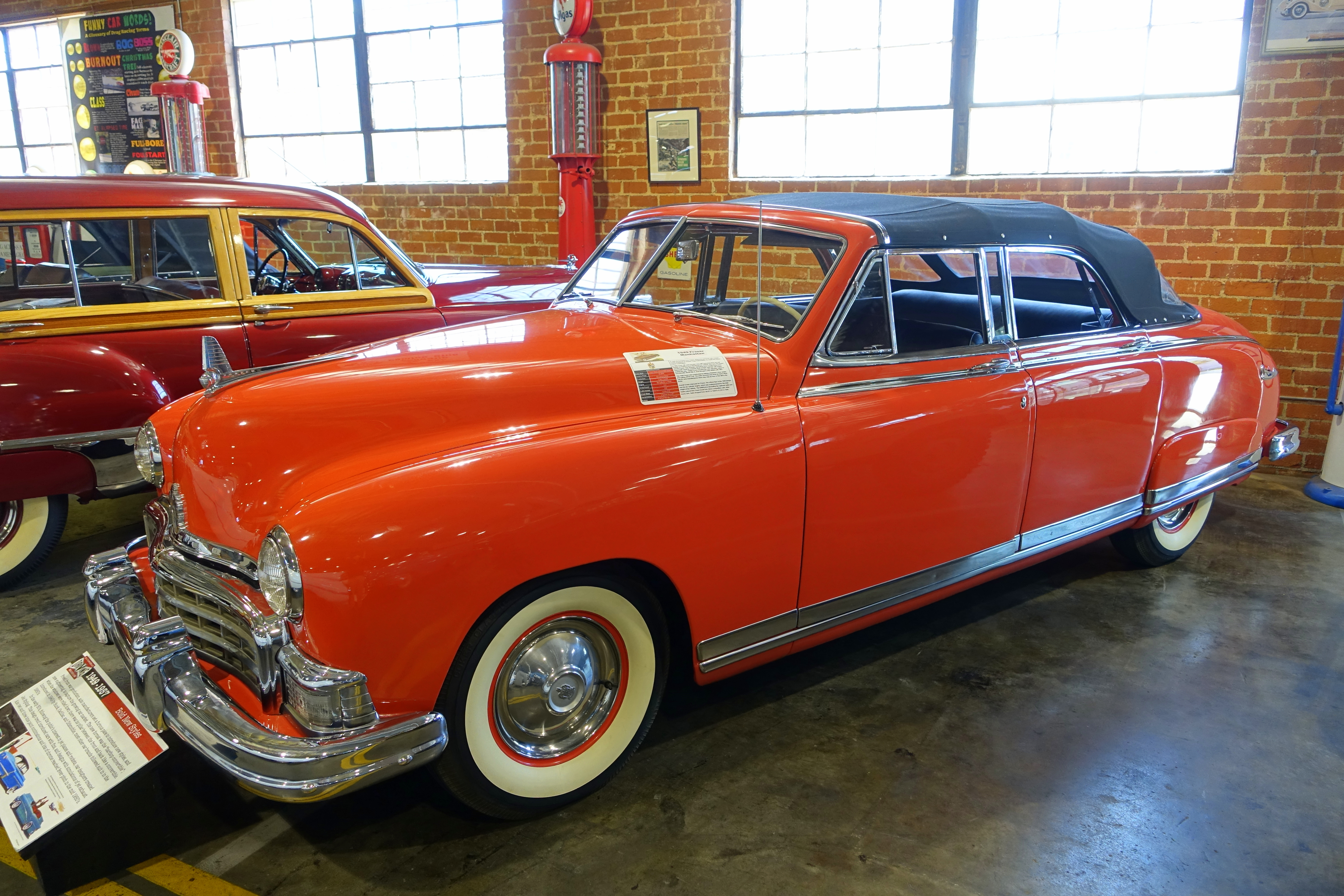
1949 Frazer Manhattan Convertible

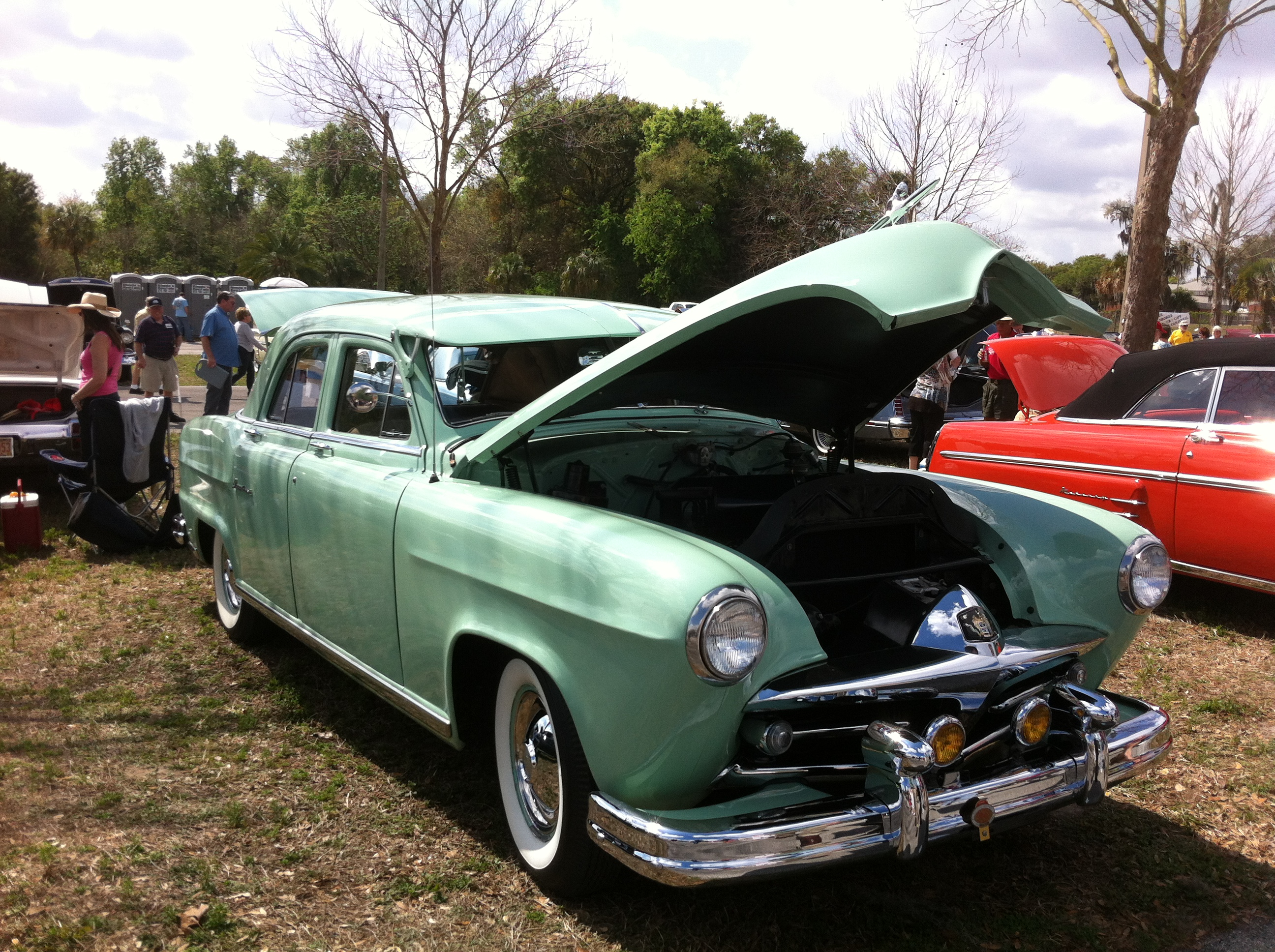
1951 Frazer Vagabond

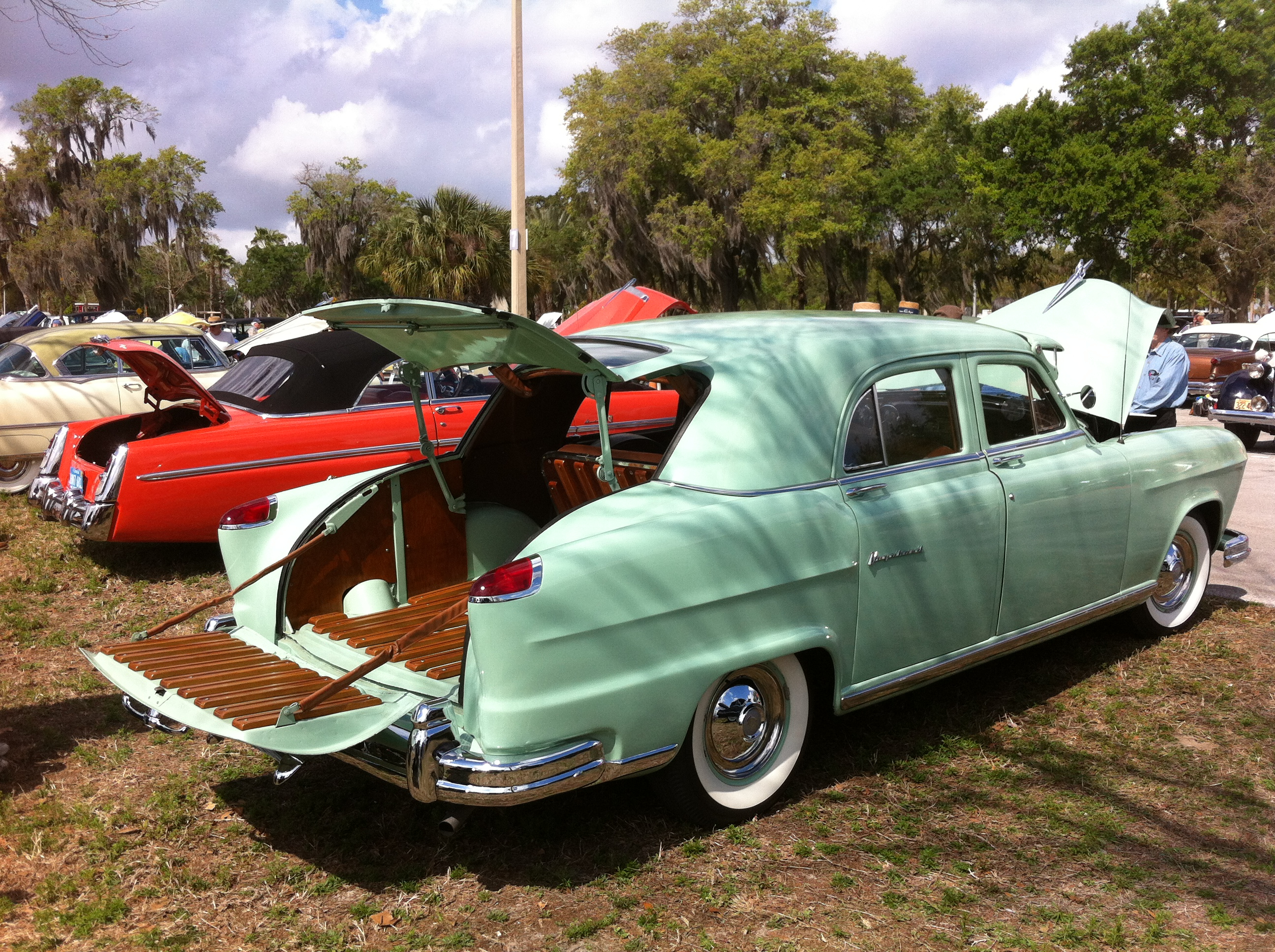
1951 Frazer Vagabond

== See also ==
- List of defunct United States automobile manufacturers
