= Hickman Price =

American businessman and government official (1911–1989)

Hickman Price Jr., (1911–1989) was the Assistant Secretary for Domestic Affairs in the United States Department of Commerce from 1961 to 1963 and a business executive with Kaiser-Frazer and Willys.

== Early life ==
Price was born on August 14, 1911, in Nashville, Tennessee. He attended Taft School, Phillips Exeter Academy, and Columbia University. He graduated from Columbia University with the class of 1934.

== Business career ==
From 1932 to 1934, Price assisted his father with farming wheat in the Texas Panhandle, at one point becoming the biggest wheat raiser in the state, as reported by Time magazine. However, bad weather forced him into bankruptcy. Price then moved on to become a member of the Bankers Trust Company in New York City. After leaving Texas in 1941, Price was appointed chief of the American Economic Mission to the Belgian Congo. Price returned in 1945 and was named executive assistant to the president of Graham-Paige Motors Corp. From 1945 to 1952, Price was vice president and director of the Kaiser-Frazer Corporation in Willow Run, Michigan.

In 1951 Price negotiated a two and a half million dollar deal with Israeli tycoon and security expert Efraim Ilin. Price put down half a million with Ilin bringing the other two million. Together they founded Kaiser in Israel. In 1952, Price became president and director of Willys Overland Export Corp., and Willys Overland of Canada. In 1954, Price was named be vice president of Willys Motors Inc. Price also served as president of Mercedes-Benz in São Paulo, Brazil. Price Jr. was a notable figure in the post-war automotive industry. Because of his leadership position with Kaiser-Frazer and Willys Overland, Price helped shape the character of the overseas car market.

== Political life ==
Price was also an influential social and political figure. He was an active Democrat and a staunch supporter of Governor G. Mennen Williams of Michigan and of the presidential aspirations of Adlai Stevenson and John F. Kennedy. Often consulted on matters of relations between the United States and Brazil, Price shared his expertise with members of the Kennedy administration. He further served his country with his appointment as Assistant Secretary of Commerce for Domestic Affairs, a position he held from 1961 to 1963.

== Personal life ==
Price was a nephew of Joseph P. Frazer. He married Dorothy Hurt. They had one son, Marston, who lived in Brazil and a daughter, Patricia Geisel who lived in Pennsylvania.

Price died of a heart attack at his Long Island home on August 24, 1989.
