= Kaiser Motors =

Former US motor vehicle manufacturer

- Industry: Automobiles
- Predecessor: Kaiser-Frazer Corporation
- Founded: July 14, 1945; 80 years ago
- Founder: Henry J. Kaiser
- Defunct: August 13, 1953; 72 years ago
- Fate: Merged with Willys-Overland Motors and re-named it Willys Motors; renamed it again as Kaiser Jeep Corporation
- Successor: Kaiser Jeep
- Headquarters: Willow Run, Michigan, United States
- Key people: Henry J. Kaiser, Edgar Kaiser
- Production output: 1945–1953
- Owner: Henry J. Kaiser

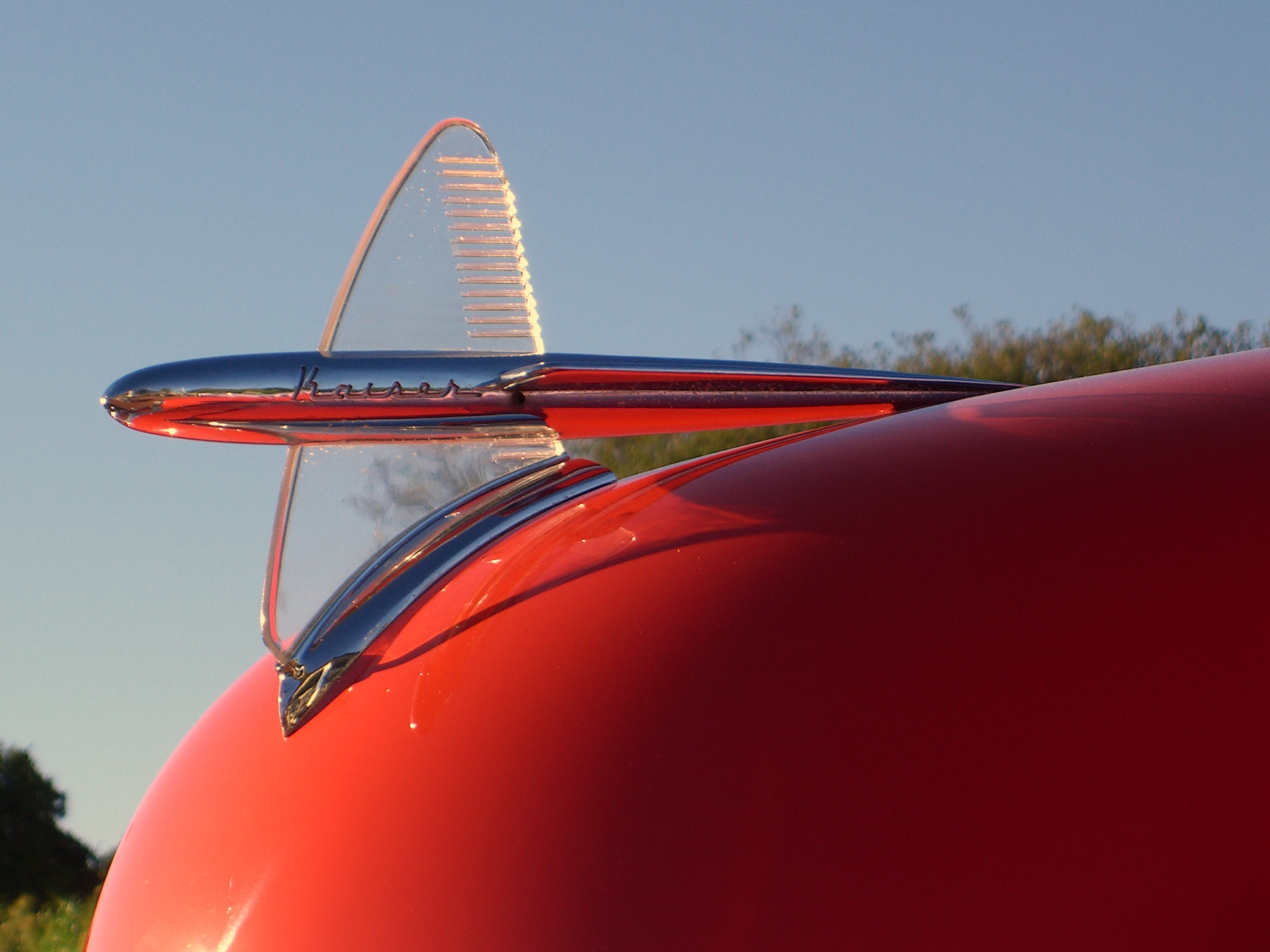
1949 hood ornament of the Virginian

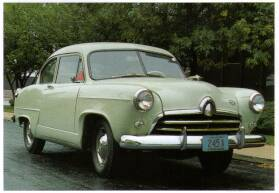
1952 Allstate

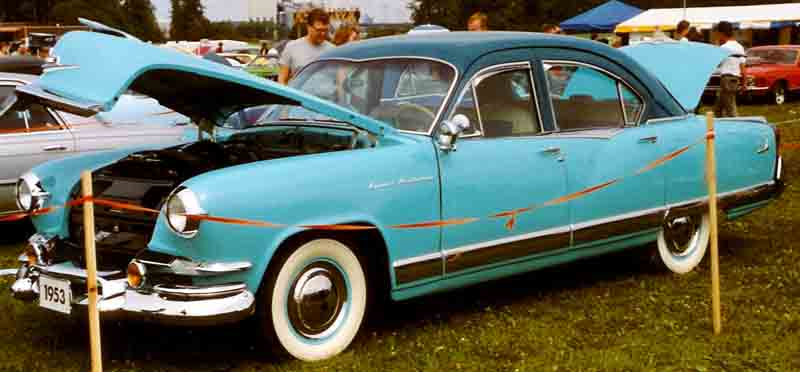
1953 Kaiser Manhattan

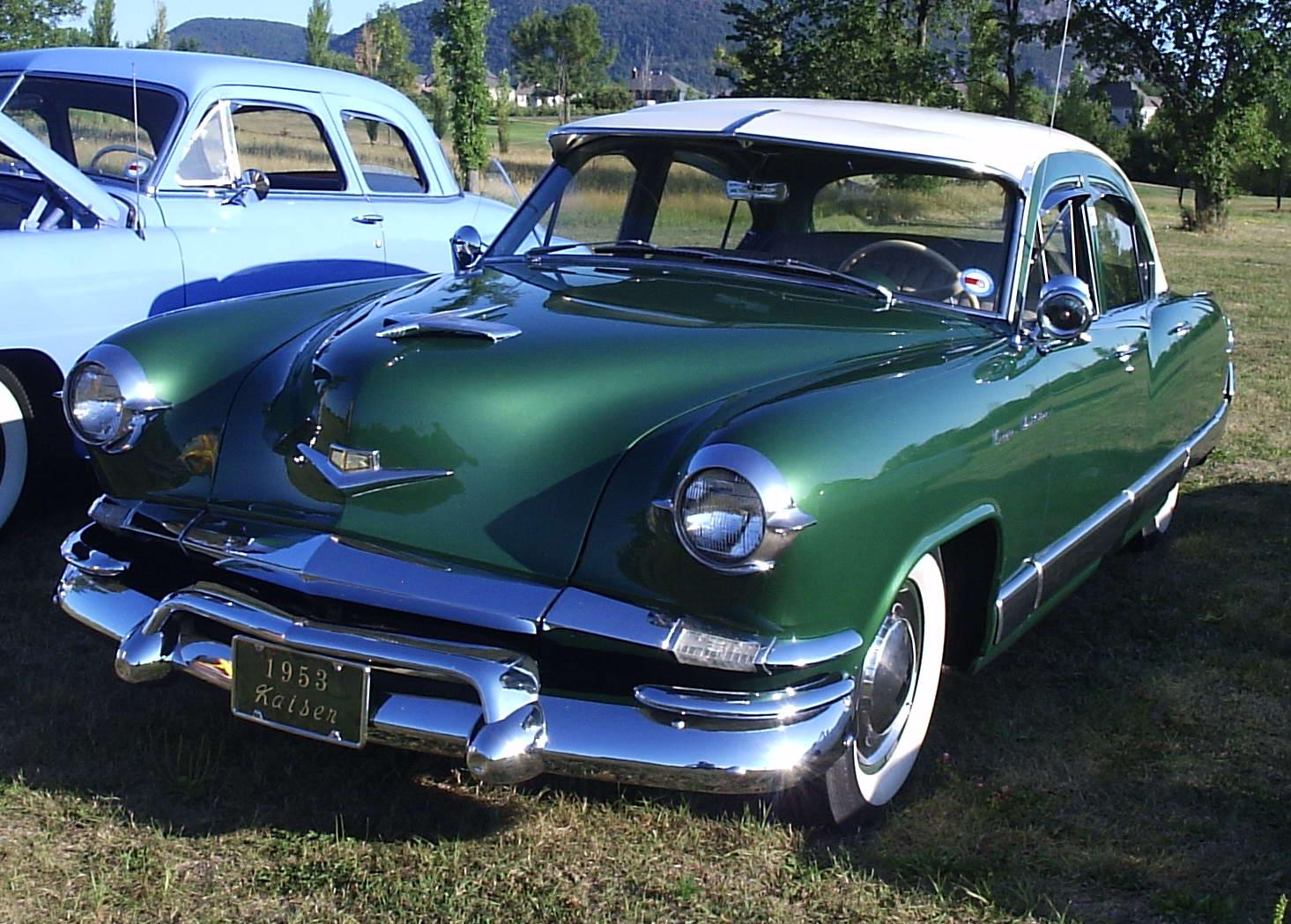
1953 Kaiser Custom 6

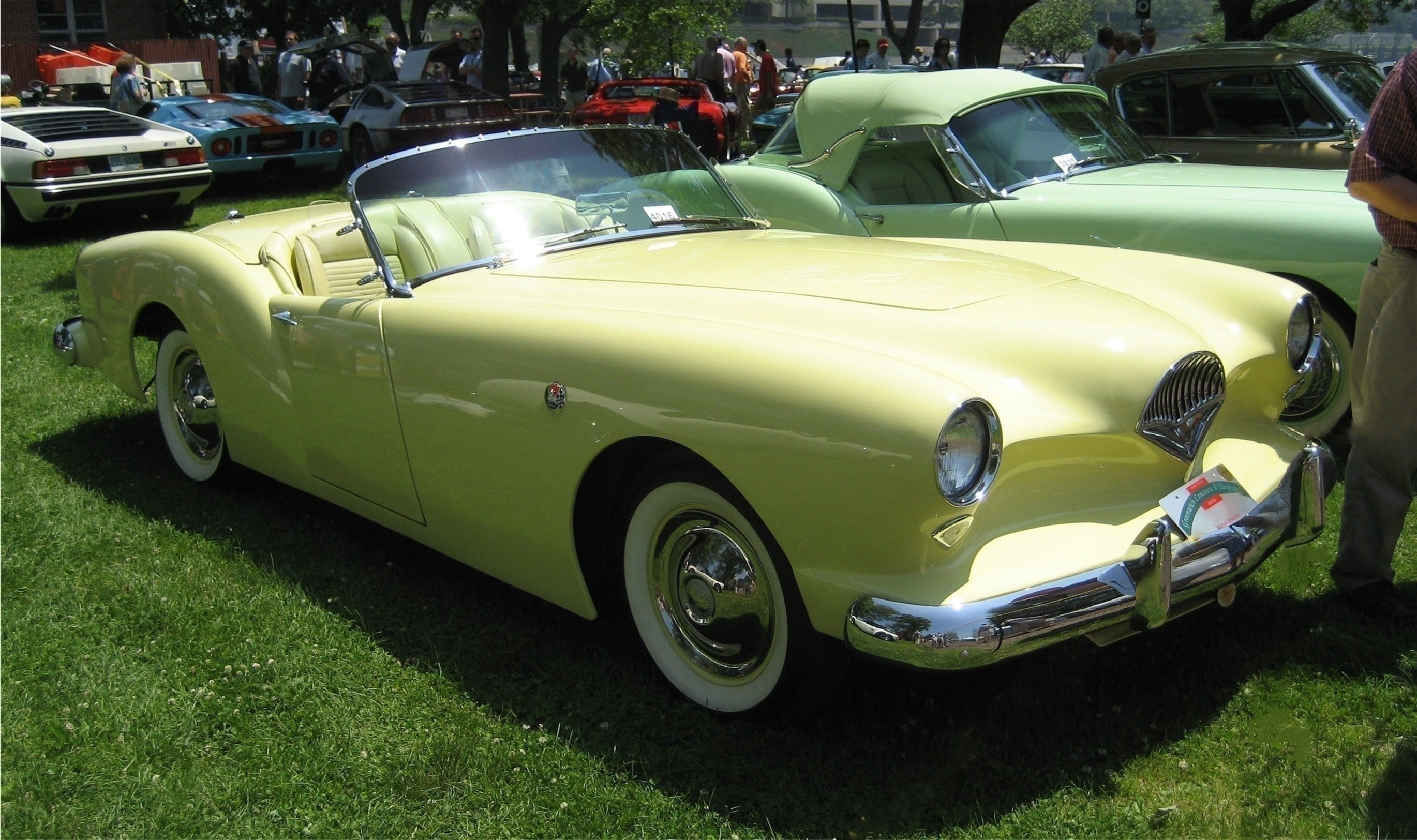
1954 Kaiser Darrin

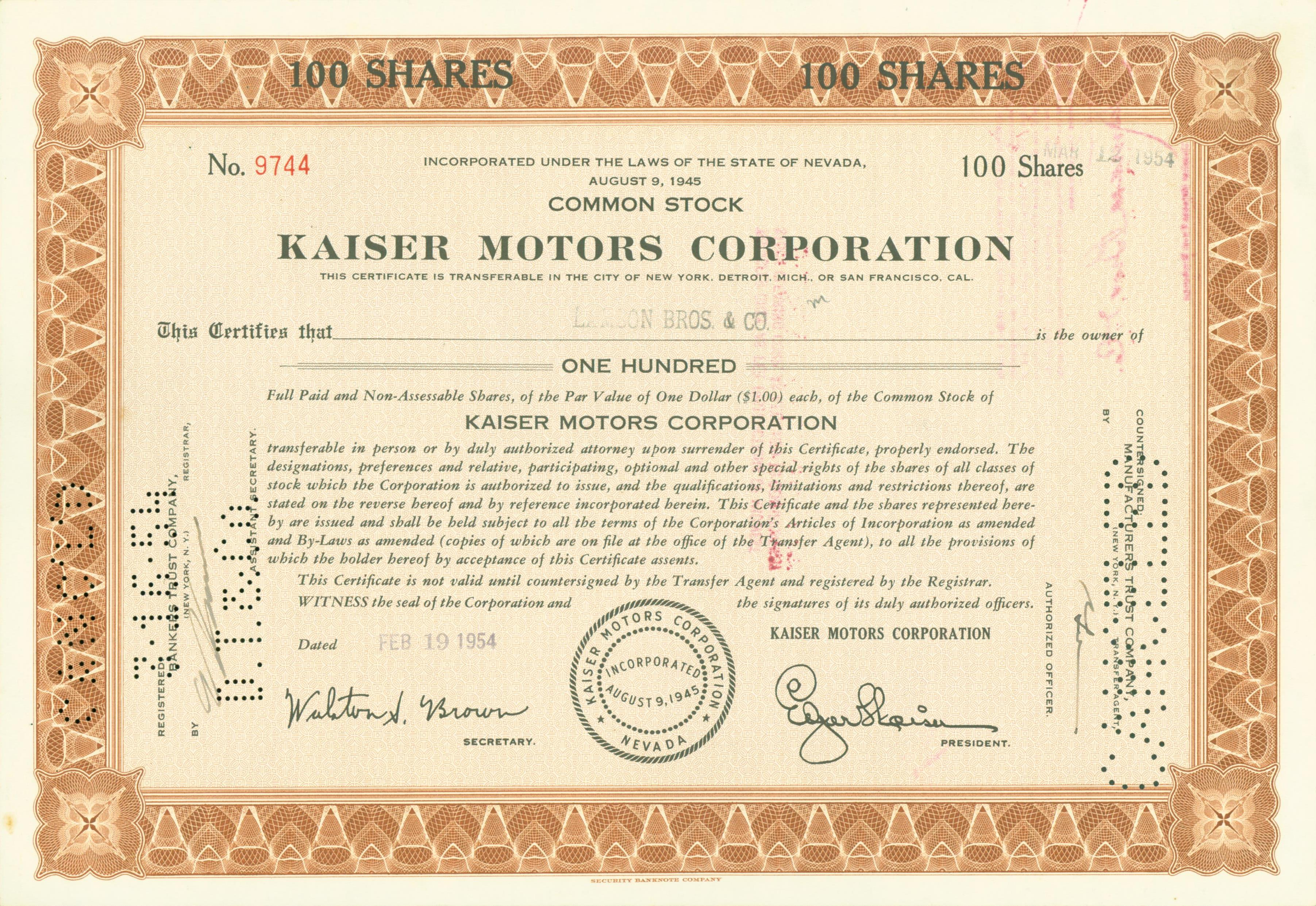
Share of the Kaiser Motors Corp., issued 19. February 1954

Kaiser Motors (formerly Kaiser-Frazer) Corporation made automobiles at Willow Run, Michigan, United States, from 1945 until 1953. In 1953, Kaiser merged with Willys-Overland to form Willys Motors Incorporated, moving its production operations to the Willys plant at Toledo, Ohio, where the company continued to build automobiles under the Kaiser marque including the Kaiser Darrin until 1955. Their South American operations continued to build passenger cars well up into the 1960s. The company changed its name to Kaiser Jeep Corporation in 1963.

== History ==
The Kaiser-Frazer Corporation was established in August 1945 as a joint venture between the Henry J. Kaiser Company and Graham-Paige Motors Corporation. Both Henry J. Kaiser, a California-based industrialist, and Joseph W. Frazer, CEO of Graham-Paige, wanted to get into the automobile business and pooled their resources and talents to do so. Less than a year after Kaiser-Frazer's formation, the first Kaiser and Frazer branded automobiles were being produced at the Willow Run, Michigan, headquarters for both Kaiser-Frazer and Graham-Paige. By the end of 1946, over 11,000 cars (total Kaiser and Frazer) were shipped to dealers and distributors, many of which sold to end users. During the summer of 1948, the 300,000th car came off the production line.

In 1950, Kaiser-Frazer began production of a new compact car, the Henry J and ended production of the Frazer automobiles. Both makes were 1951 model year automobiles. In 1952 and 1953, Kaiser-Frazer provided Sears, Roebuck and Company with Allstate-branded automobiles that retailers sold through select Sears Auto Centers. Based on the Henry J models that Kaiser-Frazer dealers were selling, the cars were in the Sears catalog, but the cars could not be purchased by mail order.

At the 1953 New York Auto Show, Kaiser-Frazer announced it would produce a fiberglass-bodied sports car called the Kaiser-Darrin-Frazer 161. The car featured a 161 cu in (2.6 L) straight six-cylinder engine. It was designed by stylist Howard "Dutch" Darrin, who also did the 1947 and 1948 Kaiser and Frazer as well as the 1951 Kaiser automobiles. The vehicle went into production during January 1954. It was sold as the Kaiser Darrin. Production of the Allstate ended in 1953. The last Henry J automobiles were built in late 1953 as 1954 model year cars. The sports car was in production only during the 1954 model year.

While sales were initially strong because of a car-starved public, the company did not have the resources to survive long-term competition with the "Big Three" domestic automakers. The original Kaiser-Frazer design was distinctive and fresh, but the company could not maintain the price point for long-term success. However, the company's problems started as early as 1948. That year, Joseph Frazer resigned as president of Kaiser-Frazer, but stayed in the position as a "lame duck" until April 1949 when Henry J. Kaiser's oldest son, Edgar, took Frazer's place as president. This was partly because Frazer had warned Kaiser not to tool up to produce 200,000 cars for the 1949 model year, realizing they could not compete against the new cars from the Big Three coming out that year. Kaiser did not heed the warning, saying, "The Kaisers never retrench." A total of 58,000 cars were sold that year. The Frazer marque was discontinued after the 1951 models. Joseph Frazer remained a sales consultant and vice-chairman of the Kaiser-Frazer board until 1953.

At the 1953 annual stockholders' meeting, Kaiser-Frazer Corporation's name was changed to Kaiser Motors Corporation by stockholder vote. Shortly before the meeting, Kaiser-Frazer's Kaiser Manufacturing Corporation division worked out a deal to purchase certain assets (and assume certain liabilities) of the Willys-Overland Corporation, makers of Willys cars and Jeep vehicles. After completing the acquisition, Kaiser Manufacturing Corporation changed its name to Willys Motors, Incorporated. During late 1953 and 1954, Kaiser Motors operations at Willow Run Michigan were closed down or moved to the Willys facility in Toledo, Ohio.

Kaiser-Frazer worked out deals with General Motors to purchase GM Hydramatic automatic transmissions and detuned Rocket 88 engines from Oldsmobile, with deliveries starting in the 1952 model year. The deal was contingent on Olds expanding its Lansing, MI, engine production facility. Still, that expansion was canceled due to military needs for the Korean War. K-F had their own V8 engine development program that ran through 1949 but, as the lead engineers on the team stated to the Society of Automotive Engineers (SAE) they found their work was leading down a "blind alley" and would fail.

Due to changing market conditions, Frazer cars were not as competitive as luxury and upper-medium priced models. This was similar to the experience of Hudson and Studebaker during the 1950s. The Henry J, while a reasonable idea, was restricted by the terms of a re-capitalization loan the government made to the company in the fall of 1949. Kaiser-Frazer labor agreements resulted in the company paying the highest wages of any American automaker while having a productivity rate of only 60–65% in return. Kaiser tried to resolve its deficiencies with schemes like elaborate designer interiors with upscale dashboards and upholstery. A line of "Traveler" sedans with the trunk connected to the interior of the car was an improvised attempt at marketing a model to compete with the standard station wagon designs.

The last Kaisers were produced in America during the 1955 model year. Close to 760,000 cars were built of all makes and models between May 1946 and September 1955. At the end of 1955, the Henry J. Kaiser Company management team used Kaiser Motors Corporation to create a new holding company encompassing the various Kaiser industrial activities. Kaiser Motors' name was changed to Kaiser Industries Corporation, and it functioned as a holding company for various Kaiser business holdings, including Willys Motors Incorporated.

While U.S. production of Kaiser and Willys passenger cars ceased in 1955, production of Willys Jeeps in Toledo, Ohio, continued. Kaiser continued automobile production in Argentina under the Industrias Kaiser Argentina (IKA) company established in Santa Isabel, Córdoba and Willys passenger cars moved to Brazil under the Willys-Overland do Brasil company, using the U.S. dies, well into the 1960s.

The company changed its name to Kaiser Jeep in 1963. By 1969, Kaiser Industries decided to leave the auto business, which was sold to American Motors Corporation (AMC) in 1970. As part of the transaction, Kaiser acquired a 22% interest in AMC, which it later divested. Included in the sale was the General Products Division, which Kaiser had purchased from Studebaker in 1964 as Studebaker prepared to leave the auto business. AMC renamed the division AM General. The company continues operations and is best known as the manufacturer of the Humvee and civilian Hummer H1.

== Vehicles ==
- Kaiser, includes Deluxe, Carolina, Traveler, Dragon and Manhattan sedans.
- Frazer includes Standard, Deluxe, and Manhattan sedans, as well as the Vagabond hatchback.
- Henry J, a small economy car including the Corsair and Vagabond.
- Darrin, the first production fiberglass sports car in the USA, beating the Corvette to market by one month. Featured a unique "pocket door" design that made the doors slide into the fender of the car. Only 435 were made for the 1954 model year.
- Willys, including "Aero-Willys" and all sub-trim levels that include the Aero-Lark, Aero Ace, etc.
- Jeep, including Willys MB (military Jeep), pick-up trucks, CJ-5 Jeep (civilian Jeep), and the Wagoneer, and Jeepster marques of all steel wagons.
- Allstate, designed to sell through and by Sears-Roebuck department stores in the southern United States, a slightly restyled Henry J. The cars were equipped with Allstate products (tires, battery, etc.). The modest styling changes distinguishing the Allstate from the Henry J were executed by Alex Tremulis, the co-designer of the 1948 Tucker Sedan.
