= Kaiser Dragon =

Automobile model produced by Kaiser Motors

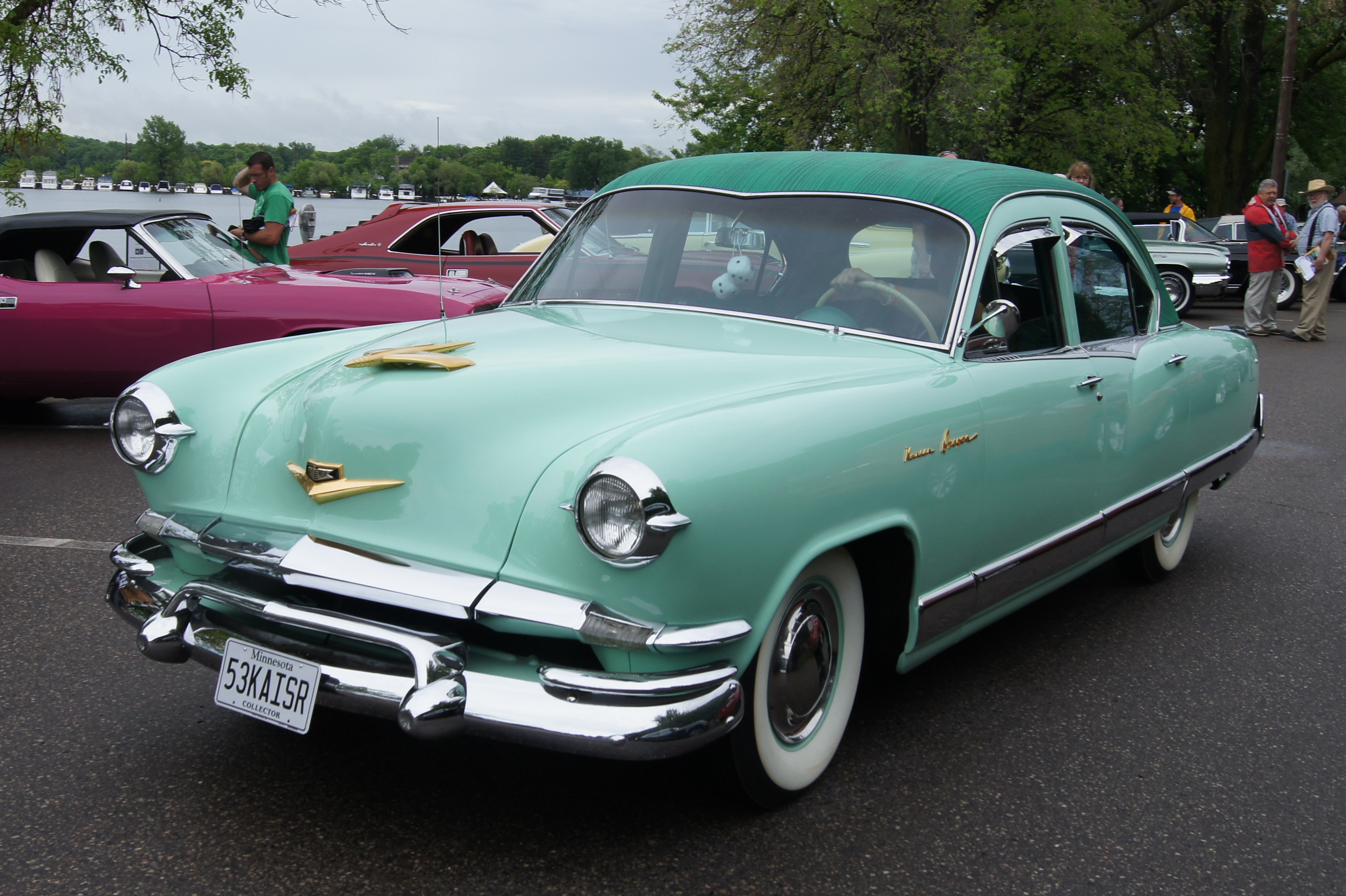
- 1953 Jade Dragon

Overview
- Manufacturer: Kaiser Motors
- Production: 1953

Body and chassis
- Class: Full-size
- Body style: 4-door sedan
- Layout: FR layout

Powertrain
- Engine: 226.2 cu in (3.7 L) "Supersonic", 2-bbl., L-head 118 hp (88 kW) I6 (1953)
- Transmission: 3-speed manual Hydramatic automatic

Dimensions
- Wheelbase: 118.5 in (3,010 mm)
- Length: 211.2 in (5,364 mm)
- Width: 74.0 in (1,880 mm)

The Kaiser Dragon is a car model based on the second-generation Kaiser manufactured by Kaiser Motors in 1953. The dragon name was first used in 1951 for a special trim option on Kaiser cars featuring vinyl upholstery claimed to resemble dragon skin.

== 1951 ==
Kaiser introduced an all-new design by Howard "Dutch" Darrin for the 1951 model year with a longer, lower, and wider body featuring the lowest beltline in U.S. car production at that time. Because Kaiser did not offer a V8 engine it focused marketing against the competition by introducing unique trim package for its Deluxe models in the late fall of 1950. A two-page color advertisement that ran in Life was one of the ways the 1951 Kaisers were announced with their redesigned bodies and a new vinyl upholstery option. The upholstery was named "Dragon skin" instead of alligator so customers would not think that it was real alligator skin. The cars also featured thick carpeting.

There was also the second series of cars named for their color (i.e. Mariner Gray was called "Silver Dragon"). The trim was available with a padded vinyl roof, which had a different texture than the interior, and was called "Dinosaur." The last series came only in Tropical Green and were called "Jade Dragons". This option was an extra US$125 (equivalent to $1,550 in 2025).

The dragon name was not used during the 1952 model year.

== 1953 ==
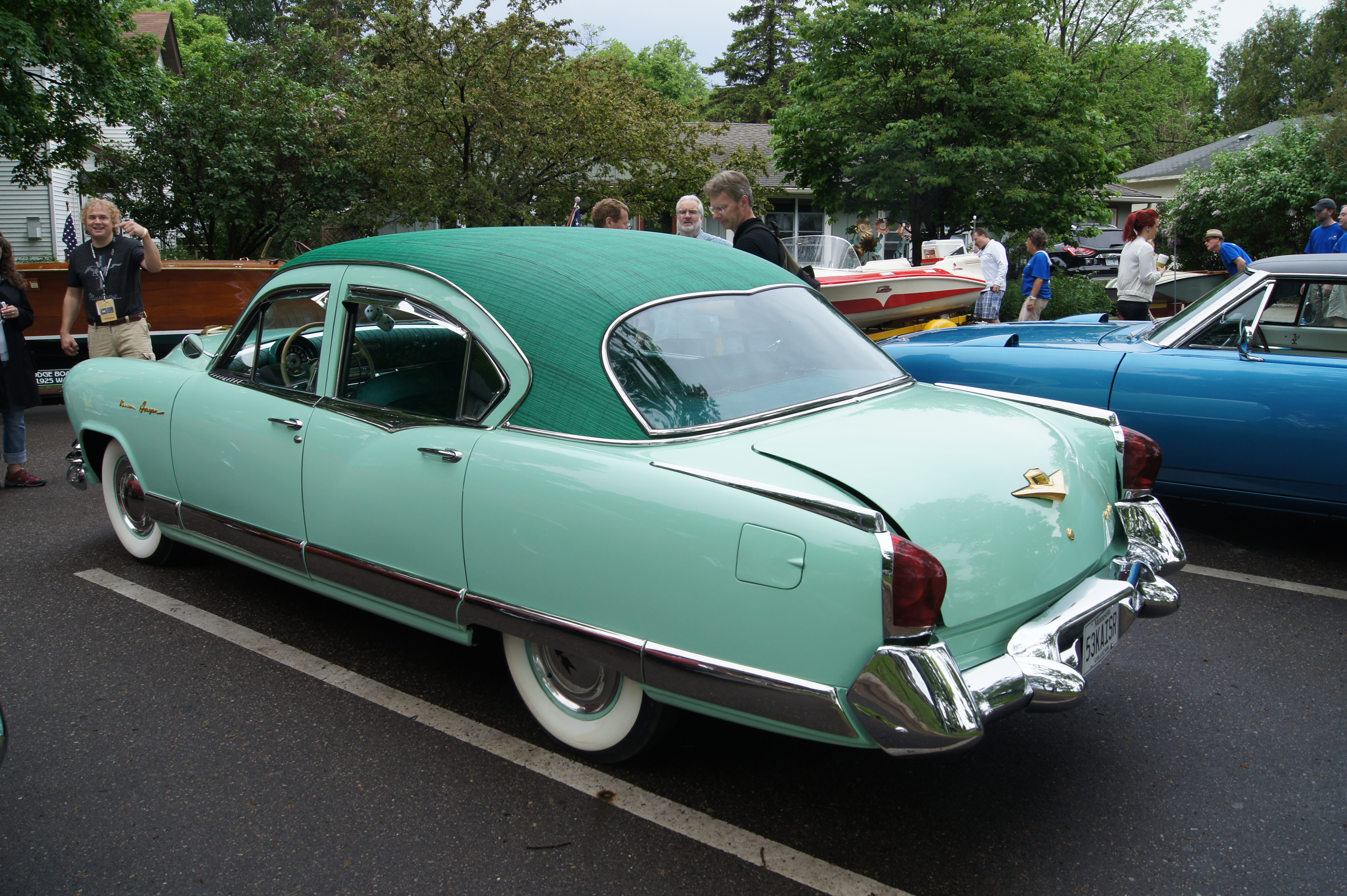
1953 Kaiser Jade Dragon rear view

The Kaiser Dragon model was introduced on 31 October 1952, for the 1953 model year. This time, the Dragon was a separate model, not a trim option, positioned above the "Manhattan." The special upholstery and padded roof now featured a grass-patterned "Bambu" vinyl and heavy-duty Belgian linen "Laguna" cloth with overlapping patterns.

Available only as four-door sedans, these cars were upscale in addition to the special trim. Standard equipment included Hydramatic automatic transmission, power steering, electric clock, radio with rear speaker, front and rear center armrests, numerous courtesy lamps, heater, tinted glass, 14-karat gold plated hood ornament and fender nameplates, interior trim (including a nameplate on the glove box door that was personalized with the owner's name), and padding in the glove box. The Dragon models provided for a luxury feel with "almost 200 pounds (91 kg) of insulation to quiet the ride and give it a sense of additional heft." Front leg room was 45.1 in (1,146 mm), with rear leg room at 39.5 in (1,003 mm). Dragons were built in three batches during 1953 with those made after about February included the wire wheels. The initial production included black lacquer with a black bamboo roof, but complaints about swirls in the finish of the approximately 20 black cars were made, this color option was discontinued.

Safety features were built in so Kaiser called it "the world's first safety first car". This claim was made even though the Tucker 48, a car known for unique features, including built-in safety features, came out five years earlier. Among the standard Dragon features were a full padded dash and recessed instruments, an extra-large and pop-out windshield, a low center of gravity, steering designed for better control, as well as brakes with "more stopping power" and special lighting for better visibility at night.

These cars were expensive for the time at US$3,924 (equivalent to $47,220 in 2025). It was more than a V8-powered Cadillac Series 62. A comparable 1953 Buick Roadmaster was priced at $3,358 and came with 188 hp (140 kW) 322 cu in (5.3 L) V8 compared to the Dragon's 118 hp (88 kW) 226.2 cu in (3.7 L) I6 engine. Along with being more expensive, Dragon's 0-60 mph time was slower at 15 seconds. However, the Dragon achieved the best in class 21 mpg_{‑US} (11 L/100 km; 25 mpg_{‑imp}) in the 1953 Mobil Economy Run.

A total of 1,277 Dragons were sold. The small domestic automakers were affected by the Korean War because government controls on materials prevented them from offsetting losses with military production. After controls were removed in March 1953, managers at Ford wanted to out-produce Chevrolet, and a sales war among the "Big Three" (General Motors, Ford, and Chrysler) to increase their market share further compounded problems for all the small automakers.
