= Efraim Ilin =

Israeli tycoon and security expert

Efraim Ilin (Hebrew: אפרים אילין; 1912–2011) was an Israeli tycoon and security expert. He is known for founding Kaiser in Israel.

== Early life ==
Ilin was born in Kharkov, Russian Empire (today Kharkiv, Ukraine). He grew up with Zionist upbringing and spoke Hebrew from the age of 6. In 1925 his family emigrated to Mandatory Palestine, settling in Ness Ziona. Ilin studied at the Herzliya Hebrew Gymnasium. In 1934 he married his wife Ziporah.

== Security career ==
In 1938 Ilin was drafted by Avraham Stern to volunteer in the Irgun. He worked with Stern and David Raziel who was one of its founding members. In 1948, together with Ehud Avriel, Ilin, who was then living in Milan, negotiated a deal with Czechoslovakia to supply arms for the IDF. In 1948 Ilin also negotiated an arms equipment deal with Levi Eshkol and the Yugoslavians on behalf of the Mossad.

== Financial career ==
In 1945 Ilin helped Max Cukier and Avram Goldstein to contract to buy Egyptian cotton to be spun in Italy for re-export to Palestine and became their junior partner.

In 1948, after the founding of the State of Israel, the Ford Motor Company sought to invest in Israel and facilitate the large number of vehicles it would need for the military and government. After threats of boycotts from the Arab nations, Ford backed down.

While the government was searching for alternatives, Lord Marcus Sieff of London, put Ilin in contact with Hickman Price of Kaiser-Frazer. Kaiser had recently built an automobile plant in the Netherlands, and were planning to build an additional one in Greece. Ilin met Price and the two agreed to begin a $2.5 million project. Kaiser-Frazer was prepared to invest half a million dollars and it would be Ilin's responsibility to invest the other two million dollars. In 1950, Ilin, who was unsure if the investment would be successful, traveled to Brooklyn, N.Y. to meet Rabbi Menachem M. Schneerson for advice on the matter. Schneerson urged Ilin to provide the two million needed to bring the deal to fruition, telling Ilin that the new car company would boost the Israeli economy and provide jobs for Israeli citizens, Holocaust survivors and new immigrants. Schneerson told Ilin the deal would be successful.

Kaiser was opened in Israel in 1951.

The factory in Israel built Kaiser-Frazer products, along with Mack trucks, under license. By 1956, Kaiser-Fraizer was responsible for 28% of Israeli exports. By the end of the 1950s, the operation was known as Kaiser-Ilin, named after Ilin.

In 1959, Kaiser-Ilin reached an agreement to assemble six-cylinder Studebaker Larks in Haifa, to help potential buyers bypass stiff Israeli duties on imported vehicles. Earlier that year, the Kaiser-Frazer plant at Haifa laid off 400 workers and suspended operations for two weeks because of a lack of parts.
