= David Raziel =

Irgun leader (1910–1941)

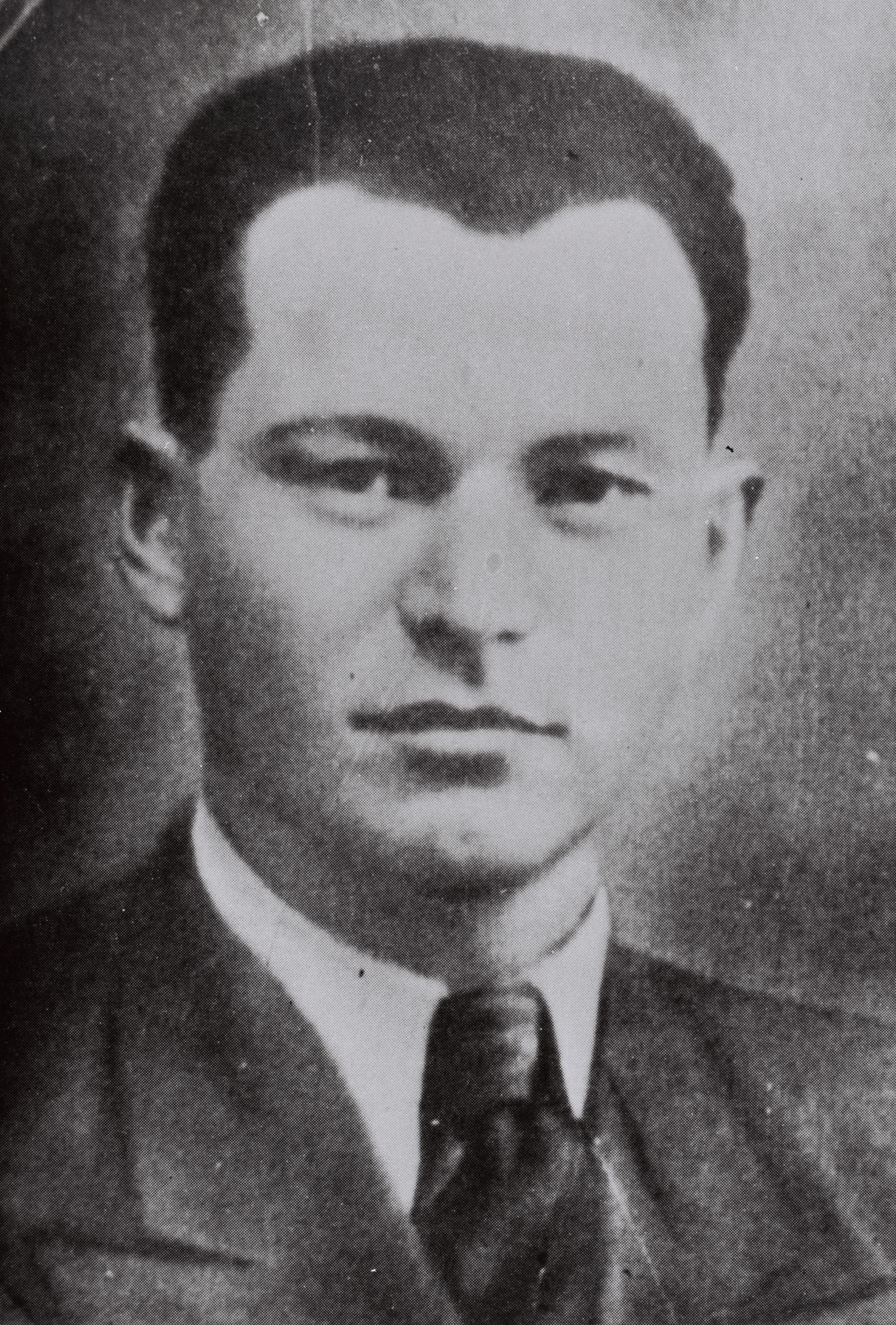
- Native name: דוד רזיאל
- Born: 19 December 1910; Smargon, Vilna Governorate, Russian Empire
- Died: 20 May 1941 (aged 30) Habbaniyah, Kingdom of Iraq
- Buried: Jerusalem
- Allegiance: Haganah; Irgun
- Conflicts: World War II: Anglo-Iraqi War †
- Spouse: Shoshana

David Raziel (Hebrew: דוד רזיאל; 19 December 1910 – 20 May 1941) was a leader of the Zionist underground in British Mandatory Palestine and one of the founders of the Irgun.

During World War II, Irgun entered a truce with the British so they could collaborate in the fight against "the Hebrew's greatest enemy in the world – German Nazism". Raziel was released from prison after agreeing to work with the British. He was killed in action in Iraq in 1941.

== Biography ==
David Rozenson (later Raziel) was born in Smarhon in the Russian Empire. In 1914, when he was three, his family immigrated to Ottoman Palestine, where his father taught at Tachkemoni, a religious school in Tel Aviv. During World War I, the family was exiled to Egypt by the Turks due to their Russian citizenship. They returned to Mandatory Palestine in 1923.

After graduation from Tachkemoni, he studied for several years at Yeshivat Mercaz HaRav in Jerusalem. He was a regular study partner of Rabbi Zvi Yehuda Kook, son and ideological successor to the Rosh Yeshiva and Chief Rabbi of Israel, Rabbi Abraham Isaac Kook.

When the 1929 Hebron massacre broke out, he joined the Haganah in Jerusalem, where he was studying philosophy and mathematics at the Hebrew University of Jerusalem.

His sister, Esther Raziel-Naor, became a member of the Knesset for Herut, the party founded by Irgun leader Menachem Begin.

== Military career ==
When the Irgun was established, Raziel was one of its first members. In 1937, he was appointed by the Irgun as the first Commander of the Jerusalem District and, a year later, Commander in Chief of the Irgun. His term as leader was marked by violence against Arabs, including a sequence of marketplace bombings. Some of those attacks were in response to Arab violence, although they did not target the specific perpetrators of this violence, as had been the case under the policy of Havlagah. Dozens of Arabs were killed in the attacks and hundreds more were maimed. Raziel worked in the Irgun with Avraham Stern, Hanoch Kalai, and Efraim Ilin. On 6 July 1938, 21 Arabs were killed and 52 wounded by a bomb in a Haifa market; on 25 July a second market bomb in Haifa killed at least 39 Arabs and injured 70; a bomb in Jaffa's vegetable market on 26 August killed 24 Arabs and wounded 39. The attacks were condemned by the Jewish Agency.

On 19 May 1939, Raziel was captured by the British and sent to Acre Prison.

After the 1941 Iraqi coup d'état, British called on assistance from the Irgun, after General Percival Wavell had Raziel, an Irgun commander, released from custody at Acre Prison. They asked him if he would undertake to kill or kidnap Amin al-Husseini, the Mufti, and destroy Iraq's oil refineries. Raziel agreed on condition that he be allowed to kidnap the Mufti. On 17 May 1941, he was sent to Iraq with three of his comrades, including Ya'akov Meridor and Jacob Sika Aharoni, on behalf of the British army to help defeat the Rashid Ali al-Gaylani pro-Axis revolt in the Anglo-Iraqi War. On 20 May, a Luftwaffe plane strafed near Habbaniyah the car in which he was traveling, killing Raziel and a British officer Major Patrick H. Freke Evans. Meridor returned to Palestine and took over command of the Irgun, while Jacob Sika Aharoni commanded missions that led to the British entry into Iraq and the saving of the Jewish community following the Farhud pogrom.

In 1955, Raziel's remains were exhumed and transferred to Cyprus, and again in 1961 to Jerusalem's Mount Herzl military cemetery.

== Commemoration ==
Ramat Raziel, a moshav in the Judaean Mountains, is named after Raziel, as well as many streets in Israel bearing his name in commemoration. The Israel postal service issued a stamp in his honor. There is a high-school in Herzliya named after him.
