= Kaiser-Frazer =

American automobile company

- Industry: Automotive
- Founded: 1945; 81 years ago
- Founder: Henry J. Kaiser; Joseph W. Frazer
- Defunct: 1953; 73 years ago
- Fate: Merged to Willys-Overland
- Successor: Kaiser Jeep
- Headquarters: U.S.
- Key people: Edgar F. Kaiser
- Products: Automobiles

The Kaiser-Frazer Corporation (1947–1953 as Kaiser-Frazer) was an American automobile company. It was founded jointly by industrialist Henry J. Kaiser and automobile executive Joseph W. Frazer. In 1947, the company acquired the automotive assets of Graham-Paige, of which Frazer had become president near the end of World War II. Kaiser-Frazer was one of a few US automakers to achieve success after World War II, if only for a few years. Joseph W. Frazer left the company in 1949, replaced as president by Henry's son, Edgar F. Kaiser.

In 1953, Kaiser bought the ailing Willys-Overland company, mainly for its Jeep brand, and merged the Kaiser and Willys operations under the "Kaiser-Willys Corporation". The Willys-Overland branch was renamed "Willys Motors", until ten years later, in 1963, it was renamed Kaiser Jeep.

== History ==
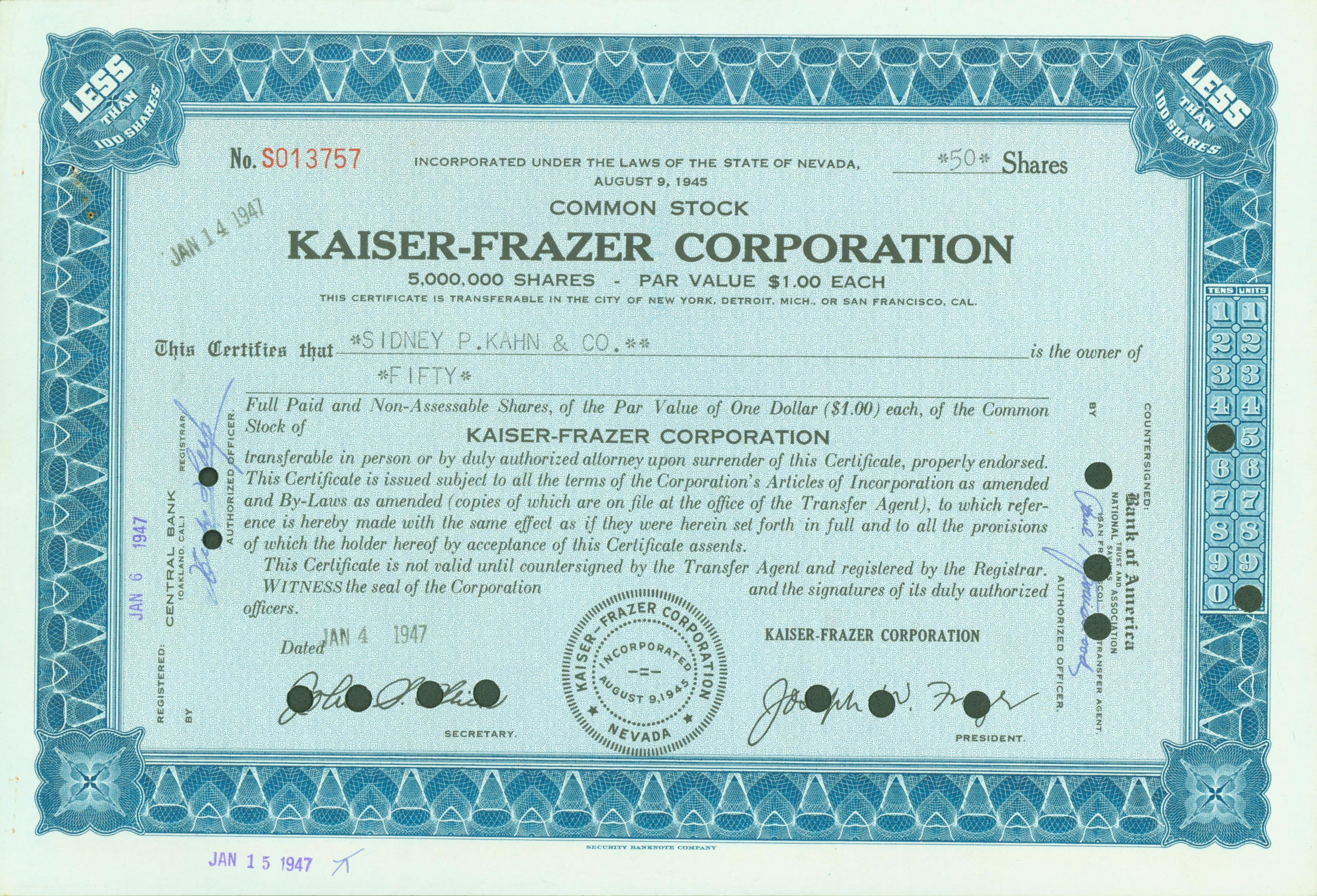
Fifty shares of the Kaiser-Frazer Corp., issued 4. January 1947

The company was founded on 25 July 1945, and in 1946 Kaiser-Frazer displayed prototypes of their two new cars at the Waldorf Astoria Hotel in New York City. The Kaiser had an advanced front-wheel drive design, while the Frazer was an upscale, conventional rear-wheel drive car. However, production costs and development time constraints prevented the front-wheel drive design from entering production, so the new 1947 model year Kaiser and Frazer sedans shared their bodies and power-trains. Being some of the first newly designed cars on the market while the "Big Three" were still marketing their pre-war designs, the Kaisers and Frazers made an exciting entrance. Kaiser and Frazer continued to share bodies and engines through 1950 with different exterior and interior trim.

Henry Kaiser had no automotive marketing experience, but Joseph Frazer had held positions with Packard, GM, Chrysler, and Willys-Overland. Kaiser believed in pressing forward in the face of adversity, while Frazer was more pragmatic. As the market for Kaiser-Frazer products slowed in 1949 with the introduction of new designs from the Big Three, Kaiser pushed to increase production, creating an oversupply that took until mid-1950 to sell. Kaiser and Frazer had repeated disagreements over production until, finally, Joseph Frazer left the company in 1951 and the Frazer nameplate was dropped after a short 10,000 unit production run in 1951 that used up the remaining inventory of the 1949–50 bodies.

In 1953, the Kaiser-Frazer Corporation was renamed Kaiser Motors Corporation and continued building passenger cars through 1955. In 1955 Kaiser Motors Corporation had another name change to Kaiser Industries when it became a holding company for the major assets of the Henry J. Kaiser Company. The business then established a very broad base of activities, including a group of television stations.

In 1953, Kaiser bought the Willys-Overland company for US$63,381,175 and merged the Kaiser and Willys operations under the name Kaiser-Willys Corporation. The company left the passenger car market at the end of the 1955 model year.

By 1956, Willys Motors built only utility vehicles, many for export, and was turning a healthy profit as a company 100% owned by Kaiser Industries Corporation. This operation (which included stakes in Willys-Overland du Brasil and Industrias Kaiser Argentina) became Kaiser Jeep Corporation in 1963 and remained 100% owned by Kaiser Industries. In 1970 Kaiser-Jeep Corporation was sold to American Motors Corporation through purchase of certain assets and assumption of certain liabilities by AMC. In 1987 American Motors was sold to the Chrysler Corporation in a lock-stock-barrel (acquiring all assets and assuming all liabilities of American Motors) transaction.

== Production ==
Production of Kaiser-Frazer (K-F) models was centered at Willow Run, Michigan, then the world's largest building. It was built by the U.S. government just prior to World War II for Henry Ford to make B-24 Liberator bombers. When the war ended Ford had no interest in the facility, and the War Assets Administration searched for a lessee or buyer. K-F expressed interest in the facility and the WAA offered them an attractive five-year lease rate. K-F also had manufacturing facilities in Jefferson MI; Long Beach CA; Portland OR; Leaside, Ontario, Canada; Haifa, Israel; Kawasaki, Japan; Mexico City and Rotterdam (known as "Nekaf", for Nederlandse Kaiser-Frazer fabrieken). U.S. production was concentrated at Toledo, Ohio, upon the purchase of Willys-Overland starting in 1953; the Willow Run facility was sold to General Motors after GM suffered a disastrous fire at their Livonia, Michigan, Hydramatic automatic transmission plant and needed a facility quickly to resume production.

== Brands and products ==
- Kaiser includes Custom, Deluxe, Virginian, Carolina and Manhattan sedans, as well as the Traveler and Vagabond 3 door hatchback utility sedan. First post-war production car to offer supercharging (the 1954 Kaiser Manhattan).
- Henry J, a small economy car including Corsair and Vagabond.
- Darrin, the first production fiberglass sports car in the United States, beating the Corvette to market by one month.
- Frazer includes Standard, Deluxe, and Manhattan sedans and the Vagabond hatchback. The 1951 Frazer Manhattan convertible was the last four-door American convertible until the 1961 Lincoln Continental. Early production 1947 Frazers were marketed and identified as a Graham-Paige product.
- Willys, including "Aero-Willys" and all sub-trim levels include Aero-Lark, Aero Ace.
- Jeep, including pick-ups, CJ Vehicles, all steel wagons, Wagoneer and Jeepster models.
- Allstate, designed to sell through Sears & Roebuck department stores in the southern United States, was a slightly restyled Henry J. The cars were equipped with Allstate products (tires, battery, etc.). The modest styling changes distinguishing the Allstate from the Henry J were executed by Alex Tremulis, stylist of the 1948 Tucker Sedan.
- Kaiser-Frazer also produced the C-119 "Flying Boxcar" airplane under license from Fairchild; they were produced at Willow Run from 1951 to 1955. They produced 71 Flying Boxcars, although Fairchild did not like Kaiser-Frazer producing them. They blocked Kaiser-Frazer from purchasing the Pratt & Whitney R-4360 engines, so Kaiser-Frazer purchased the Wright 3350 duplex cyclone engines since Wright had an abundance of them from the decommissioning of the B-29 bomber.

== Gallery ==
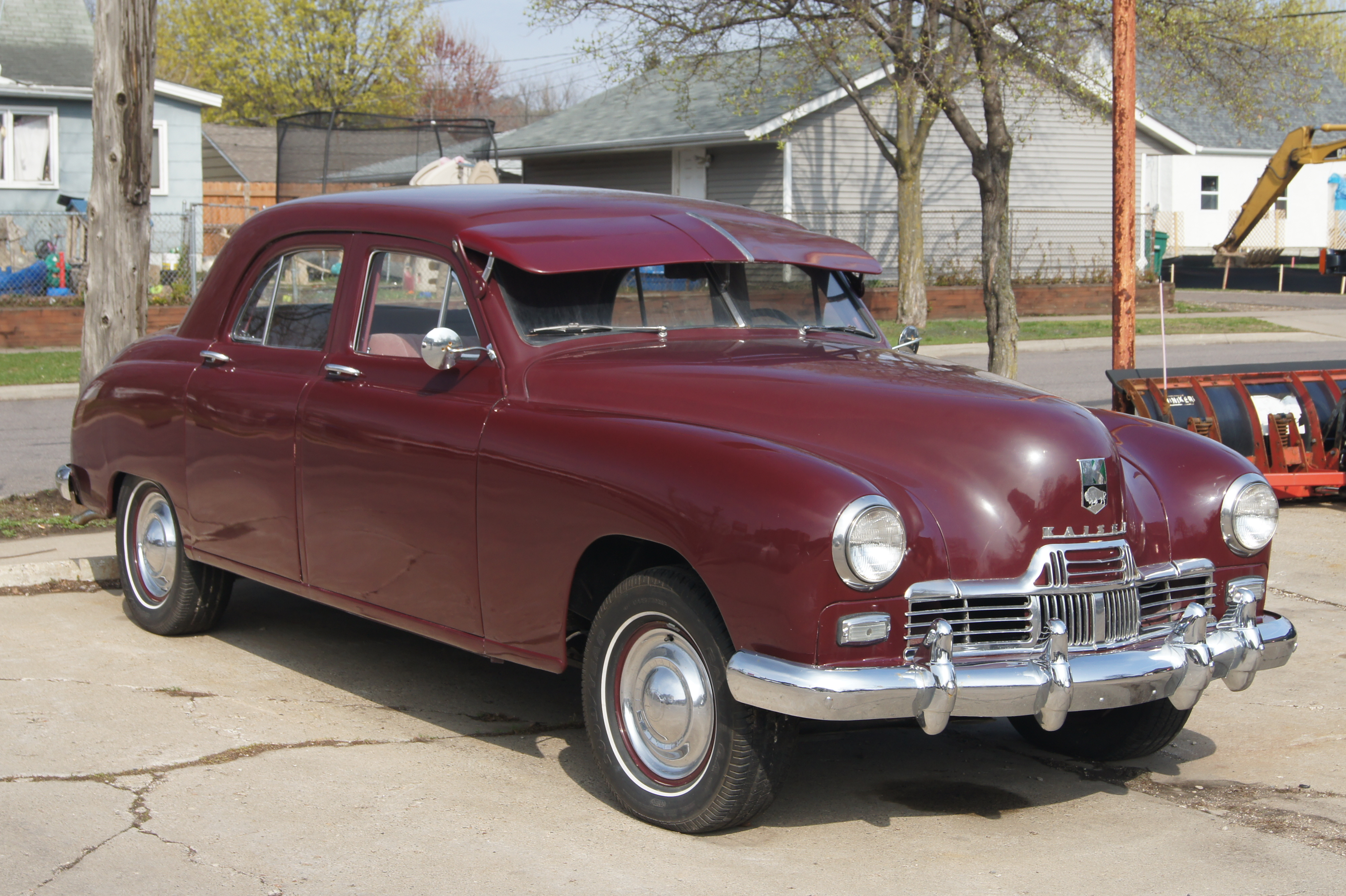
1948 Kaiser Special Sedan

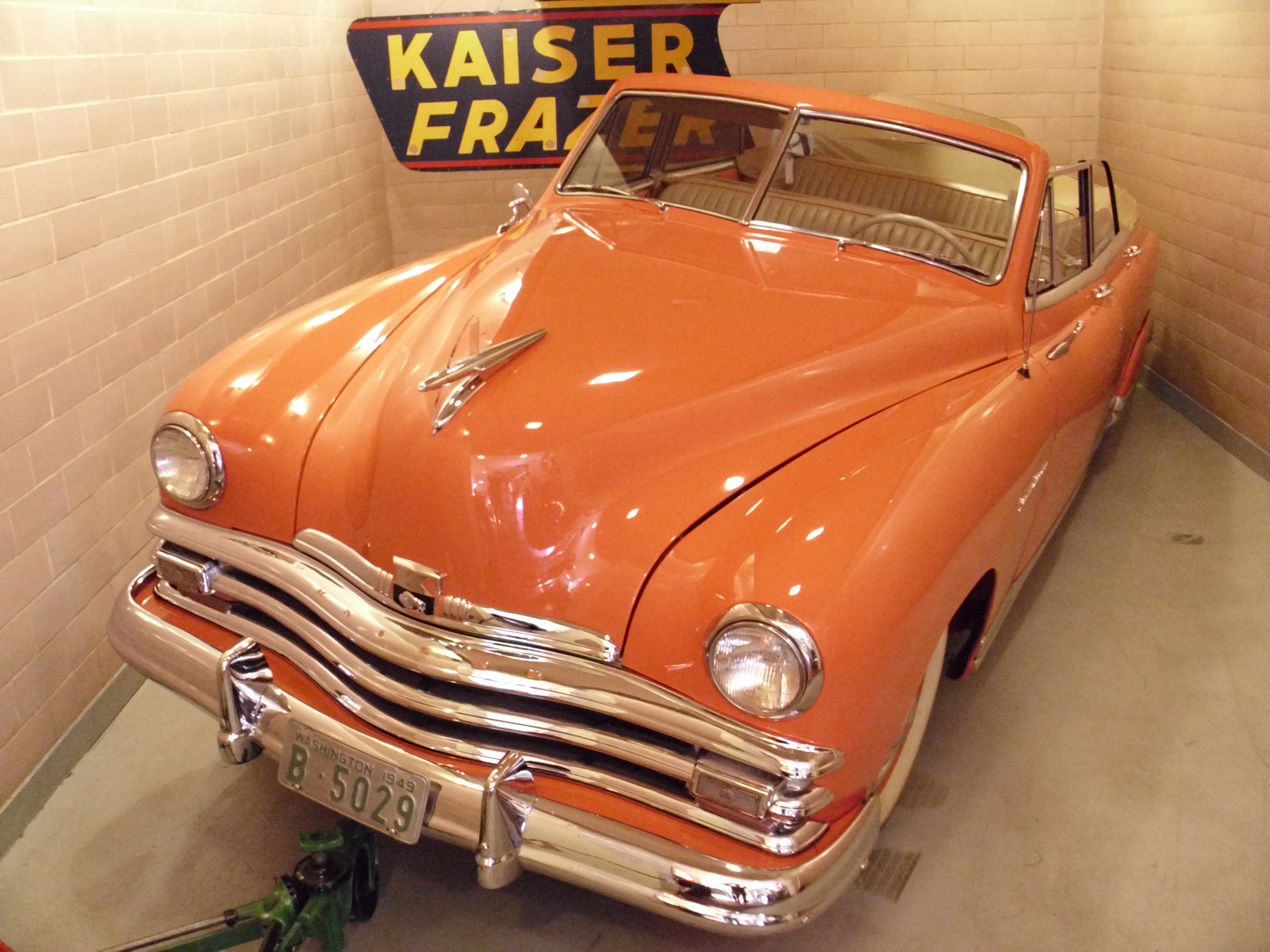
1949 Kaiser Deluxe 4-Door Convertible at the LeMay Family Collection

1949 Frazer Manhattan 4-Door Convertible

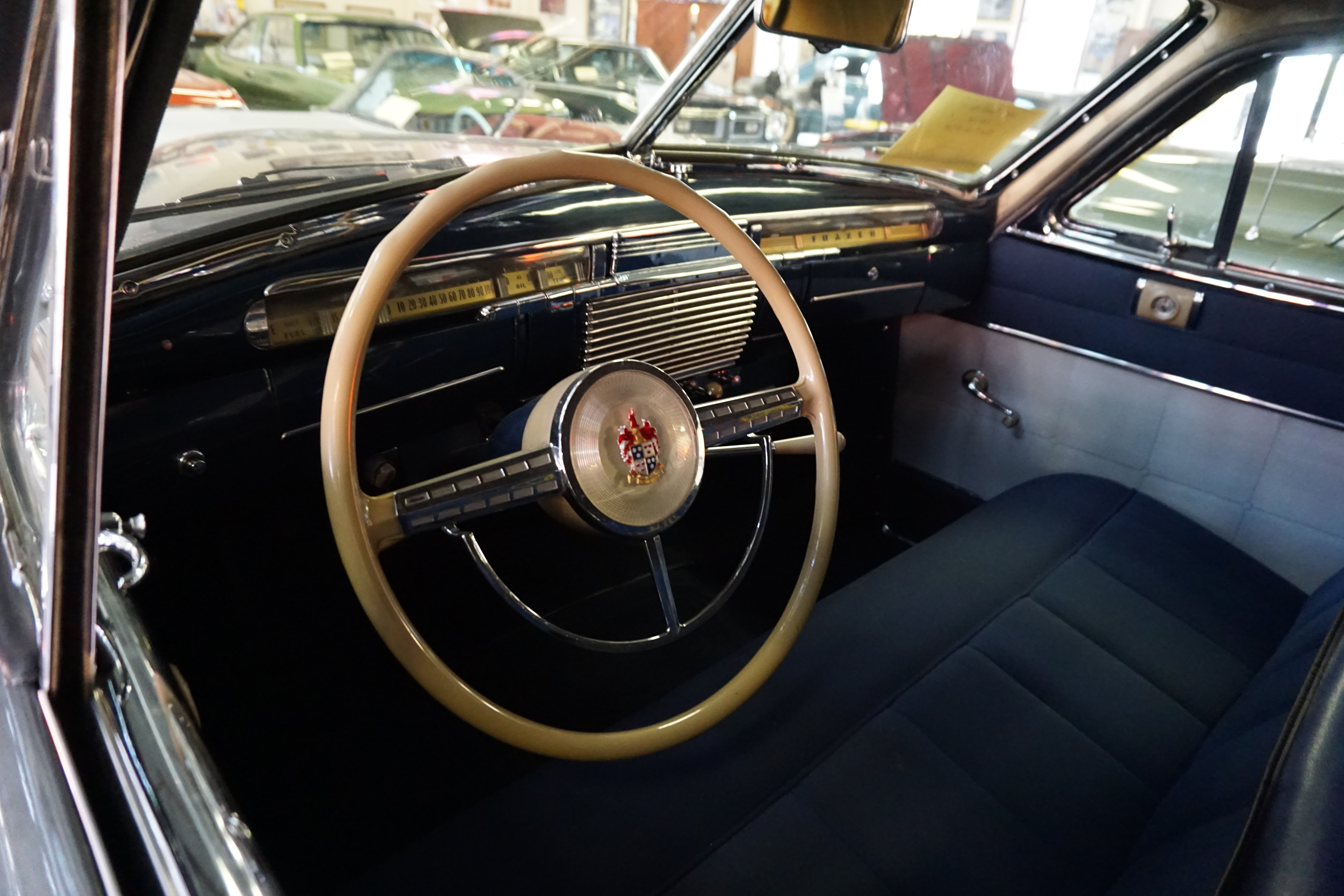
1947 Frazer Manhattan interior

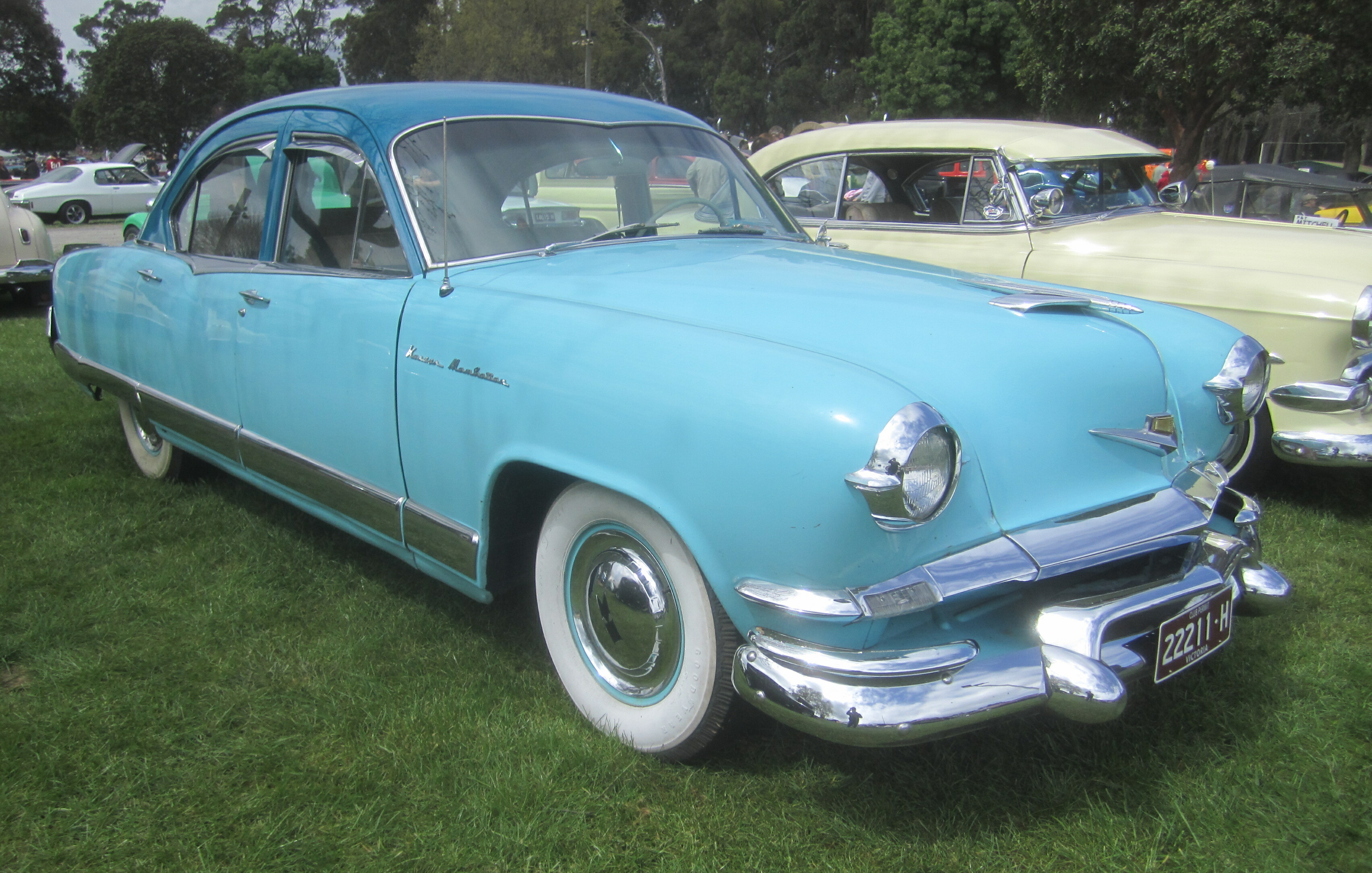
1953 Kaiser Manhattan 4-Door Sedan

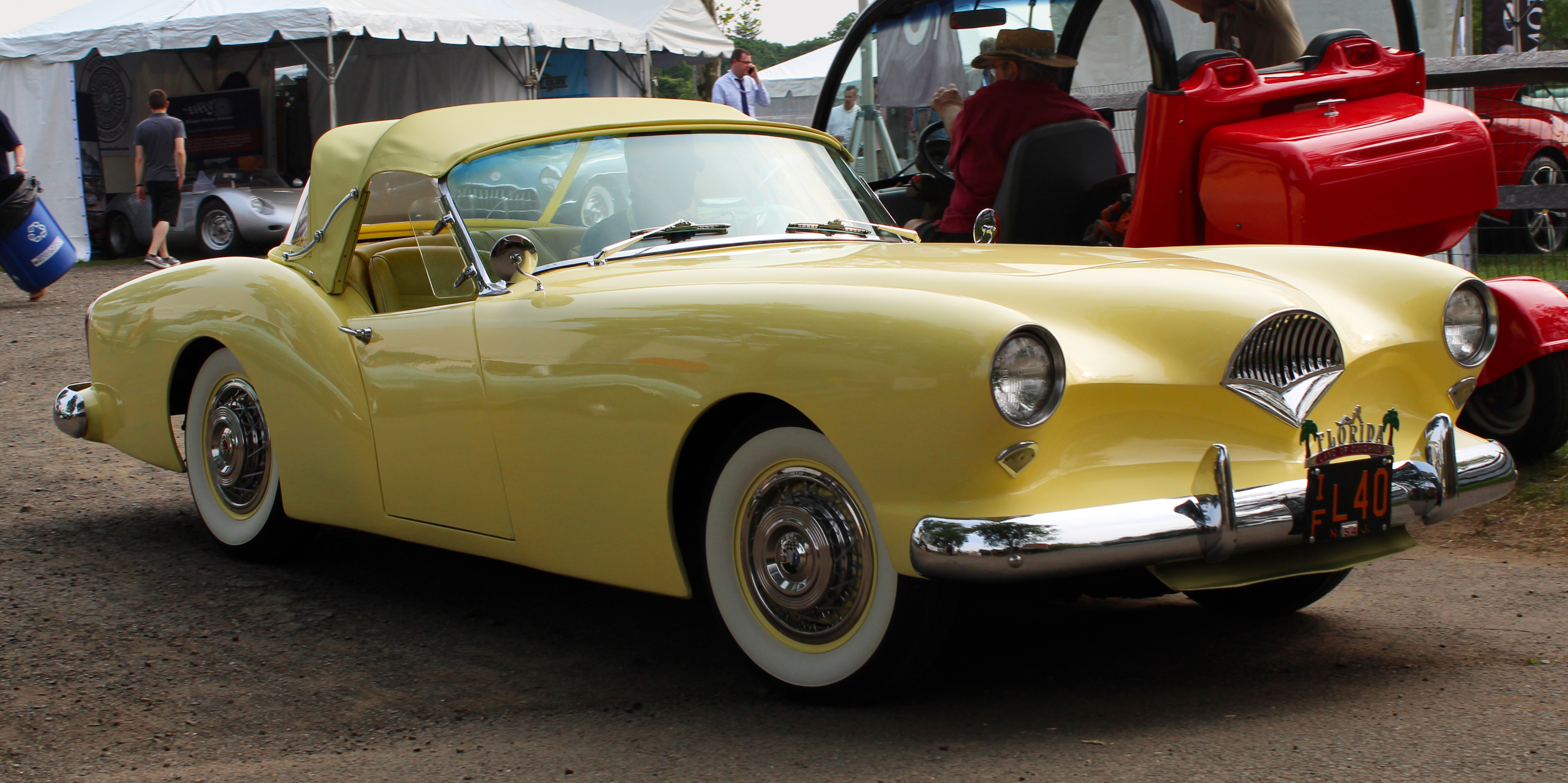
1954 Kaiser Darrin

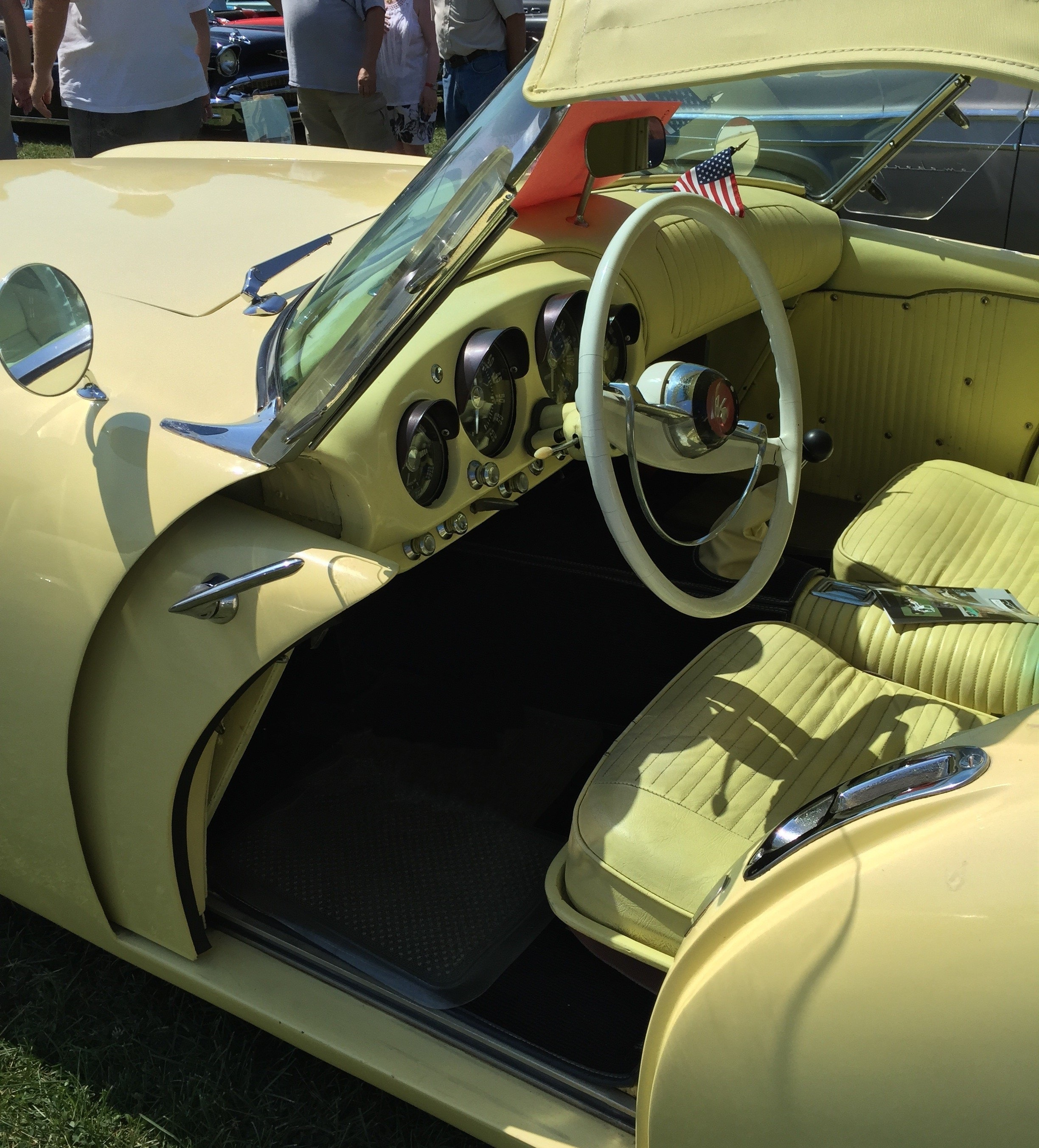
1954 Kaiser Darrin with the driver's door open, showing the unique door design which slides into the front fender

== International operations ==
=== Argentina ===
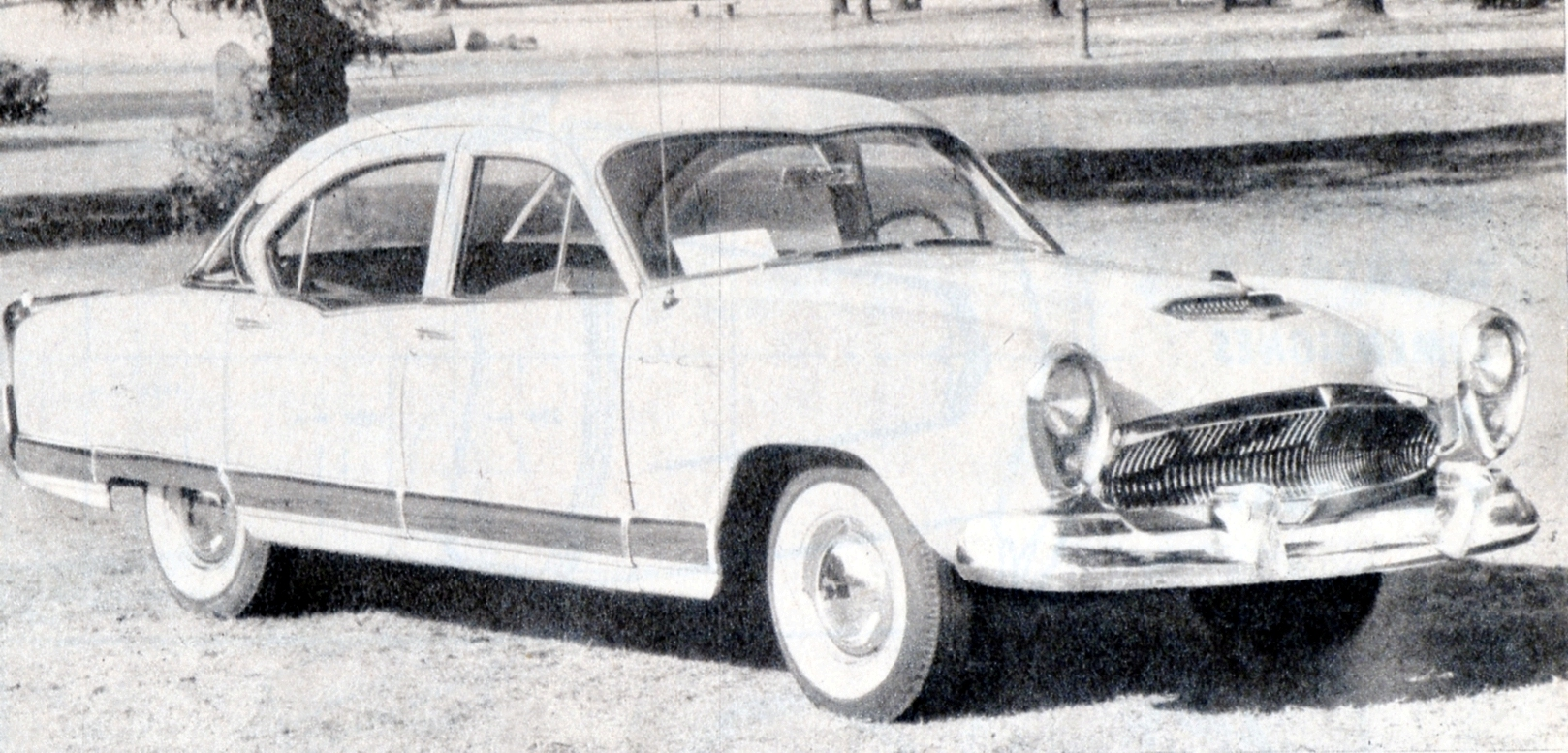
Kaiser Carabela (local name given to Kaiser Manhattan) manufactured in Argentina, 1962

In 1951, Argentina sent their emissary, Brigadier General Juan Ignacio San Martín, to the US to convince an auto manufacturer to build cars in Argentina. In 1954, Kaiser was the only one to accept the offer, with the remainder believing the market was too small to justify the investment. Also, they did not have the rugged products Kaiser did. On January 19, 1955, Kaiser and the government of Argentina signed an agreement to permit Kaiser to manufacture automobiles and trucks in Argentina. In February, Kaiser created a wholly owned subsidiary named Kaiser Automotores, the holding company which in turn owned part of the newly created Industrias Kaiser Argentina S.A. (IKA), the manufacturing and marketing arm. Other partners in IKA included the government-owned vehicle manufacturer Industrias Aeronáuticas y Mecánicas del Estado (IAME) and private investors. In August, Kaiser applied for and received an import license to bring in 1,021 completed cars, manufacturing equipment and spare parts from the US. Groundbreaking for the new factory was in March 1955 with the first Jeep vehicle rolling out of the plant on 27 April 1956.

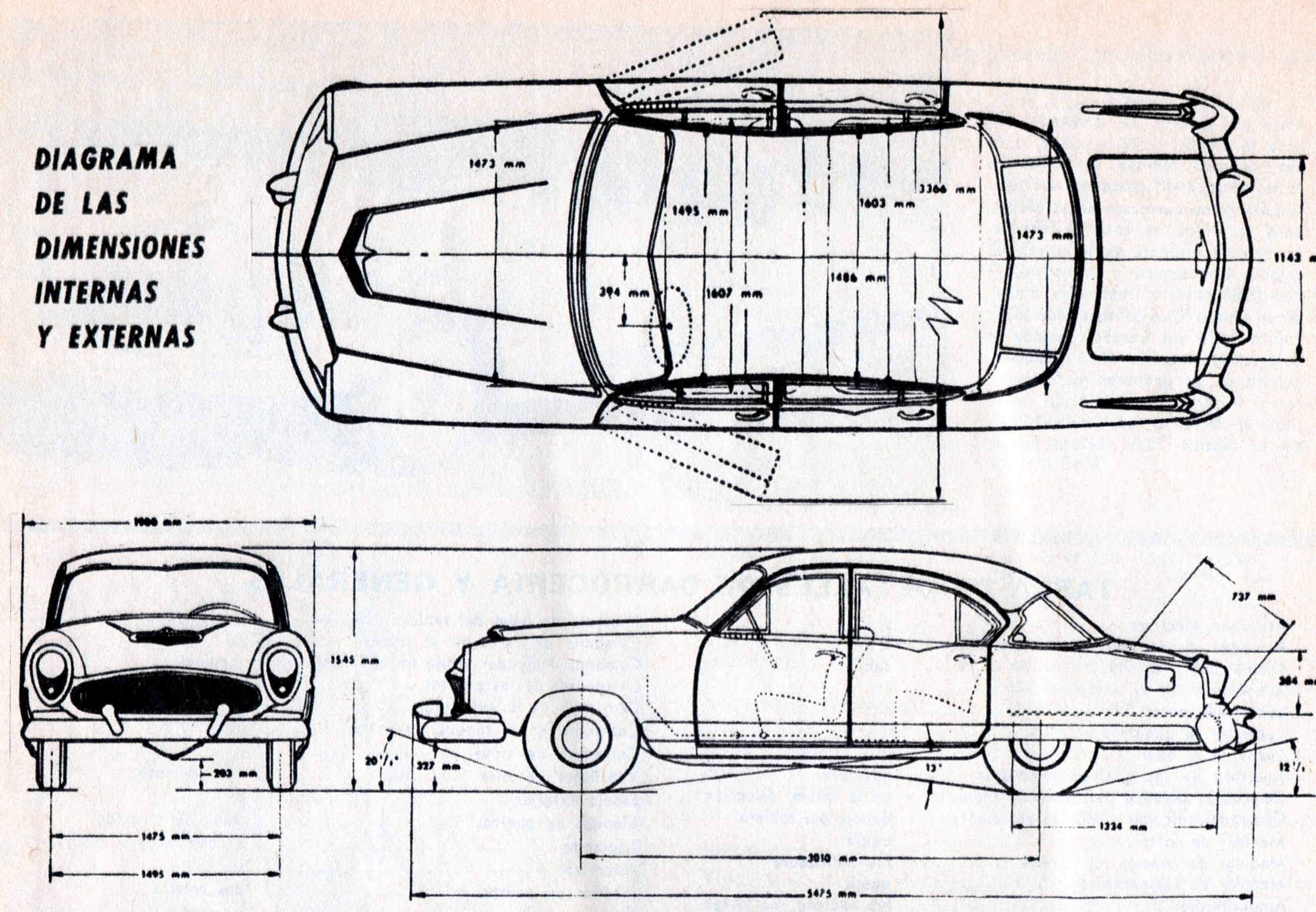
Diagram of the Carabela's measurements

The new Argentine factory was built in the city of Santa Isabel in the province of Córdoba with the Kaiser Manhattan being rechristened the "Kaiser Carabela" — named after a type of Portuguese sailing ship. The US vinyl and fabric interior was replaced with a more rugged leather interior, the speedometer was recalibrated in kilometers with the temperature, oil, and fuel gauge annotations in Spanish and the spring rates were increased to accommodate unimproved Argentine roads. Oddly, the dash castings with annotations for vent, heater, headlight and wiper controls remained in English. No consideration was given to offering an automatic transmission due to the anticipated difficulty in obtaining service in remote towns. Production started on the Carabela on 25 July 1958 and, in the remaining months of that year, 2,158 cars were built. IKA was also building Jeep vehicles at the Cordoba factory and assembled 20,454 Jeeps in 1958 alone. The combined Carabela-Jeep production of 22,612 units was 81 percent of all vehicles manufactured in Argentina in 1958, with the only competition being the state-run utility vehicle manufacturer IAME. Many have questioned the wisdom of building IKA automobile factory in remote Santa Isabel which was far from ports and transportation hubs but the primary reason is that Córdoba was General San Martín's home province and he had a close, influential relationship with President Juan Perón.

In 1962, the Carabela, the "Gran coche argentino" (the Great Argentine Car), ended production with some 15,000 cars assembled providing elegant transportation for the doctors, bankers and other notables in Argentina. The Carabela had some stable mates in 1960-62 in the form of an Alfa Romeo 1900 sedan derivative named the Bergantín (another type of Spanish sailing ship) and an Argentine-manufactured Renault Dauphine (badged IKA Dauphine). In 1962, Rambler variants licensed from AMC would replace the Carabela and the Bergantín. The final form of the AMC variants was the Torino, which saw a lot of racing on international circuits. Built until the early 1980s, the Torino was based on the 1964 Rambler American 2-door hardtop and 4-door sedan, but had its own engine, front and rear end styling, and a more European-styled interior. In 1970, Kaiser sold IKA to Renault.

=== Israel ===
With the founding of the State of Israel in 1948, the Ford Motor Company sought to invest in the new state, and to facilitate the production of a large number of vehicles Israel would need for the military and the government. Ford announced plans to build an assembly plant in Israel.

When Arab nations got word of Ford’s plans, they announced that if Ford didn't cancel the agreement, they’d boycott it by putting the company on the Arab League’s blacklist.

Ford pulled out causing a moment of crisis for the Israeli government. While the government was searching for alternatives, Lord Marcus Sieff of London, contacted Efraim Ilin, an Israeli security expert and tycoon, and put him in contact with Hickman Price of Kaiser-Frazer. The company had recently built an automobile plant in Holland, and were planning to build one in Greece. Ilin met Price and negotiated a $2.5 million project. Kaiser-Frazer invested half a million dollars, and Ilin formed a group that invested the other two million dollars.

Kaiser production began in Israel in 1951. By 1955, Kaiser-Frazer was responsible for 20% of Israeli industrial exports, with 90% of the output from their Israeli factory exported.

The factory built Kaiser-Frazer products, along with Mack trucks, under license. By the end of the 1950s, the operation was known as Kaiser-Ilin, named after Efraim Ilin, the Israeli entrepreneur who had negotiated the Haifa plant deal with Hickman Price Jr., the nephew of Joseph P. Frazer. In 1959, Kaiser-Ilin reached an agreement to assemble six-cylinder Studebaker Larks in Haifa, to help potential buyers bypass stiff Israeli duties on imported vehicles. Earlier that year, the Kaiser-Frazer plant at Haifa laid off 400 workers and suspended operations for two weeks because of a lack of parts.

=== Netherlands ===
In 1947, the Dutch company Nederlandse Kaiser-Frazer Fabrieken (NEKAF) was created with a new factory constructed in Rotterdam. NEKAF assembled 6,000 1949 Kaiser knock-down kits imported from the US using some local content (batteries, tires, interior, carpets, glass) and ignition and electrical system parts from France and Great Britain. Kaiser cars were assembled through 1954 with NEKAF exporting to Europe, South America and the Middle East.

US-built Jeep vehicles were imported into The Netherlands by S.A. Ateliers de La Dyle under an agreement with Willys Overland. Once Willys was purchased by Kaiser, the Willys agreement was transferred to NEKAF. In March 1954, assembly of the Jeep CJ-3B started and was followed by the FC-150, FC-170, the pickup truck, station wagon, CJ-5 and DJ-3A. On 21 January 1955, NEKAF signed a contract with the Royal Netherlands Army to supply 4,000 M38A1 jeeps with the first delivery to the army on 28 May of the same year. The vehicles were knock down kits imported from the US with some local content as with the 1949 Kaiser assembly. NEKAF delivered an additional 1,624 vehicles to the army through 1959 until production was taken over by Kemper & Van Twist Diesel who delivered another 2,237 jeep vehicles through 1963 although these were still commonly known as NEKAFs.

The NEKAF jeeps differed from the US version by adding side reflectors (white in front and red at the rear), low intensity "city lights" on the front fenders and front and rear mounted directional signals. In a bid to reduce the costs, the Ministry of War, having invested already in clothing for the crews, ordered the cabin heaters to be deleted. This modification entailed considerable redesign of the engine cooling unit which eventually led to increased cost of the vehicles (some 12,000 Dutch guilders each). The jeeps, dubbed NEKAF by the military, started to enter service in 1956 and remained so well into the 1990s albeit on reservist duties. The NEKAF jeep saw action in the brief Dutch Indonesian war in 1962, but particularly during the UNIFIL operation in which an armoured infantry battalion participated from 1979 till 1983, the NEKAF turned out to be a robust and reliable vehicle in South Lebanon. Upon withdrawal of the Dutch battalion all UNIFIL NEKAFs were dismantled and sold locally as scrap, save three NEKAFs that were secretly withheld and privately driven back to the Netherlands. One of these sole surviving UNIFIL NEKAFs is now in the collection of the Legermuseum Delft (the Dutch Army Museum).
