= Jeep Willys2 =

Concept car

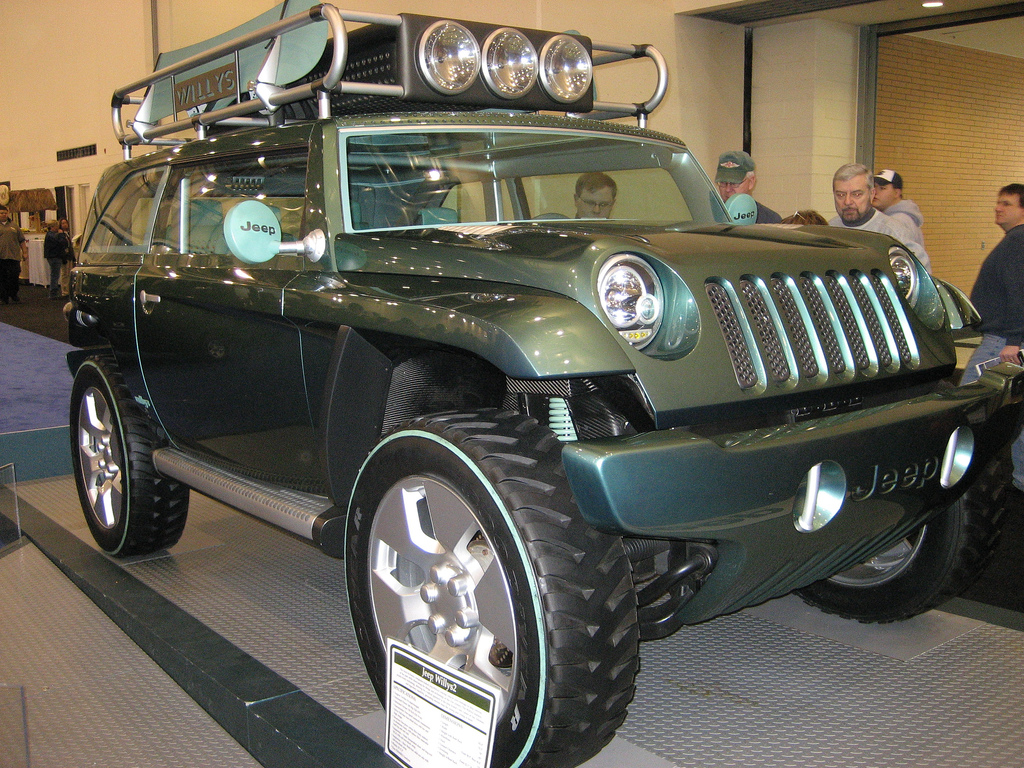

Overview
- Manufacturer: Chrysler Group
- Also called: Jeep Willys 2
- Production: 2001

Body and chassis
- Class: Concept car
- Body style: 2-door crossover
- Layout: 4WD
- Related: Jeep Liberty

Powertrain
- Engine: 1.6 L supercharged I4
- Transmission: 4-speed automatic

Dimensions
- Wheelbase: 2,438.4 mm (96 in)
- Curb weight: 1,361 kg (3,000 lb)

The Jeep Willys2 is a concept car made by the Chrysler Group and presented at the 2001 Tokyo Auto Show.

== Design and features ==
The Willys2 is based on the Willys MB and uses frame web technology and a one-piece carbon-fiber body. The design takes many design cues from other Jeep models, such as the seven-slot grille and trapezoidal wheel arches. Some elements of the design were later incorporated into the Jeep Liberty. The Willys2 weighs around 1,361 kg (3,000 lb) with its removable carbon-fiber top. The interior is all plastic, and it is possible to clean the interior by spraying it with water.

== Specifications and performance ==
The Willys2 was powered by a 1.6 L supercharged I4 engine paired with a 4-speed automatic transmission, this combination allows it to produce about 160 hp (120 kW) and 155 lb⋅ft (210 N⋅m) of torque. It accelerates 0–100 km/h (0–62 mph) in approximately 10 seconds and reaching a top speed at around 145 km/h (90 mph).
