= Ford Explorer =

Range of SUVs manufactured by the Ford Motor Company

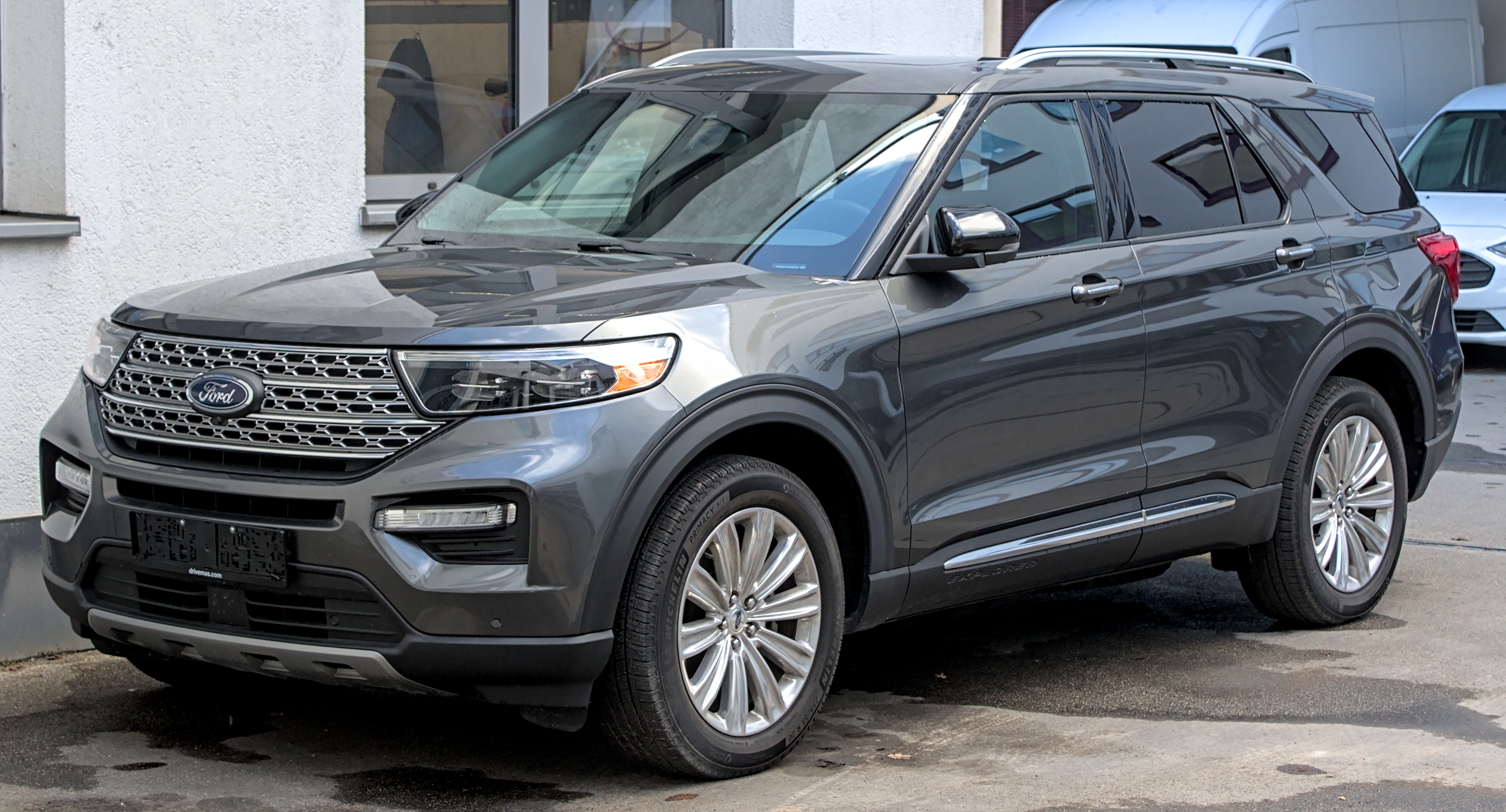
- Sixth-generation Ford Explorer

Overview
- Manufacturer: Ford
- Production: 1990–present
- Model years: 1991–present

Body and chassis
- Class: Compact SUV (3-door/Sport) (1991–2003); Mid-size SUV (1991–2010); Mid-size crossover SUV (2011–present)
- Chassis: Body-on-frame (1991–2010); Unibody (2011–present)

Chronology
- Predecessor: Ford Bronco II
- Successor: Ford Territory (Oceania)

The Ford Explorer is a range of SUVs manufactured by the Ford Motor Company since the 1991 model year. The first five-door SUV produced by Ford, the Explorer was introduced as a replacement for the three-door Bronco II. As with the Ford Ranger, the model line derives its name from a trim package previously offered on Ford F-Series pickup trucks. In 2020, the Explorer became the best-selling SUV in the American market.

Currently in its sixth generation, the Explorer has featured a five-door wagon body style since its 1991 introduction. During the first two generations, the model line included a three-door wagon (directly replacing the Bronco II). The Ford Explorer Sport Trac is a crew-cab mid-size pickup truck derived from the second-generation Explorer. The fifth and sixth generations of the Explorer have been produced as the Ford Police Interceptor Utility (replacing both the Ford Crown Victoria Police Interceptor and the Ford Police Interceptor Sedan).

The Explorer is slotted between the Ford Edge and Ford Expedition within North America's current Ford SUV range. The model line has undergone rebadging several times, with Mazda, Mercury, and Lincoln each selling derivative variants. Currently, Lincoln markets a luxury version of the Explorer as the Lincoln Aviator.

For the North American market, the first four generations of the Explorer were produced by Ford at its Louisville Assembly Plant (Louisville, Kentucky) and its now-closed St. Louis Assembly Plant (Hazelwood, Missouri). Ford currently assembles the Explorer alongside the Lincoln Aviator and the Police Interceptor Utility at its Chicago Assembly Plant (Chicago, Illinois).

== First generation (UN46; 1991) ==
First generation
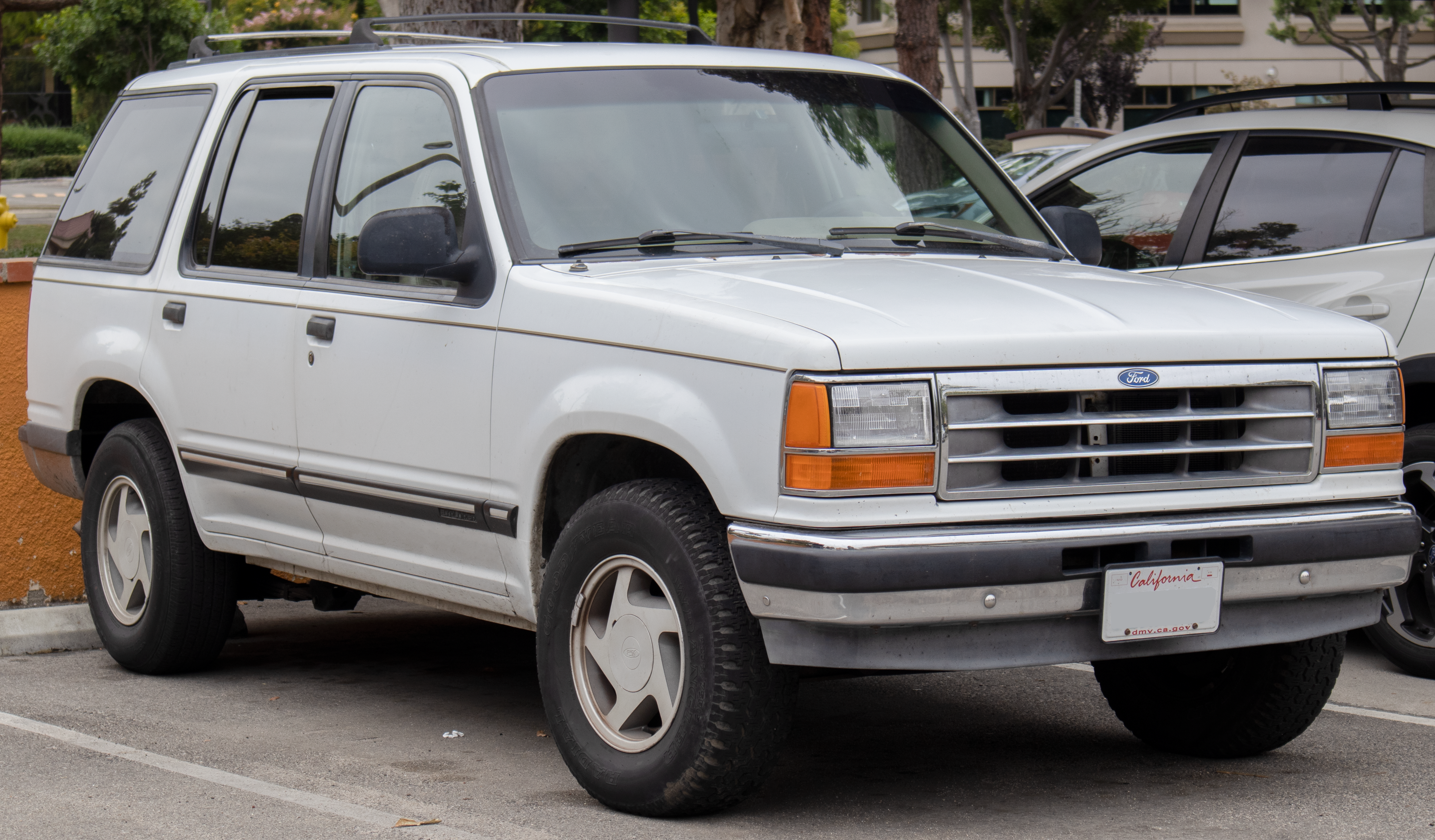
- First-generation Ford Explorer XLT

Overview
- Model code: UN46
- Production: February 15, 1990 – November 1994
- Model years: 1991–1994
- Assembly: United States: Louisville, Kentucky (Louisville Assembly Plant); St. Louis, Missouri (St. Louis Assembly); Venezuela: Valencia, Carabobo (Valencia Assembly)

Body and chassis
- Body style: 3-door SUV; 5-door SUV
- Layout: Front engine, rear-wheel drive / four-wheel drive
- Related: Ford Ranger; Mazda Navajo

Powertrain
- Engine: Gasoline: 4.0 L OHV Cologne V6
- Transmission: 5-speed M5OD-R1 manual 4-speed A4LD automatic

Dimensions
- Wheelbase: 3-door: 102.1 in (2,593 mm); 5-door: 111.9 in (2,842 mm)
- Length: 3-door: 174.5 in (4,432 mm); 5-door: 184.3 in (4,681 mm)
- Width: 70.2 in (1,783 mm)
- Height: 3-door: 67.5 in (1,714 mm); 5-door: 67.3 in (1,709 mm); Eddie Bauer: 68.3 in (1,735 mm)

The Ford Explorer was introduced in March 1990 as an early 1991 model to replace the Bronco II. As Ford sought to balance off-road capability with family use of the vehicle, the Explorer underwent design changes from its predecessor while still retaining mechanical commonality with the Ranger pickup truck.

Growing in size from the compact Bronco II (similar to its 1960s namesake), the Explorer was a mid-size SUV, competing directly against the Jeep Cherokee (XJ) and Chevrolet S-10 Blazer. To compete against both model lines, three-door and five-door body styles were launched (introduced in the same month as the five-door S-10 Blazer and seven years after the Jeep Cherokee XJ started the five-door SUV trend). The Explorer's wider body allowed for three-across rear passenger seating in the five-door version built on an extended wheelbase. The traditional exterior-mounted swing-away spare tire carrier was deleted in favor of an underfloor location. Like the Ford Taurus station wagon, the rear liftgate had a flip-up rear window.

=== Chassis ===
As with the Bronco II, the first-generation Explorer (design code UN46) shares its chassis underpinnings with the 1983–1992 Ford Ranger. The three-door version uses a 102.1 in (2,593 mm) wheelbase (8.1 in (206 mm) longer than the Bronco II) while the new five-door features a 111.9 in (2,842 mm) wheelbase.

As with the Ranger, the UN46 Explorer has a Twin I-Beam (4×2) or Twin-Traction Beam (4×4) coil-sprung front independent suspension and a leaf-sprung solid rear axle. Brakes are discs in the front with drums in the rear. Anti-lock (ABS) was only on the rear axle during early years, with four-wheel ABS available by 1994.

==== Powertrain ====
The first-generation Explorer was equipped with a 4.0 L Cologne V6, an optional engine for the Ranger and the Ford Aerostar. Initially producing 155 hp (116 kW), the engine output was raised to 160 hp (119 kW) for 1993. A Mazda M5OD 5-speed manual was the standard transmission offering, with the option of the Ford 4-speed A4LD overdrive automatic transmission.

Along with the standard rear-wheel drive, the Explorer was offered two configurations of part-time four-wheel drive at its launch using a Borg Warner 13–54 transfer case. The "Touch Drive" electric-shift transfer case was standard (shared with the Ranger and the previous Bronco II); it allowed the vehicle to be shifted from two-wheel drive into high-range 4x4 drive (at any speed) and into low-range 4×4 (when stopped). As an option, the Explorer was also offered with a manual-shift transfer case (the option was paired with manual-locking hubs).

All Explorers were equipped with the Ford 8.8 axle in either a limited-slip differential or an open version; multiple rear-axle ratios could be specified. Four-wheel-drive front axles were the TTB ("Twin Traction Beam") Dana 35 with some Dana 44-spec components; 4×2 models shared Twin I-Beam components with the Ranger.

Engine	Production	Configuration	Power	Torque	Transmission	Transfer Case
Ford Cologne V6	1991–1994	245 cubic inches (4.0 L) OHV 12-valve V6	155 hp (116 kW) (1991–1992) 160 hp (120 kW) (1993–1994)	220 lb⋅ft (298 N⋅m)	5-speed manual (Mazda M5OD-R1) 4-speed automatic (Ford A4LD)	Borg Warner 13-54 Electric Shift Touch Drive Optional: 2-speed manual transfer case

=== Body ===
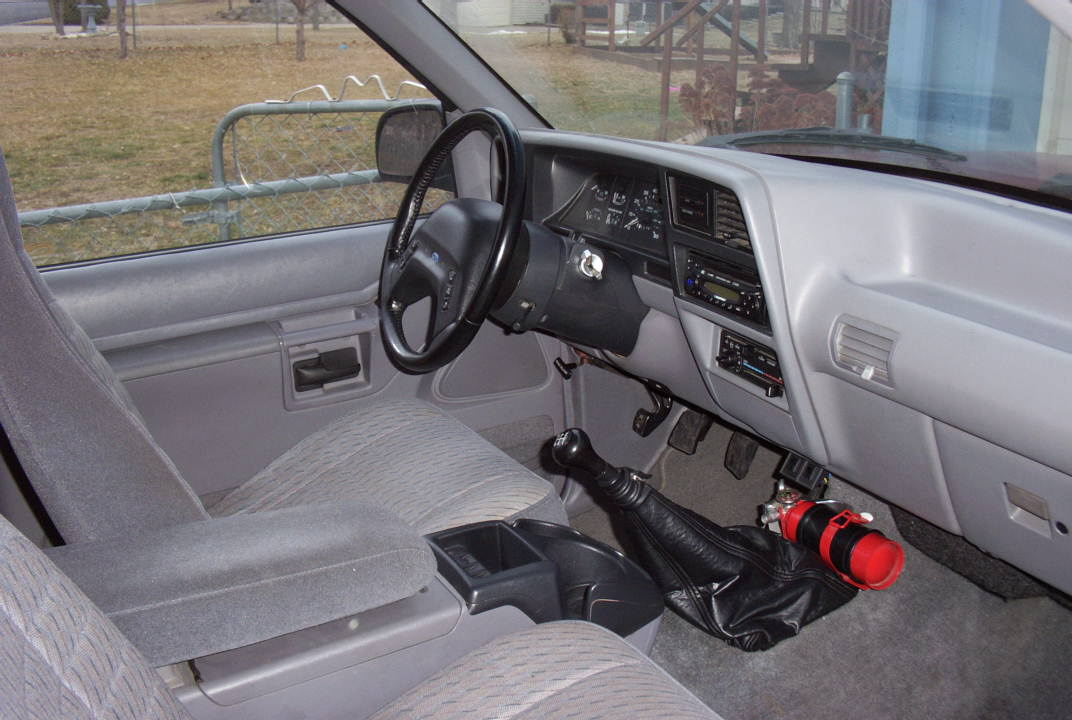
Interior

Shifting into the midsize SUV size class, the first-generation Explorer is far larger than the Bronco II. The three-door Explorer grew 12.6 inches in length, with the five-door Explorer 22.4 inches longer and 730 pounds heavier than the 1990 Bronco II.

As with the outgoing Bronco II, the Explorer shared many design elements with the 1989-1992 Ranger, adopting its front bumper, headlamps, and wheels; the grille was sourced from the off-road oriented Ranger STX (moving the Blue Oval to the top of the grille). Alongside the introduction of the five-door body style, the body was styled with multiple aerodynamic upgrades over its predecessor, including its own door stampings to eliminate exterior drip rails and bracket-mount sideview mirrors (replaced by ones integrated into the doors). In what would become a design feature of the model line, the B-pillar and D-pillars were blacked out. The three-door body shared a similar roofline as its five-door counterpart, fitted with pop-out rear quarter windows (instead of roll-down windows) and a forward-sloping C-pillar.

The interior of the Explorer was fitted largely with all-new trim (though carrying over the dashboard in its entirety from the Ranger/Bronco II), with model-specific door panels and seats. On three-door Explorers, four-passenger seating was carried over (though with a body increased over two inches in width), with front bucket seats and a split-folding rear bench. Five-door Explorers were fitted with standard front bucket seats and a three-passenger split-folding rear bench seat. A front split-bench seat was offered as an option (dependent on trim), expanding seating to six passengers.

=== Trim ===
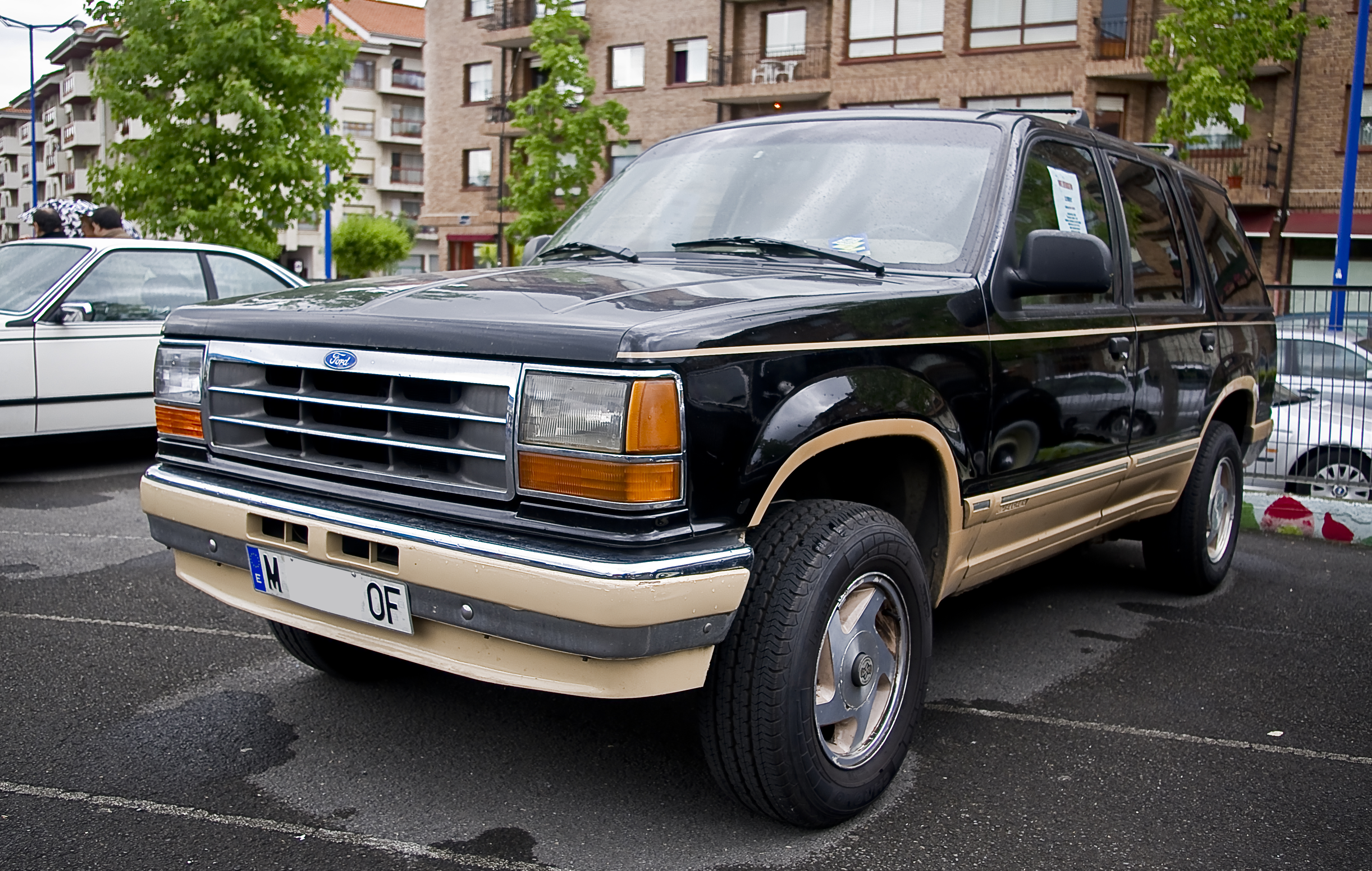
1992 Ford Explorer Eddie Bauer

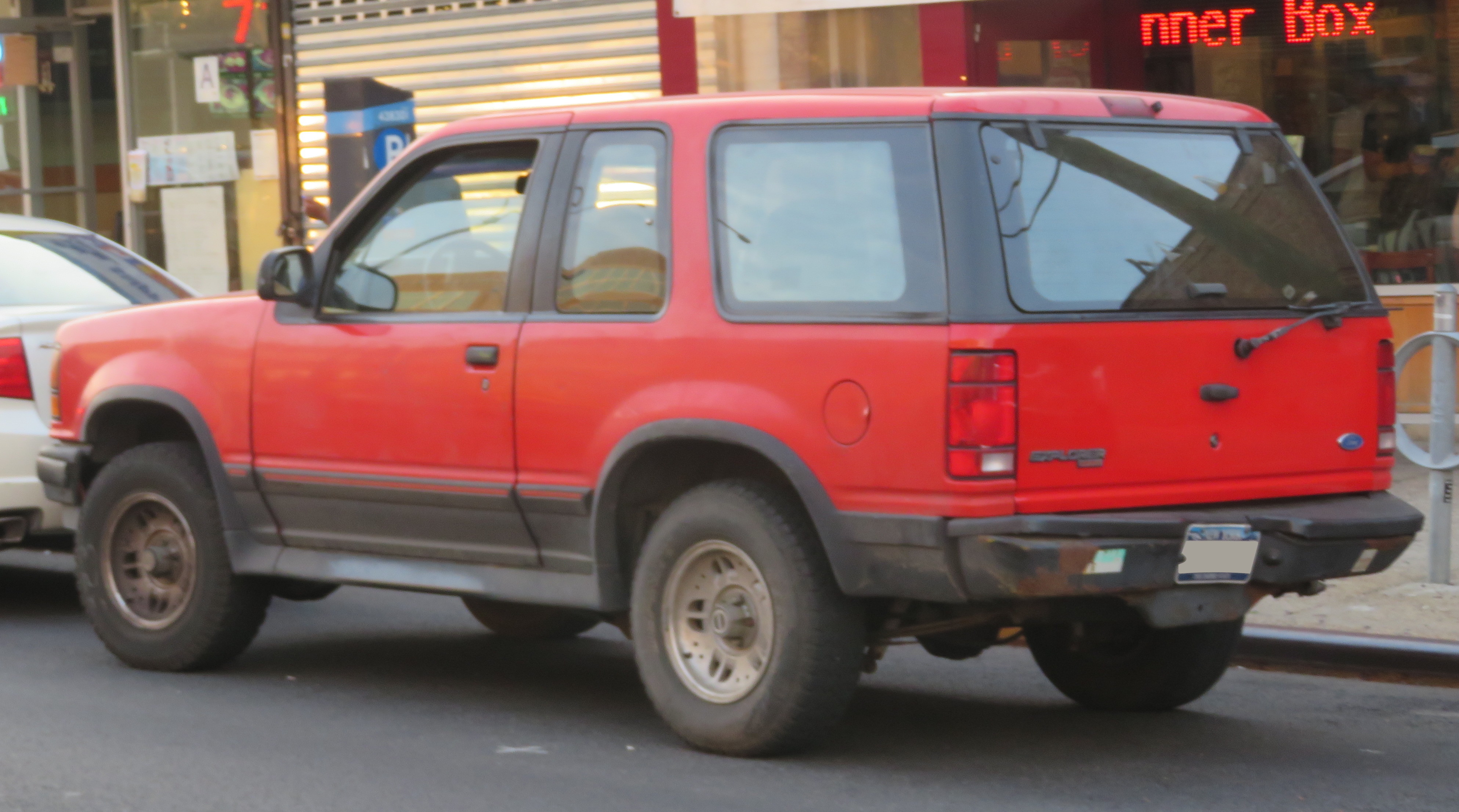
1994 Ford Explorer Sport rear

The first-generation Explorer followed the rest of the Ford light truck line in trim nomenclature, marketing a base-level XL trim and higher-range XLT trim. Sharing the features of the XLT, the outdoors-themed Eddie Bauer was the highest-range trim. The XL was distinguished by a black grille (chrome optional) with steel wheels, while the XLT offered a chrome grille and alloy wheels; the Eddie Bauer offered alloy wheels and two-tone paintwork.

The three-door Explorer differed slightly, sharing the XL and Eddie Bauer trims with the five-door. In place of the XLT trim, the Explorer Sport was offered, distinguished by its black lower bodywork, grille, and standard alloy wheels. From 1991 through 1994, the Explorer Sport was marketed by Mazda as the Mazda Navajo (see below); the 1991 Mazda Navajo became the first SUV to win the Motor Trend Truck of the Year award.

For 1993, Ford introduced the Explorer Limited as a luxury-trim version of the model line, offered only as a five-door. Slotted above the Eddie Bauer, the Limited was largely introduced as a direct competitor for the Oldsmobile Bravada and Jeep Grand Wagoneer. Distinguished by its monochromatic exterior (including a color-matched grille, headlamp trim, and bumpers), the Limited was also fitted with model-specific alloy wheels and lower bodywork. The trim was fitted with nearly every feature available to the model line (the only options offered for the Explorer Limited were a sunroof, compact disc player, and the towing package), also serving as the introduction of several features offered as options on other trims for 1994, including an anti-theft system, keyless entry, and automatic headlights.

=== Mazda Navajo ===
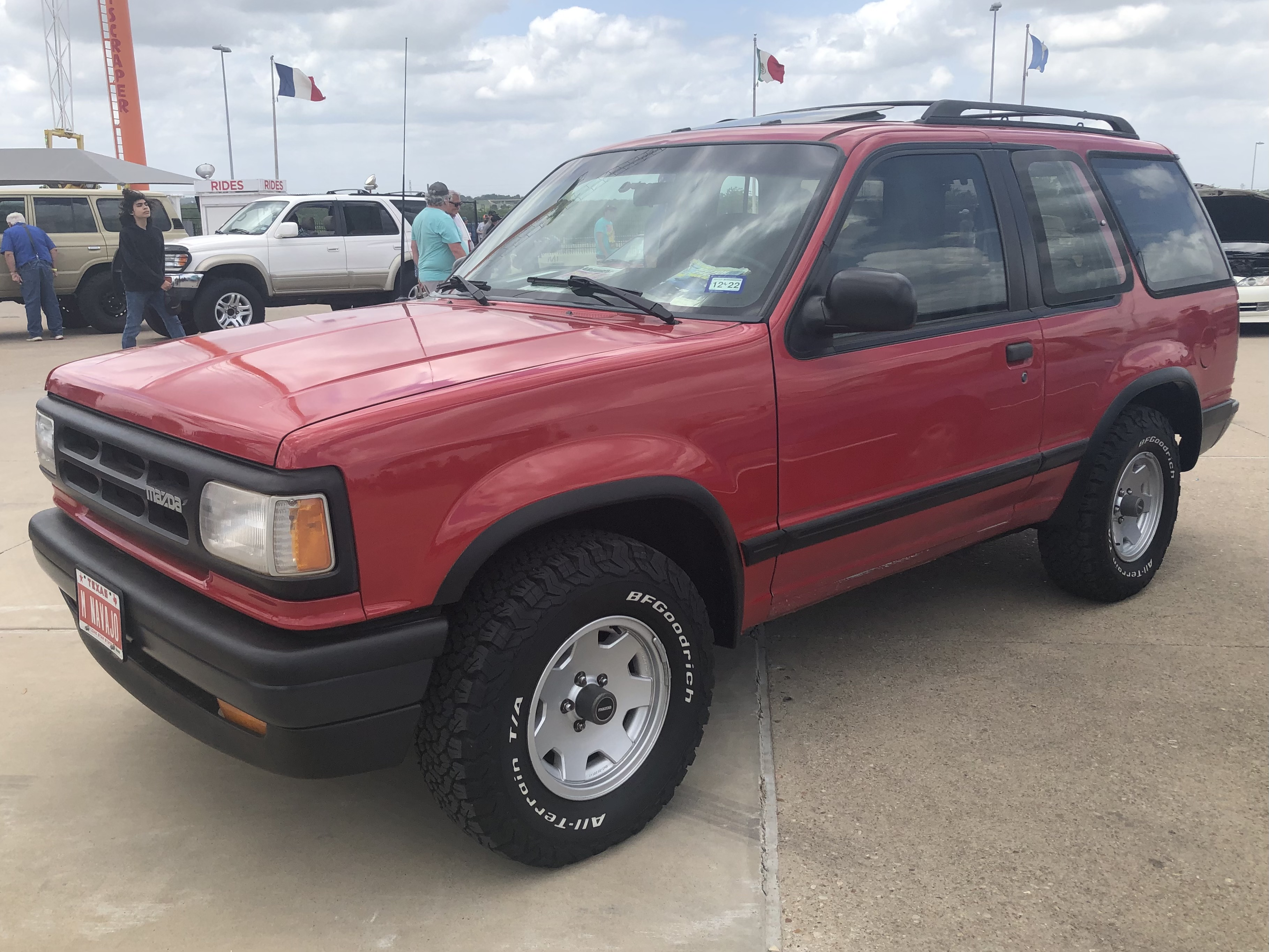
Mazda Navajo

The Mazda Navajo is a rebadged version of the first generation Ford Explorer. It was Mazda's first SUV, and was offered with a choice of rear-wheel drive or four-wheel drive. The Navajo won the 1991 Motor Trend Truck of the Year award, but because of its Explorer origins, its reputation deteriorated amid the Firestone and Ford tire controversy.

The Navajo featured a few minor changes from the Explorer it was based on. It was given a revised front fascia, new taillamps and wheels, and the bumpers were painted dark gray (resulting in the deletion of all chrome trim). The interior was largely shared between the two model lines, with the Navajo receiving its own lettering for the instrument panel (in line with other Mazda vehicles), and Mazda lettering was added to the Ford steering wheel hub. In place of the three trims offered on the three-door Ford Explorer, Mazda offered the Navajo in base DX and top-tier LX trim (roughly the equivalent of the Explorer Sport and three-door Explorer XLT). Offered only with four-wheel drive at its launch, a rear-wheel drive version of the Navajo was introduced for 1992. As with the first-generation Explorer, all Navajos were fitted with a 4.0 L V6 producing 160 hp (119 kW); a five-speed manual was standard, with a four-speed automatic offered as an option (on both the DX and LX).

Some criticized Mazda's use of the Navajo name without compensating the Navajo people, considering it exploitative. During a 1990 unveiling ceremony, Mazda spokesperson Duane Bowen responded to the criticism by saying that the name was chosen as "uniquely American," and a symbol of strength and integrity. To address the criticism, Mazda donated a 1991 model Navajo to the tribe, which was officially accepted by the Government Services Committee of Torreon, New Mexico.

Production of the Mazda Navajo came to an end after three years. The Navajo was replaced by the Ford Escape-based Mazda Tribute.

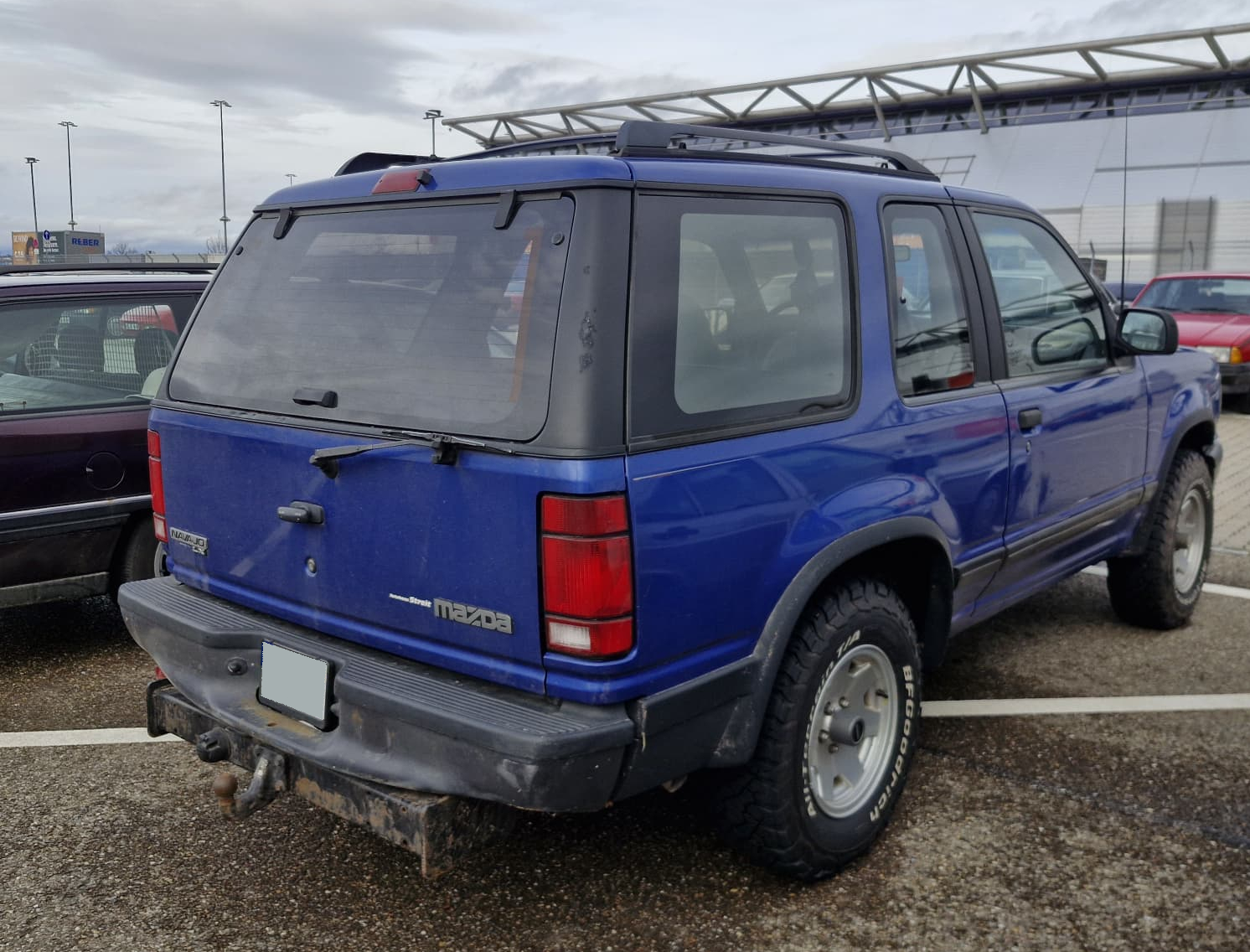
Mazda Navajo (Rear)

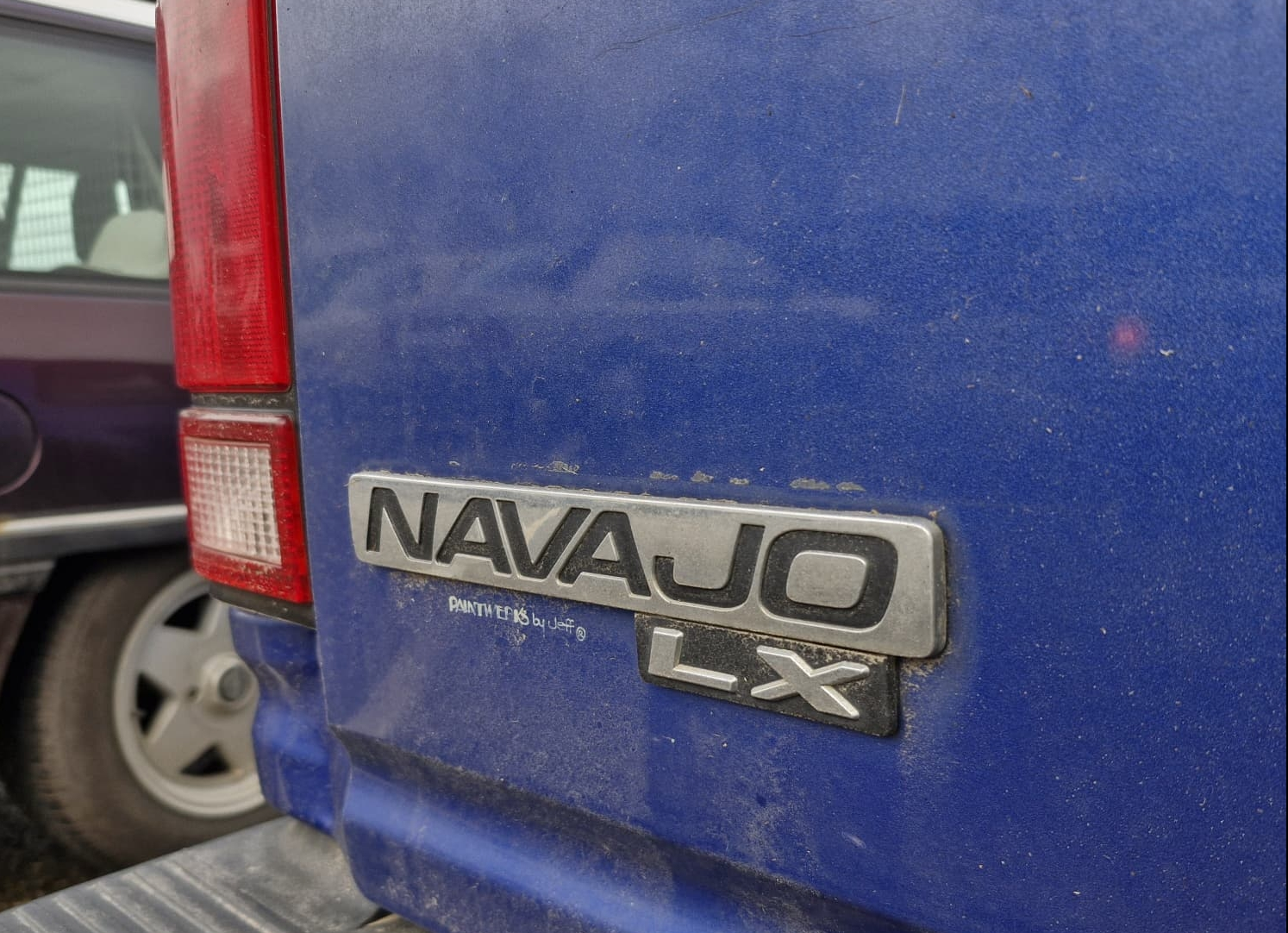
Logo (LX trim)

== Second generation (UN105/150; 1995) ==
Second generation
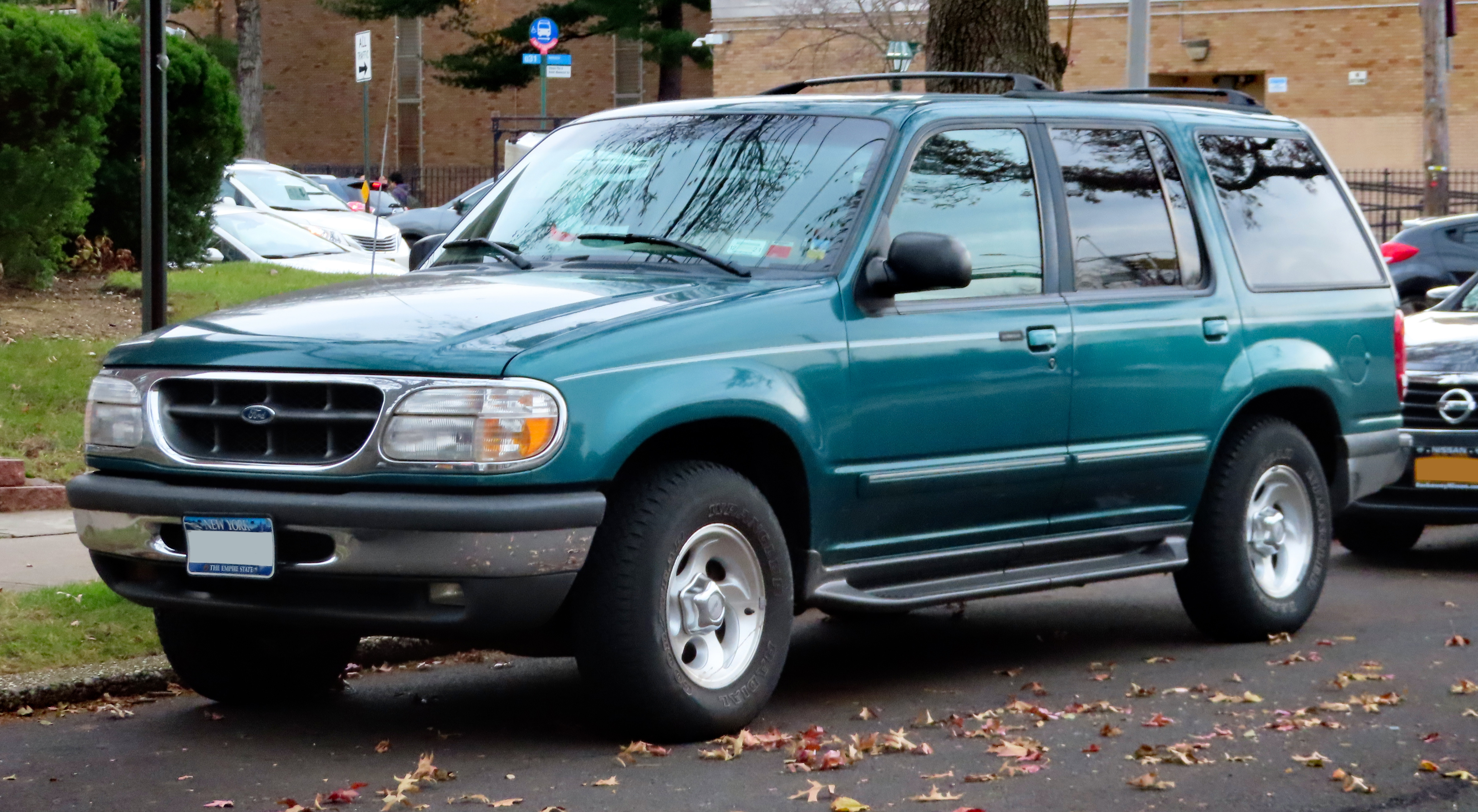

Overview
- Model code: UN105; UN150
- Also called: Ford Explorer Sport (3-door) (1999–2003)
- Production: November 1994 – December 2000 (4-door); November 1994 – July 2003 (3-door/Explorer Sport)
- Model years: 1995–2001 (5-door); 1995–2003 (3-door)
- Assembly: United States: Louisville, Kentucky (Louisville Assembly Plant); St. Louis, Missouri (St. Louis Assembly Plant); Venezuela: Valencia, Carabobo (Valencia Assembly)
- Designer: Bob Aikins (1992)

Body and chassis
- Body style: 3-door SUV (1995–2003); 5-door SUV (1995–2001)
- Layout: Front engine, rear-wheel drive / four-wheel drive
- Related: Ford Explorer Sport Trac; Mercury Mountaineer

Powertrain
- Engine: Gasoline: 4.0 L Cologne OHV V6 (1995–2000); 4.0 L Cologne SOHC V6 (1997–2003); 5.0 L small block OHV V8 (1996–2001)
- Transmission: 5-speed M5OD-R1 manual (4.0 L OHV); 5-speed M5OD-R1HD manual (2001–2003 Explorer Sport); 4-speed 4R55E automatic (4.0 L 1995–1996); 4-speed 4R70W automatic (V8 models); 5-speed 5R55E automatic (4.0 L 1997–2003)

Dimensions
- Wheelbase: 1995–97 5-door: 111.5 in (2,832 mm); 1998–2001 5-door: 111.6 in (2,835 mm); 1995–99 3-door: 101.7 in (2,583 mm); 2000–03 3-door: 101.8 in (2,586 mm)
- Length: 1995–2001 5-door: 190.7 in (4,844 mm); 1995–97 3-door: 178.6 in (4,536 mm); 1998–99 3-door: 180.8 in (4,592 mm); 2000–03 3-door: 180.4 in (4,582 mm)
- Width: 70.2 in (1,783 mm)
- Height: 67.0–68.3 in (1,702–1,735 mm)

For the 1995 model year, Ford released a second generation of the Explorer. Following the success of the first generation, the redesign of the exterior was largely evolutionary, with the model line receiving front bodywork distinct from the Ranger. Rear-wheel drive remained standard, with part-time four-wheel drive offered as an option, and all-wheel drive was introduced as an option.

To better compete against the Jeep Grand Cherokee, a 4.9 liters (302 cu in) V8 was introduced as an optional engine. The Explorer went from lacking airbags to having dual airbags (a first for an American-brand SUV).

The Lincoln-Mercury division introduced its first SUV for the 1997 model year, the Mercury Mountaineer. In contrast to the Mazda Navajo, the Mountaineer was sold only as a five-door. For 2001, Ford introduced the Ford Explorer Sport Trac mid-size crew-cab pickup truck based on the five-door Explorer. Following the introduction of the third-generation Explorer for 2002, the three-door used the second-generation body style through the 2003 model year.

=== Chassis ===
The second-generation Ford Explorer is based upon the Ford U1 platform shared with its predecessor, adopting the UN105/UN150 model codes. Introducing key chassis upgrades that were also shared with the 1998 Ford Ranger, the long-running Twin I-Beam/Twin Traction Beam front suspension was retired in favor of a short/long-arm (SLA) wishbone front suspension configuration in order to accommodate larger engines. Along with more compact packaging of front suspension components (allowing for a lower hoodline), the design allowed for improved on-road handling/feel. In line with the Ranger and F-Series trucks, the rear suspension remained a leaf-sprung live rear axle.

The standard four-wheel ABS of the previous generation returned; the rear drum brakes were replaced by disc brakes. As with the first generation, rear-wheel drive remained standard with part-time four-wheel drive as an option; all-wheel drive became an option for the first time.

==== Powertrain ====
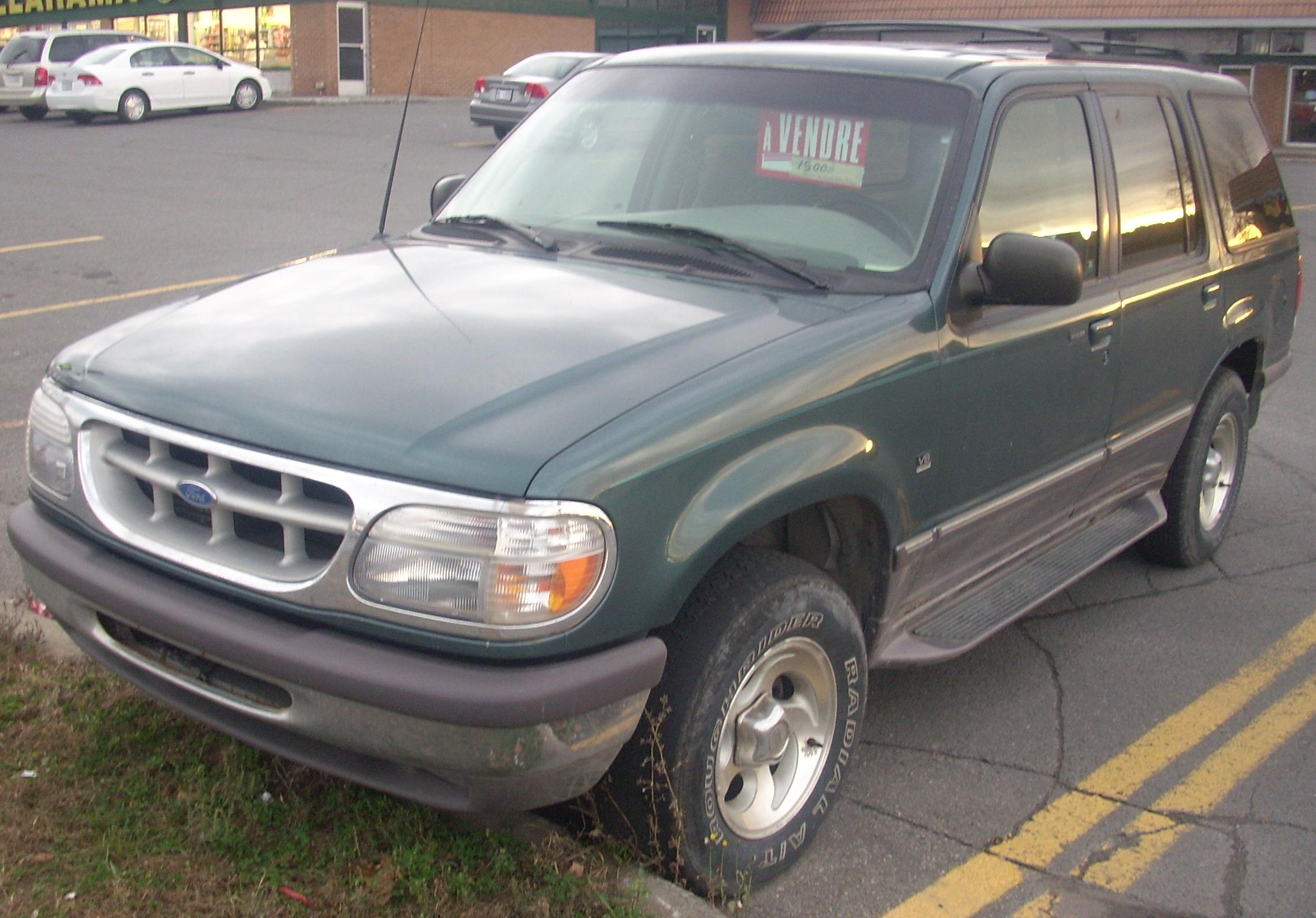
1995–1997 Ford Explorer XLT V8

The second generation Explorer carried over its 160 hp 4.0 L V6 from the previous generation (shared with the Ranger and Aerostar). For 1996, largely to match the V8 engine offerings of the Jeep Grand Cherokee and Land Rover Discovery, a 210 hp (157 kW) 4.9 L (302 cu in) V8 (marketed as 5.0 L) was introduced as an option for rear-wheel drive XLT five-doors. By 1997, the V8 was offered with nearly all trims (except XL) and was paired with all-wheel drive; output was increased to 215 hp (160 kW) (from revised cylinder heads).

For 1997, a third engine was added to the model line, as Ford introduced an overhead-cam version of the 4.0 L Cologne V6. Differing from its predecessor primarily by its single-overhead-cam drivetrain, the 210 hp engine rivaled the V8 in output. Introduced as standard equipment for Eddie Bauer and Limited trims, by 1998, the engine became offered on all non-XL trims. For 2001, the overhead-valve version of the 4.0 L V6 was discontinued, with the SOHC engine becoming standard (and the only engine of the Explorer Sport).

Following the introduction of the overhead-cam Triton-series V8s for the 1997 Ford F-Series and E-Series, the 2001 Explorer would be the final Ford Motor Company vehicle in North America sold with an overhead-valve gasoline-powered V8 engine for nearly two decades (until the 2020 introduction of the 7.3 L Godzilla V8 for Super Duty trucks).

For 2000, Ford added flex-fuel capability to the Explorer for the first time. The flex-fuel SOHC V6 and chassis were mated to an aluminum body built by Utilimaster in the Ford-Utilimaster FFV, a delivery vehicle built for the United States Postal Service in 2000 and 2001.

A Mazda-produced 5-speed manual was standard with the 4.0 L OHV V6 engine; the SOHC V6 was not offered with a manual transmission until 2000, receiving a heavier-duty version of the Mazda-sourced 5-speed. The V6 Explorers initially received a 4-speed automatic, shared with the Ranger and Aerostar, adopting a 5-speed automatic for 1997. The 4.9 litres (302 cu in) V8 was paired only with a 4-speed heavy-duty automatic (shared with the F-150, Crown Victoria/Grand Marquis, and Lincoln Mark VIII).

For the second-generation Explorer, the four-wheel drive system underwent a redesign. The previous Touch-Drive system (electrically operated) was retired and replaced by ControlTrac, an electronically controlled full-time four-wheel drive system with a two-speed transfer case; in place of a center differential, software-controlled multi-disc clutch. Similar to the previous push-button Touch-Drive system, a rotary dash selector was used for driver input, selecting two-wheel drive (rear wheels), and four-wheel drive (high and low range). As an intermediate mode, "Auto" mode allowed software to control the torque sent to the front wheels; if the rear axle began to spin, torque was shifted from the rear wheels to the front wheels until traction is achieved. The manually operated hubs and manual transfer cases were discontinued.

Similar to the system used on the Aerostar van, the V8 Explorer used a full-time all-wheel drive system without separate high or low ranges. The all-wheel drive's torque distribution was via a viscous clutch with a 40/60 split.

Engine	Production	Configuration	Power	Torque	Transmission	Transfer Case
Ford Cologne V6	1995–2000	245 cu in (4.0 L) OHV 12V V6	160 hp (119 kW)	220 lb⋅ft (298 N⋅m)	5-speed manual (Mazda M5OD-R1) 4-speed automatic (Ford 4R55E); 1995–1996 5-speed automatic (Ford 5R55E); 1997–2000	Borg Warner 44-05 Electric Shift Control Trac
Ford Cologne V6	1997–2003	245 cu in (4.0 L) SOHC 12V V6	210 hp (157 kW)	254 lb⋅ft (344 N⋅m)	5-speed manual (Mazda M5OD-R1HD); 2001–2003 Explorer Sport 5-speed automatic (Ford 5R55E)	Borg Warner 44-05 Electric Shift Control Trac; 1997–2001 Borg Warner 13-54 Electric Shift; 2001–2003 Explorer Sport
Ford small block 5.0 L V8	1996–2001	302 cu in (4.9 L) OHV 16V V8	210 hp (157 kW)	280 lb⋅ft (380 N⋅m)	4-speed automatic (Ford 4R70W)	Borg Warner 44-04 Full-Time AWD

=== Body ===
While bearing an evolutionary resemblance to the previous generation, nearly the entire body underwent a change, with only the roof and the side door stampings carried over. Coinciding with the lower hoodline allowed by the redesigned front suspension, much of the body was distinguished by a restyled front fascia, introducing a styling theme used by several other Ford light trucks during the late 1990s. The Ford Blue Oval was centered in a now-oval grille, joined by oval headlamp clusters wrapping into the fenders. In contrast to the front fascia, the rear body saw relatively few changes, receiving mildly restyled taillamps (with amber turn signals). In a functional change, the Explorer received a neon CHMSL (center brake light), adopted from the Lincoln Mark VIII.

While again directly sharing its dashboard with the Ranger, the interior of the Explorer underwent a complete redesign (allowing for the fitment of dual airbags). To improve driver ergonomics, the instrument panel received larger gauges, rotary-style climate controls, and a double-DIN radio panel.

For 1997, export-market Explorers received a third-row seat as an option (expanding seating to seven passengers).

For 1998, Ford gave the exterior of the model line a mid-cycle revision. Distinguished by body-color rear D-pillars and larger taillamps, the rear license plate was relocated from the rear bumper to the liftgate (to better accommodate export); the neon CHMSL was replaced by an LED version. In another change, 16-inch wheels were introduced. The interior received redesigned front and rear seats; alongside second-generation dual airbags, side airbags were introduced (as an option). Other options included load-leveling air suspension (on Eddie Bauer and Limited) and a reverse-sensing warning system. The rarely-specified 60/40 front bench seat was restricted to fleet vehicles after 1998 and was discontinued for 2000.

For 1999, the front bumper underwent a second revision, adding a larger cooling inlet and standard fog lights. All three-door Explorers were now renamed Explorer Sport.

For 2001, the three-door Explorer Sport underwent an additional revision, now sharing the front fascia and interior with the newly introduced Explorer Sport Trac pickup truck.

For 2002, the five-door body style would be replaced by an all new Explorer, with only the three-door Explorer Sport and Sport Trac maintaining the second-generation architecture. Styling changes for the Sport are minimal, with the rear wiper moving from the tailgate assembly to being built into the rear window.

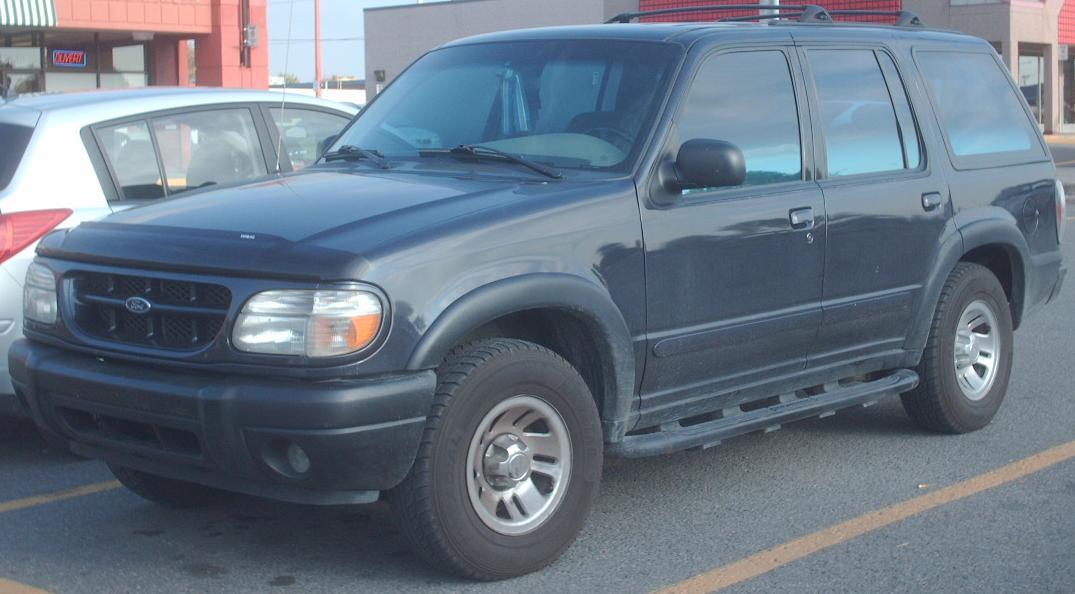
1999–2001 Ford Explorer XLS

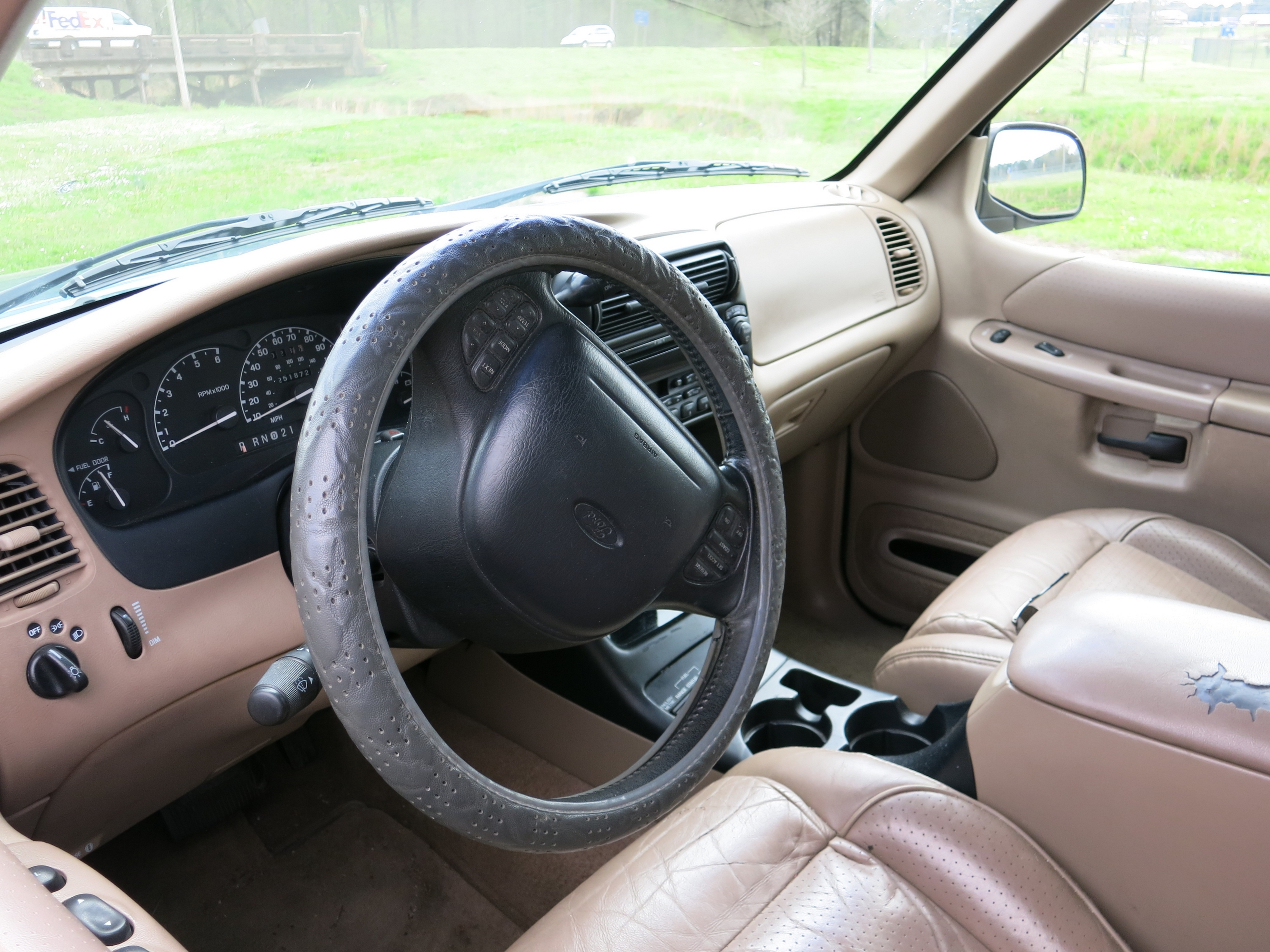
Interior, 1998 Ford Explorer Eddie Bauer

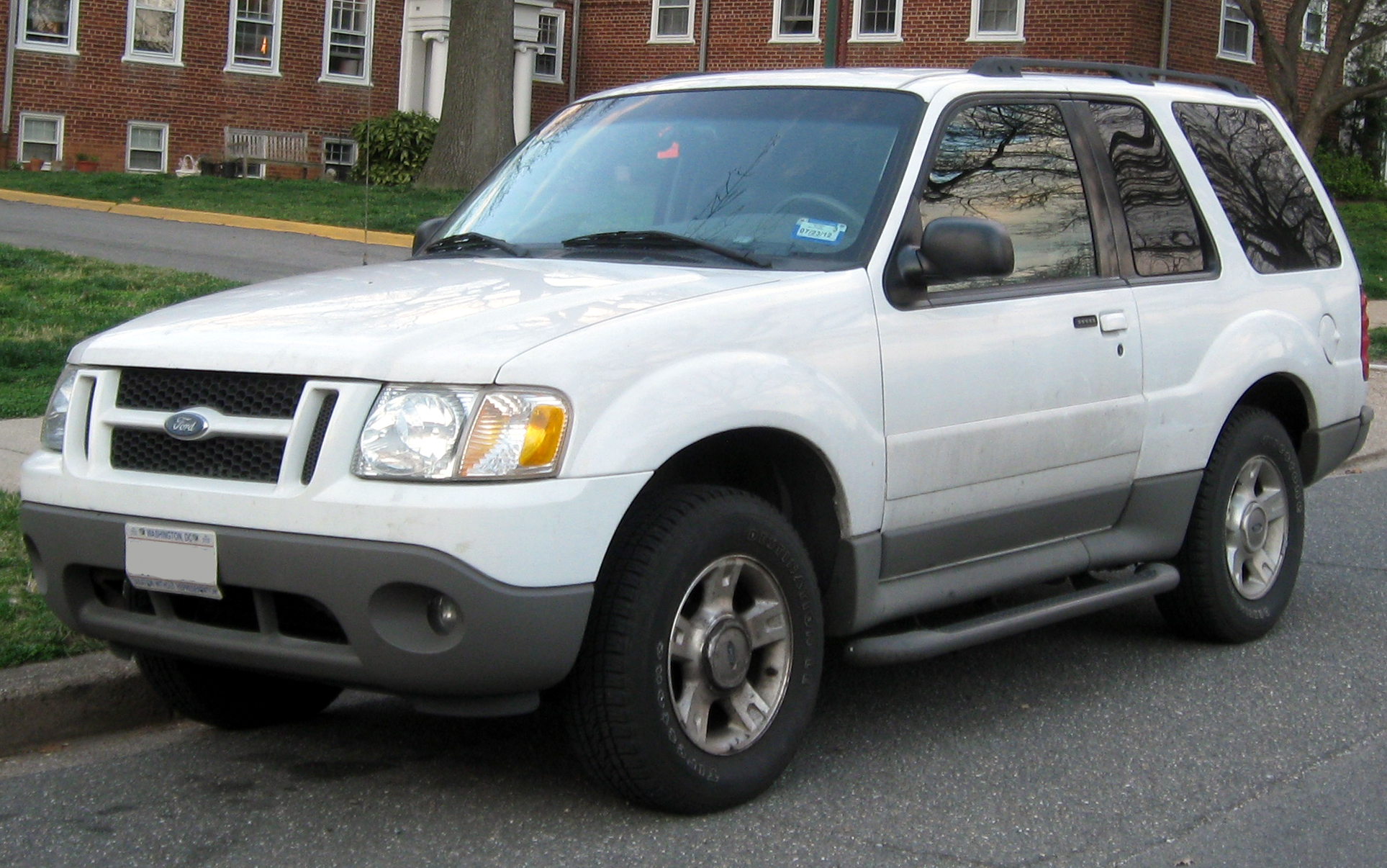
2001–2003 Ford Explorer Sport with updated front fascia

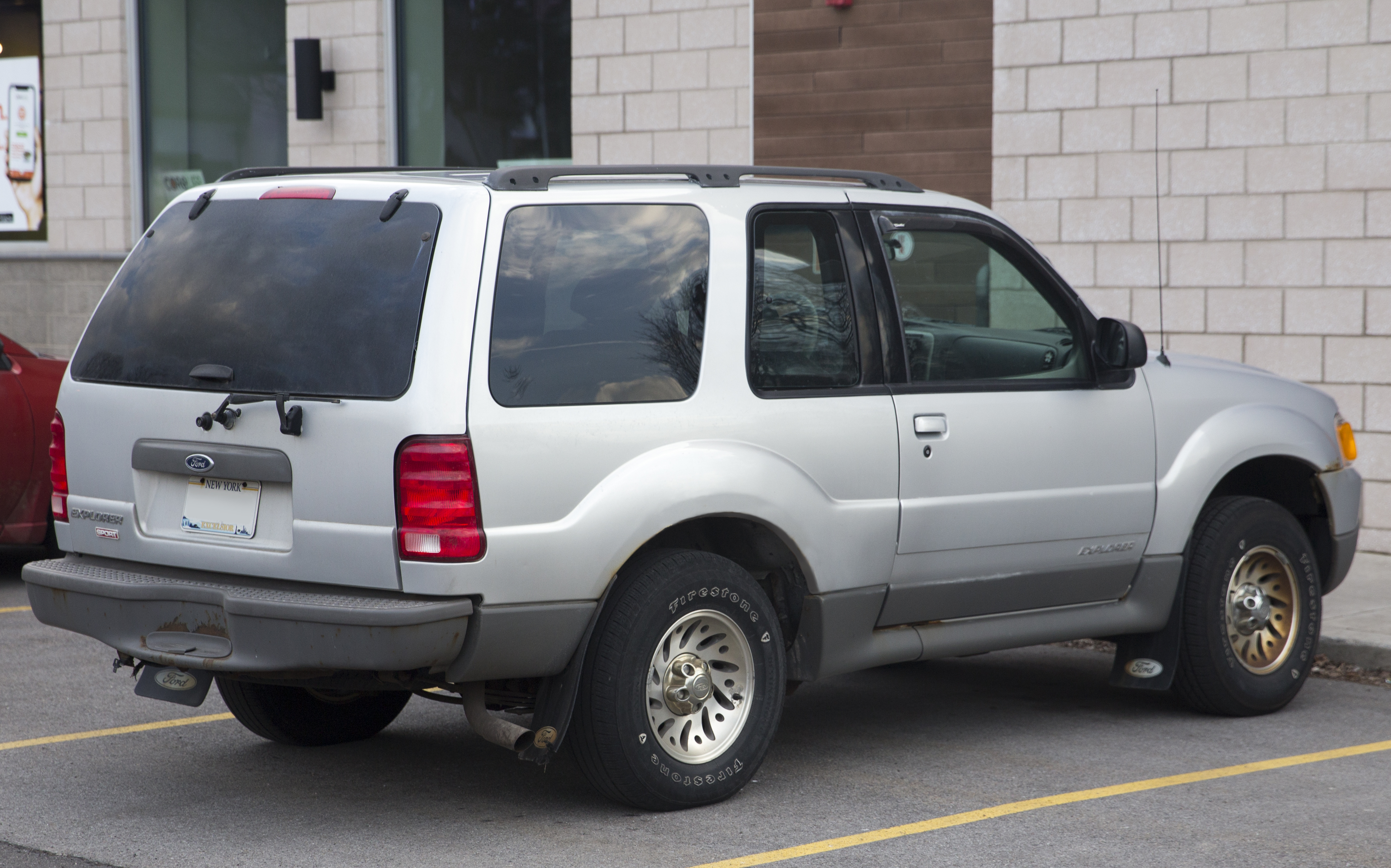
Rear view of Explorer Sport

=== Trim ===
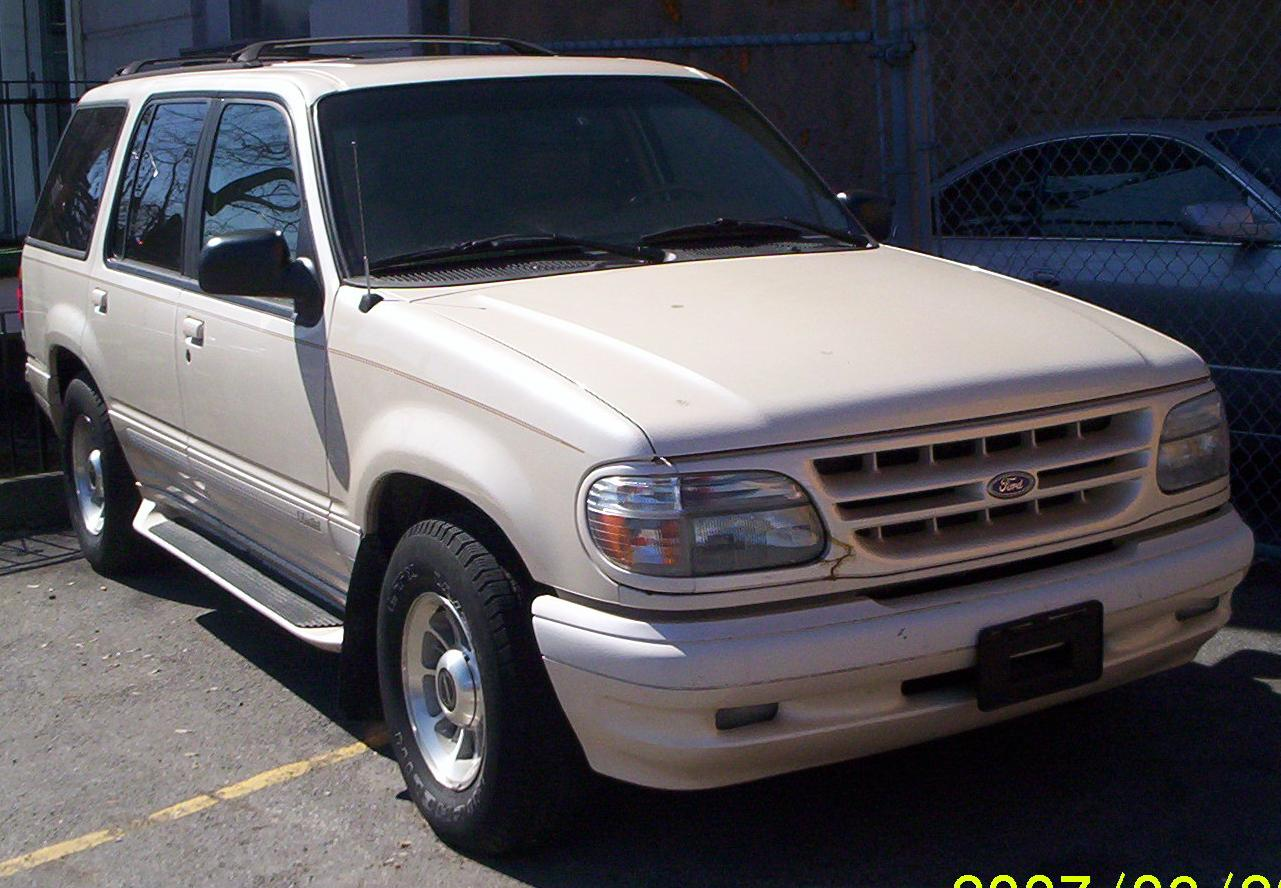
1995–1997 Ford Explorer Limited

At its launch, the second-generation Ford Explorer retained the use of the previous trim nomenclature; the standard trim was the XL, with the XLT serving as the primary model upgrade. Along with the two-tone Eddie Bauer trim, the highest trim Explorer was the monochromatic Ford Explorer Limited. For 2000, XLS replaced XL as the base trim (introduced as an appearance package for 1999).

In contrast to five-door Explorers, second-generation three-door Ford Explorers shifted to a separate trim nomenclature. While the XL remained the base model (largely for fleets), most examples were produced under a single Sport trim level (again equipped similarly to the XLT). For 1995, Ford replaced the 3-door Eddie Bauer with the Expedition trim; in anticipation of the full-size Ford Expedition SUV, the trim line was withdrawn for the 1996 model year.

For 1999, all three-door Explorers became Explorer Sports; the model was produced alongside the third-generation Explorer through the 2003 model year.

=== Epilogue ===
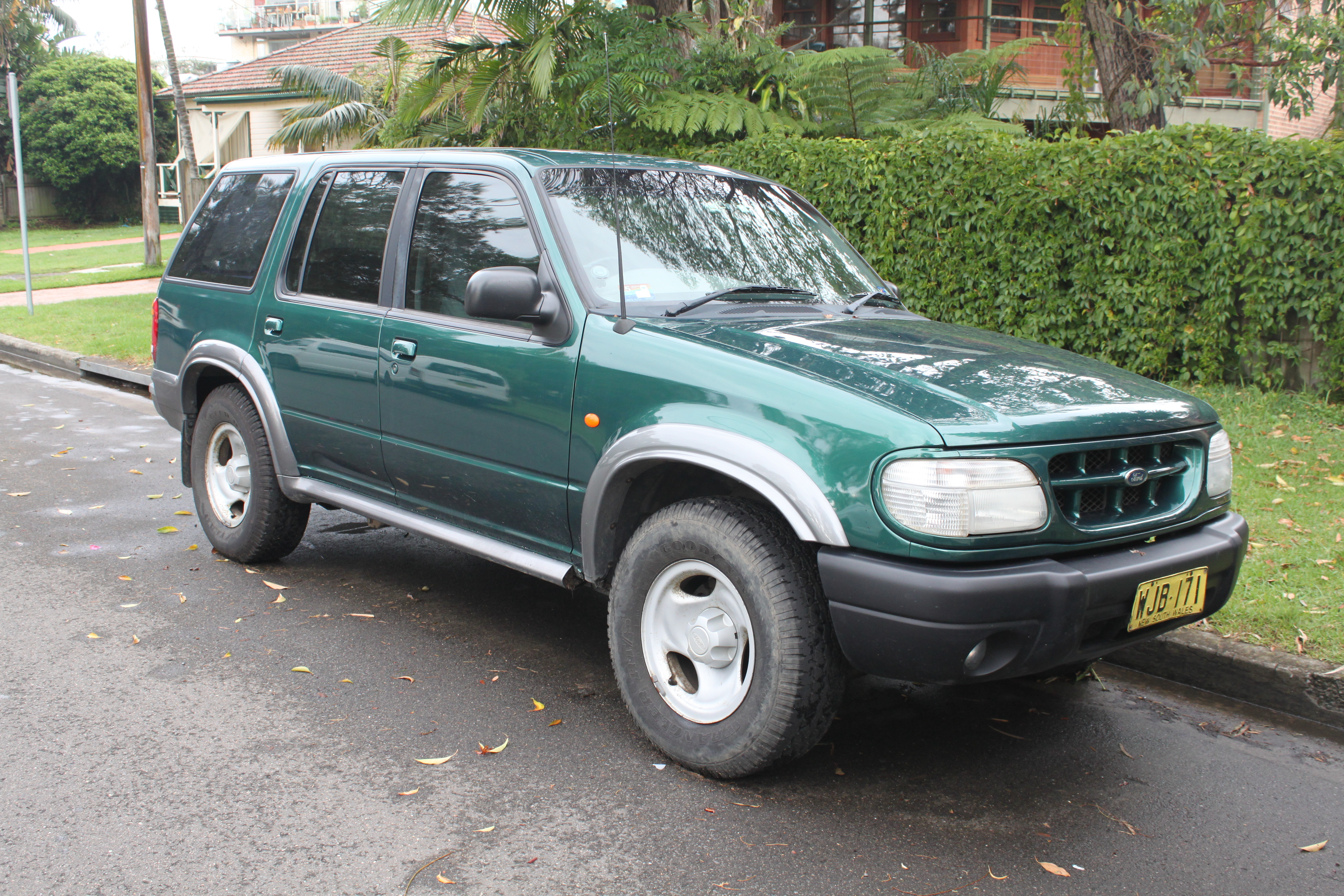
1999 Ford Explorer XL (UQ) 5-door (Australia, RHD)

Outside of North America, this generation of the Explorer was marketed in right-hand drive configurations. As of 2018, RHD countries (such as Japan) export used examples of the Explorer to other countries (such as Australia and New Zealand) where there is demand for right-hand drive SUVs. Due to Japan's strict Shaken Laws, used vehicles tend to have low mileage with detailed repair histories.

In the United States, the second-generation Ford Explorer has the (dubious) distinction of being two of the top five vehicles traded-in under the 2009 "Cash for Clunkers" program, with the 4WD model topping the list and the 2WD model coming in at number 4.

== Third generation (U152; 2002) ==
Third generation
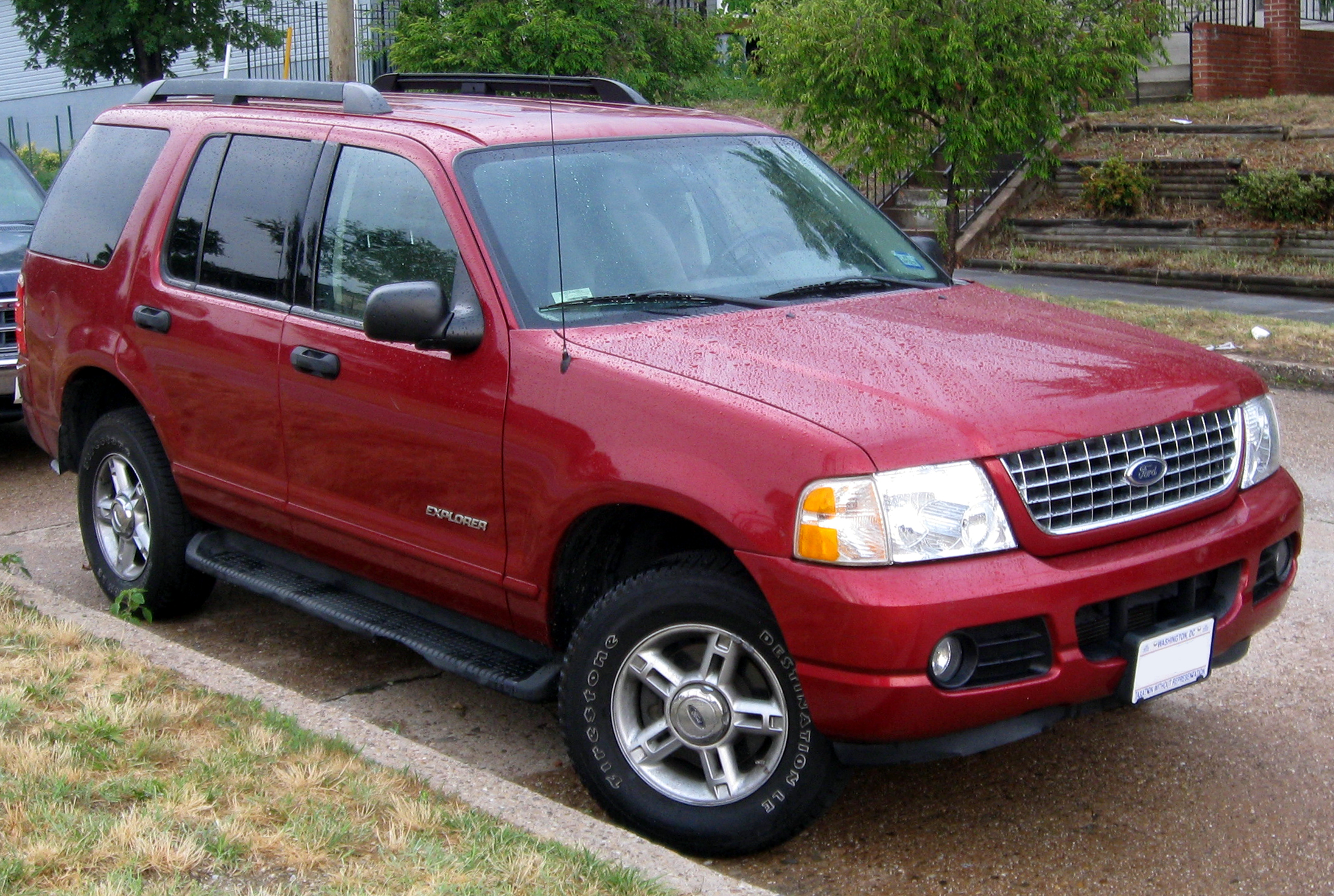

Overview
- Model code: U152
- Production: November 2000 – June 2005
- Model years: 2002–2005
- Assembly: United States: Louisville, Kentucky (Louisville Assembly Plant); St. Louis, Missouri (St. Louis Assembly); Venezuela: Valencia, Carabobo (Valencia Assembly)
- Designer: Edward Golden (1997)

Body and chassis
- Body style: 4-door SUV
- Layout: Front engine, rear-wheel drive / four-wheel drive / all-wheel drive
- Related: Lincoln Aviator; Mercury Mountaineer

Powertrain
- Engine: Gasoline: 4.0 L Cologne V6; 4.6 L 16-valve Modular V8
- Transmission: 5-speed M5OD-R4 manual 5-speed 5R55W automatic 5-speed 5R55S automatic

Dimensions
- Wheelbase: 2002–03: 113.7 in (2,888 mm); 2004–05: 113.8 in (2,891 mm)
- Length: 189.5 in (4,813 mm)
- Width: 72.1 in (1,831 mm)
- Height: 71.4 in (1,814 mm)

The third-generation Ford Explorer went on sale in January 2001 for the 2002 model year. Undergoing the first complete redesign since its introduction, the Explorer ended its direct model commonality with the Ford Ranger in favor of a purpose-built SUV design. Following a decline in demand for three-door SUVs, Ford developed the third-generation Explorer solely as a five-door wagon; the three-door Explorer Sport from the second generation continued production through the 2003 model year.

The primary objective behind the development of the model line was to make the Explorer more competitive in both domestic and export markets. Along with tuning the vehicle for higher-speed European driving, Ford also benchmarked the model line against the Lexus RX300 and the (then-in-development) Volkswagen Touareg. The Lincoln-Mercury division marketed the third-generation Explorer, with Mercury introducing a second generation of the Mercury Mountaineer; Lincoln offered its first version of the Explorer, marketing the Lincoln Aviator from 2003 until 2005.

=== Chassis ===
The third-generation Explorer (design code U152) marked a major change in the model line, ending chassis commonality with the Ford Ranger. While still retaining body-on-frame construction, the U152 chassis was developed specifically for the third-generation Explorer (and its Lincoln-Mercury counterparts). The wheelbase was extended slightly, to 113.7 inches. Along with rear-wheel drive, the third-generation Explorer was offered with both four-wheel drive and permanent all-wheel drive.

Following the redesign of the front suspension of the previous-generation Explorer, Ford redesigned the suspension layout of the rear axle, replacing the leaf-sprung live rear axle with an independent rear axle located by two half-shafts (similar to the Ford MN12 chassis). The 4-wheel independent configuration was a first for Ford Motor Company trucks and American-market SUVs (with the exception of the HMMWV-derived Hummer H1). As with the previous generation, four-wheel disc brakes were standard with an anti-lock braking system.

==== Powertrain ====
Carried over from the previous generation, a 210 hp 4.0 L V6 was the standard engine. The 5.0 L V8 of the previous generation was retired, with the Explorer adopting a 239 hp 4.6 L Modular V8 as its optional engine (shared with the Ford Crown Victoria/Mercury Grand Marquis); the Explorer was the final V8-powered American Ford to adopt the 4.6 L engine.

For 2002, a 5-speed manual transmission was standard equipment with the 4.0 L V6, the final year a manual transmission was offered for the model line. From 2003 through 2005, the Ford 5R55 5-speed automatic transmission (previously optional for the 4.0 L V6) was paired with the 4.0 L V6 and the 4.6 L V8.

Third-generation (U152) Ford Explorer powertrain details
Engine name	Production	Engine Configuration	Output		Transmission
Engine name	Production	Engine Configuration	Power	Torque	Transmission
Ford Cologne V6	2002–2005	245 cu in (4.0 L) SOHC 12V V6	210 hp (157 kW)	254 lb⋅ft (344 N⋅m)	Mazda M5OD-R4 5-speed manual (2002 only) Ford 5R55 5-speed automatic
Ford Modular V8	2002–2005	281 cu in (4.6 L) SOHC 16V V8	239 hp (178 kW) at 4750 rpm	282 lb⋅ft (382 N⋅m) at 4000 rpm	Ford 5R55 5-speed automatic

=== Body ===
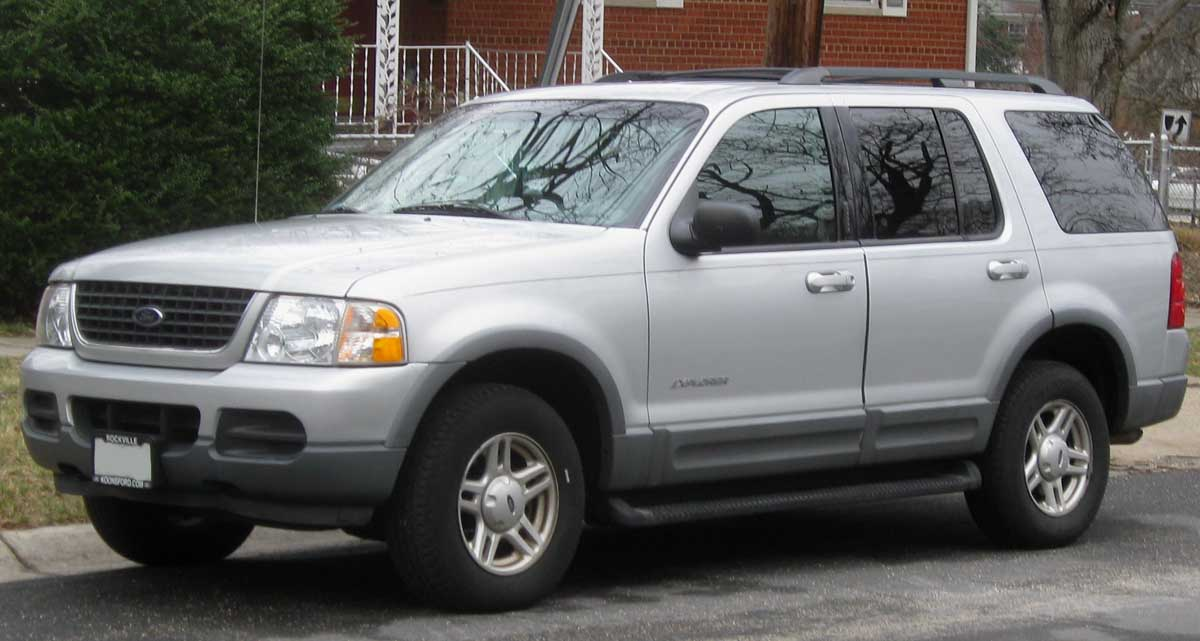
2002–2005 Ford Explorer XLS Sport

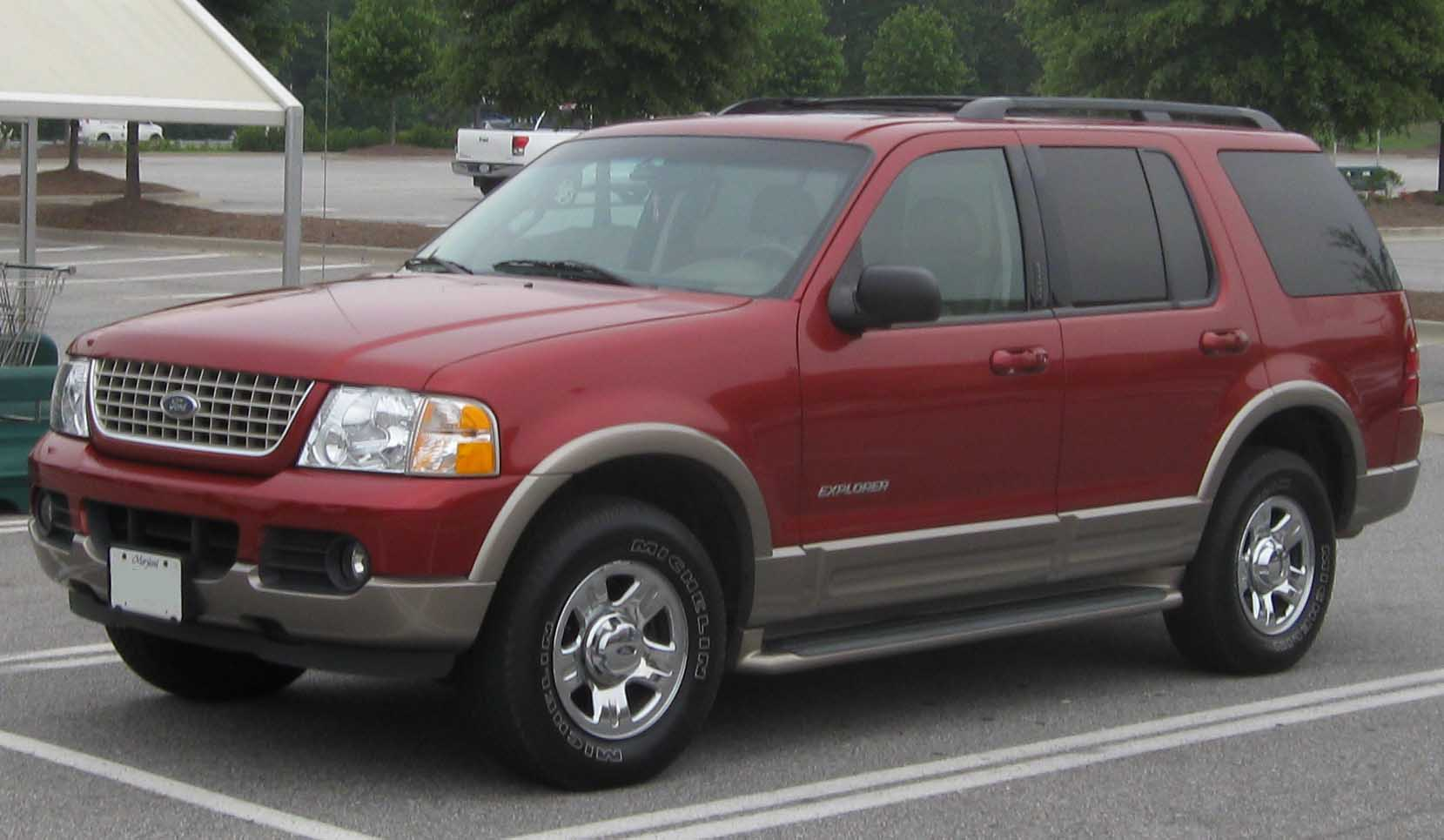
2002–2005 Ford Explorer Eddie Bauer

In contrast with the second-generation Ford Explorer (a major revision of the first-generation model line), the third-generation Ford Explorer was a ground-up redesign (ending all body commonality with the Ford Ranger). Offered solely as a five-door wagon, the model line returned several exterior design elements from previous-generation Explorers (blacked-out B and D-pillars, quarter glass in the rear doors); the grille and taillights were elements adopted from the larger Ford Expedition. The 2002 Ford Explorer introduced a design theme adopted by multiple Ford vehicles, including the 2003 Ford Expedition, the 2004 Ford Freestar, and the 2005 Ford Freestyle wagon and Five Hundred sedan.

Proportioned nearly identically the same as the previous two generations, the third-generation Explorer was an inch shorter, two inches wider, and two inches longer in wheelbase. Several functional changes were brought to the Explorer as part of the rear suspension redesign. The change allowed for a lower rear cargo floor, adding nearly 10 cubic feet of additional cargo space. Offered on nearly all versions, a folding third-row seat was offered as either standard equipment or as an option (expanding seating to seven passengers). For 2004, a rear-bucket seat configuration became an option for higher-trim models, including a second center console (reducing seating to six). Following the design of previous generations, the third-generation Explorer again received a multi-opening rear liftgate, enlarging the rear window opening (covered partially by a filler panel, housing the rear windshield washer).

=== Trim ===
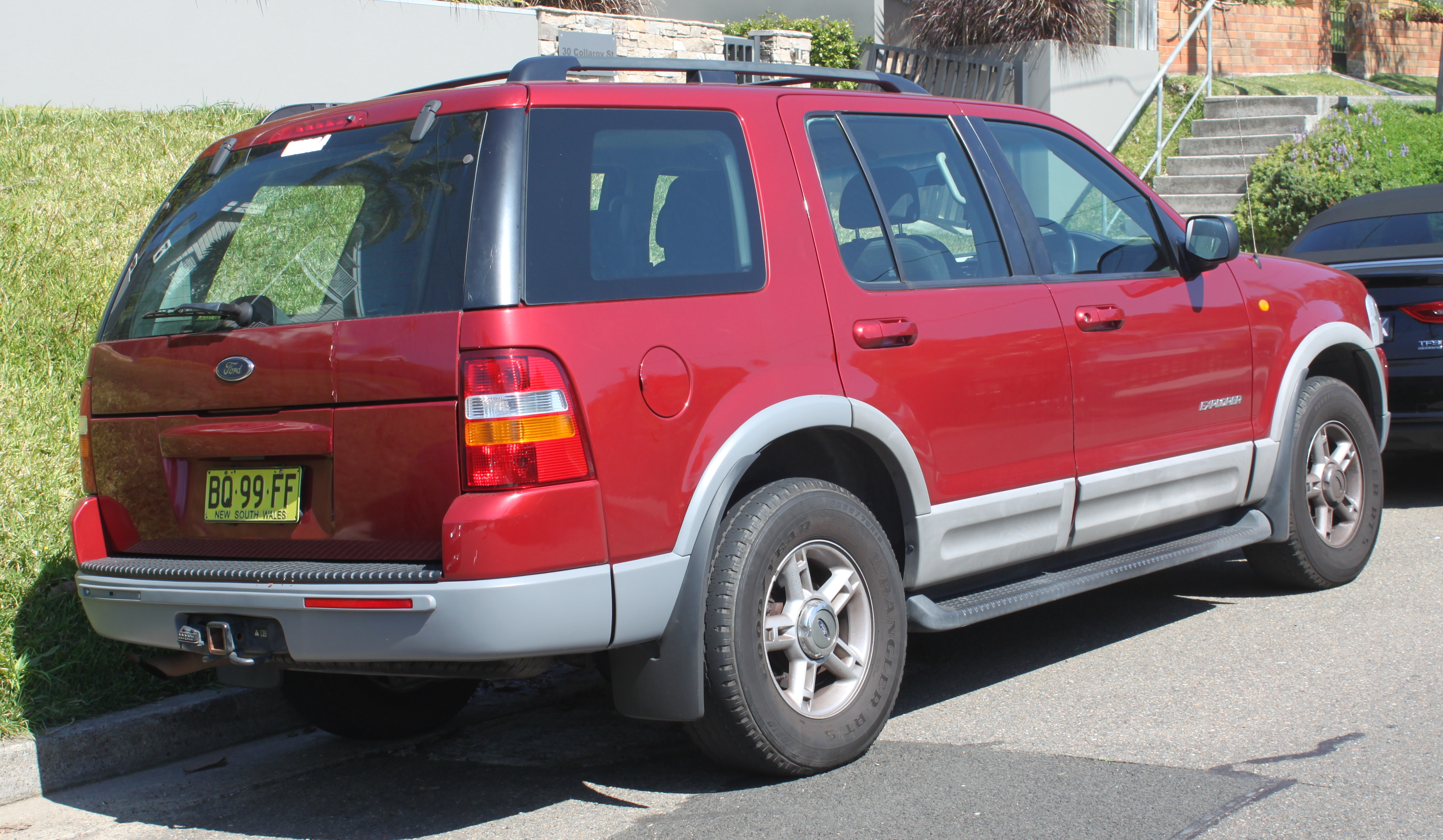
2002 Ford Explorer (UT) XLT (rear view, Australia)

For the 2002 model year, the third-generation Ford Explorer adopted the trim nomenclature of its predecessor. The base trim of the model line was the XLS (intended largely for fleet sale) with the newly introduced XLS Sport, which standardized many options offered for the XLS. The primary trim level of the Explorer was the XLT, split into two versions; the standard XLT received a monochromatic exterior and the XLT Sport received gray lower-body trim and 17-inch wheels. The Eddie Bauer and Limited returned as the highest-trim versions of the Explorer, with the Eddie Bauer distinguished by tan lower-body trim; the Limited was styled with a body-color exterior.

For 2003 and 2004, Ford marketed the Explorer NBX trim. Equipped between the XLT and Eddie Bauer/Limited, the Explorer NBX was an off-road oriented version of the Explorer equipped with all-terrain tires, black bumpers and body cladding, heavy-duty roof rack, and custom seat trim. The NBX was also offered with an Off-Road option package; offered with any four-wheel drive Explorer, the option featured skid plates, tow hooks, and upgraded suspension.

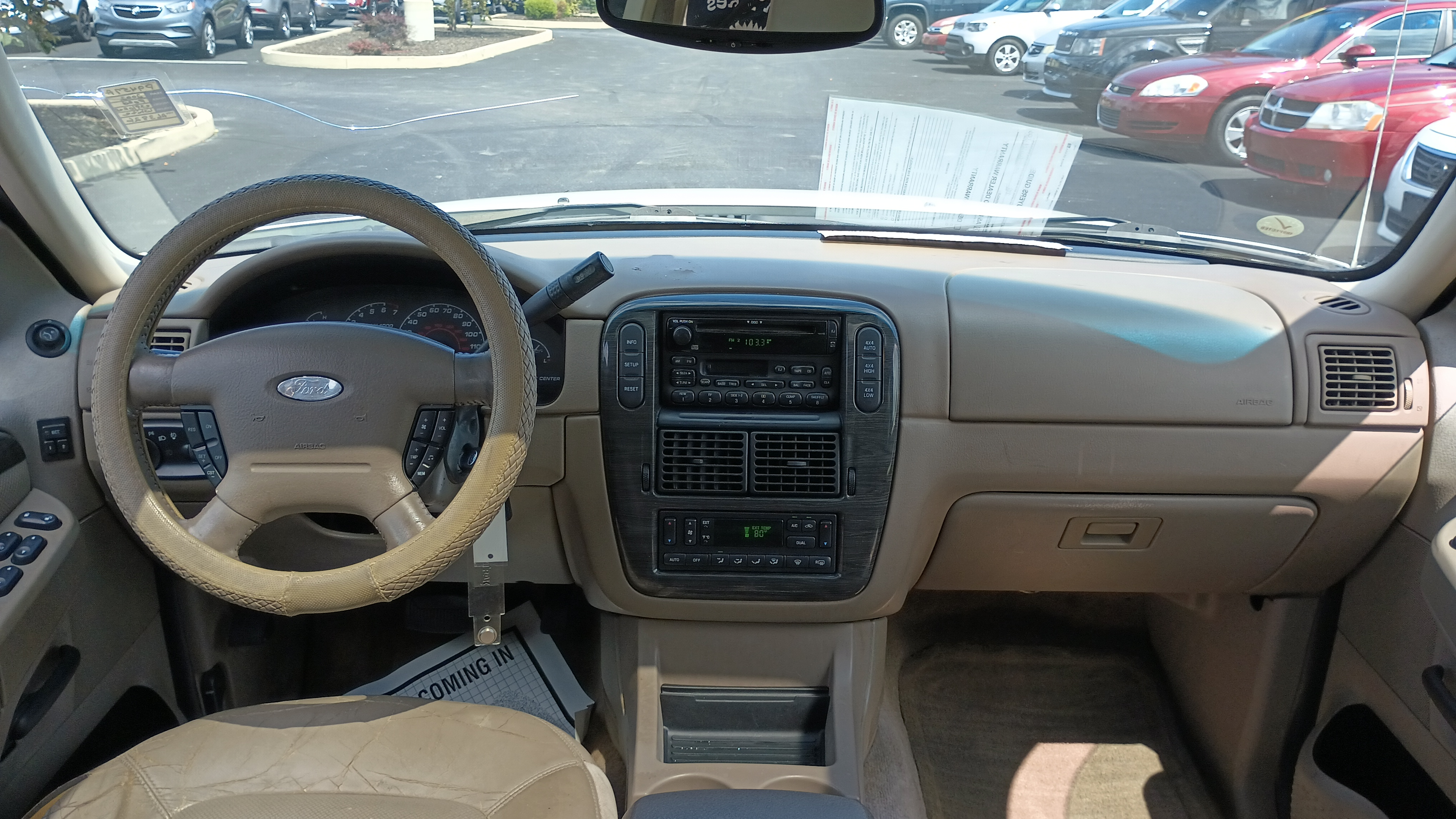
2002 Ford Explorer interior

=== Safety ===
Undergoing development during the late 1990s, the third-generation Explorer adopted safety features in response to the tread separation controversy that affected the previous-generation model line. Along with the deletion of the Firestone Wilderness AT tires, to further reduce rollover risk, the front and rear axles were widened (the latter, coinciding with the introduction of independent rear suspension). As an option, AdvanceTrac was introduced as a stability control system. For 2005, AdvanceTrac was redesigned, becoming AdvanceTrac RSC (Roll Stability Control); included as a standard feature, the system used ABS, traction control, stability control, and yaw control to reduce rollover risk.

In addition to standard dual front-seat airbags, seatbelt pretensioners were added; side-curtain airbags became an option on all versions of the model line.

== Fourth generation (U251; 2006) ==
Fourth generation
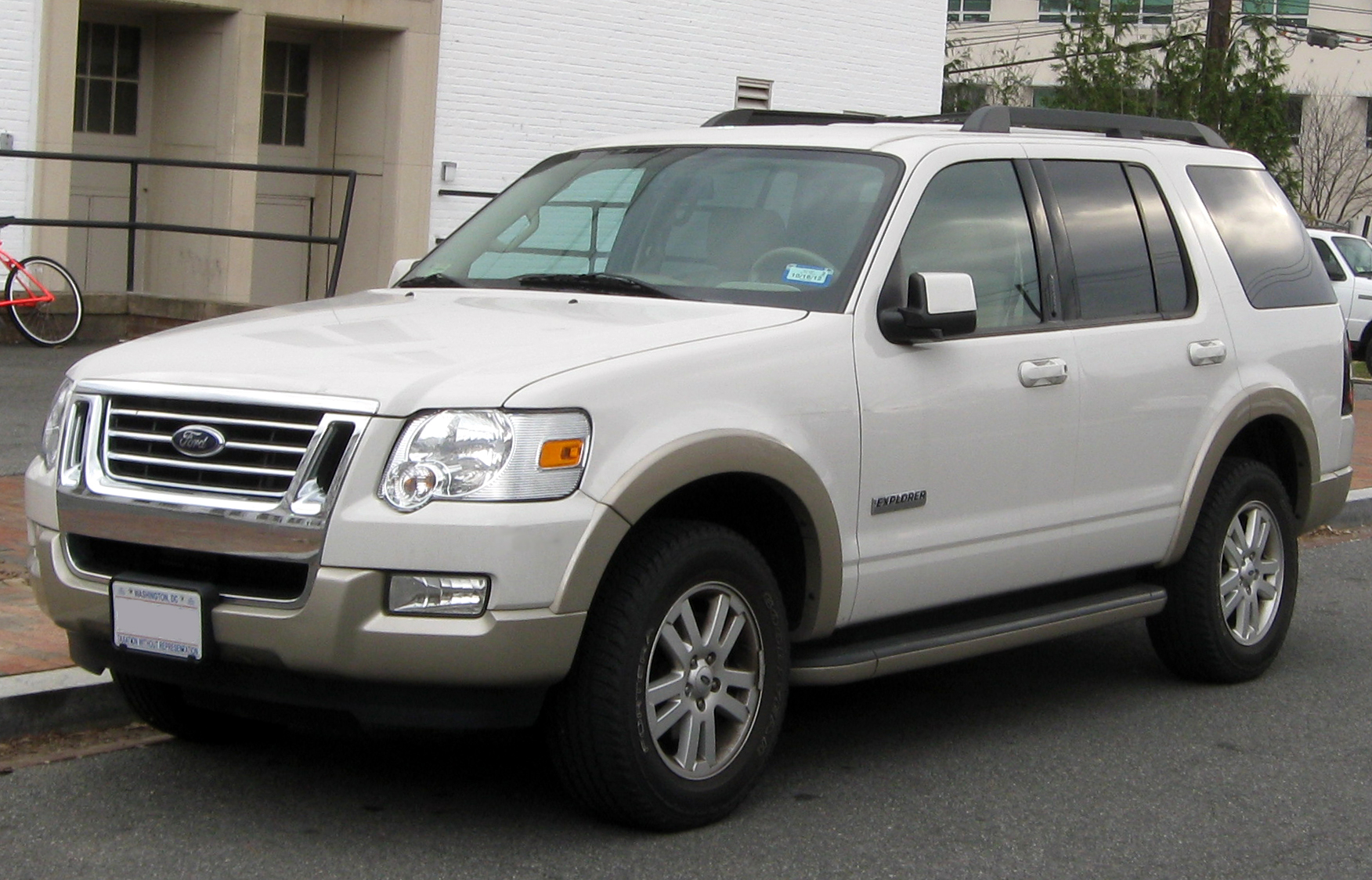

Overview
- Model code: U251
- Production: July 2005 – December 16, 2010
- Model years: 2006–2010
- Assembly: United States: Louisville, Kentucky (Louisville Assembly Plant); St. Louis, Missouri (St. Louis Assembly); Venezuela: Valencia, Carabobo (Valencia Assembly)
- Designer: Jeff Nowak (2003)

Body and chassis
- Body style: 4-door SUV
- Layout: Front engine, rear-wheel drive / four-wheel drive
- Related: Ford Explorer Sport Trac; Mercury Mountaineer

Powertrain
- Engine: Gasoline: 4.0 L Cologne SOHC V6; 4.6 L Modular 24-valve V8
- Transmission: 5-speed 5R55S automatic 6-speed 6R automatic

Dimensions
- Wheelbase: 113.7 in (2,888 mm)
- Length: 193.4 in (4,912 mm)
- Width: 73.7 in (1,872 mm)
- Height: 2006–07: 71.2 in (1,808 mm); 2008: 72.8 in (1,849 mm); 2009–10: 71.9 in (1,826 mm)

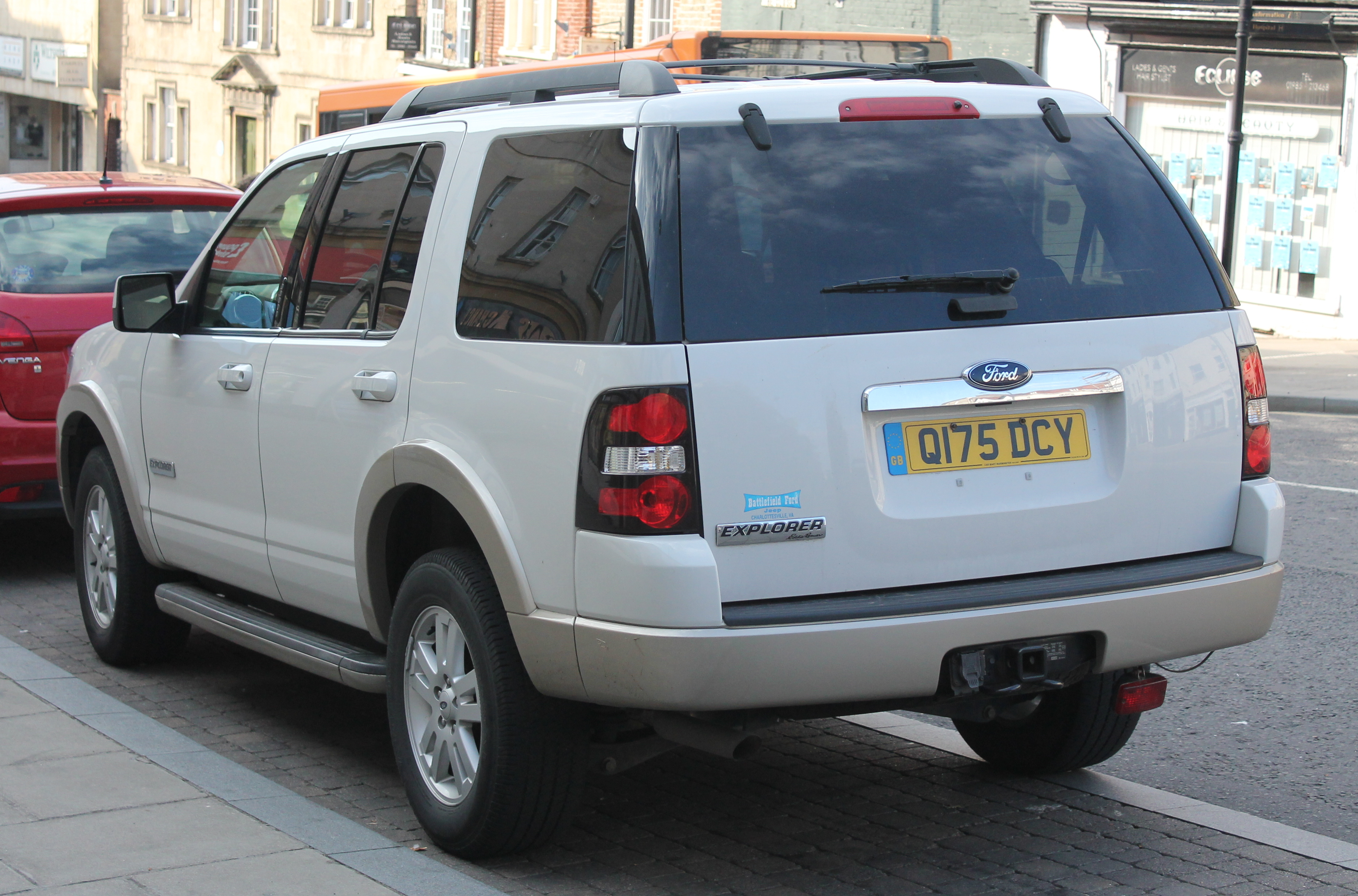
Ford Explorer

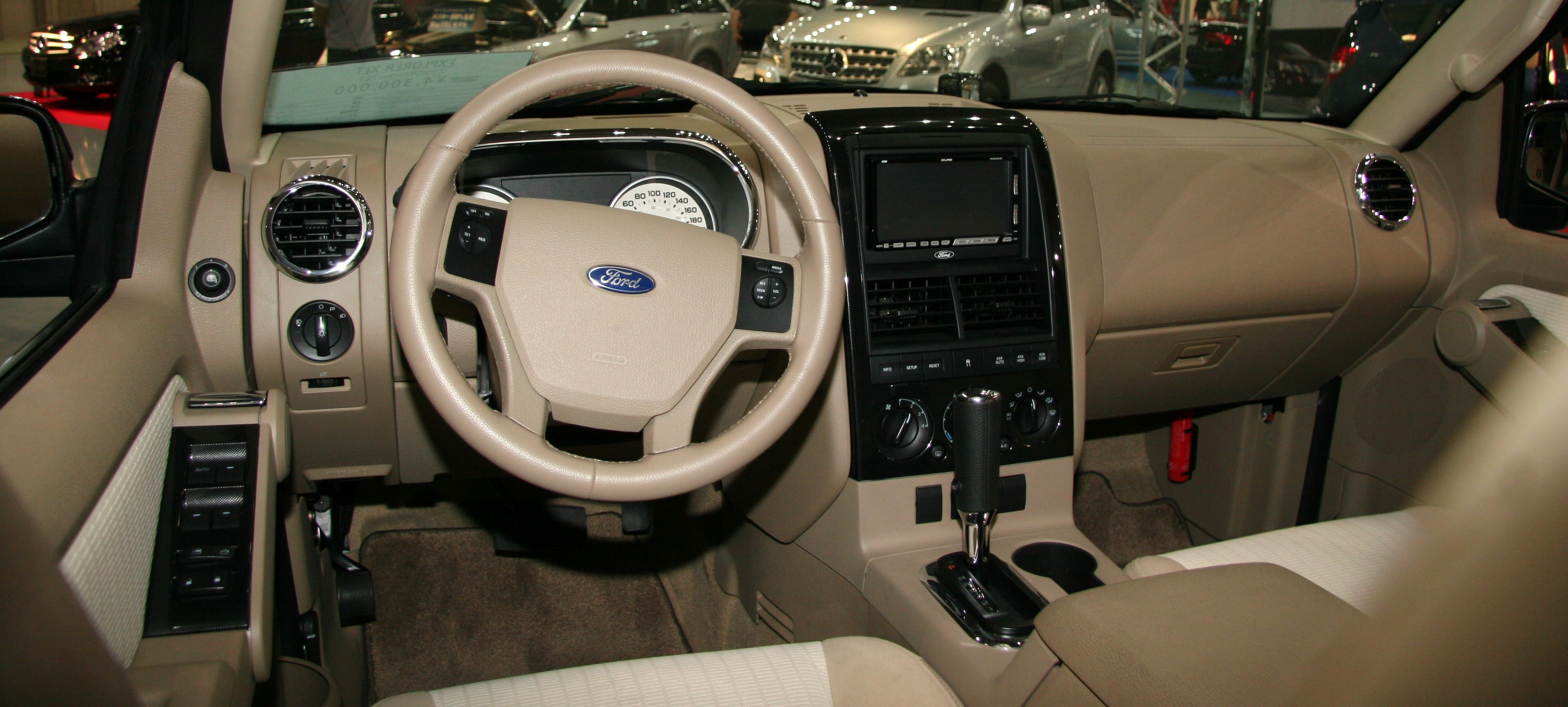
Interior

The fourth generation Explorer entered production in July 2005 for the 2006 model year. While the Mercury Mountaineer also returned for 2006, the fourth generation Explorer did not have a Lincoln Aviator counterpart, as it was dropped following the 2005 model year. Bearing large similarities to the outgoing model, the fourth generation Explorer was marketed as all-new by Ford despite sharing its roof line, overall body, glass, drive-train, and several other major components with its predecessor. In contrast, it rides on a new, stiffer frame produced by Magna International rather than Tower Automotive. Along with this new chassis, Ford updated the front and rear fascias, side profile, interior, and redesigned the rear suspension. Moreover, the problematic two-piece tail gate design from the outgoing model was replaced with a one-piece tail gate design. Also, a tire pressure monitoring system and electronic stability control became standard equipment for improved safety. Unlike previous generations, there was no right-hand drive option available for order, causing Ford to market Explorers in Japan in left-hand drive configuration. The LHD Explorers were desirable there, as LHD vehicles are considered prestigious in Japan.

This generation Explorer would be the last to use traditional body on frame construction. Beginning for the 2011 model year, the Explorer switched to unibody construction. In addition, this would be the last generation of the Explorer to be produced at the Louisville, KY and St. Louis, MO assembly plants.

The 210 hp (157 kW) 4.0 L 12-valve SOHC V6 was once again the standard engine, paired to the five-speed 5R55S automatic transmission. A 292 hp (218 kW) 4.6 L 24-valve SOHC V8, similar to the Fifth-generation Ford Mustang's engine, was available as an option, paired to a new 6-speed 6R automatic transmission, built by Ford and based on a ZF design.

The 2006 Ford Explorer was nominated for the North American Truck of the Year award for 2006.

The fourth generation Explorer was the last generation to also have a Mercury Mountaineer counterpart as Mercury was dissolved in 2011.

=== Model year changes ===
For 2007, The Explorer received a few minor updates including a standard AUX input on all stereos, a heated windshield, an Ironman Package, an XLT Appearance Package, and a heated leather seat package. The XLS trim was also dropped for 2007, and the XLT became the base model. Additionally, the leather-wrapped steering wheel, power driver seat, and dual illuminated vanity mirrors were deleted as standard equipment on the XLT trim. Side curtain airbags were optional on Eddie Bauer and Limited trims, while XLT models were only offered with seat-mounted side torso airbags as standard equipment. Moreover, power-deployable running boards, like the ones from the Lincoln Navigator, were also made available for Eddie Bauer and Limited trims; the running boards lower to allow easier access when entering the vehicle, then retract upon door closure. In addition, the Ford Explorer Sport Trac was also re-introduced for the 2007 model year after skipping 2006.

For 2008, Ford added standard side curtain airbags on all Explorers. Notably, the 2008 Ford Explorer also became the first Ford vehicle to utilize the cap-less fuel filler system, though Explorers were not equipped with it until mid-year 2008. Three new colors were added for the 2008 model year: Stone Green clearcoat metallic, Vapor Silver clearcoat metallic, and White Suede clearcoat metallic. All Explorers now came standard with body-color fender lip and bumper cladding, while Eddie Bauer models received standard Pueblo Gold cladding. In a minor change, the AdvanceTrac badge on the trunk door was replaced with a "4X4" badge on 4WD models. In a reversal from the 2007 model year, a leather-wrapped steering wheel with audio controls, a power driver seat, and dual illuminated vanity mirrors were once again standard on the XLT. In addition, XLT models also now received puddle lights, and a standard overhead console. Furthermore, Ford SYNC was now optional on all Ford Explorer models and the optional satellite navigation system was upgraded with voice control. The Ironman appearance package was dropped after the 2008 model year.

For 2009, the Explorer received a trailer sway control system as standard equipment, and the navigation system received traffic flow monitoring with updated gas prices from nearby stations. Revised front headrests, which improve protection in rear end collisions, were also standard for the 2009 model year. The torque output of the V8 engine increased from 300 lb⋅ft (407 N⋅m) to 315 lb⋅ft (427 N⋅m), while power numbers remained the same.

For the 2010 model year, Ford's MyKey became standard on all Explorers equipped with the Sync system, while V8s were restricted to 4-wheel-drive models.

The last fourth generation Explorer rolled off the assembly line on December 16, 2010.

=== Engine specifications ===
Ford Cologne 4.0 L SOHC V6
Model years	2006–2010
Power (SAE net)	210 hp (157 kW) @5100 rpm
Torque (SAE net)	254 ft⋅lbf (344 N⋅m) @3700 rpm

Ford Modular 4.6 L SOHC V8
Model years	2006–2008	2008-2010
Power (SAE net)	292 hp (218 kW) @ 5700 rpm	
Torque (SAE net)	300 lb⋅ft (407 N⋅m) @ 3950 rpm	315 lb⋅ft (427 N⋅m) @ 4000 rpm

=== Explorer Ironman ===
In 2005, Ford signed a three-year deal to sponsor the Ironman Triathlon. Ford Explorer marketing manager Glen Burke compared the Explorer and the Ironman Triathlon; noting that both had the same attributes of strength, endurance, and passion. The Explorer Ironman debuted on June 25, 2006, for the 2007 model year was an interior and exterior appearance package for the XLT trim. It featured a blacked-out front grille, a protruding silver lower grille with rivet patterns and "Ironman" embossing, a unique rear fascia, Ironman badging, smoked headlights, amber fog lights, blacked-out fender flares with rivet patterns, and unique 18-inch wheels. The interior featured unique heated ten-way power-adjustable two-tone black and stone leather seats, as well as silver trim around the radio and climate controls. Additionally, a leather-wrapped steering wheel was standard. The Explorer Ironman was available in only five colors: Oxford White, Ebony, Redfire, Silver Birch, as well as Orange Frost; which was a unique color only available with the Ironman package. The Ironman could be had with either the standard 4.0 L SOHC V6 or the 4.6 L V8, and in either standard RWD or 4WD configurations. The Explorer Ironman went on sale in September 2006 as a 2007 model, and it was discontinued after the 2008 model year.

=== Ford Explorer Sport Trac ===
The second generation Sport Trac came out in early 2006 for the 2007 model year. Unlike its predecessor sold through 2005, it featured the V8 engine as an option and was based on this generation Explorer's platform. AdvanceTrac with Roll Stability Control was made standard on the Sport Trac.

=== Sport Trac Adrenalin ===
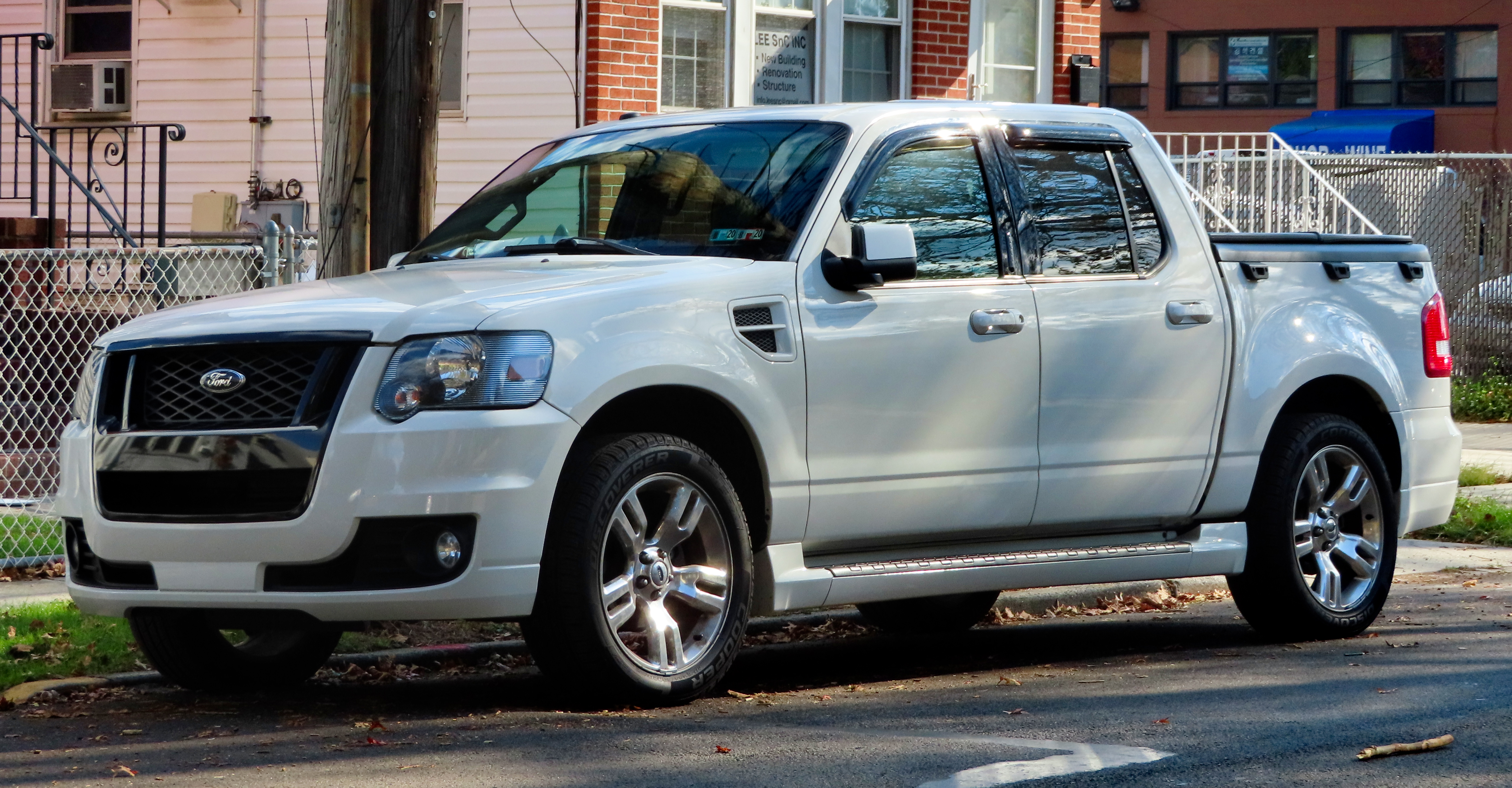
2009 Sport Trac Adrenalin

For the 2007 model year, the Ford Special Vehicle Team built the Sport Trac Adrenalin concept with a supercharged version of the 4.6 L Modular V8, with 390 hp (291 kW), and featuring 21-inch (533 mm) wheels. The model was planned by Ford SVT to be the successor to the F-150 Lightning sports pickup truck. However, the SVT version of the Adrenalin was cancelled in a cost-cutting move as part of The Way Forward. The Adrenalin was subsequently sold as an appearance package from 2007 until 2010. It had blacked-out headlights, black grille, monochrome color interior, unique front and rear bumpers, front fender vents, and molded-in running boards. It also came standard with 20-inch polished aluminum wheels, and the fender flares that came on the Explorer and standard Sport Trac were deleted.

=== Explorer America concept ===
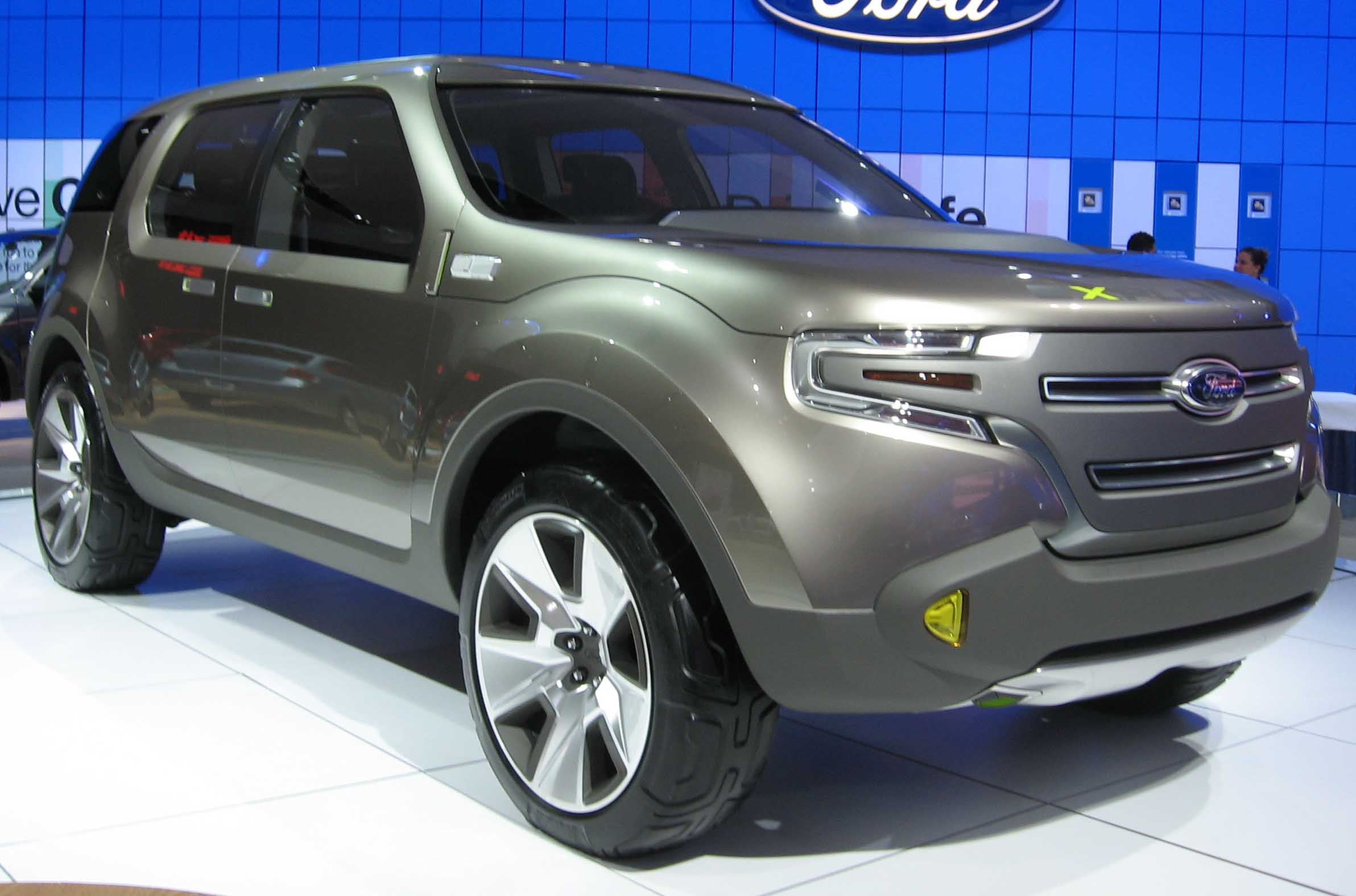
Ford Explorer America concept

Ford unveiled the Explorer America concept vehicle at the 2008 North American International Auto Show. The concept design uses a unibody platform to reduce weight and improve driveability, migrating from the body-on-frame platform of the fourth generation Explorer. It has room for six passengers while improving fuel economy by 20 to 30 percent relative to the current V6 Explorer. The powertrain in the concept include a 2 L four-cylinder turbocharged direct injection EcoBoost gas engine with 275 hp (205 kW) and 280 ft⋅lbf (380 N⋅m) of torque or a 3.5 L V6 version EcoBoost with 340 hp (254 kW) and up to 340 ft⋅lbf (461 N⋅m) of torque.

== Fifth generation (U502; 2011) ==
Fifth generation
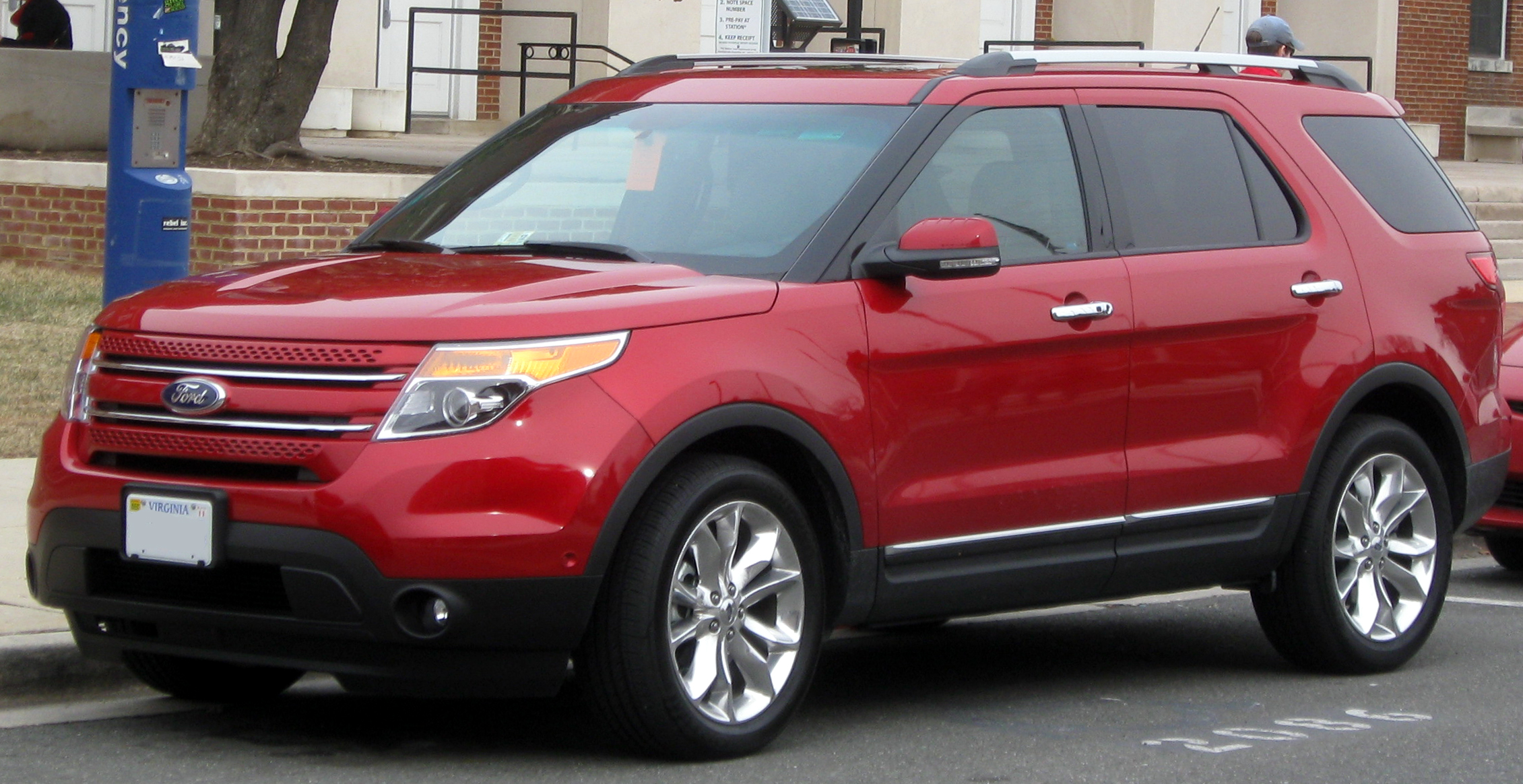

Overview
- Model code: U502
- Production: December 1, 2010 – March 3, 2019
- Model years: 2011–2019
- Assembly: United States: Chicago, Illinois (Chicago Assembly); Venezuela: Valencia, Carabobo (Valencia Assembly); Russia: Yelabuga, Tatarstan
- Designer: Brian Izard, George Bucher (2008); Mike Arbaugh (facelift: 2013)

Body and chassis
- Body style: 5-door crossover
- Layout: Front engine, front-wheel drive / four-wheel drive
- Platform: Ford D4 platform
- Related: Ford Flex; Lincoln MKT; Ford Taurus

Powertrain
- Engine: Gasoline: 2.0 L EcoBoost turbocharged I4 (front-wheel drive only); 2.3 L EcoBoost turbocharged I4; 3.5 L Duratec Ti-VCT V6; 3.5 L EcoBoost twin-turbocharged V6 (all-wheel drive only); 3.7 L Cyclone Ti-VCT FFV V6 (Police Interceptor Utility, all-wheel drive only)
- Transmission: 6-speed Ford 6F automatic w/ overdrive (EcoBoost I4 model); 6-speed 6F SelectShift automatic (3.5L/3.7L); 6-speed 6F SelectShift automatic with paddle shifters (Sport model)

Dimensions
- Wheelbase: 112.6 in (2,860 mm)
- Length: 197.1 in (5,006 mm)
- Width: 78.9 in (2,004 mm)
- Height: 70.4 in (1,788 mm)
- Curb weight: 4,385–4,901 lb (1,989–2,223 kg)

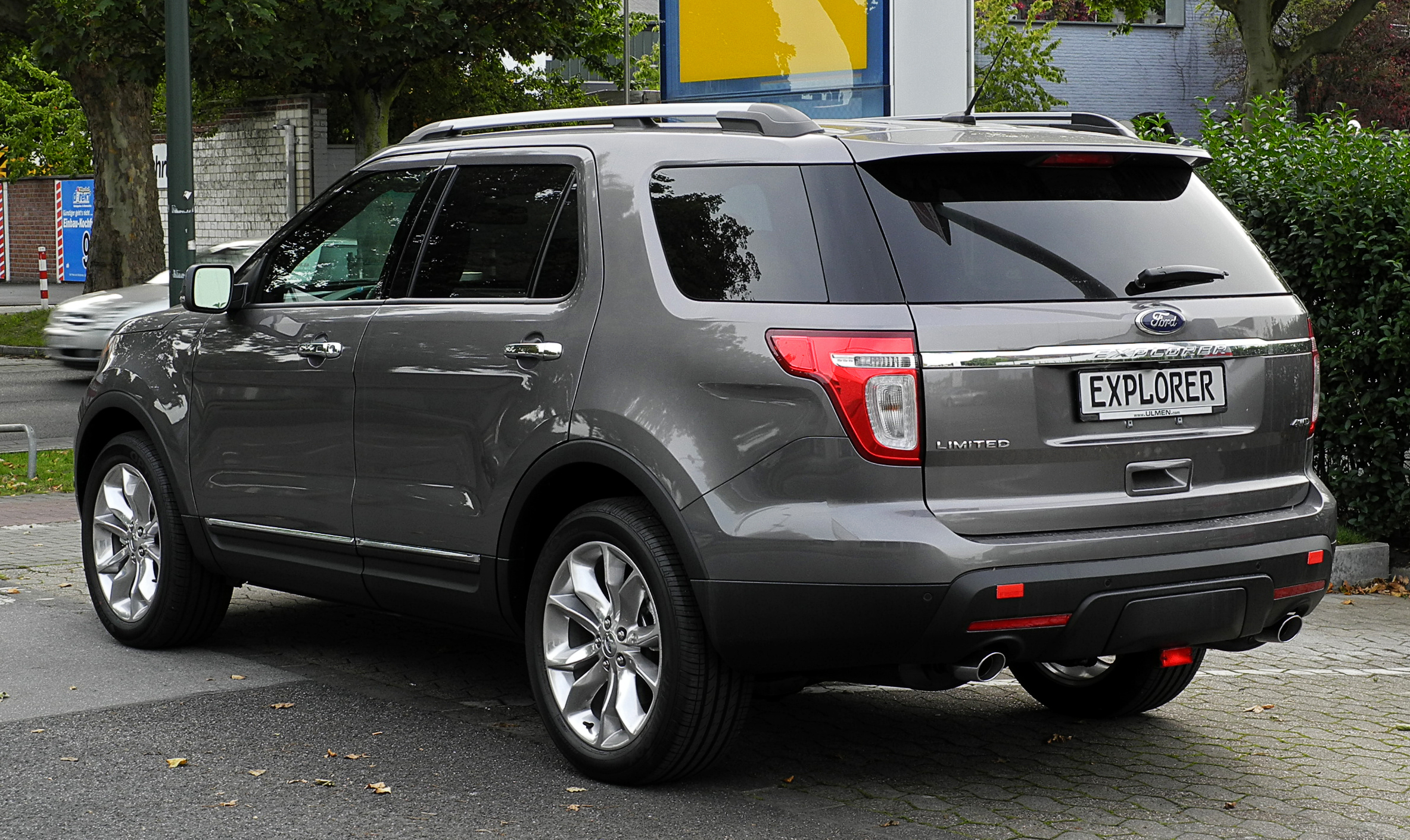
Pre-facelift Ford Explorer

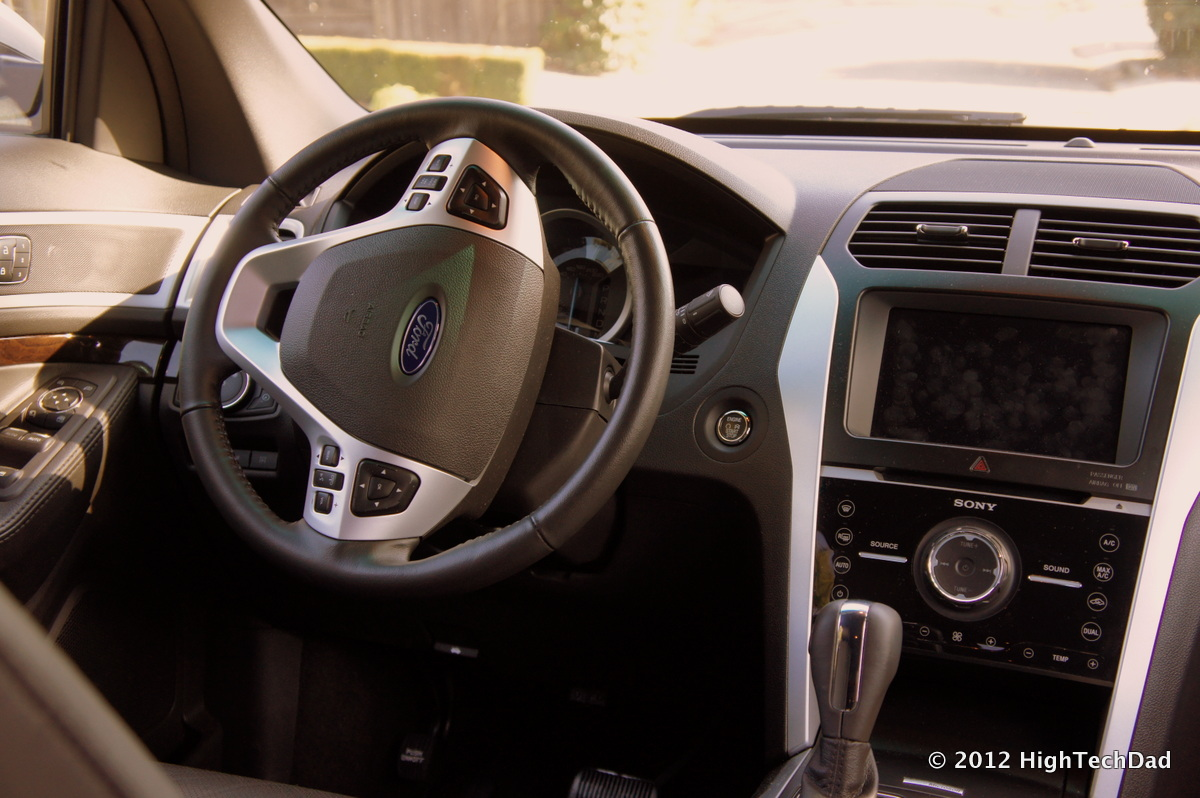
Interior

The fifth generation 2011 Explorer featured a unibody structure based on the D4 platform shared with the Ford Flex and Lincoln MKT — a modified version of the D3 platform.

The fifth generation Explorer features blacked-out A, B, and D-pillars, sculpted body work, stepped style headlamps and tail lamps, and a variant of the corporate three-bar design with upper and lower perforated mesh work.

Chief engineer Jim Holland led the development of the fifth generation Explorer from February 2008 to October 2010, during a period when Ford's Premier Automotive Group also owned Land Rover — for which Holland was also a chief engineer, heading development of the Land Rover Range Rover (L322) 2005 facelift from December 2001 to December 2004. Holland also worked on the Ford Expedition (U324) during its initial development.

Ford presented the fifth generation Explorer on July 26, 2010, via Facebook. Assembly of the fifth-generation Explorer moved to Ford's Chicago Assembly plant commencing December 1, 2010, where it was manufactured alongside the Ford Taurus and Lincoln MKS. The Louisville plant, where the previous generation was manufactured, was converted to produce cars based on Ford's global C platform (potentially including the Ford Focus, Ford C-Max, and Ford Kuga). Like the Escape, Ford continued to market the Explorer as an "SUV" rather rather than a "crossover SUV". It formally went on sale in December 2010, after pre-launch sales had totaled around 15,000 by the end of November 2010. The EPA rated fuel economy of 20/28 mpg city/highway for the four-cylinder EcoBoost engine option.

=== Features ===
Available features on the fifth generation included intelligent access with push button start, remote engine start, power liftgate, SecuriCode keyless entry keypad, power adjustable pedals with memory, premium leather trimmed seating, heated and cooled front seats, dual headrest DVD entertainment system, adaptive cruise control, active park assist, SIRIUS Travel Link, MyFord Touch, Ford SYNC by Microsoft, Sony audio system with HD radio and Apple iTunes tagging, in-dash advanced navigation system, SoundScreen laminated acoustic and solar tinted windshield with rain-sensing wipers, 20-inch polished V-spoke aluminium wheels, and High-intensity discharge headlamps (HID) and LED tail lamps.

Unlike the Explorer America concept vehicle which only seats five occupants, the production Explorer holds two rows of seating with available PowerFold fold-flat third-row seating (like the previous generation) and accommodates up to seven occupants.

=== Capability ===
The Explorer was available in either front-wheel drive or full-time all-wheel drive. At first only one engine was available: the 290 hp (216 kW) (255 lb⋅ft (346 N⋅m) of torque) 3.5 L TiVCT (Twin independent Variable Camshaft Timing) V6 with either the 6-speed 6F automatic or 6-speed 6F SelectShift automatic.

Subsequently, Ford offered the 240 hp (179 kW) and (270 lb⋅ft (366 N⋅m) of torque) 2 L EcoBoost turbocharged, direct-injected I-4 mated to the 6-speed 6F automatic. The I-4 engine was not available with the optional 6-speed 6F SelectShift automatic, and was only available in front-wheel drive.

The Explorer was available with an automatic intelligent all-wheel drive system inspired by Land Rover, featuring a variable center multi-disc differential with computer controlled lock. Conventional front and rear differentials are used with 3.39:1 gearing. The center multi-disc differential controls the front-to-rear torque split, biasing as much as 100 percent of torque to either the front or rear wheels. Depending on the Terrain Management mode selected, the center multi-disc differential's intelligent lock will allow for a 50:50 torque split in off-road conditions. The Power Transfer Unit (PTU) includes a heavy-duty dedicated cooling system to allow the four-wheel drive system to supply continuous non-stop torque delivery to all four wheels indefinitely, without overheating. A "4WD" badge is advertised on the rear liftgate on the all-wheel drive models. Explorer's overall off-road crawl ratio is 15.19:1 with high range – no low range – gearing.

Off-road electronics include Hill Descent Control (HDC), Hill Ascent Assist (HAA), four-wheel electronic traction control and Terrain Management.

Four-wheel electronic traction control (ABS braking) is employed to simulate front and rear differential locks via aggressively "brake locking" the front or rear differentials, transferring up to 100 percent of torque from side-to-side. In the right conditions, the Explorer can keep moving even if only one wheel has traction.

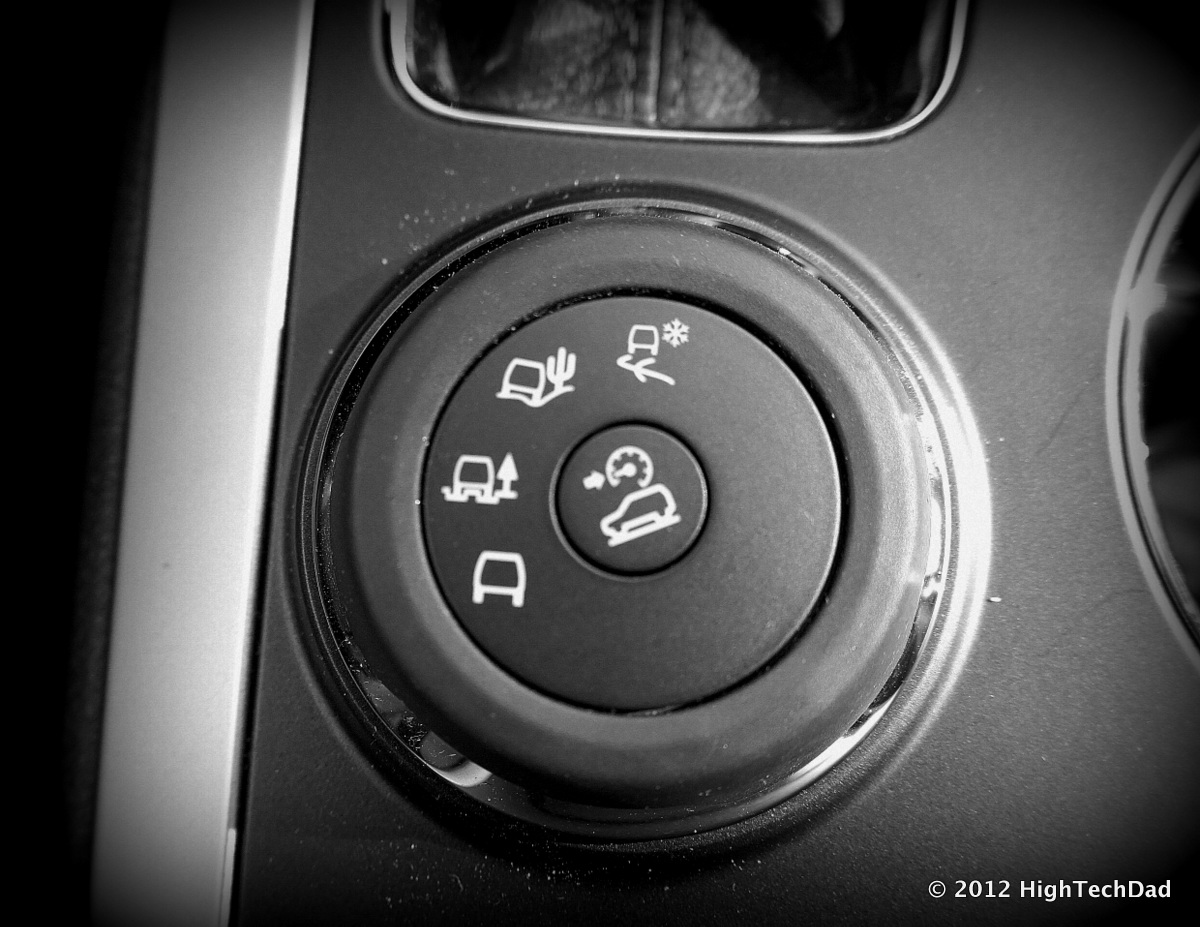
Ford Explorer On Demand

Terrain Management includes four selectable modes. Each mode is selected via a rotary control dial on the center console, aft of the transmission shifter.

Terrain Management System
Default start selection:	Normal Driving mode
Subsequent modes are selected by turning the control dial clockwise.
Second selection:	Mud & Ruts mode
Third selection:	Sand mode
Fourth selection:	Grass/Gravel/Snow mode

Depending on the mode selected, Terrain Management will control, adjust, and fine-tune the engine, transmission, center multi-disc differential lock, throttle response, four-wheel electronic traction control and electronic stability control (ESC) to adapt the SUV for optimal performance on the corresponding terrain.

Off-road geometry figures for approach, departure and ramp breakover angles are 21°, 21° and 16° respectively. Minimum running ground clearance is 7.6 inches (193 mm). Standard running ground clearance is 8.2 inches (208 mm). Low hanging running boards are no longer offered from the factory to help increase side obstacle clearance.

Moving to a monocoque body usually has a negative impact on towing capacity. The new Explorer will be available with an optional trailer tow package. The package includes a Class III trailer hitch, engine oil cooler, trailer electrics connector, trailer sway control (TSC), wiring harness and a rear-view camera with trailer alignment assistance to help in backing up to a trailer. If equipped with the trailer tow package the new 2011 Explorer will be able to tow up to 5,000 lb (2,268 kg) of braked trailer. That is 1,500 lb (680 kg) greater than the towing capacity stated for the Explorer America concept and 2,115 lb (959 kg) less than the outgoing Explorer's towing capacity, although that was only available with the 4.6 L V8 engine.

=== Safety and security ===
Safety features include: Dual front adaptive SRS airbags, dual front-seat side-impact airbags, dual rear safety belt airbags (beginning first quarter, 2011), and side curtain head, torso and rollover protection airbags. Other optional safety features include BLIS blind spot information system with rear cross traffic alert, forward collision warning with brake support precrash system, Auto high-beam, Roll Stability Control (RSC), Electronic stability control (ESC) and Curve Control.

The fifth-generation Explorer was the first-ever vehicle to be equipped with dual rear inflatable safety belts. Airbags are sewn into the inside of the seat belts, and inflate with cold air to prevent burns. Ford claims it will be released as an option and to introduce inflatable seat belts on other Ford models eventually.

==== NHTSA ====
NHTSA Ford Explorer:
Overall (2013–present)	5/5 stars
Overall (2012)	4/5 stars
Frontal Driver	4/5 stars
Frontal Passenger (2013–present)	5/5 stars
Frontal Passenger (2012)	4/5 stars
Side Driver	5/5 stars
Side Passenger	5/5 stars
Side Pole Driver	5/5 stars
Rollover FWD	/ 16.9%
Rollover AWD	/ 17.4%

Ford Explorer IIHS scores
Moderate overlap frontal offset	Good
Small overlap frontal offset (passenger side)	Poor
Small overlap frontal offset (driver side)	Marginal*(2013–2019)
Side impact	Good
Roof strength	Good

^{*vehicle structure rated "Poor"}

=== Awards ===
The fifth generation Ford Explorer earned the 2011 North American Truck of the Year award. The rear inflatable seat belts won the 2011 Best New Technology Award from the Automobile Journalists Association of Canada.

=== 2013 Ford Explorer Sport ===
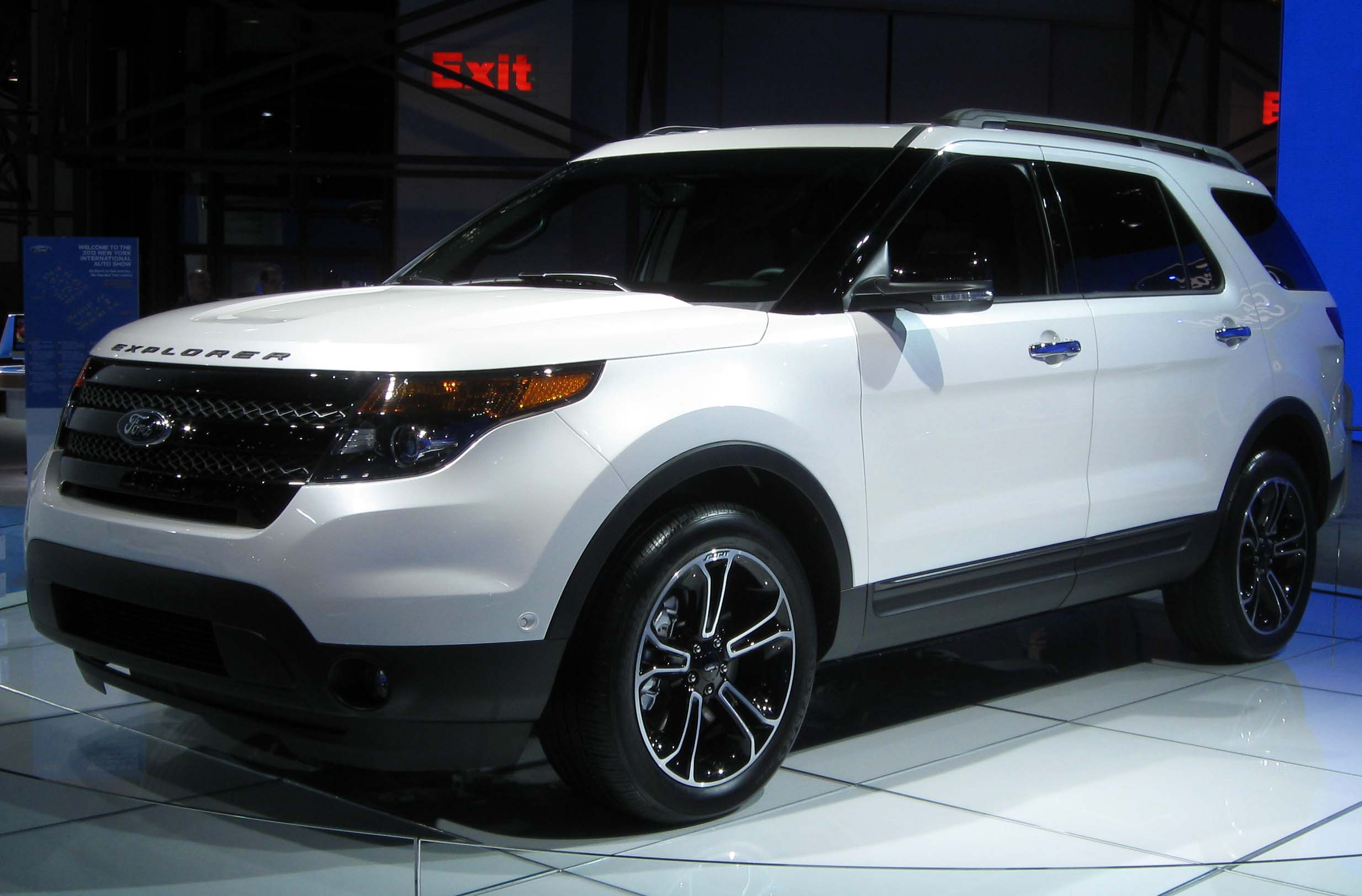
2013 Ford Explorer Sport

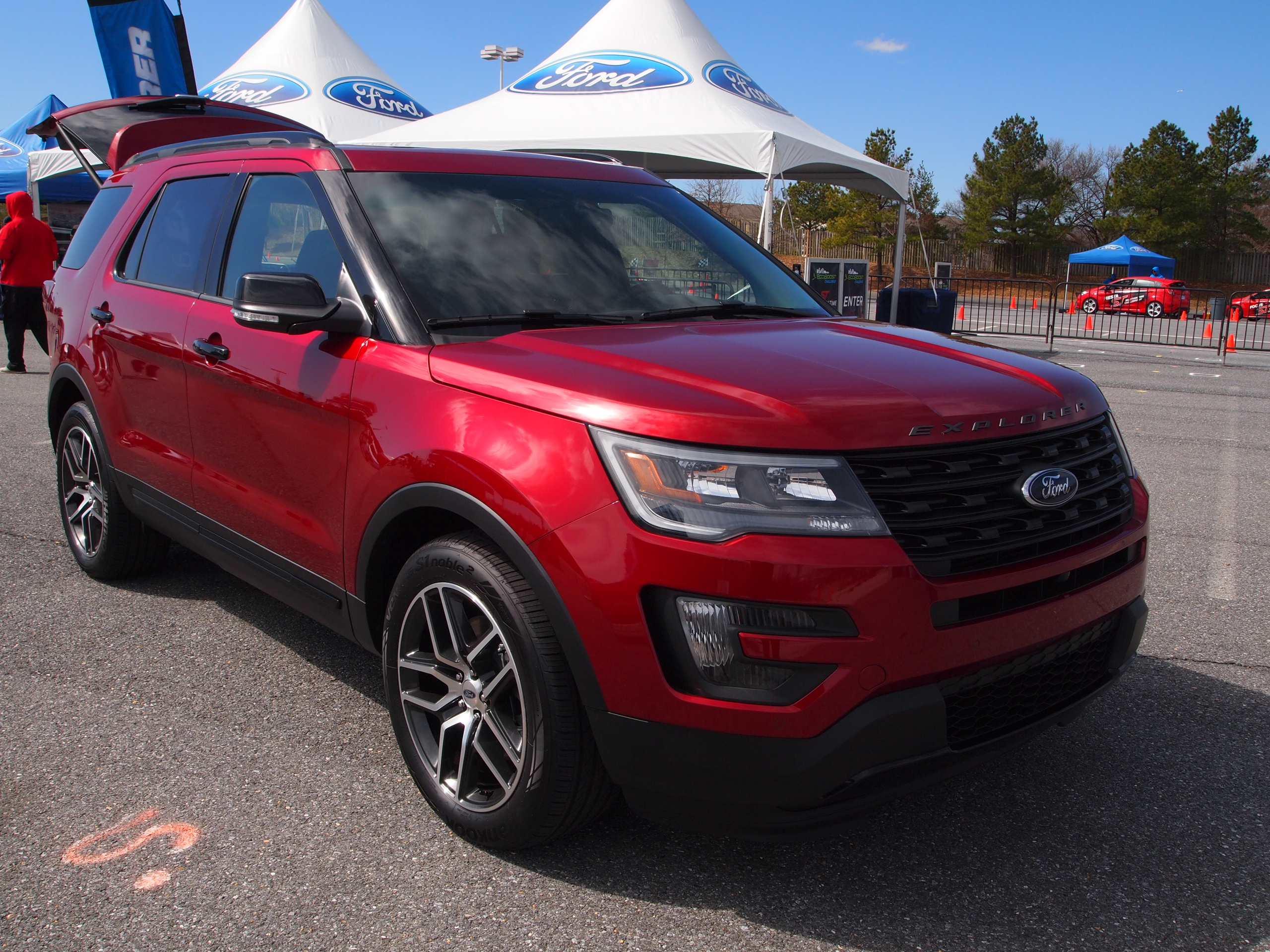
2016 Ford Explorer Sport

The Ford Explorer Sport was announced on March 28, 2012, as an option for the 2013 model year and went on sale in June 2012. The "Sport" trim level comprises blackened exterior treatments, stiffened chassis and suspension, larger brakes and the installation of the EcoBoost 3.5L twin turbo V6 rated at 365 hp (272 kW) and 350 lb⋅ft (475 N⋅m) of torque. It was at the time the only version to feature a combined 4WD/EcoBoost option (an FWD version is not being offered for the Sport trim; 2016+ facelifted models offered the 2.3• EcoBoost with 4WD), allowing its MPG to average between 16/city and 22/highway. This version was slotted above the Limited trim and competed against Jeep Grand Cherokee's SRT trim and Dodge Durango's R/T trims and a newly updated 2013 Chevrolet Traverse, the latter of which unveiled their new look on the same day as the Explorer Sport as their response to Ford's news.

=== 2016 facelift ===
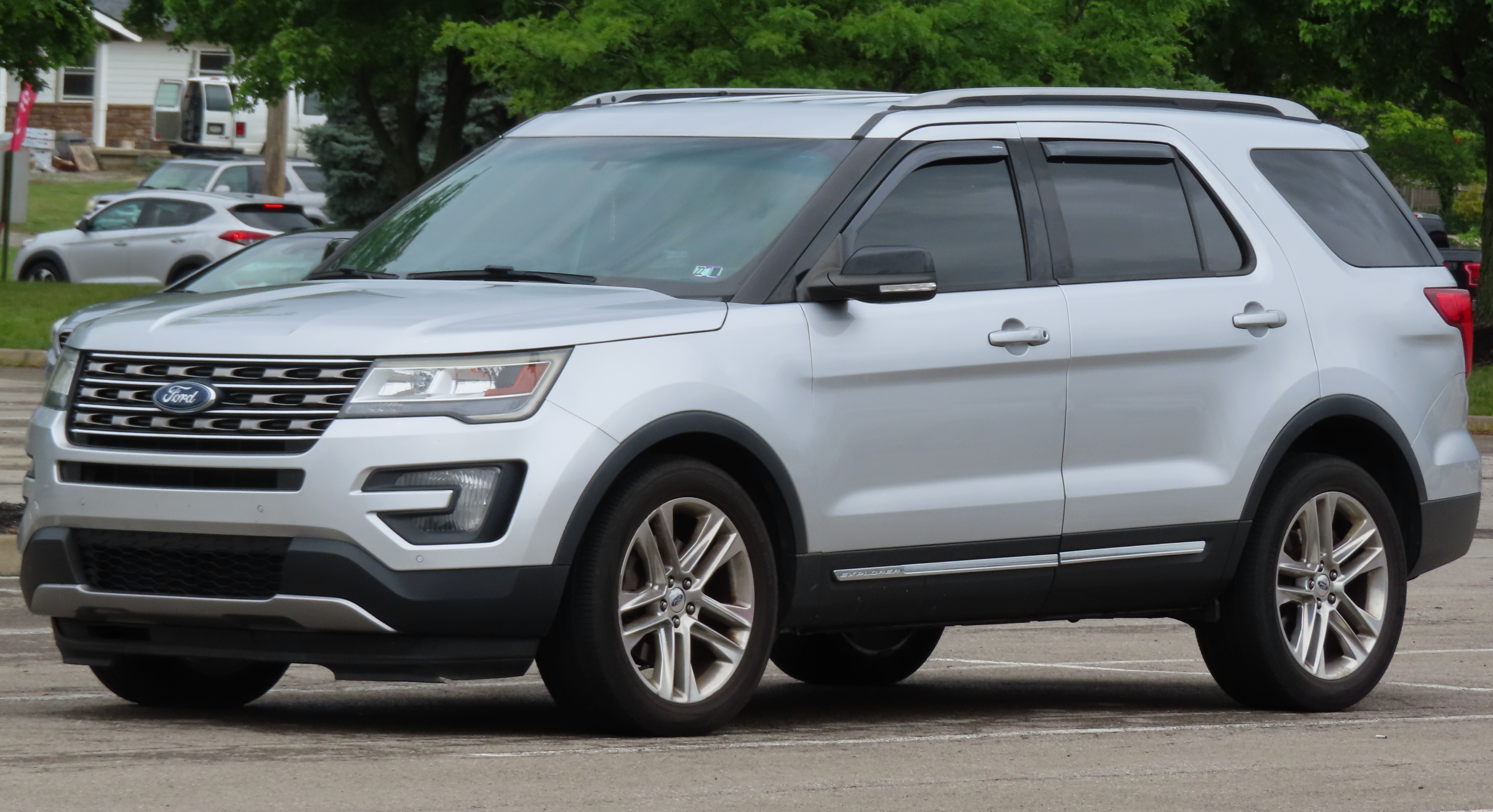
2016 facelift

The refreshed 2016 model year Ford Explorer debuted at the 2014 Los Angeles Auto Show, with a redesigned front fascia, hood, and lower bumper, standard LED low-beam headlights, and fog lamps that were inspired by the thirteenth generation Ford F-150. The rear of the Explorer was also refreshed with restyled LED tail lamps and dual exhaust outlets. The 2016 refresh bumped the I4 engine to a 2.3 L EcoBoost four-cylinder engine from the 2015 Ford Mustang. A newly introduced Platinum trim now tops out the range, slotting above the Sport and Limited trims. Similar to the Platinum editions of the F150 and Ford Super Duty trucks, the Platinum trim features front and rear cameras, enhanced active park assist with perpendicular park assist, park-out assist and semi-automatic parallel parking, hands-free liftgate from the Ford Escape, an exclusive 500-watt Sony surround sound system, and a heated steering wheel. The Platinum is paired with a 3.5 L EcoBoost twin-turbo V6 with 365 bhp (272 kW) which was previously only available with the Sport trim. The 2016 Explorer went on sale at dealerships in the middle of 2015. The base Explorer also received standard eighteen-inch alloy wheels.

=== 2018 and 2019 updates ===
2018 Ford Explorer XLT

For 2018, the fifth-generation Ford Explorer received a front fascia update including new front LED fog lights (not available on the base model Explorer) and a new grille design. Also added was an optional Ford Safe and Smart Package (standard on Platinum models), which gives customers several of Ford's safety features, and the Explorer Sport and Platinum received new quad-exhaust tips.

Moreover, the optional 9-speaker premium audio system previously available on the XLT trim was discontinued and replaced with an optional 7-speaker system. In addition, the in-dash CD player was no longer standard equipment for base and XLT trims. It became optional as part of the XLT Technology Feature Bundle but remained standard on the Limited, Sport, and Platinum trims.

In 2019, the Explorer received one last update before it would be completely redesigned for the sixth-generation Explorer. Explorer XLT models were no longer offered with leather seating surfaces; they were replaced by Ford's "ActiveX" synthetic leather seating surfaces. An XLT Desert Copper Package was also offered, priced at an additional US$1,840. The package included an ebony interior with copper inserts, chrome mirror caps, and 20” Polished Aluminum wheels. Explorer Limited models also received an optional Limited Luxury Package, priced at an additional $1,905. The package included upgraded premium leather seats with unique stitching, premium leather wrapped steering wheel and door inserts, multi-contour with massage capability driver and passenger front seats, inflatable passenger seat belts, chrome mirror caps, and 20” aluminum wheels. These Explorer packages were introduced to celebrate Ford's new record SUV sales at the State Fair of Texas where two Ford Expedition packages (Expedition Stealth Edition and Texas Edition) were also revealed alongside the Explorer.

=== Engines ===
Type	Model years	Power	Torque
1,999 cc (122.0 cu in) EcoBoost 2.0 I4	2012–2015	240 hp (179 kW) at 5500 rpm	270 lb⋅ft (366 N⋅m) at 3000 rpm
2,261 cc (138.0 cu in) EcoBoost 2.3 I4	2016–2019	280 hp (209 kW) at 5600 rpm	310 lb⋅ft (420 N⋅m) at 3000 rpm
3,496 cc (213.3 cu in) Duratec 3.5 V6	2011–2019	290 hp (216 kW) at 6500 rpm	255 lb⋅ft (346 N⋅m) at 4000 rpm
3,497 cc (213.4 cu in) EcoBoost 3.5 TT V6	2013–2019	365 hp (272 kW) at 5500 rpm	350 lb⋅ft (475 N⋅m) at 3500 rpm
3,726 cc (227.4 cu in) 3.7L V6	2013–2019, Police Interceptor Utility	304 hp (227 kW) at 6500 rpm	279 lb⋅ft (378 N⋅m) at 4000 rpm

== Sixth generation (U625; 2020) ==
Sixth generation
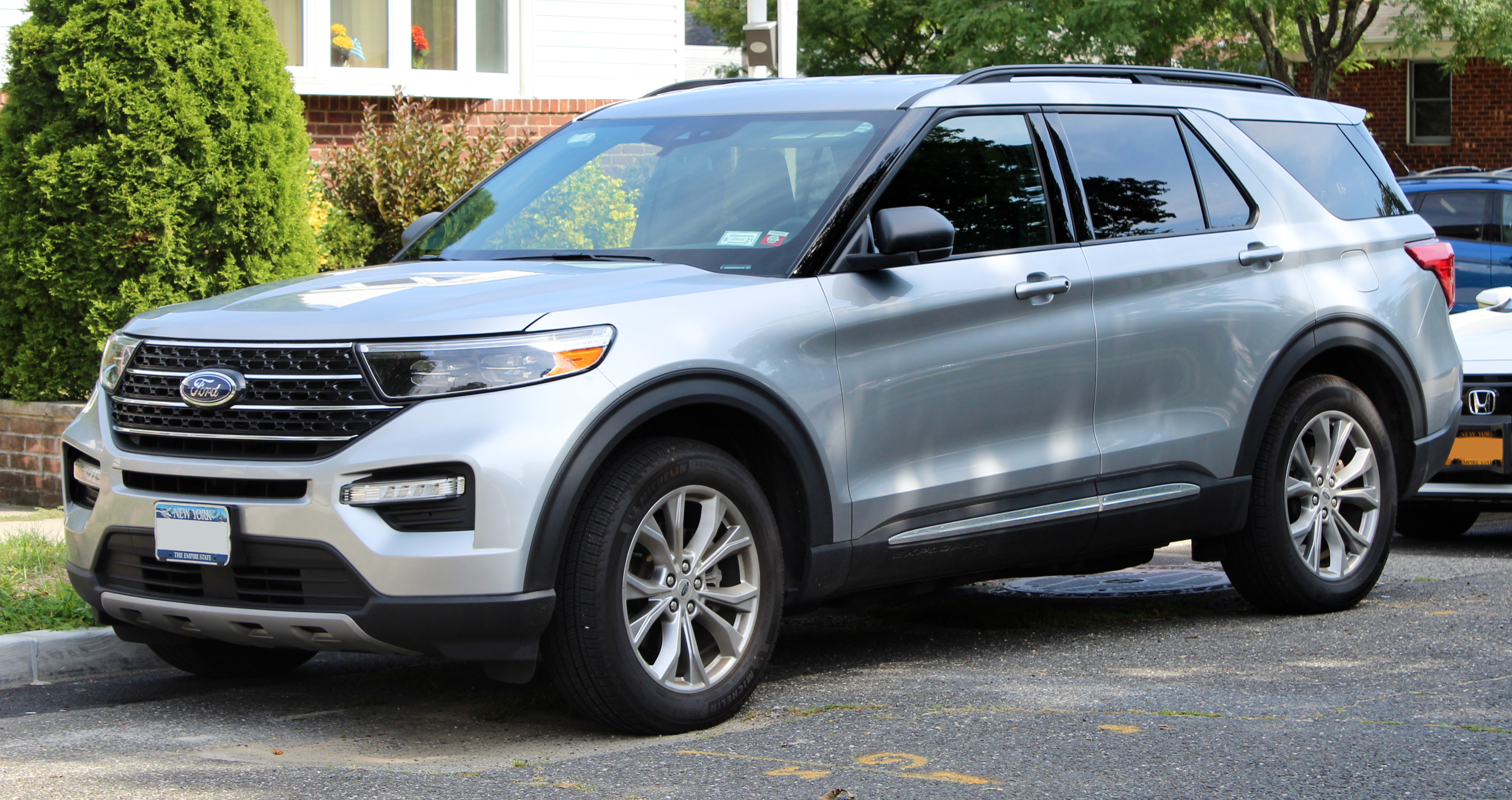
- 2020 Ford Explorer XLT (US)

Overview
- Model code: U625
- Production: May 6, 2019 – present
- Model years: 2020–present
- Assembly: United States: Chicago, Illinois (Chicago Assembly); China: Hangzhou (Changan Ford)

Body and chassis
- Body style: 5-door SUV
- Layout: Front engine, rear-wheel drive / four-wheel drive
- Platform: Ford CD6 platform
- Related: Lincoln Aviator

Powertrain
- Engine: Gasoline: 2.3 L EcoBoost turbo I4; 2.3L CAF484WQMA turbo I4 (China); 3.0 L EcoBoost twin turbo V6; 3.3 L Cyclone FFV V6 (Police Interceptor Utility/Explorer fleet model); Gasoline hybrid: 3.3 L Cyclone V6; Gasoline plug-in hybrid: 3.0 L EcoBoost twin-turbo V6
- Electric motor: 44 hp (45 PS; 33 kW) Modular electric-motor system 102 PS (75 kW; 101 hp) Permanent-magnet synchronous AC electric motor
- Transmission: Ford 10R60 10-speed SelectShift automatic
- Hybrid drivetrain: FHEV (Explorer Hybrid); EcoBoost PHEV (Explorer PHEV)
- Battery: 14.4 kwh Lithium-ion (Li-ion)

Dimensions
- Wheelbase: 119.1 in (3,025 mm)
- Length: 198.8 in (5,050 mm)
- Width: 78.9 in (2,004 mm)
- Height: 69.9 in (1,775 mm)
- Curb weight: 4,345–4,727 lb (1,971–2,144 kg)

The sixth-generation Ford Explorer debuted on January 9, 2019, ahead of the 2019 North American International Auto Show. The 2020 Ford Explorer uses the rear-wheel-drive based CD6 platform shared with the new Lincoln Aviator.

The turbocharged 2.3 L EcoBoost inline-four is the standard engine, with 300 hp (224 kW) and 310 lb⋅ft (420 N⋅m) of torque. It comes with a 10-speed automatic transmission and either rear- or all-wheel drive. Its maximum tow rating is 5,300 lb (2,404 kg). An optional twin-turbocharged 3.0 L EcoBoost V6 makes 365 hp (272 kW) and 380 lb⋅ft (515 N⋅m) of torque, while the ST with the same engine makes 400 hp (298 kW) and 415 lb⋅ft (563 N⋅m) of torque. It also mates with a 10-speed automatic and sees an increase in towing capacity, to 5,600 lb (2,540 kg).

Explorer vehicles purchased by fleet buyers were also given the option to equip their vehicles with a 3.3L V6 gasoline engine.

An Explorer Hybrid is also available in the US with a detuned 3.3 L V6 and 1.5 kWh lithium-ion battery producing a combined 318 hp (237 kW). In Europe there is an available plug-in hybrid version that includes a 350 hp (261 kW) 3.0 L V6 petrol engine, 100 hp (75 kW) electric motor, and 13.6 kWh lithium-ion battery for a combined output of 450 hp (336 kW) and 600 lb⋅ft (813 N⋅m). It will have a fuel consumption of 3.4 L/100 km (83.1 mpg_{‑imp}; 69.2 mpg_{‑US}) and can tow 2,500 kg (5,512 lb).

The 2020 Explorer comes in four trim levels: XLT, Limited, ST (replacing the previous generation's Sport trim), and Platinum. The unnamed Base trim level is marketed primarily to fleet buyers, and will not be available for retail sale.

Thousands of initial Explorer and Aviator vehicles were shipped to Ford's Flat Rock Assembly Plant for repairs due to quality control problems. Later models have been shipped from the Chicago plant to dealerships; however, many required dealer repairs before they could be sold. Consumer Reports noted their purchased Aviator was having quality problems.

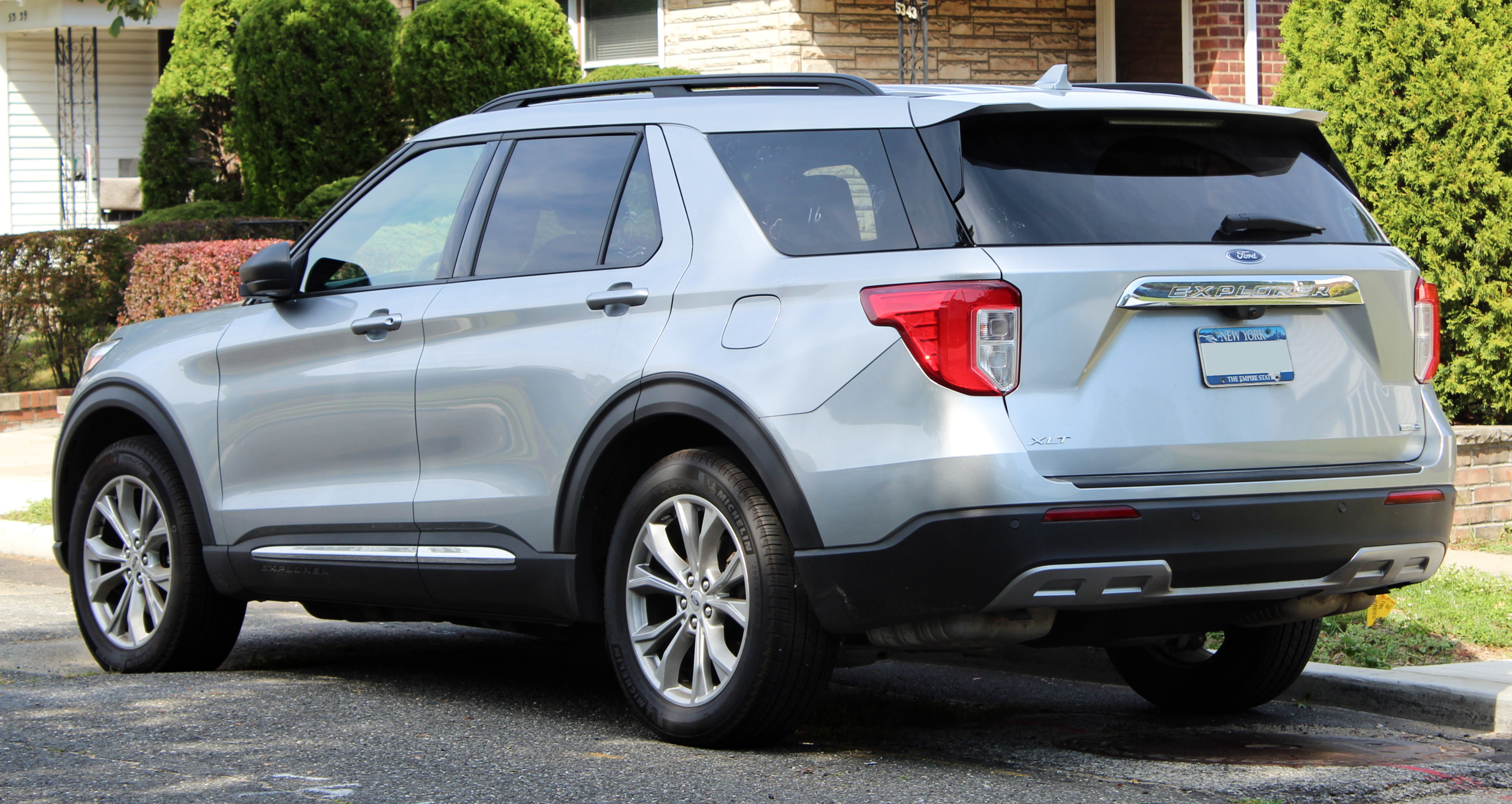
Rear view (XLT; pre-facelift)

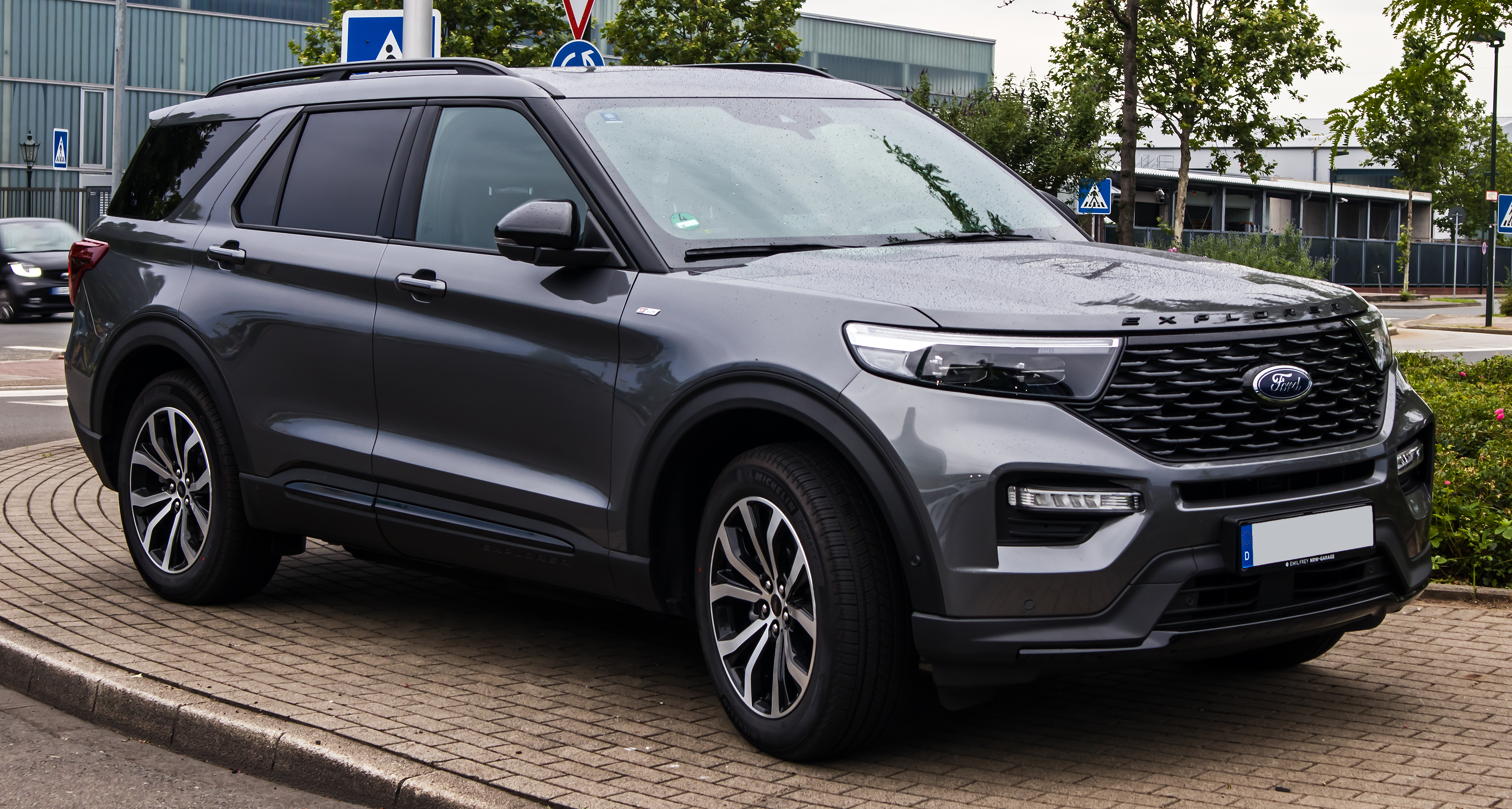
Explorer Plug-in Hybrid (rear; pre-facelift)

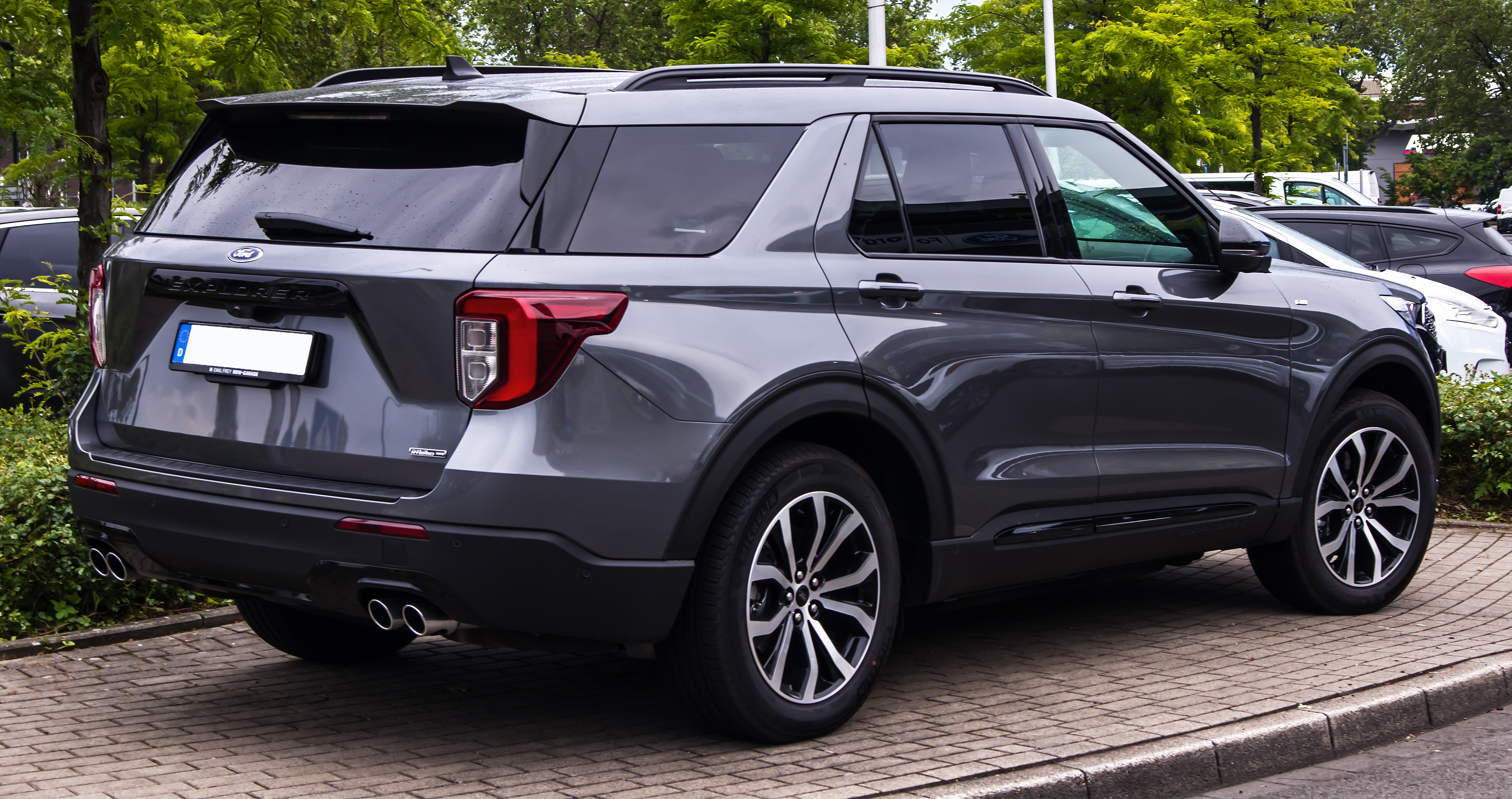
Explorer Plug-in Hybrid (rear; pre-facelift)

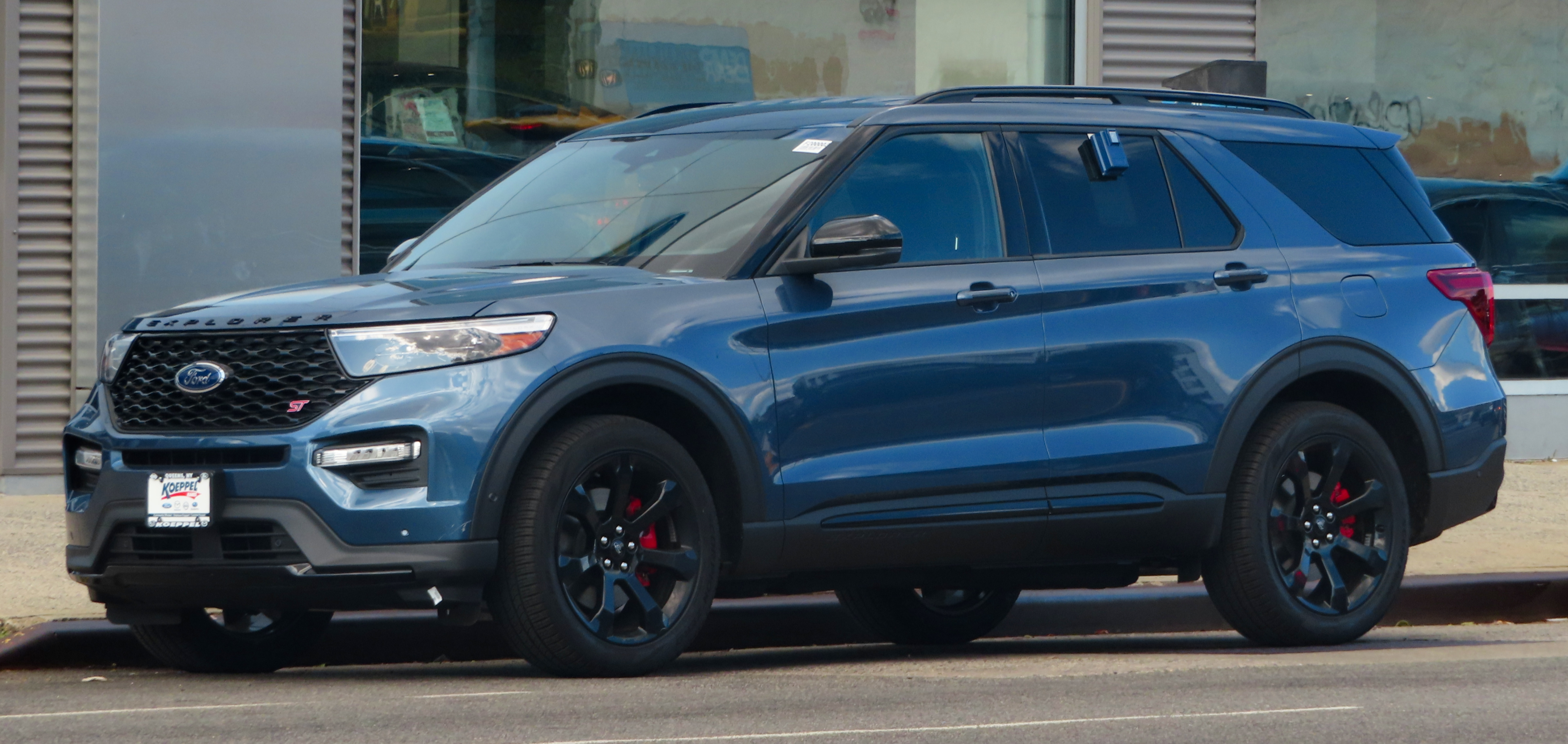
Explorer ST (pre-facelift)

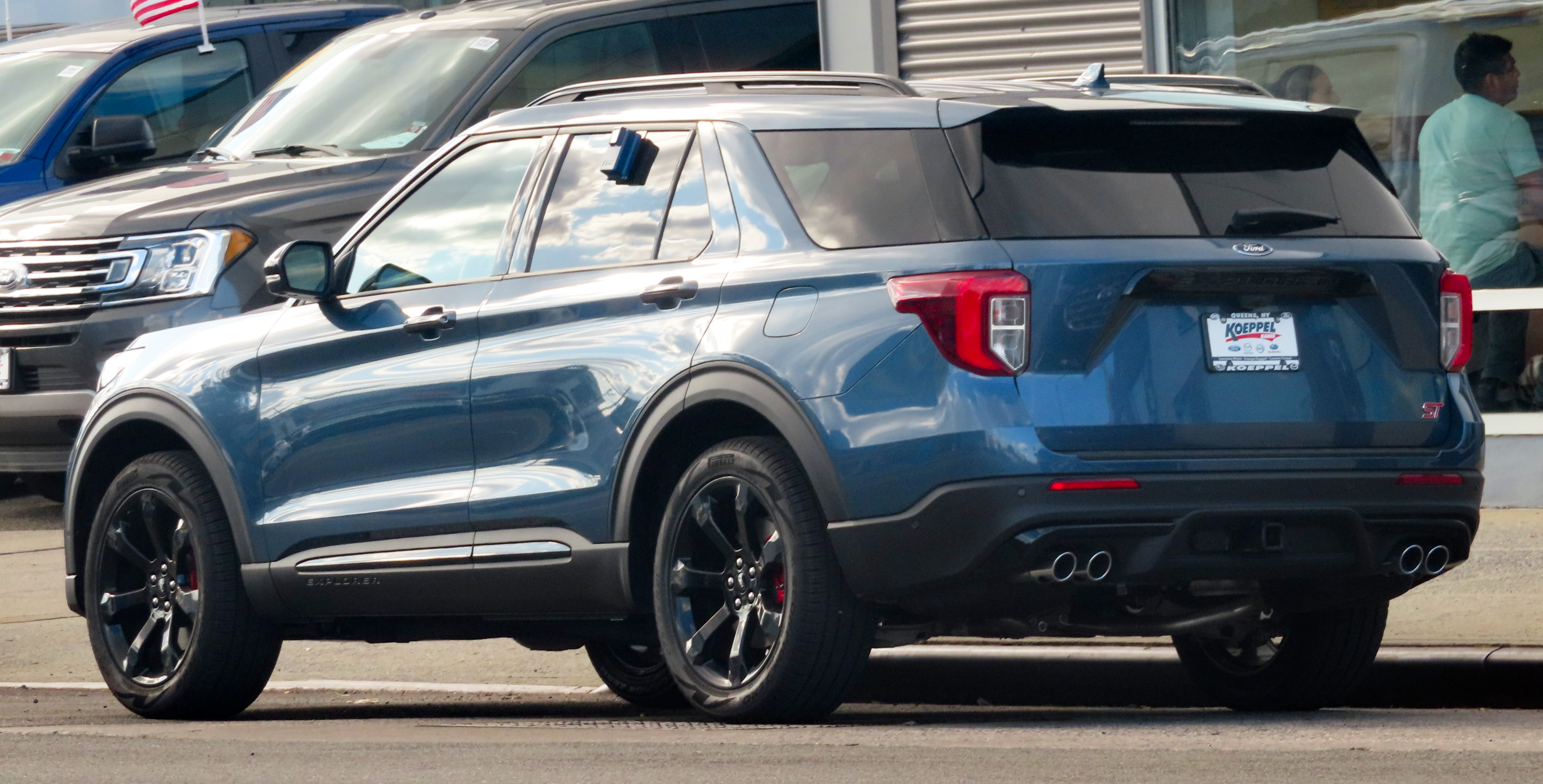
Explorer ST (rear; pre-facelift)

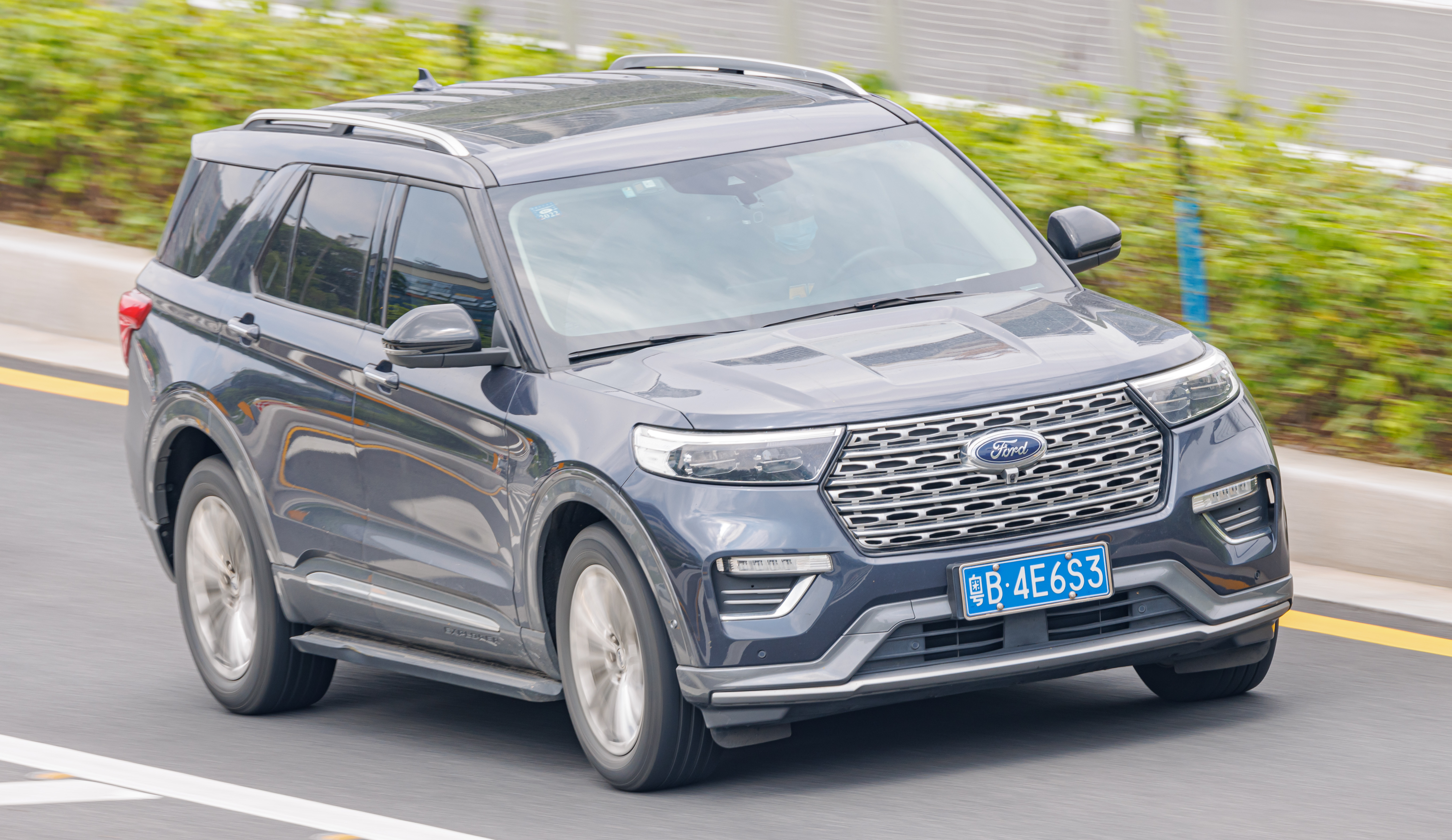
2020 Explorer (pre-facelift; China)

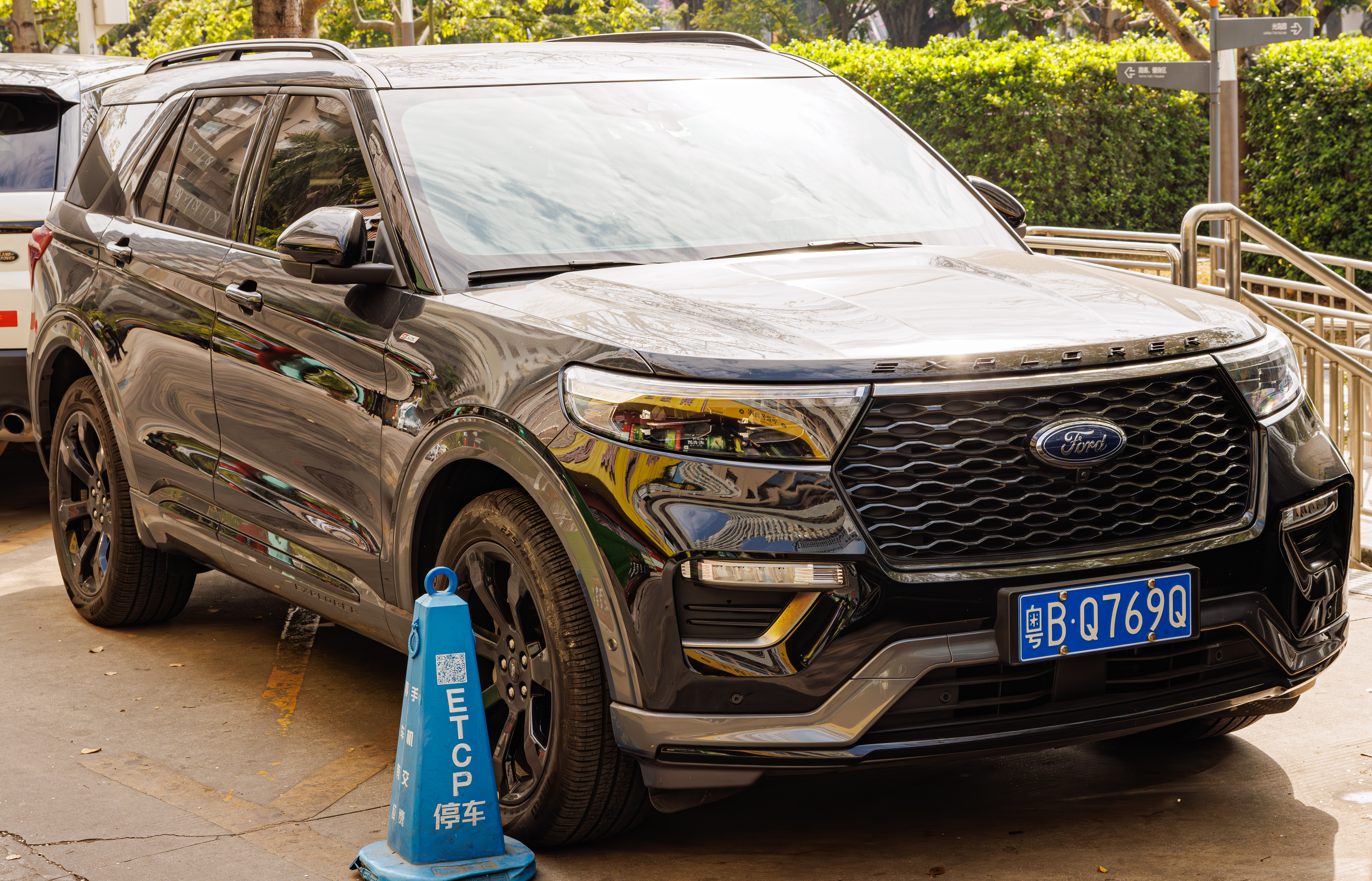
2020 Explorer ST-Line (pre-facelift; China)

=== 2022 model year ===
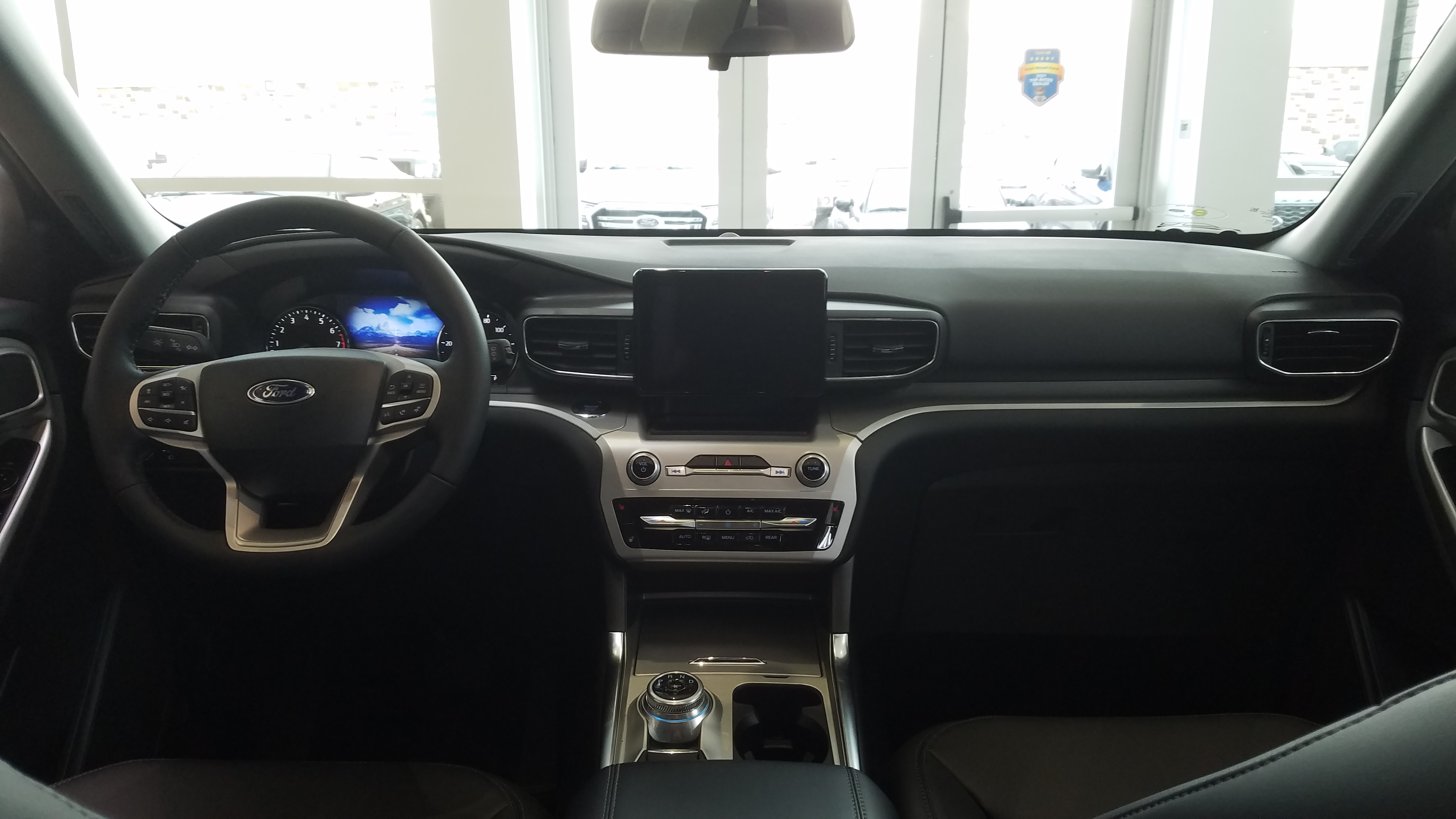
2022 Ford Explorer interior

For the 2022 model year, a rear-wheel drive version of the Explorer ST became available, as did a hybrid version of the range-topping Platinum. The XLT gained a new Appearance Package with unique aluminum-alloy wheels and seating surfaces. Added mid-year 2021, the Timberline trim is based on the mid-level XLT, and adds unique heathered cloth and ActiveX (leatherette)-trimmed seating surfaces, all-terrain tires, and unique exterior and interior styling details. A new ST Line trim, also based on the mid-level XLT, adds exterior and interior styling elements from the performance-oriented ST, but does not include the 3.0-liter EcoBoost twin-turbocharged V6 engine, and is instead powered by the base 2.3-liter EcoBoost inline four-cylinder engine. The ST Line offers an optional Bang and Olufsen premium surround sound audio system with an external amplifier, which was previously only offered on Limited trims and above.

=== 2025 refresh ===
The facelifted 6th generation Ford Explorer was revealed on February 1, 2024, for the 2025 model year, It features a redesigned front fascia with a larger grille, revised, sleeker headlights and taillights, and a revised interior with the addition of a 13.2-inch touchscreen and 12.3-inch digital gauge cluster, standard on all models. The previous eight trim levels was reduced to four, namely the Active (replacing the pre-facelift's XLT), ST-Line, ST, and Platinum. For 2026, this was increased to six; the Tremor (replacing the pre-facelift's Timberline) and the lower-end Active 100A (replacing the pre-facelift's unnamed Base) which slots below the standard Active, were introduced.

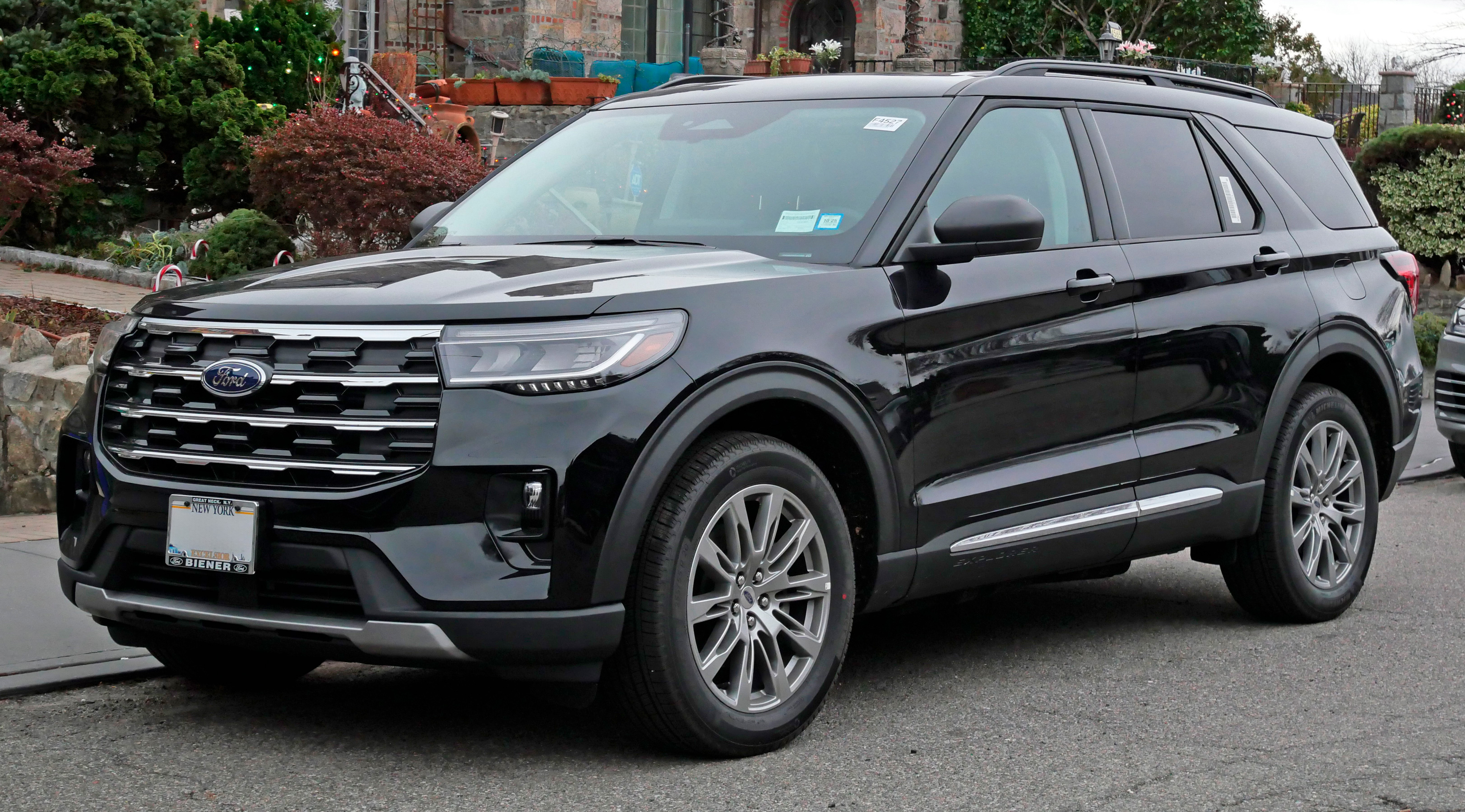
2025 Explorer Active (facelift)

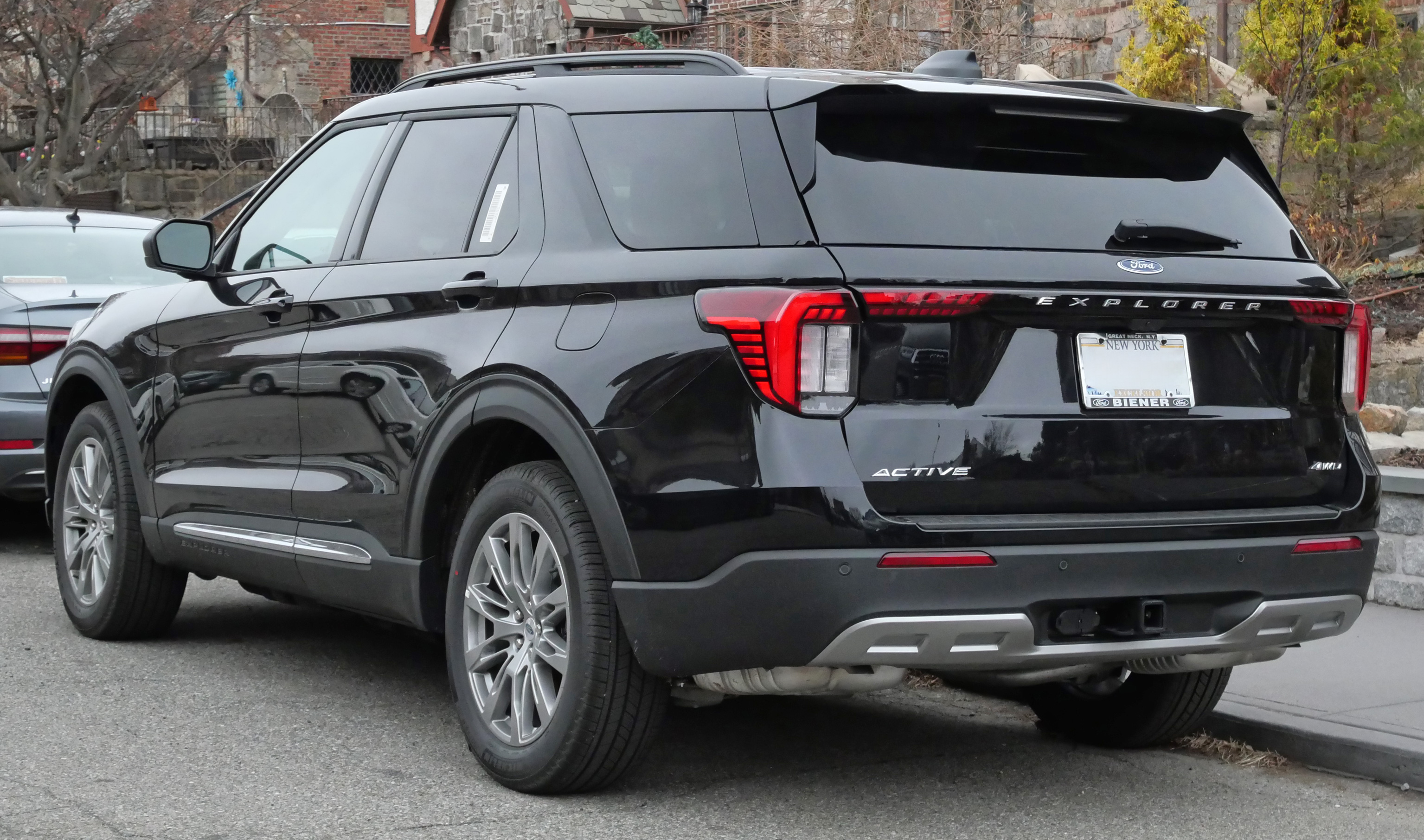
Rear view (facelift)

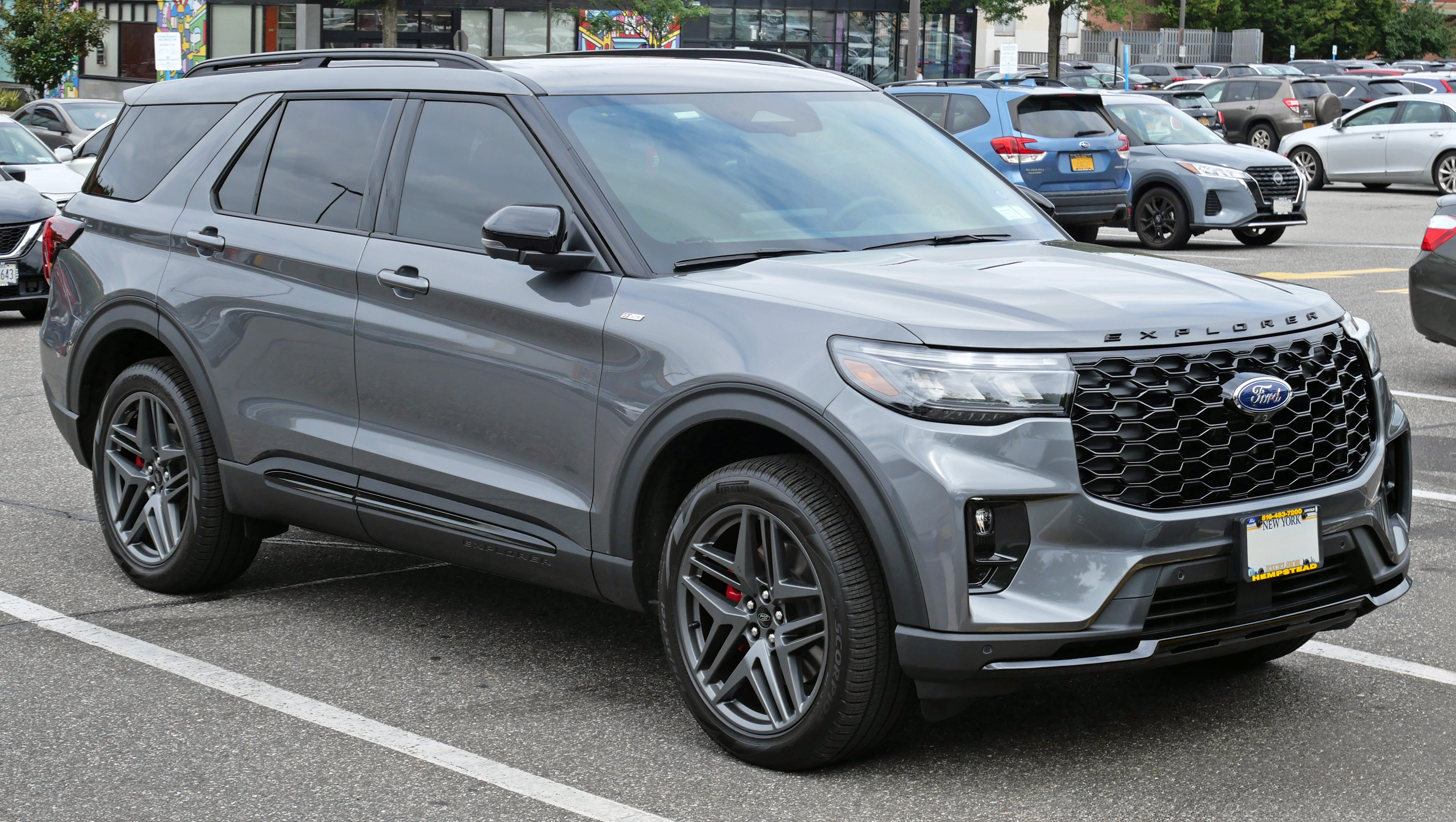
2025 Explorer ST-Line (facelift)

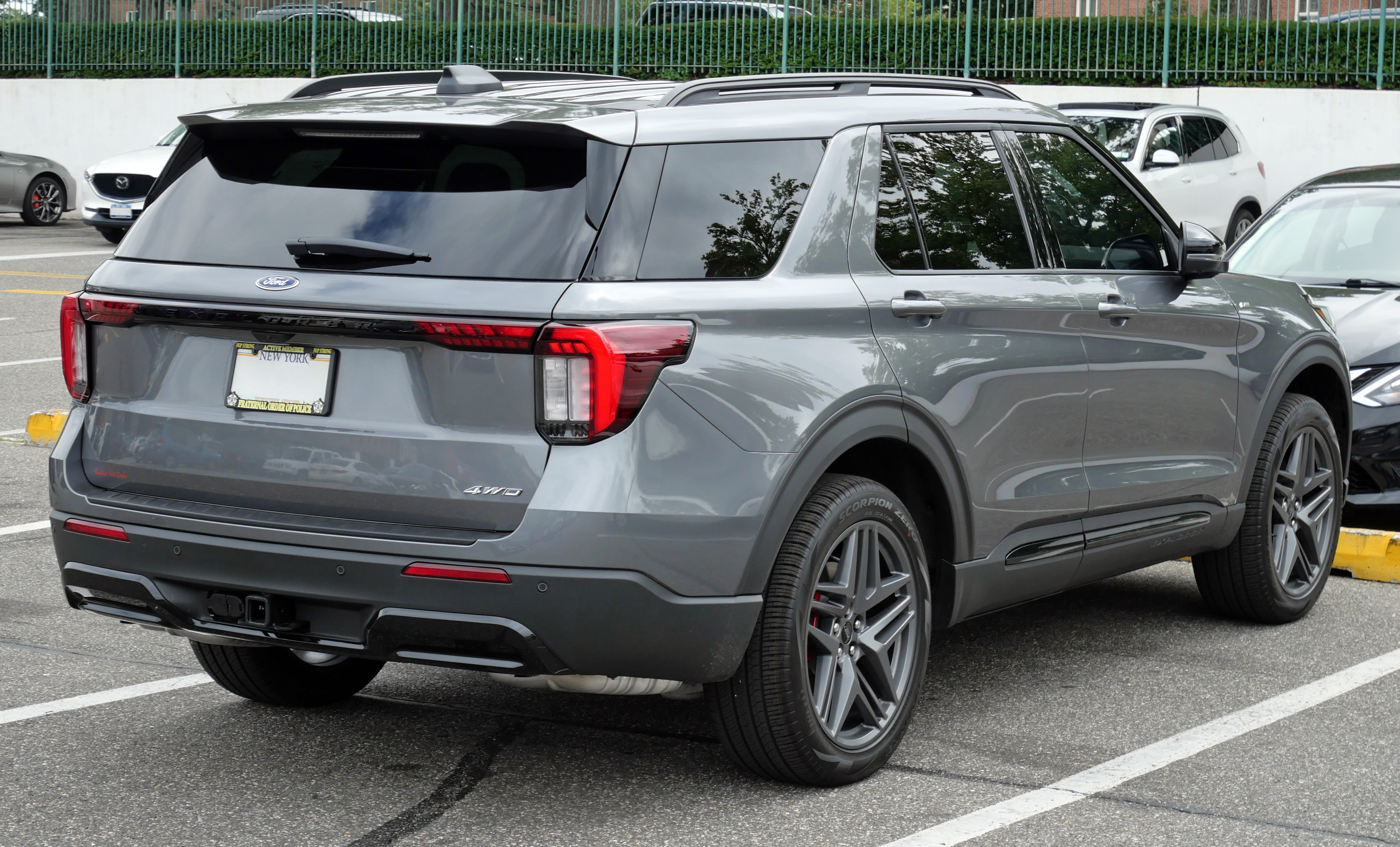
Rear view (facelift)

=== Engines ===
Type	Model Years	Power	Torque
2,261 cc (138.0 cu in) EcoBoost 2.3L I4	2020–present	300 hp (224 kW; 304 PS)	310 lb⋅ft (420 N⋅m)
3,340 cc (203.8 cu in) 3.3L V6 Hybrid	2020–2024 (Retail); 2020-present, Police Interceptor Utility	318 hp (237 kW; 322 PS)	332 lb⋅ft (450 N⋅m)
3,340 cc (203.8 cu in) 3.3L FFV V6	2020–present, Police Interceptor Utility	285 hp (213 kW; 289 PS)	260 lb⋅ft (353 N⋅m)
2,956 cc (180.4 cu in) EcoBoost 3.0 TT V6	2020–present, ST, Police Interceptor Utility; Platinum (2022–2025; 2027–present)	400 hp (298 kW; 406 PS)	415 lb⋅ft (563 N⋅m)
2,956 cc (180.4 cu in) EcoBoost 3.0 TT V6	2020–2021, Platinum	365 hp (272 kW; 370 PS)	380 lb⋅ft (515 N⋅m)

=== China ===
The Chinese market Ford Explorer received a facelift for the 2023 model year and was unveiled in August 2022, with orders received from August 11, and production kicking off on November 7. The facelift is exclusive to the Chinese market with revised front and rear end designs, the dashboard now accommodates a 27-inch infotainment touchscreen, and the center console has been reconfigured to fit twin wireless charging pads.

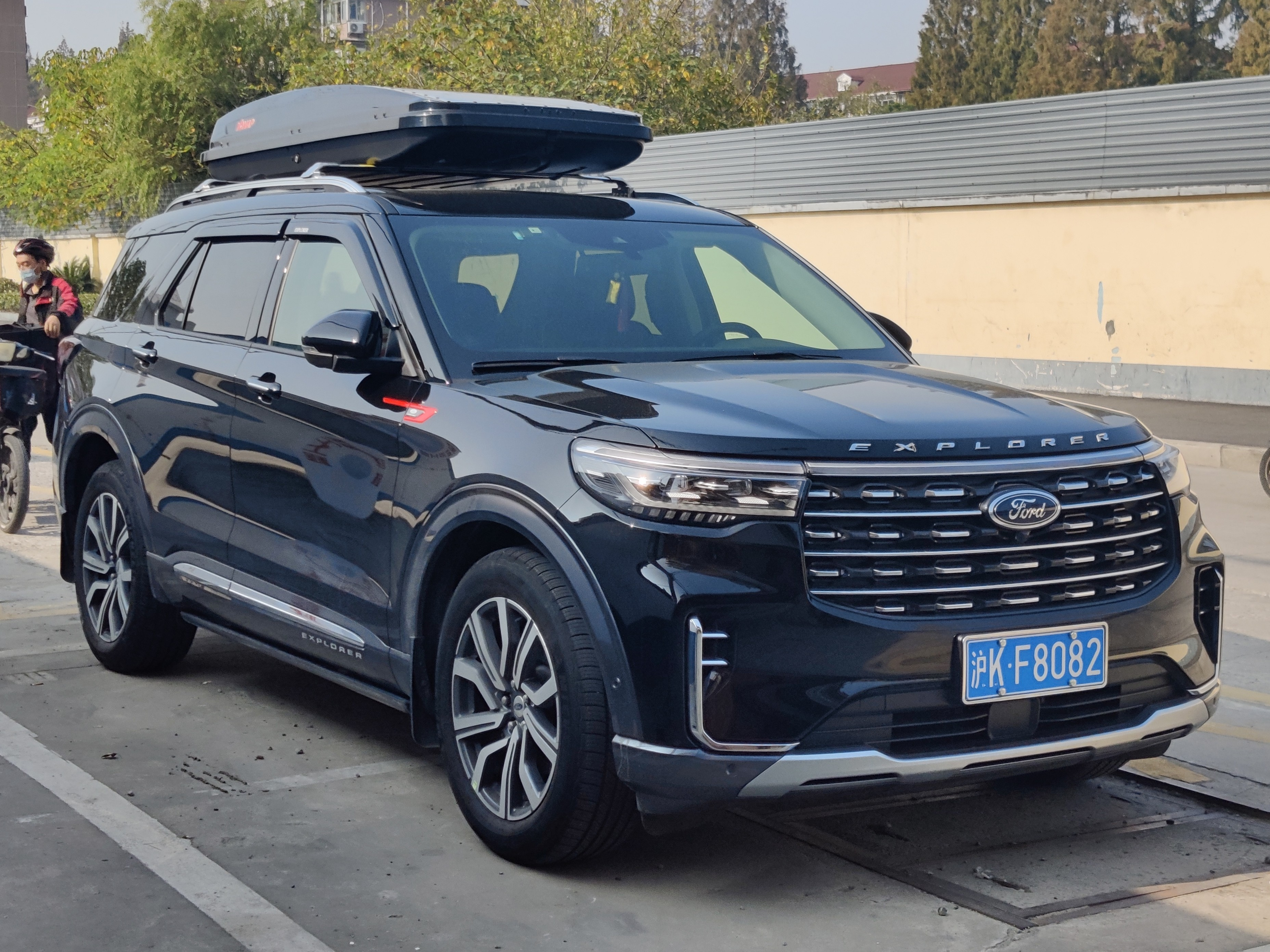
2023 Explorer (China)

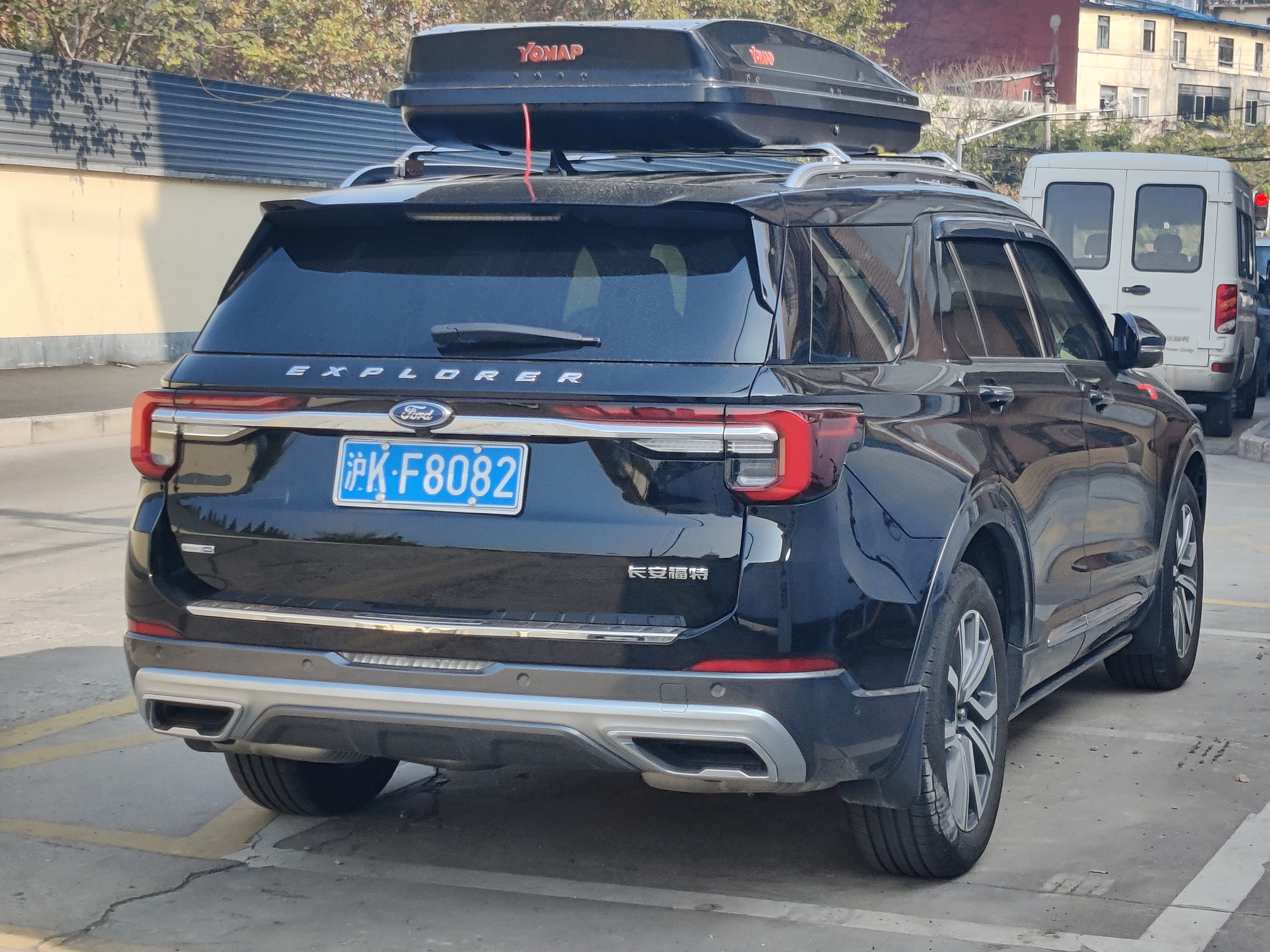
Rear view

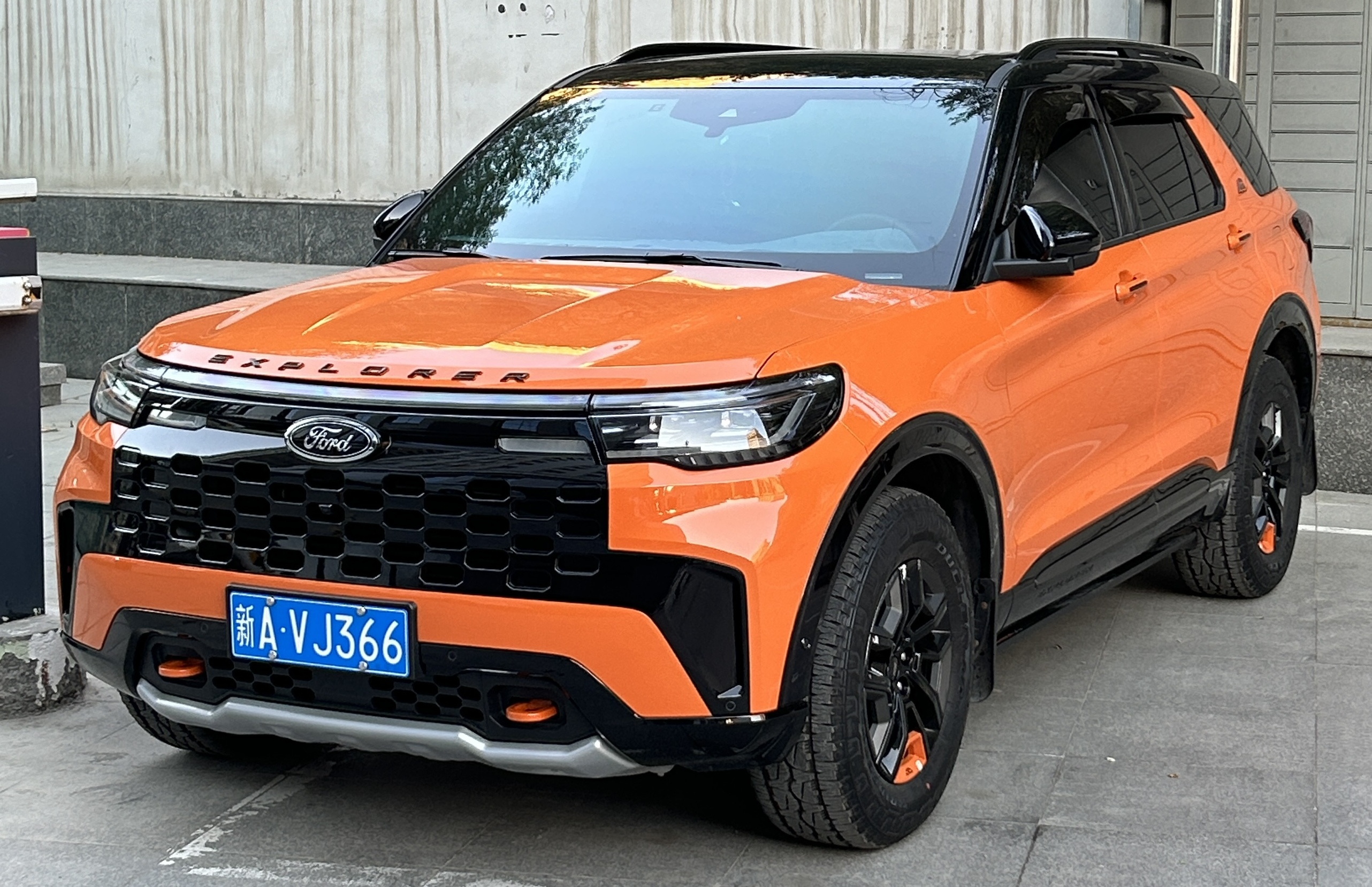
2023 Explorer Timberline (China)

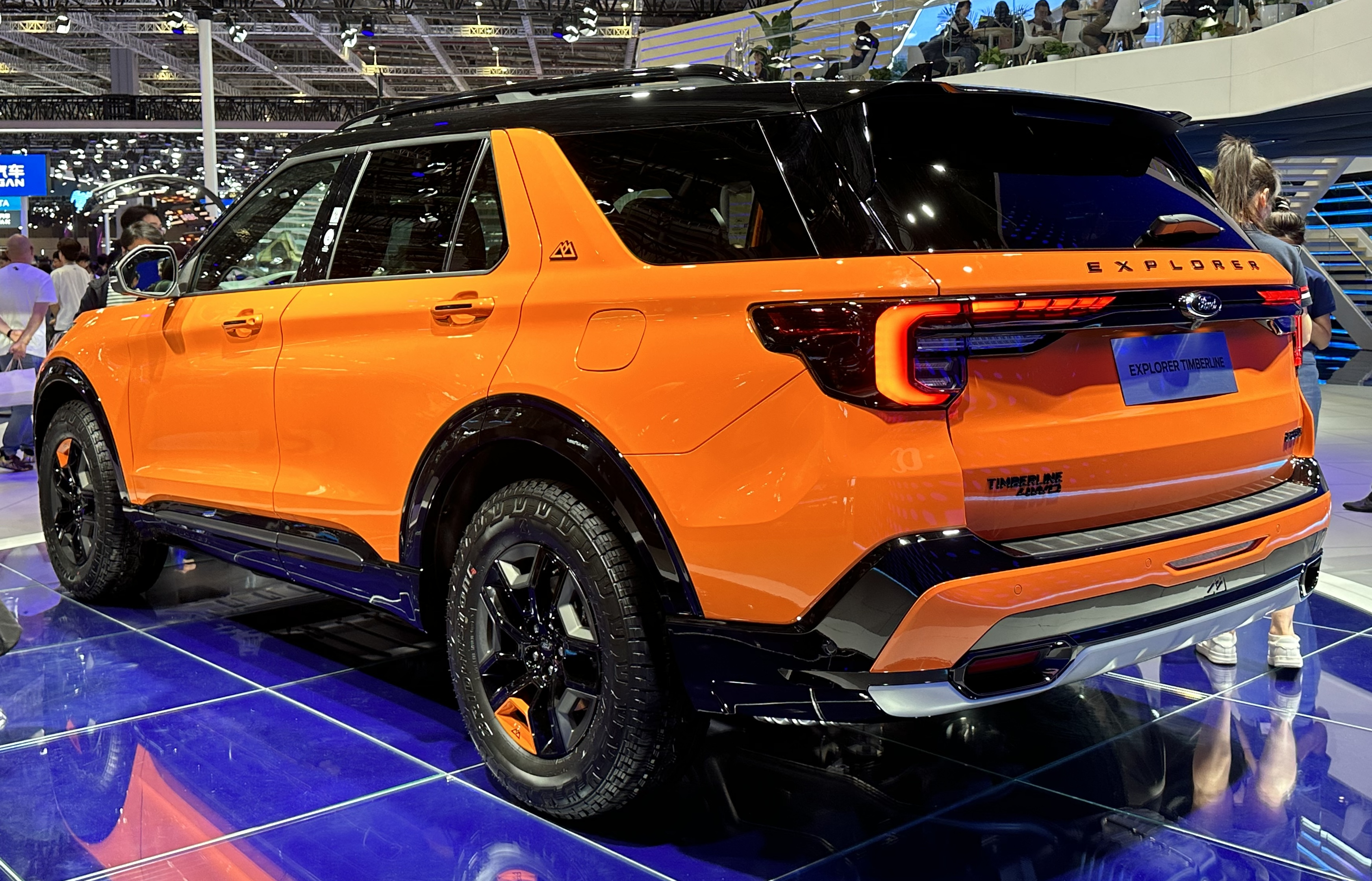
Rear view

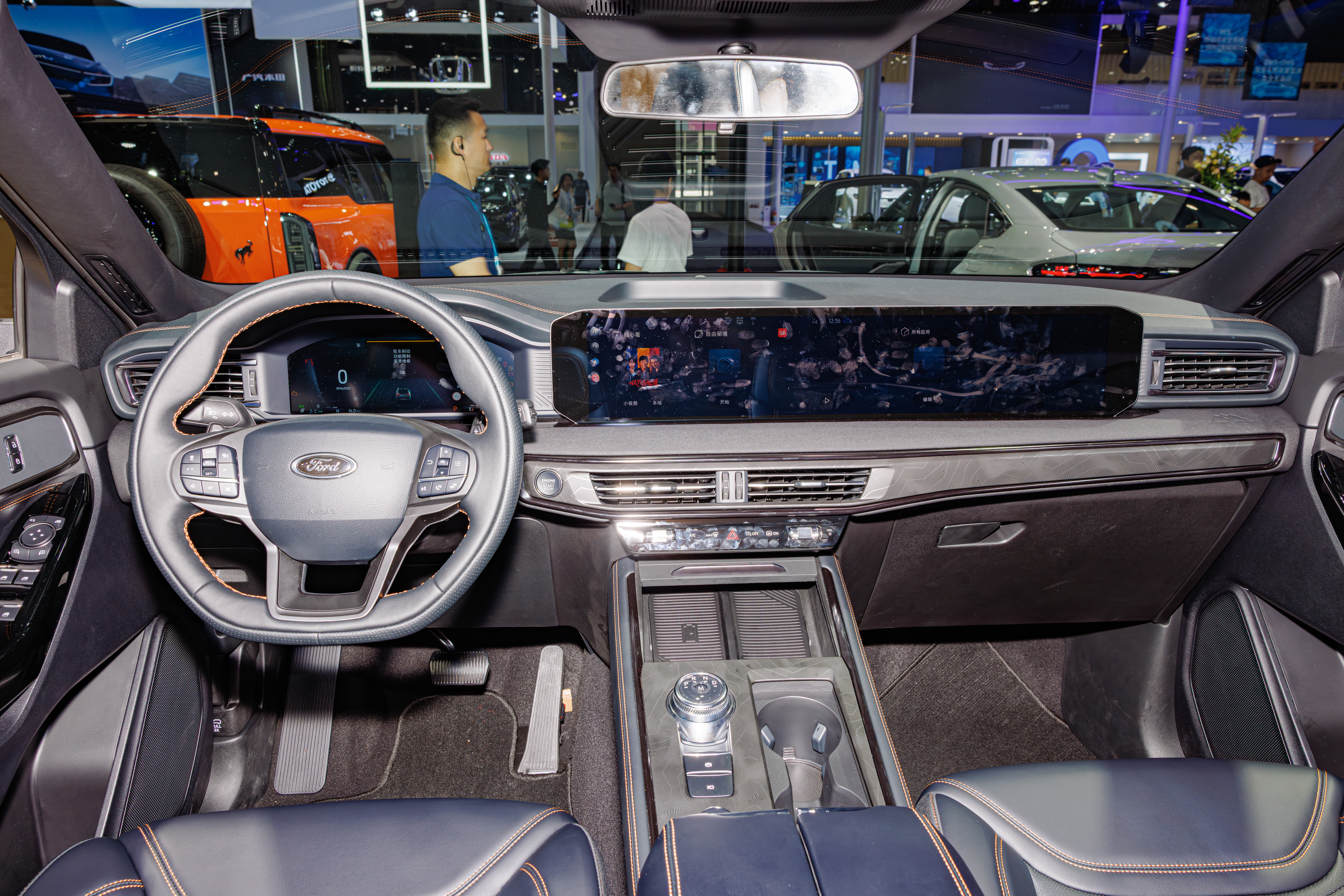
Interior

==== 2027 facelift ====
The Explorer underwent another facelift in China during 2026 for the 2027 model year. The headlight module, front grille, and lower bumper have been restyled, along with the taillights. The powertrain remains unchanged, with the sole option of a 2.3-liter turbocharged inline-4 mated to a 10-speed automatic.

2027 Explorer Limited facelift front

2027 Explorer Limited facelift rear

2027 Explorer Limited facelift interior

2027 Explorer Timberline facelift front

2027 Explorer Timberline facelift rear

=== Safety ===
==== IIHS ====
The 2020 Explorer was awarded the "Top Safety Pick +" by the Insurance Institute for Highway Safety.

IIHS scores
Small overlap front (Driver)	Good	
Small overlap front (Passenger)	Good	
Moderate overlap front	Good	
Side (original test)	Good	
Side (updated test)	Good	
Roof strength	Good	
Head restraints and seats	Good	
Headlights	Acceptable	
Front crash prevention (Vehicle-to-Vehicle)	Superior	optional
Front crash prevention (Vehicle-to-Vehicle)	Superior	standard
Front crash prevention (Vehicle-to-Pedestrian, day)	Advanced	optional
Front crash prevention (Vehicle-to-Pedestrian, day)	Superior	standard
Child seat anchors (LATCH) ease of use	Acceptable	

==== Euro NCAP ====
Euro NCAP test results* Ford Explorer Plug-in Hybrid (LHD) (2019)
Test	Points	%
Overall:	5 /5 stars	
Adult occupant:	33.2	87%
Child occupant:	42.2	86%
Pedestrian:	29.4	61%
Safety assist:	10	76%

== Variants and derivatives ==
=== 3-door / Explorer Sport ===
As the direct successor of the Bronco II, Ford developed a three-door version of the Explorer for the 1991 model year; while 10 inches shorter than its five-door counterpart, the three-door was still nearly 13 inches longer than the Bronco II. For the first generation, the three-door was available in XL, Sport, and Eddie Bauer trims, with Sport offered as a trim exclusive to the three-door, distinguished by black-colored wheel wells and rocker panels. For 1995, Expedition was offered as a trim package for the three-door Explorer; replacing the Eddie Bauer trim, the nameplate was retired after 1995 in preparation for the 1997 full-size four-door SUV.

During the second generation, the XL trim was retired for the 1999 model year, with all three-door Explorers becoming Explorer Sports. For 2001, the Explorer Sport was split from the five-door Explorer, retaining the second-generation body and chassis and adopting the front fascia and interior of the Explorer Sport Trac.

Ford discontinued the Explorer Sport following the 2003 model year with no direct replacement due to the declining popularity of three-door SUVs, with the final vehicle produced in July 2003.

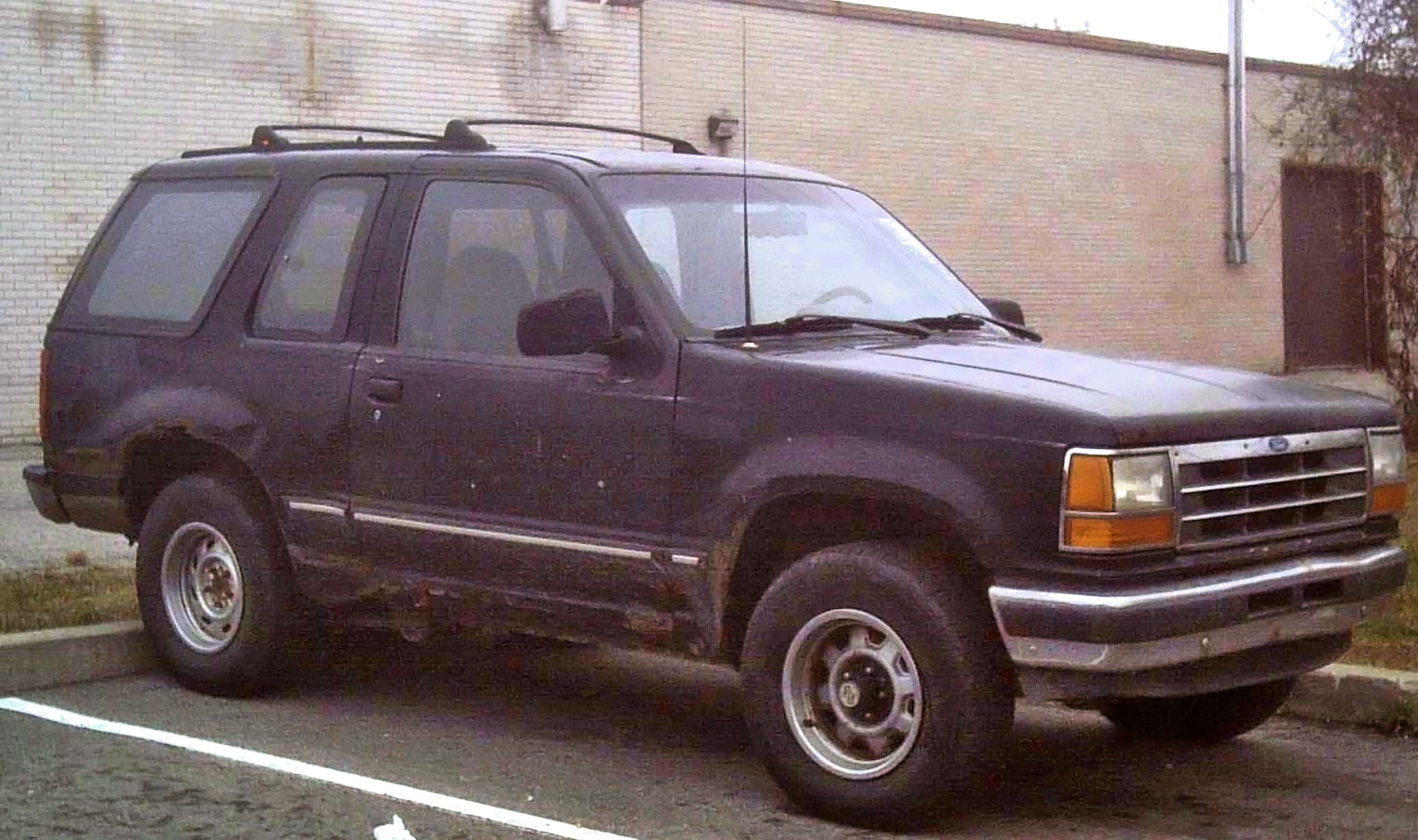
1991-1994 Ford Explorer XL

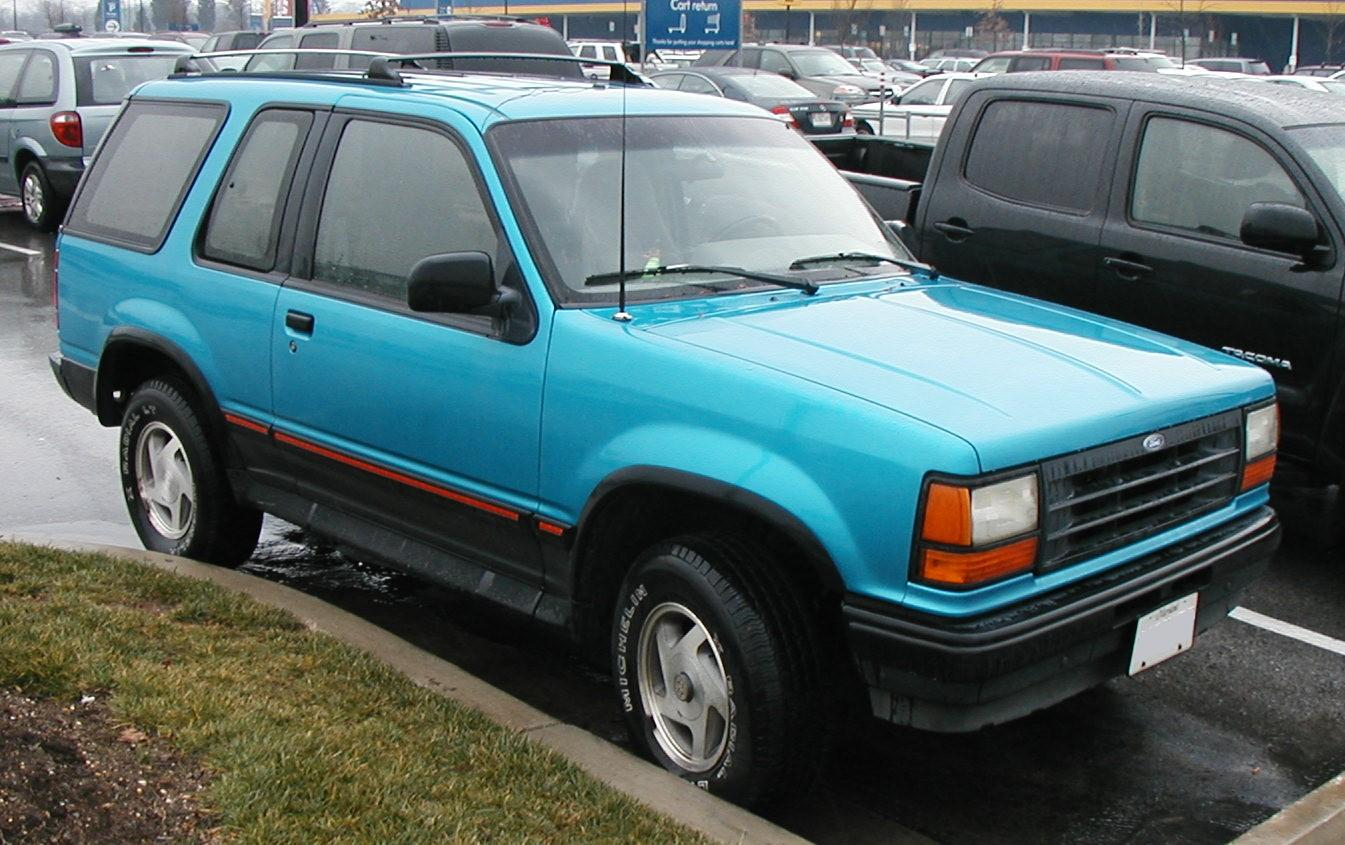
1991-1994 Ford Explorer Sport

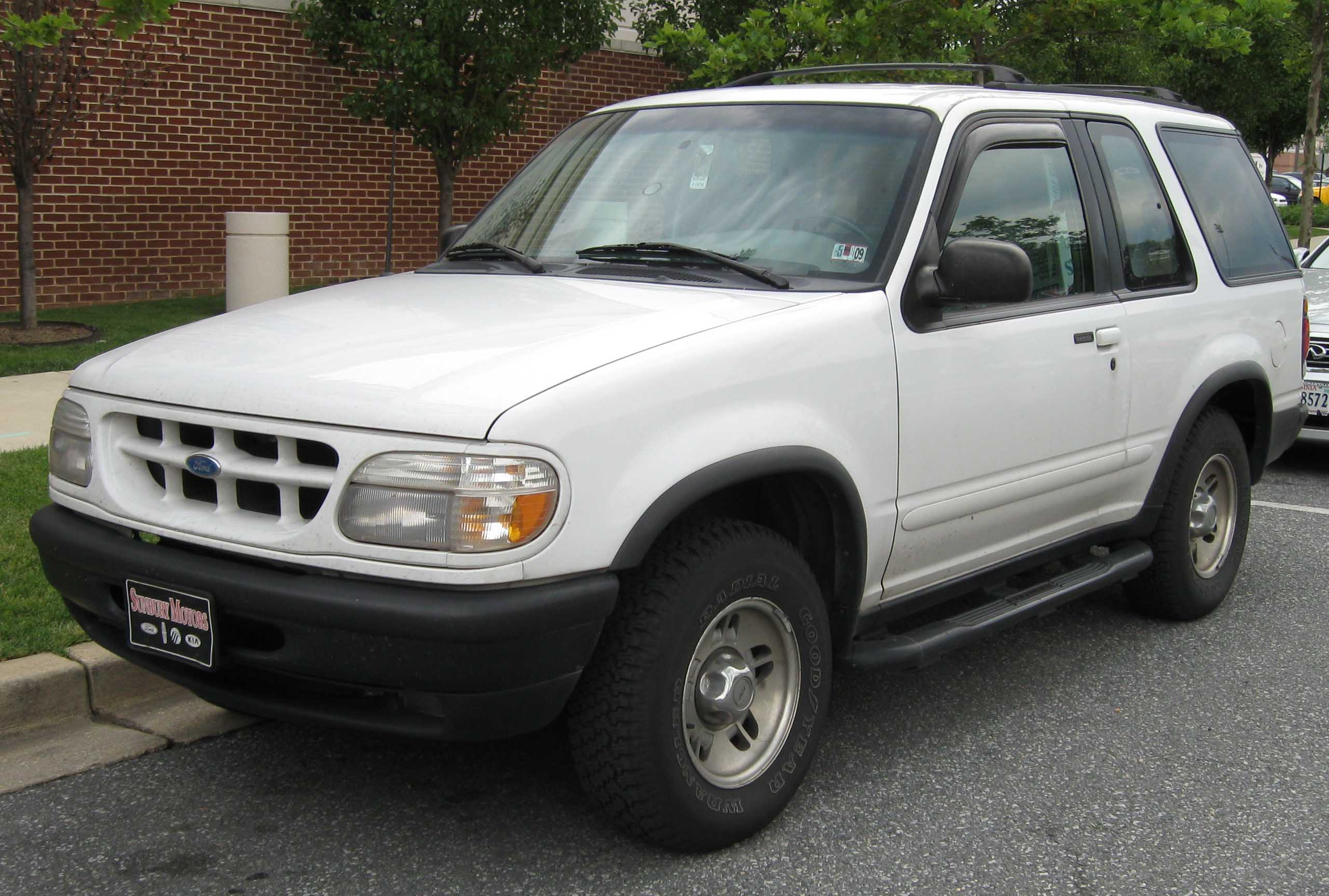
1995-2000 Ford Explorer Sport

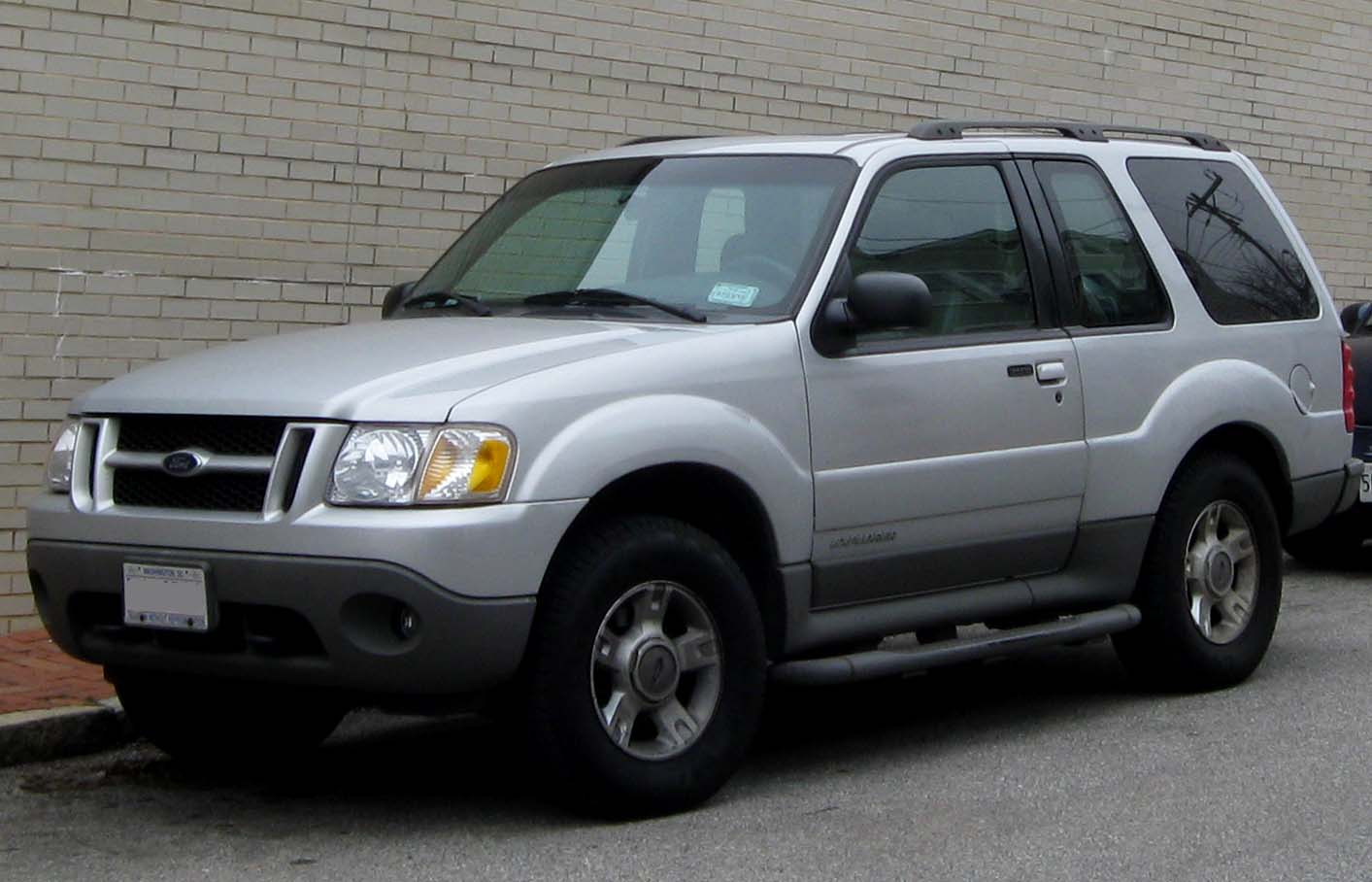
2001-2003 Ford Explorer Sport

=== Explorer Sport Trac ===
Introduced in 2000 as a 2001 model, the Explorer Sport Trac is a mid-size pickup truck derived from the second-generation Explorer, becoming the first mid-size Ford pickup. In contrast to the Ranger, the Sport Trac was marketed primarily as a personal-use vehicle rather than for work use.

Offered solely as a four-door crew cab, the design of the Sport Trac shared commonality with multiple vehicles. Sharing the frame and wheelbase of the Ranger SuperCab, the Sport Trac combined the front fascia of the Explorer Sport with a crew cab derived from the four-door Explorer; the pickup bed (designed for the model line) shared its tailgate with the F-150 SuperCrew.

The 2001–2005 Sport Trac was the final version of the Explorer derived from the Ranger. After skipping the 2006 model year, a second-generation Sport Trac was produced from 2007 until 2010 (derived from the fourth-generation Explorer).

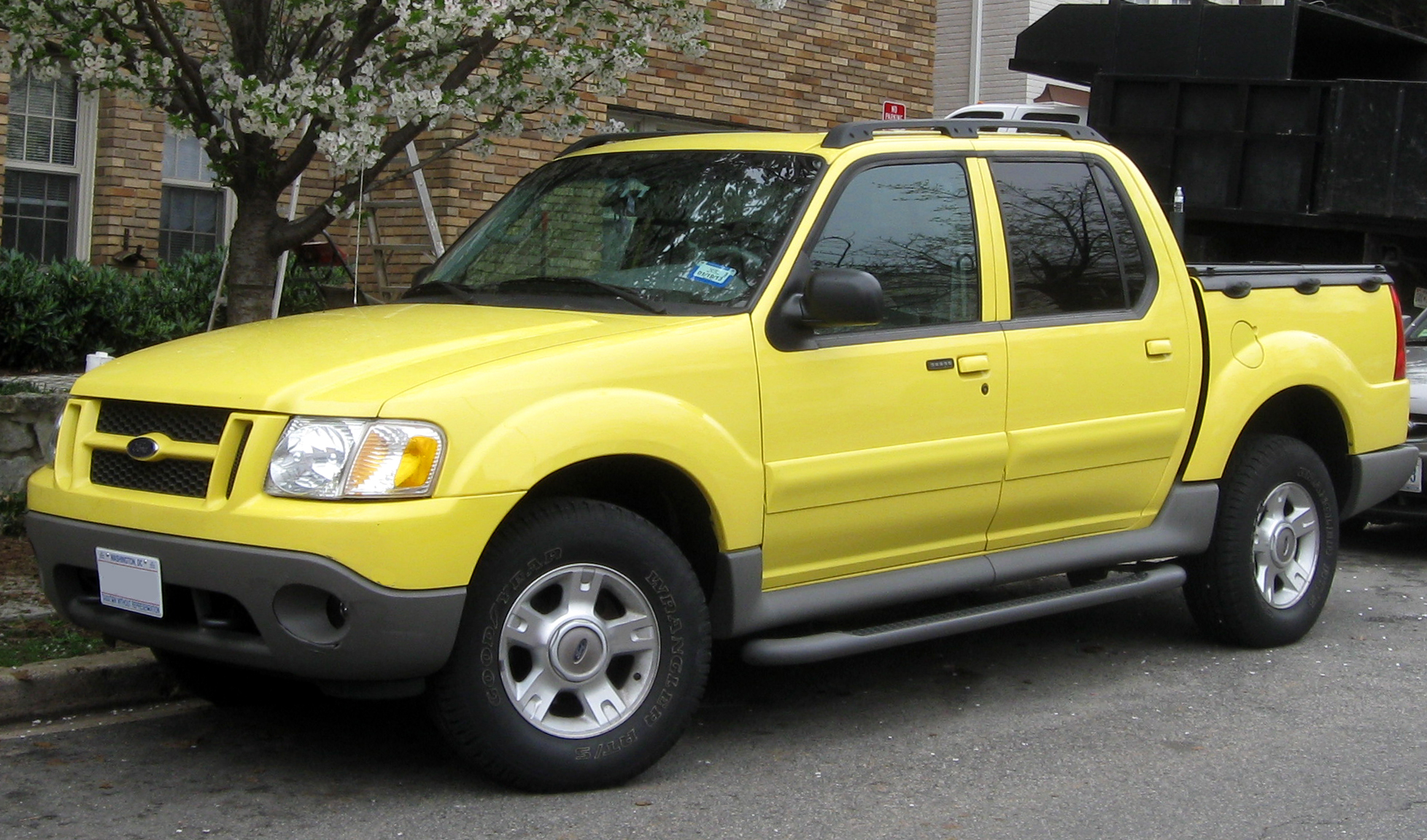
2003-2005 Ford Explorer Sport Trac

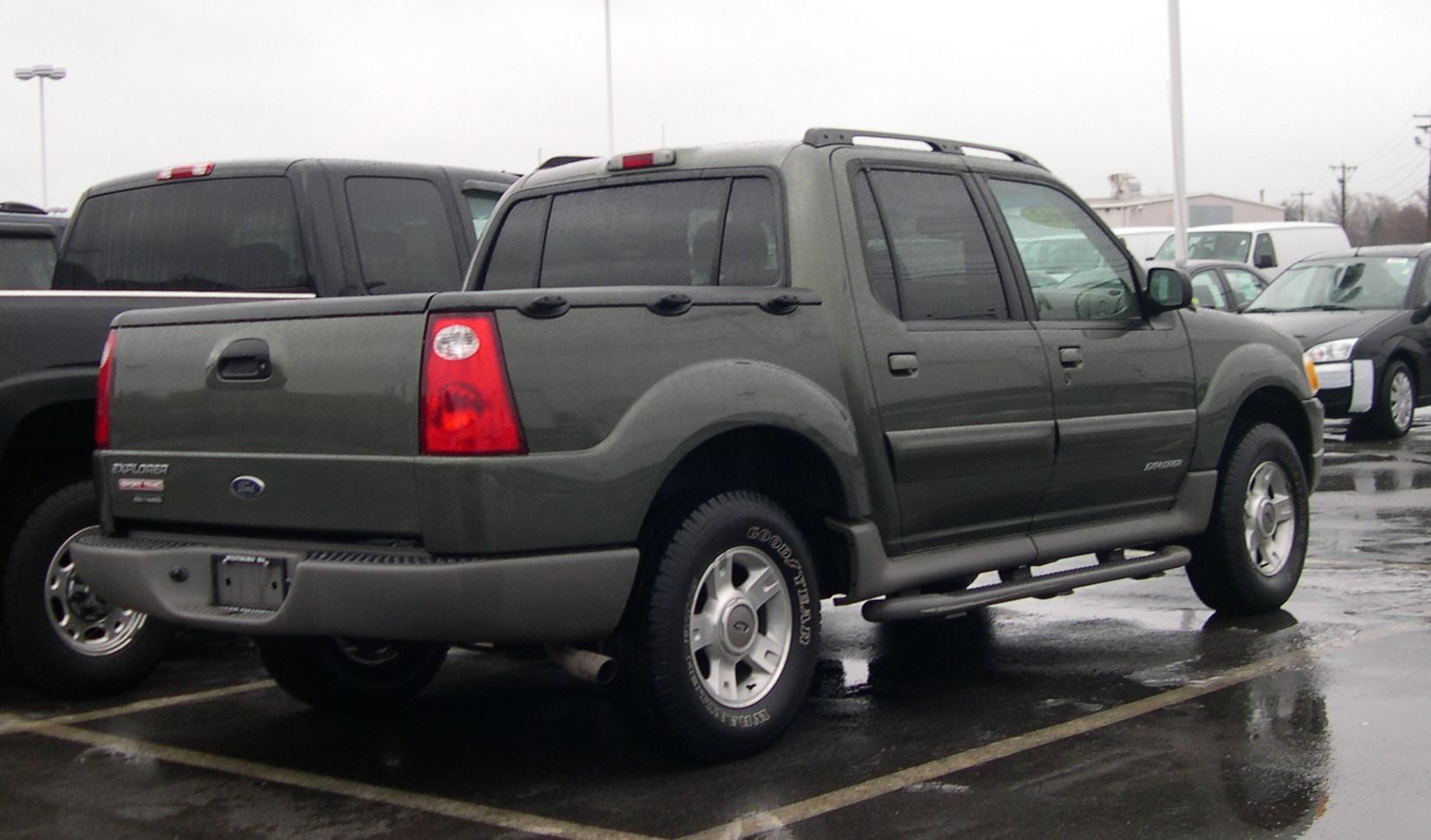
2001-2002 Ford Explorer Sport Trac, rear

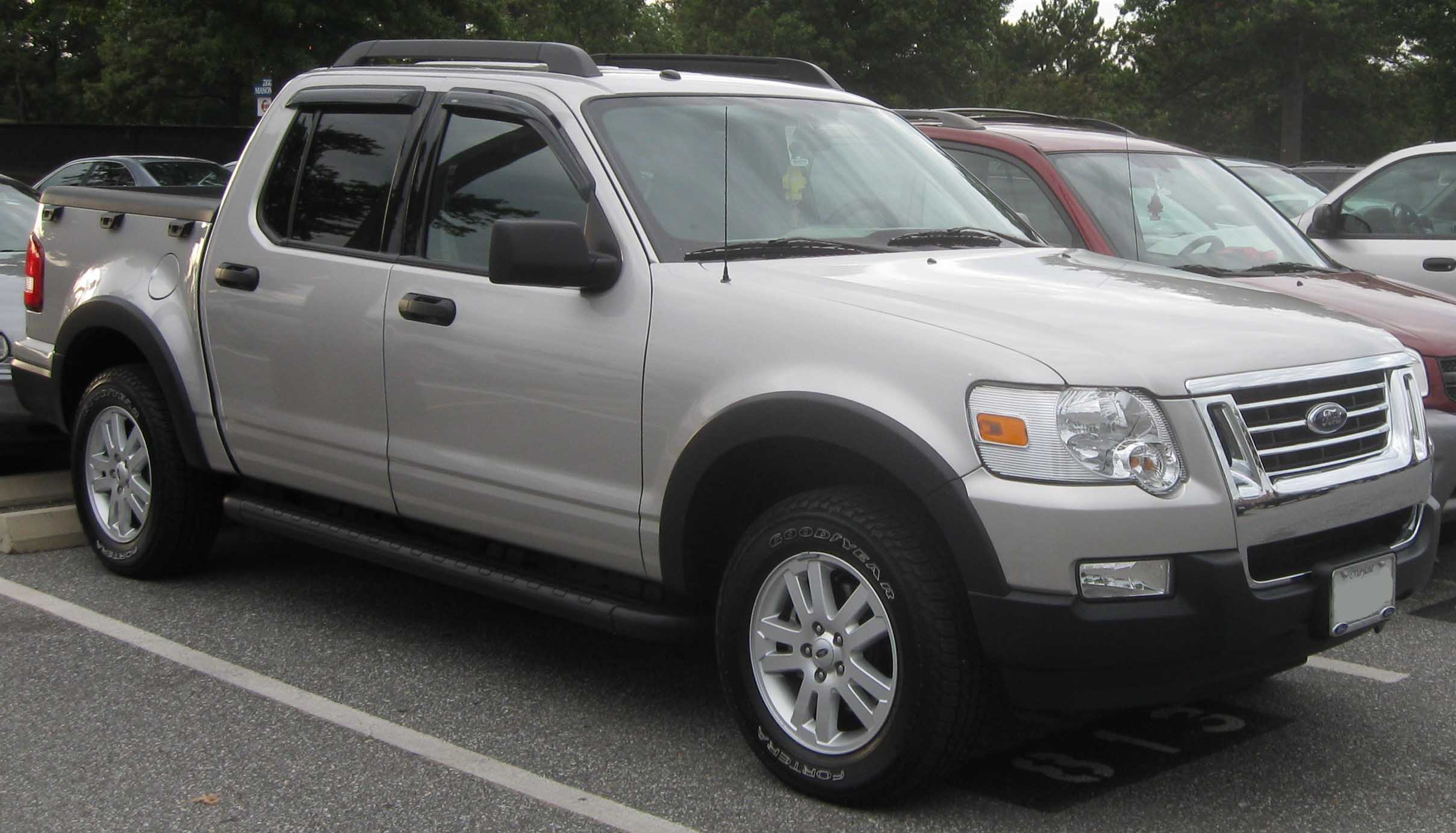
2007-2010 Ford Explorer Sport Trac

=== Police Interceptor Utility ===
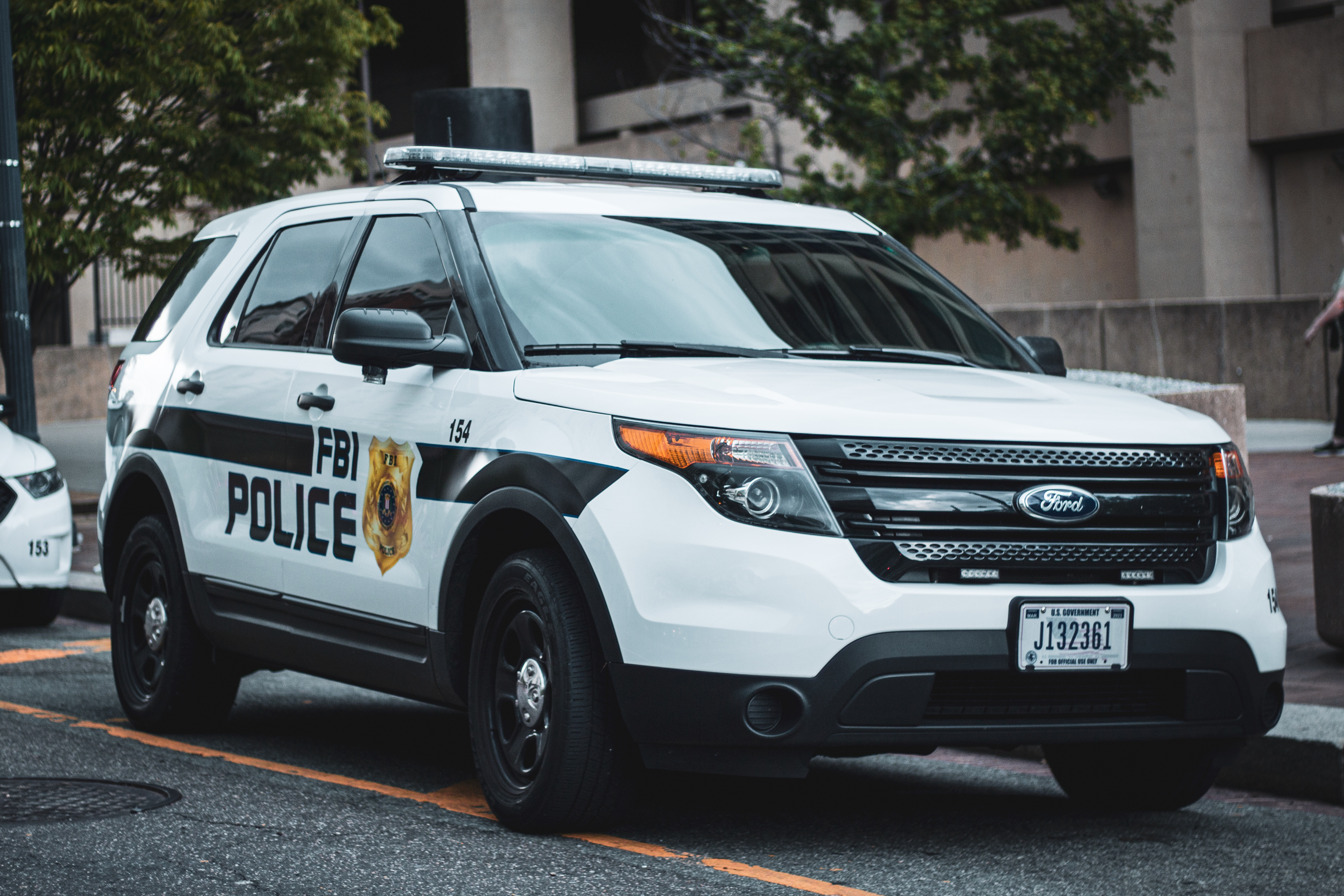
Pre-facelift with the FBI.

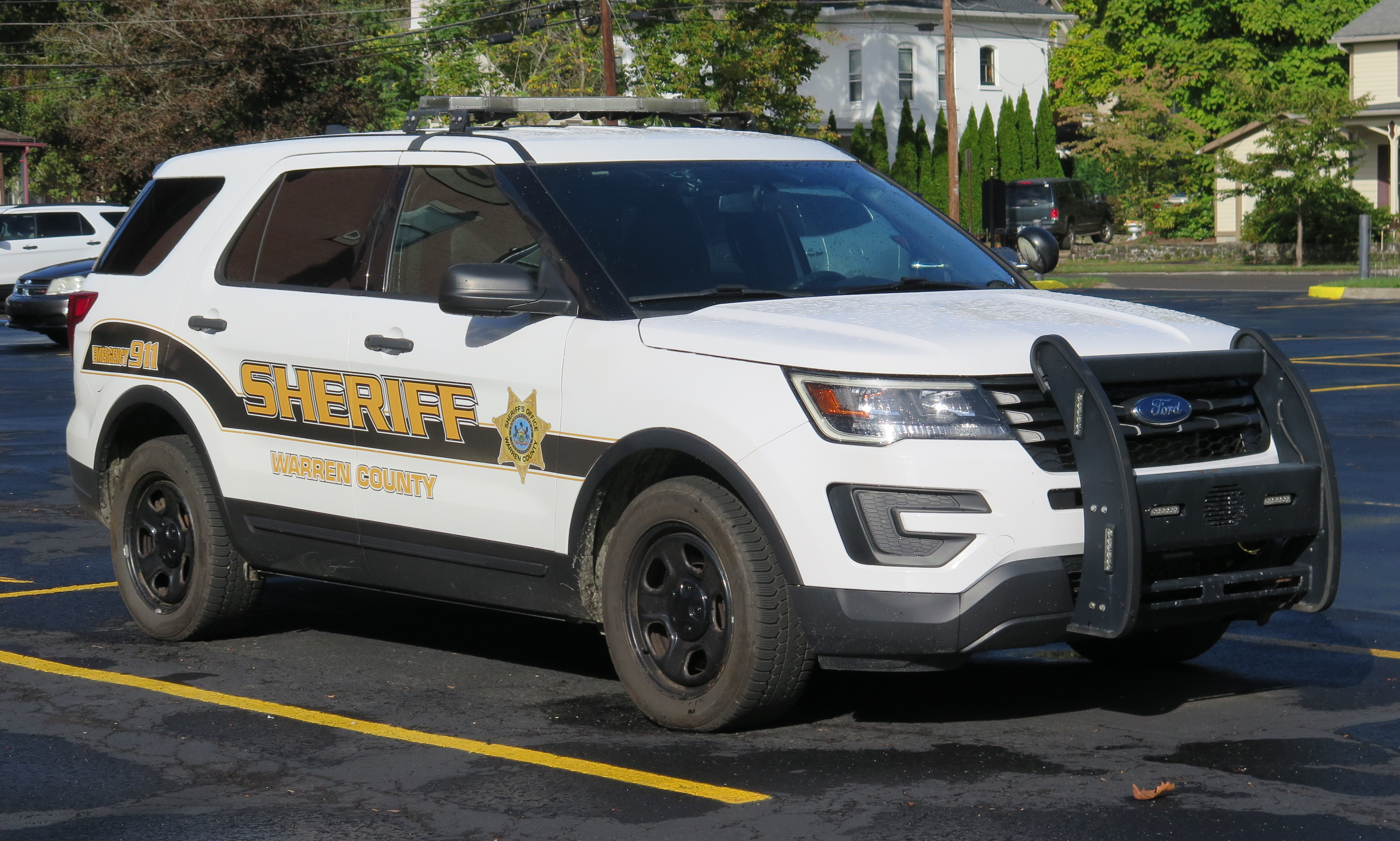
Post-facelift with the Warren County Sheriff's Office in Pennsylvania.

Following the end of production of the Ford Crown Victoria Police Interceptor (CVPI) in 2011, Ford developed two new models to replace it, as part of their Ford Police Interceptor range. For the 2013 model year, Ford introduced the Taurus-based Ford Police Interceptor Sedan (FPIS) and Explorer-based Ford Police Interceptor Utility (FPIU). Both models were designed & assembled alongside each other and were platform mates. As such, many mechanical parts, repair techniques, specifications, and vehicle interfaces were intentionally the same between the two vehicles to facilitate easier repairs and user familiarity. Like the CVPI, the Ford Expedition SSV, and the Taurus-based FPIS, the FPIU was not made available for retail sale.

Unlike the outgoing CVPI and the Expedition SSV, the FPIU was unavailable with a V8 engine. Instead, it was equipped with a 3.7 L Cyclone V6 used in the Ford Mustang, but in a transverse arrangement as the standard engine. It made 304 hp (227 kW; 308 PS) and 279 lb⋅ft (378 N⋅m) of torque, and was flex fuel capable. Permanent torque-vectoring all-wheel drive was standard across the line. For the 2014 model year, a 3.5 L twin-turbocharged EcoBoost V6, shared with the Explorer Sport, Taurus SHO, and FPIS was added to the lineup making 365 hp (272 kW; 370 PS) and 350 lb⋅ft (470 N⋅m) of torque. All iterations of the FPIU used a variant of Ford's 6F six-speed automatic transmission.

Visually, the FPIU could be easily told apart from a standard Ford Explorer. It featured a black front grille with black exterior trim, black steel wheels with chrome center caps or plastic hubcaps, a keyhole on the trunk door, Police Interceptor badging on the trunk door, and no roof rails. The EcoBoost FPIU featured several distinct visual cues that set it apart from its non-turbocharged counterpart. The EcoBoost variant featured a different grille, similar to that of the FPIS, large INTERCEPTOR badging across the hood lip, and an EcoBoost badge on the trunk. The daytime running lamps on the Explorer were removed for FPIUs and the turn signals act in place of them.

Many standard features that were fitted to the FPIU were not available on the standard Ford Explorer, including 75 mph (121 km/h) rear impact protection; a police calibrated ECM for high performance driving & long idling times; a heavy duty cooling system that included a larger radiator, an engine oil cooler, transmission cooler, power transfer unit (PTU) cooler, and police-calibrated radiator fan settings; a 220-amp alternator; heavy duty 13-inch brake rotors with special ventilation & 18-inch five spoke steel wheels; true dual exhaust; a police-tuned suspension with heavy duty components; raised ride height; steel deflector plates along the underbody; reinforced frame points; reinforced front door hinges; factory provisions to add emergency equipment, and a specially tuned electronic stability control system tailored to emergency style driving. Interior-wise, the FPIU differentiated from the standard Ford Explorer, featuring a column shifter as opposed to a floor shifter, programmable steering wheel controls, a certified-calibration speedometer, an engine idle hour meter, heavy-duty cloth front seats with stab-proof front seat backs, a vinyl rear seat without headrests, vinyl flooring, and the ability to disable the rear door locks and window switches. A third-row seating option was not available on the FPIU. Some features found on a standard Ford Explorer were available as standalone options on the FPIU, such as Ford SYNC, a rear-view camera, reverse sensors, blind spot monitoring, keyless entry, a carpeted interior, a full center console, exterior fog lamps, automatic headlights, and a rear HVAC system.

The Ford Police Interceptor Utility proved to be popular, outselling the FPIS, and became ubiquitous with law enforcement as the CVPI was being phased out. The California Highway Patrol began to use the Police Interceptor Utility as a CVPI replacement because the FPIS, Chevrolet Caprice, and Dodge Charger patrol cars did not meet the payload the CHP requires for a universal patrol car. In May 2014, statistician R.L. Polk declared the FPIU the most popular police vehicle, based on 2013 U.S. sales figures.

For the 2016 model year, the FPIU was refreshed along with the rest of the Explorer line. Though powertrain options remained the same, the FPIU received an upgraded electrical system, a new front fascia with LED reflector headlights, a new rear fascia, and an unlock button on the trunk. Inside, the FPIU received a new steering wheel, new interior trim, and a revised center stack. The electronic stability control system was re-tuned to allow for J-turns. Moreover, the optional rear-view camera now featured a lens washer, which is operated from the wiper stalk. A perimeter alarm was introduced as an option that automatically locked the doors and closed the windows if anyone attempted to approach the vehicle from its blind spots. Coinciding with the minor refresh of the retail Explorer, for 2018, the rear bumper cover was slightly revised, and all 3.7L versions featured a Flex Fuel badge in place of the AWD badge on the trunk-lid. Notably, unlike the retail Explorer, the front bumper cover was not restyled and was carried over from the 2017 model.

==== Second generation ====
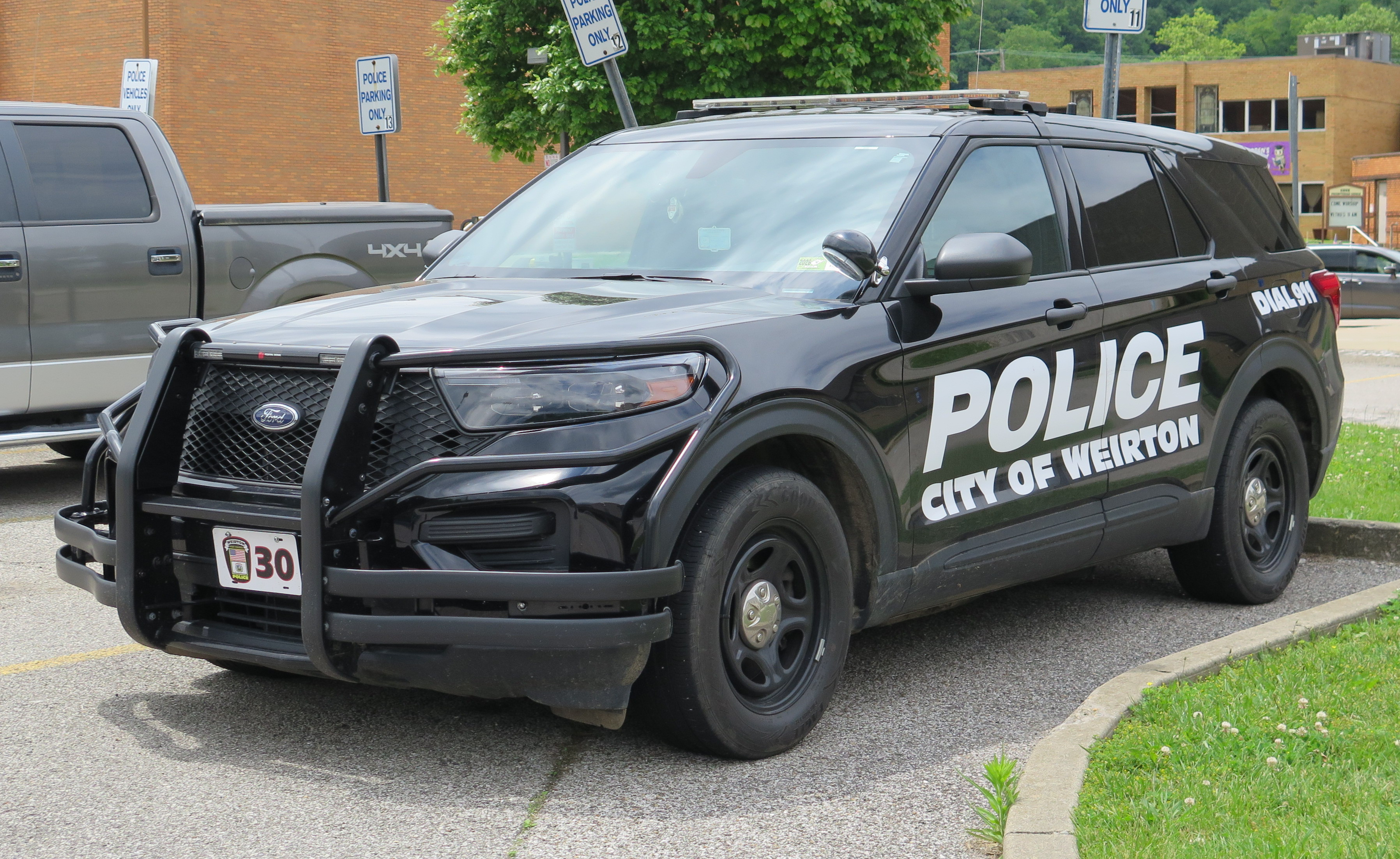
Second generation with the Weirton Police Department West Virginia.

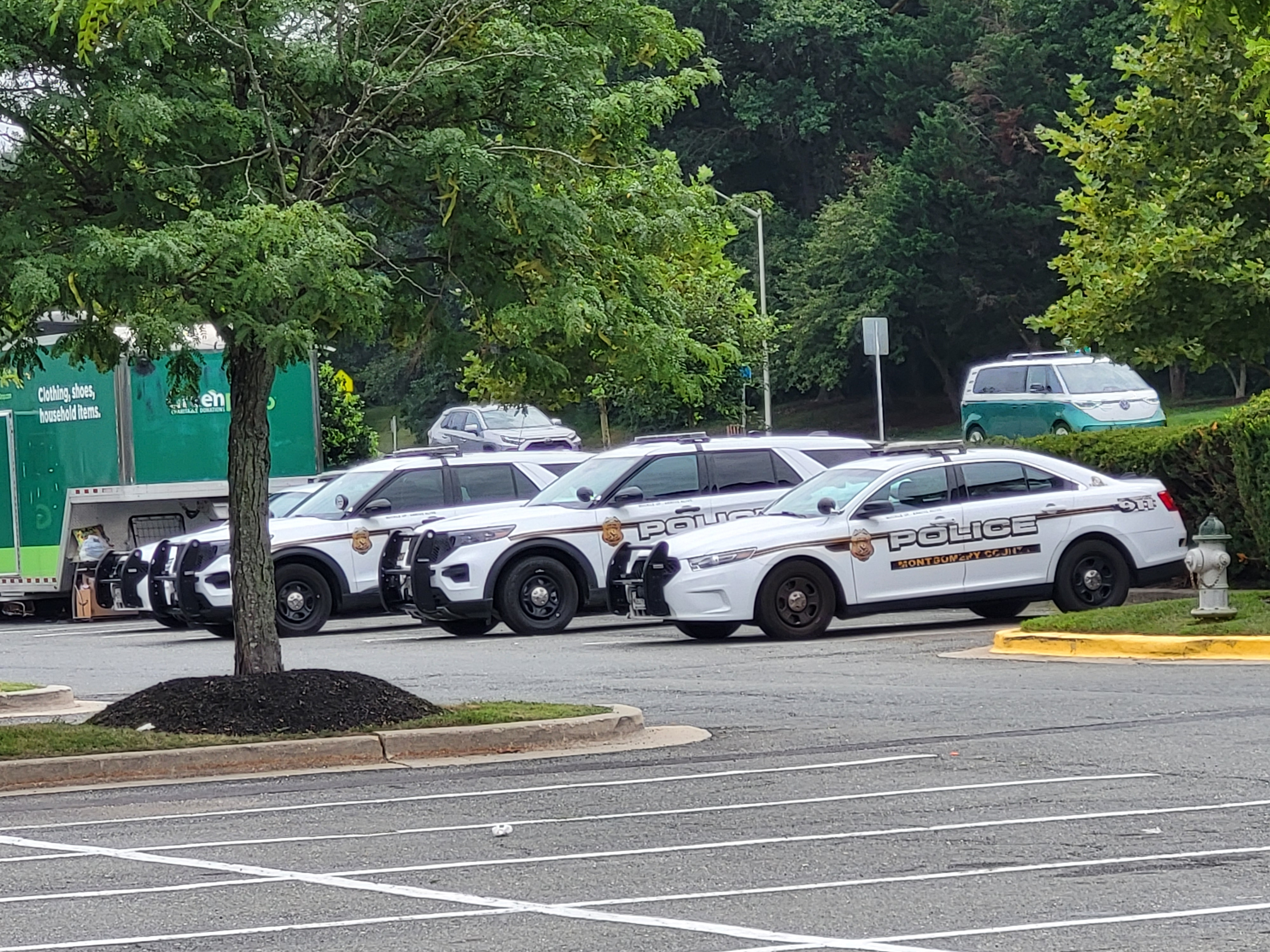
Second generation with the Montgomery County Police Department in Maryland.

For the 2020 model year, Ford released a second-generation Police Interceptor Utility, derived from the sixth-generation Explorer. Offered exclusively in a permanent all-wheel drive configuration, it now rides on Ford's all-new rear-wheel drive based CD6 platform. The second generation FPIU does not have a sedan counterpart; the Ford Police Interceptor Sedan was discontinued in 2019.

Many of the same Utility-specific standard features were carried over from the first-generation version. For the first time, the FPIU was offered in a hybrid drive-train configuration. Bluetooth is now standard as is a 250 amp alternator, Ford Telematics, and dual-zone front temperature control. A 12.1-inch center stack display is now optional, and the optional perimeter alarm has been advanced. The second generation FPIU gains cargo space (even with hybrid batteries on board) over its predecessor.

The second generation FPIU was offered with three all-new engine choices: a twin-turbocharged 3.0L EcoBoost V6 making 400 hp (300 kW; 410 PS) and 415 lb⋅ft (563 N⋅m) of torque, a 3.3L Hybrid V6 making 318 hp (237 kW; 322 PS) and 332 lb⋅ft (450 N⋅m) of torque, and a naturally aspirated 3.3 L V6 engine making 285 hp (213 kW; 289 PS) and 260 lb⋅ft (350 N⋅m) of torque, the latter of which is unavailable on the retail Ford Explorer. All iterations of the second-generation FPIU use a 10-speed automatic transmission. Notably, the 3.0 L EcoBoost V6 Utility was the quickest police vehicle available in Michigan State Police testing with a 0 to 60 mph (0 to 97 km/h) time of 5.5 seconds and a top speed of 148 mph (238 km/h).

The new hybrid system is based on Ford's fourth-generation modular hybrid system, which shares up to 90% of its parts with the Escape Hybrid and F-150 Hybrid. It is estimated that the hybrid drive-train will save departments between $3,500 and $5,700 a year per vehicle in fuel costs. In total, the hybrid system increased the combined fuel economy of the Utility from 19 mpg_{‑US} (12 L/100 km; 23 mpg_{‑imp}) to 24 mpg_{‑US} (9.8 L/100 km; 29 mpg_{‑imp}), a 26% increase.

==== 2025 update ====
For the 2025 model year, the FPIU received several updates; it coincided with the mid-cycle refresh of the civilian Explorer. Unlike its civilian counterpart, the front fascia retained the same styling as its 2024 predecessor. According to Ford, this was done to streamline up-fitting and reduce costs so that agencies can directly swap equipment from previous model years (such as emergency lights and push bumpers) to a new vehicle. The rear fascia, however, received new tail lamps and a re-designed hatch filler trim in between the tail lamps.

Unlike the civilian Explorer, the interior was largely carried over from the 2024 model year but with minor updates such as a fully digital gauge cluster, and a larger center stack display with enhanced graphics and advanced OTA (Over the Air) capabilities. Additionally, Ford's new Upfit Pro Integration System is now standard, which streamlines the up-fitting process for interior emergency response equipment on new police vehicles.

Mechanically, power-trains were carried over, with the 3.3L Hybrid V6 returning as the standard engine choice. However, a new manual pursuit mode has been added to supplant the automatic pursuit mode feature; it enhances drive-ability and power delivery in heavy-traffic emergency response driving situations.

Moreover, several additional safety features are now standard. Automatic emergency braking is now standard along with blind spot monitoring and cross traffic brake assist. In addition, Ford's Police Perimeter Alerts system, which was previously optional, is now standard.

The updated 2025 FPIU was available to order beginning on February 15, 2024.

Ford Police Interceptor Utility Performance Specs (based on Michigan State Police testing):

Engine	Displacement	Power	Torque	Notes	0-60/Top Speed
3.5 L EcoBoost V6	213 CID	365 hp (272 kW)	350 lb⋅ft (475 N⋅m)	Twin-turbocharged, late availability; 2014–2019.	0 to 60 mph (0 to 97 km/h): 6.6 seconds. 132 mph (212 km/h) top speed.
3.7 L V6	227 CID	304 hp (227 kW)	279 lb⋅ft (378 N⋅m)	2013–2019; base engine.	0–60: 7.9 seconds. 132 mph (212 km/h) top speed.
3.3 L V6	201 CID	285 hp (213 kW)	260 lb⋅ft (353 N⋅m)	Naturally aspirated; 2020–	0–60: 8.1 seconds. 136 mph (219 km/h) top speed.
3.3 L Hybrid V6	201 CID	318 hp (237 kW)	322 lb⋅ft (437 N⋅m)	Hybrid--(horsepower/torque are combined ratings), base engine; 2020–	0–60: 7.2 seconds. 136 mph (219 km/h) top speed.
3.0 L EcoBoost V6	183 CID	400 hp (298 kW)	415 lb⋅ft (563 N⋅m)	Twin-turbocharged; 2020–	0–60: 5.5 seconds. 148 mph (238 km/h) top speed.

=== Mazda Navajo ===
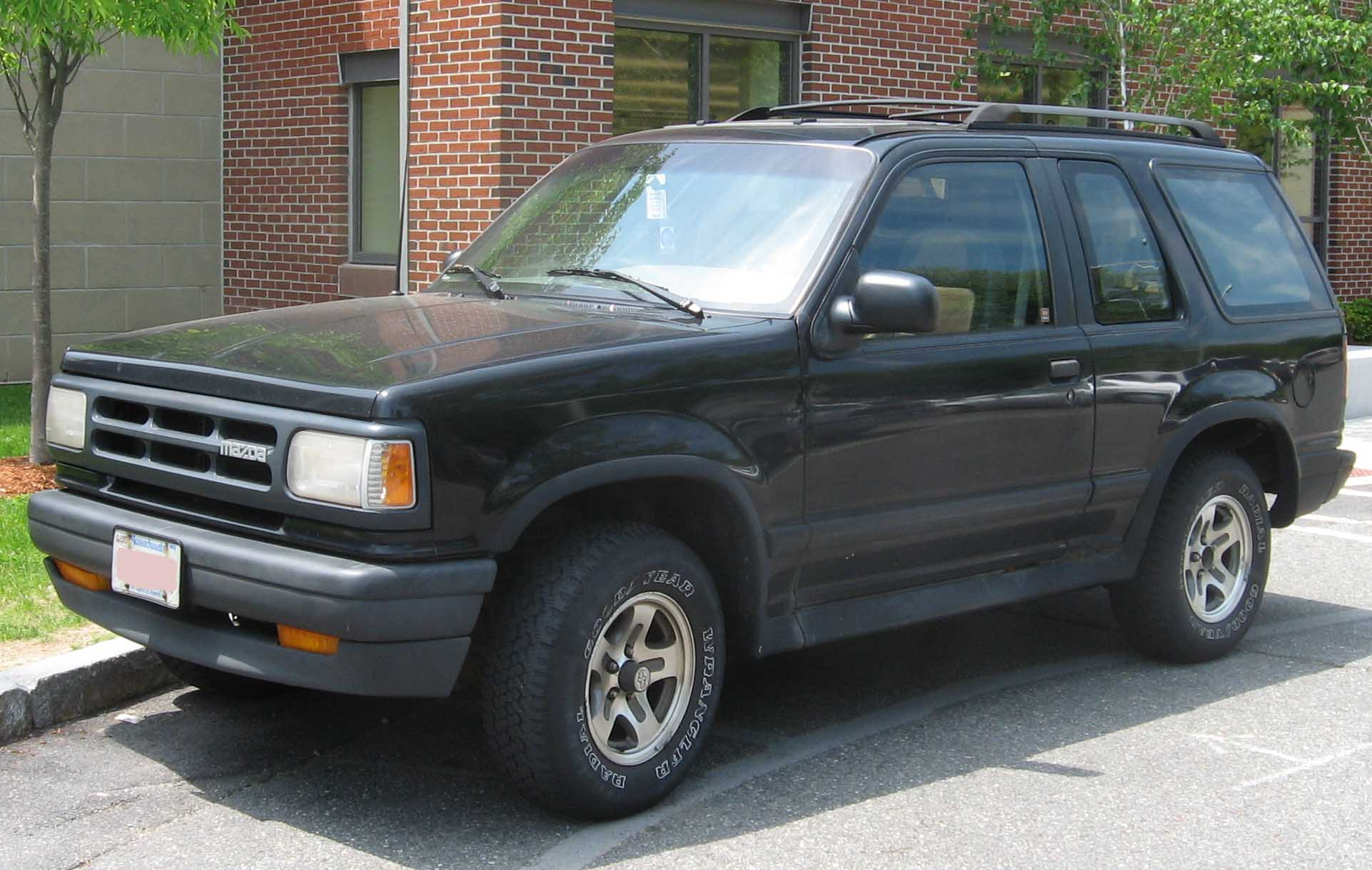
Mazda Navajo

The first-generation Ford Explorer was sold by Mazda from 1991 until 1994 as the Mazda Navajo. Offered solely in a three-door configuration, only minor design details differed the Navajo from its Ford counterpart.

In the early 1990s, SUVs transitioned into alternatives to station wagons, leading to a decline in demand for two-door SUVs. After the 1994 model year, Mazda withdrew the Navajo, returning in 2000 with the four-door Tribute (a counterpart of the Ford Escape).

=== Mercury Mountaineer ===
The Ford Explorer was sold by the Mercury division as the Mercury Mountaineer from 1997 until 2010. Developed as a competitor for the Oldsmobile Bravada, the Mountaineer was a four-door SUV slotted above the Explorer Limited. Marking the reintroduction of the waterfall grille to the Mercury brand, the model line was distinguished by two-tone (and later monochromatic) styling different from the Explorer.

Coinciding with the 2010 closure of the Mercury brand, the Mountaineer was withdrawn after the 2010 model year; three generations were produced, with the Mountaineer serving as the largest Mercury SUV (above the Mariner).

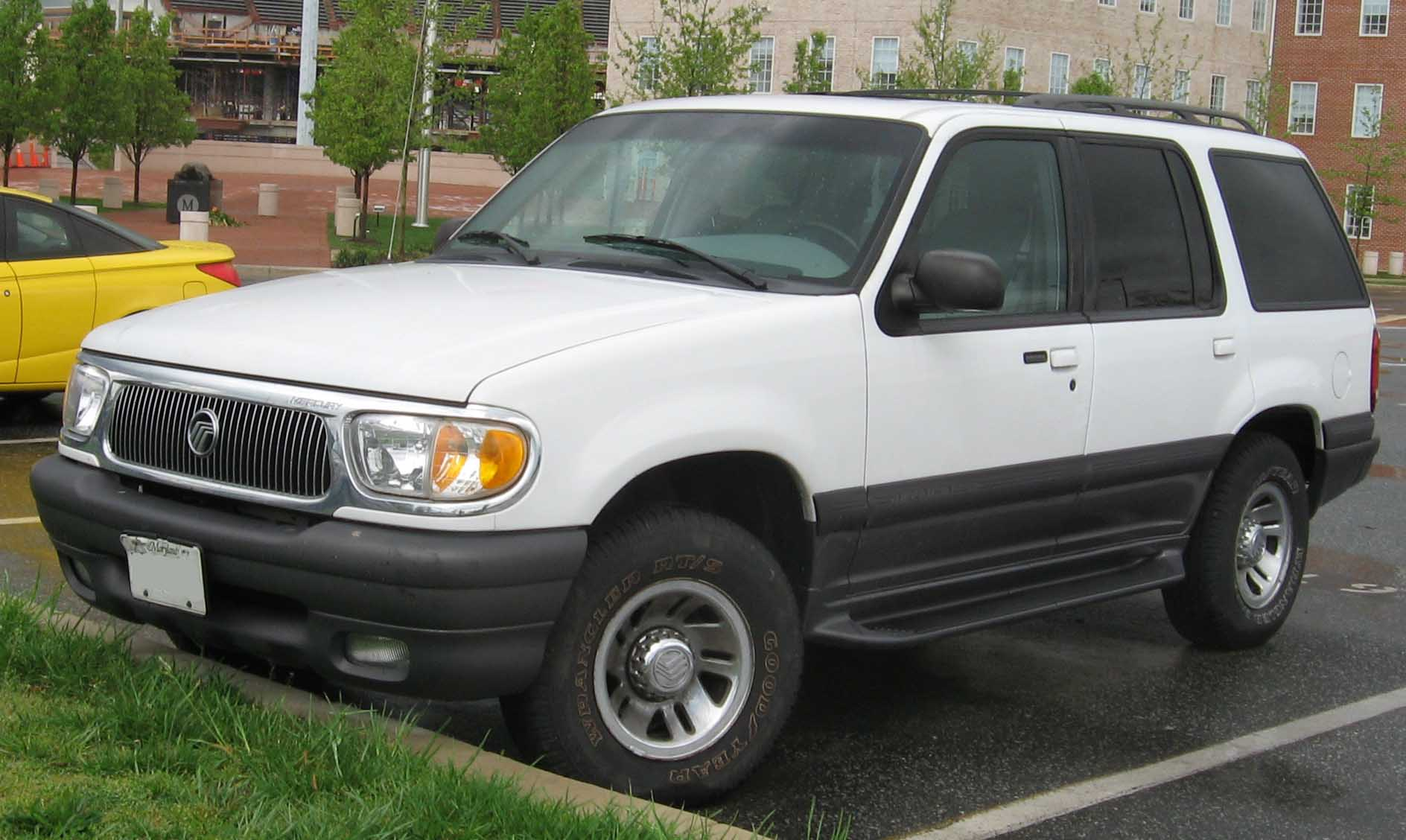
1998-2001 Mercury Mountaineer

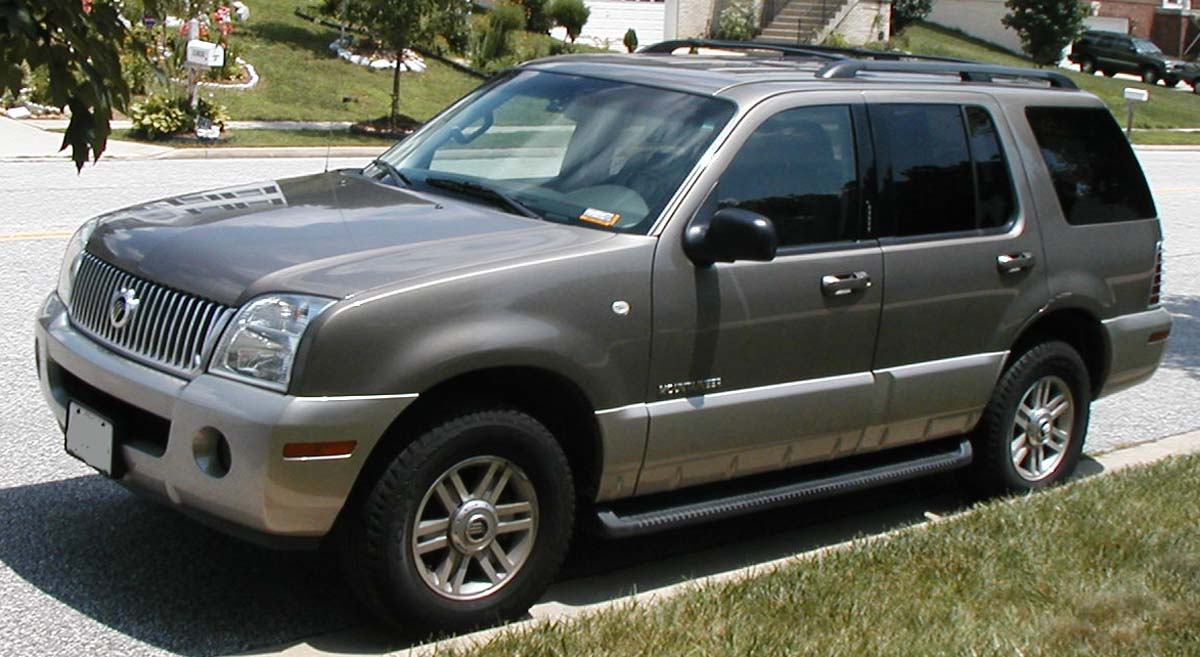
2002-2005 Mercury Mountaineer

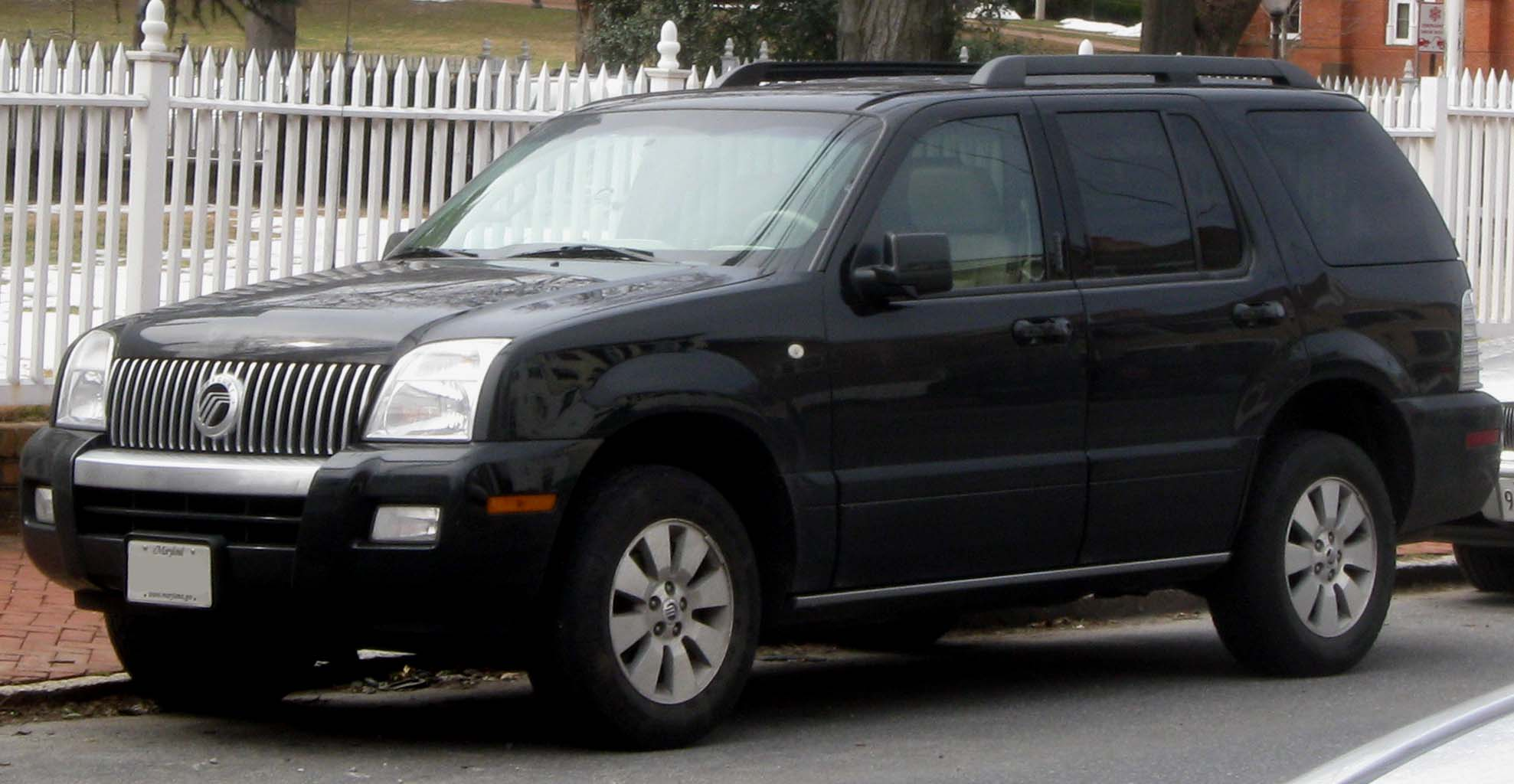
2006-2010 Mercury Mountaineer

=== Lincoln Aviator ===
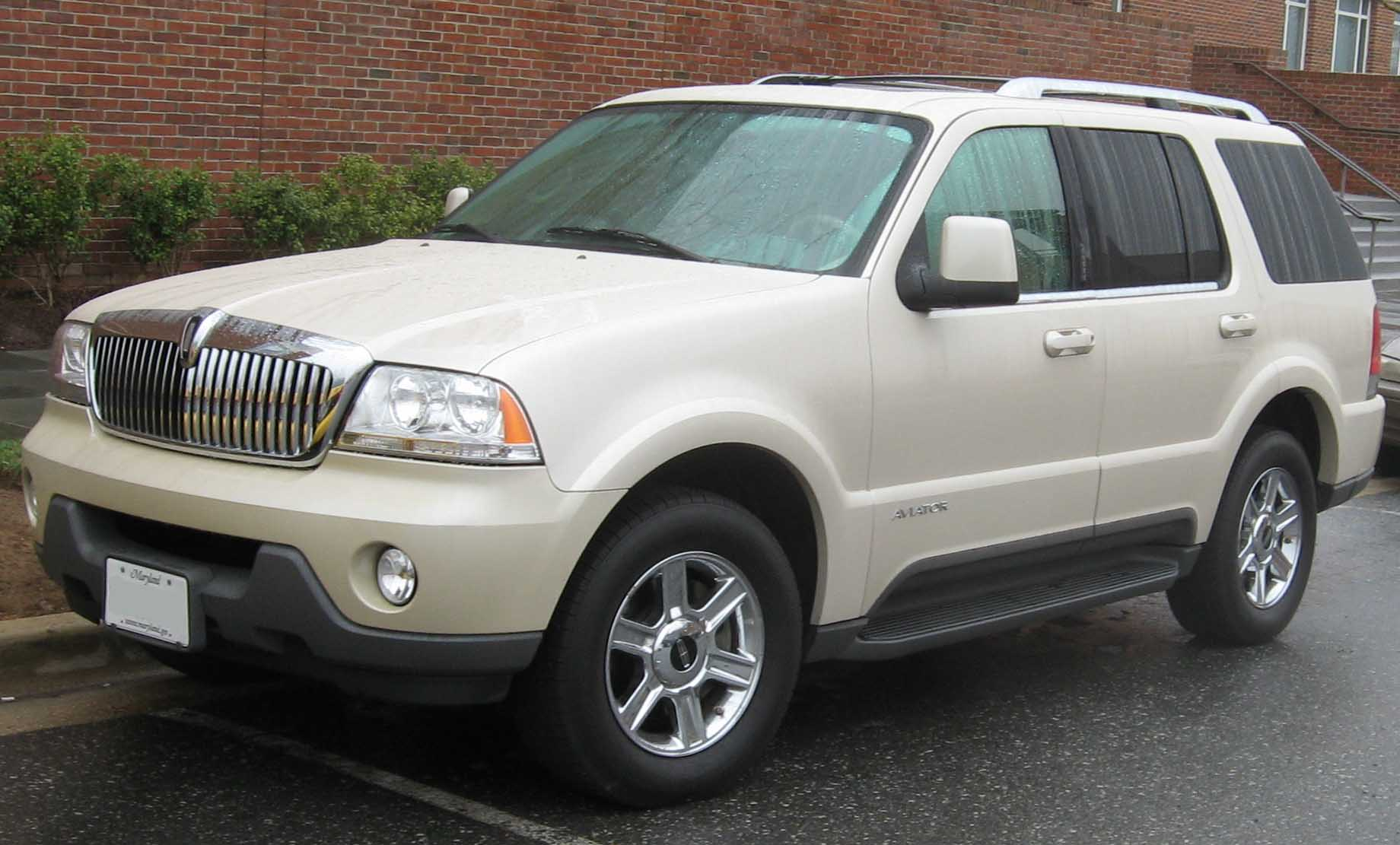
Lincoln Aviator (first generation)

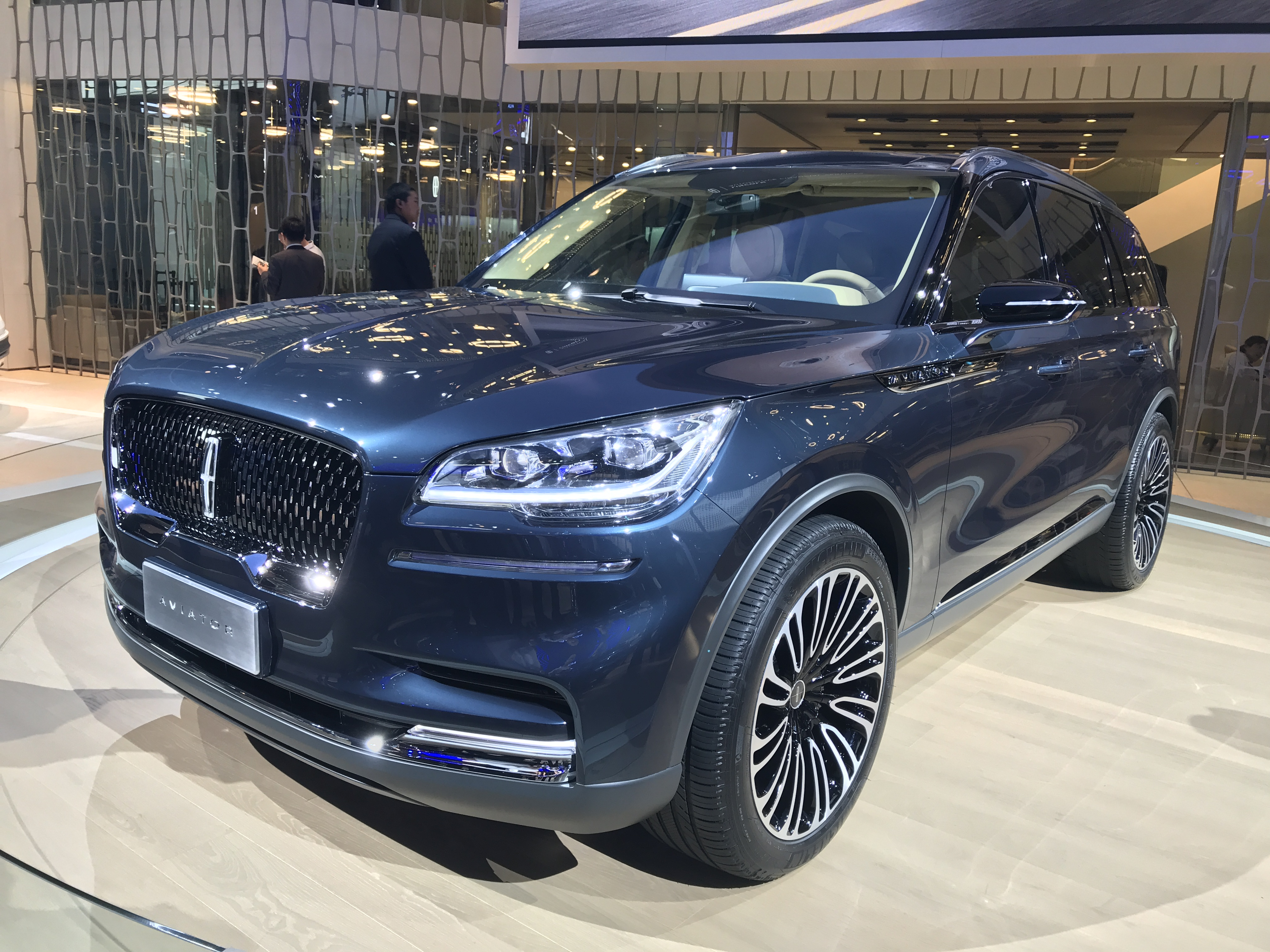
Lincoln Aviator (second generation)

The Explorer has been sold twice by the Lincoln division as the Lincoln Aviator. From 2003 through 2005, the Lincoln Aviator was marketed as a counterpart of the third-generation Explorer. The first mid-size SUV sold by Lincoln, the model line was slotted between the Mercury Mountaineer and the Lincoln Navigator. Following the introduction of the fourth-generation Explorer, the model line was repackaged as a CUV based on the Ford Edge and renamed the Lincoln MKX (today the Lincoln Nautilus).

For 2020, the Lincoln Aviator was revived (after a 14-year hiatus) as a mid-size SUV; as before, the model line is a Lincoln counterpart of the Ford Explorer (now the sixth generation) and the Lincoln Navigator. The second-generation Aviator is the first Lincoln vehicle offered with plug-in hybrid capability as an option; its 494 hp (368 kW) combined output is the highest-ever for a Lincoln vehicle.

== Export sales ==
=== UK models ===
In the UK, the Ford Explorer was initially available as just one model, with the 4.0 L engine and with a high specification – the only dealer options being a leather interior. Second and third-generation Explorers for the UK and other RHD markets utilized a center console-mounted shifter and hand parking brake instead of the steering column-mounted shifter and parking brake pedal used in the North American models. In 1998, a facelifted Explorer was available with minor cosmetic interior changes and a revised rear tail lift that centered the rear number plate. In 1999 the model range was revamped slightly, the base model becoming the XLT and a special edition North Face version marketed with a tie-in to North Face outdoor clothing. The North Face version was available in dark green or silver, with body-colored bumpers, heated leather seats, and a CD multichanger as standard. In 2000, the North Face was also available in black.

=== Middle East and Asia ===
In Korea, the Middle East, Taiwan, and China, the 2012 Ford Explorer was available in several trims, all with a 3.5 L V6 engine and an automatic gearbox. Some GCC markets offer the front-wheel-drive version as a base model, while most of the trims have standard all-wheel-drive. The latest generation Explorer was made available in Japan the Fall of 2015.

=== Exports ===
As of 2009, the Explorer is also sold in Bolivia, Chile, Canada, Mexico, Panama, the Dominican Republic, Japan, South Korea, Israel, the Republic of China (Taiwan), the Philippines, Russia, Iceland, Germany, the Middle East, and certain countries in South America and Africa.

As of 2014, the Explorer is also available in Ukraine and Belarus. As of 2018, American-made Explorers are also exported to Vietnam.

== Criticism and controversies ==
=== Rollover and Firestone Tire controversy ===
240 deaths and 3,000 catastrophic injuries resulted from the combination of early-generation Explorers and Firestone tires. The tire tread separated and the vehicle had an unusually high rate of rollover crash as a result. Both companies' reputations were tarnished. This event led to a disruption in the 90-year-old Ford/Firestone partnership.

Rollover risk is inherently higher in truck-based vehicles, like the Explorer, than in ordinary passenger cars, as a modification for bulky 4-wheel-drive hardware requires increases in height to avoid compromising ground clearance (raising the center of gravity), while a short wheelbase further reduces stability. The previous Bronco II had already been cited by Consumer Reports for rollover tendencies in turns.

The Explorer was cleared by the NHTSA as no more dangerous than any other truck when driven unsafely. It used the same tires as the Ford Ranger with a relatively low rating for high temperatures. Lowering tire pressure recommendations softened the ride further and improved emergency stability through increased traction, but increased the chances of overheating tires. A 1995 redesign with a new suspension slightly raised the Explorer's center of gravity, but it was called inconsequential by a Ford spokesman. Memos by Ford engineers suggested lowering the engine height, but it would have increased the cost of the new design.

Explorer rollover rates, at the time of the controversy, were higher than any of its competitors. While Firestone turned out millions of sub-standard and potentially defective tires and was the initial cause of loss of control on many Ford Explorer Firestone tire tread separation rollovers, the blame shifted towards Ford for a defectively designed and unstable vehicle.

In May 2000, the US National Highway Traffic Safety Administration (NHTSA) contacted Ford and Firestone about a higher-than-normal incidence of tire failures on Ford Explorers, Mercury Mountaineers, and Mazda Navajos fitted with Firestone tires (later including Ford Ranger and Mazda B-Series pickup trucks). The failures all involved tread separation, in which the outer tread carcass would delaminate and cause a rapid loss of tire pressure. Ford investigated and found that several models of 15 in (381 mm) Firestone tires (ATX, ATX II, and Wilderness AT) had higher failure rates, especially those made at Firestone's Decatur, Illinois plant.

Ford recommended tire inflation of only 26 pounds per square inch (179 kPa) likely contributing to the tread separation problem by causing the tires to operate at higher than normal temperatures.

Ford argued that Firestone was at fault, noting that the tires made by Firestone were very defective. Nevertheless, Ford subsequently recommended that front and rear tires should be inflated to 30 pounds per square inch (207 kPa) on all Explorer models and mailed a replacement tire pressure door sticker indicating the same to all registered owners.

Some have argued that poor driver reaction to tire blowouts was a contributing factor. When a tire blew, the vehicle would experience a sudden sharp jerk, and many drivers reacted by counter-steering in an attempt to regain control. This action would cause a shift of the vehicle's weight, resulting in a rollover especially at higher speeds (many reports of rollovers were of vehicles being driven at speeds of 70 mph (113 km/h) and above). In a test simulating dozens of tire blowouts, Larry Webster, a test-driver for Car and Driver magazine, was repeatedly able to bring a 1994 Explorer to a stop without incident from speeds of 70 mph (113 km/h). According to Forbes magazine, car experts and NHTSA claim that the vast majority of crash accidents and deaths were caused not by the vehicle, but by the driver, by road conditions or some combination of the two.

In response to Firestone's allegations of the Explorer's design defects, NHTSA undertook a preliminary investigation and reported that further action was not required. Its conclusion was that the Explorer was no more prone to rollover than other SUVs given their high center of gravity. Congress would pass the TREAD Act and the NHTSA would subsequently implement FMVSS 138. The subsequent introduction and proliferation of electronic stability control systems, along with lowering the vehicle, widening the track, and introducing independent rear suspension, have essentially addressed and mitigated this shortcoming.

In May 2001, Ford announced it would replace 13 million Firestone tires fitted to Explorer vehicles.

=== U-Haul trailers ===
On December 22, 2003, U-Haul, the largest American equipment rental company, announced it would prohibit its outlets from renting trailers to persons planning to tow behind Ford Explorers due to liability concerns, with no published data to substantiate the claim. Unofficial reports from employees indicated that it was due to the rear bumper separating from the vehicle, including the tow hook assembly. U-Haul did not alter its policies regarding the renting of trailers to persons planning to tow behind the Mercury Mountaineer, Mazda Navajo or earlier versions of the Lincoln Aviator, which are all mechanically identical to the Ford Explorer. In mid-2013, U-Haul began allowing Ford Explorers of model year 2011 and newer to tow their trailers. All other Ford Motor Company vehicles are allowed to tow U-Haul trailers.

=== Reliability ===
==== Timing Chain ====
The 4.0 L SOHC V6 engine found on second, third, and fourth generation Explorers was notorious for the plastic OEM timing chain guides, cassettes, and tensioners breaking resulting in timing chain ticking, rattle or "death rattle". This problem can occur as early as 45,000 mi (72,000 km) in some vehicles. When the engine is running for an extended period of time with this issue, the engine can jump timing or cease running, damaging the heads and valves.

Timing chain rattle was mitigated in later years of the SOHC (in most vehicles, after 2002) with updated cassettes and tensioners.

==== Transmission ====
The 5R55 series transmissions found on second through fourth-generation Explorers were also notorious for premature failures. Common issues with this transmission include but are not limited to solenoid pack failure, harsh gear engagement, servo pin bore wear, premature transmission case wear, and excessive valve body wear.

==== Water pump ====
Water pumps on 2011 through 2019 Ford Explorer and 2013 through 2019 Ford Police Interceptor Utility equipped with the 3.5 L V6, 3.5 L EcoBoost V6, and 3.7 L V6 have a tendency to fail and potentially ruin the engine when they do. The water pumps on these engines are internally mounted and driven by the timing chain. As a result, when they fail, antifreeze is dumped directly into the crankcase; mixing with engine oil and potentially damaging the head gaskets and connecting rod bearings. Many of these water pump failures occur without warning and repairs often cost thousands of dollars as the engine needs to be disassembled or removed from the vehicle to access the water pump. In some cases, the engine will need to be replaced outright. A class-action lawsuit was started against Ford as a result of this issue. In 2020 the class-action lawsuit was dismissed with prejudice by a judge stating the plaintiffs failed to present any arguments that Ford knew or should have known the water pumps were defective.

==== 4WD Transfer Case / Power Takeoff Unit (PTU) ====
The 2011 through 2019 Explorer and Police Interceptor Utility models equipped with 4WD may experience severe issues with the four wheel drive system. Due to the transfer case/power takeoff unit's close proximity to other high-heat components such as the exhaust manifold and transmission, along well as its small fluid capacity (about 0.5 U.S. quarts), it may be subject to repeated overheating resulting in internal bearing wear and premature failure. Common symptoms of a failed PTU include grinding or whining noises coming from under the vehicle, a natural-gas or oil type odor emitting from the engine bay, fluid leaks, and in severe instances, the vehicle will not move. Ford has made several design revisions to the PTU over the years to combat failure, including the addition of a fluid drain plug, temperature sensor, an external oil cooler (on select models), and revisions to the internal idler bearing.

=== 2024 recall ===
In January 2024, Ford began the process of urging a recall of nearly 1.9 million Explorer SUVs between the 2011 and 2019 model years amid reports that trim pieces of vehicles could fly off. The recalls warnings are set to be issued to owners of these vehicles starting March 13, 2024.

=== 2026 recall ===
In June 2026 Ford issued a recall order of over 741,000 vehicles, including the Explorer, in the U.S. due to a transmission issue that may damage the park system.

== Sales ==
Calendar year	Explorer (US)	(US) Police Interceptor	Canada	Mexico	China
1990	140,509	—N/a			
1991	282,837	—N/a		222	
1992	292,069	—N/a			
1993	301,668	—N/a			
1994	278,065	—N/a		1,254	
1995	395,227	—N/a		784	
1996	402,663	—N/a		1,112	
1997	383,852	—N/a		2,930	
1998	431,488	—N/a		6,222	
1999	428,772	—N/a			
2000	445,157	—N/a			
2001	415,921	—N/a		5,877	
2002	433,847	—N/a		5,692	
2003	373,118	—N/a		5,008	
2004	339,333	—N/a		4,033	
2005	239,788	—N/a		3,550	
2006	179,229	—N/a		3,989	
2007	137,817	—N/a		2,063	
2008	78,439	—N/a		2,279	
2009	52,190	—N/a		1,736	
2010	60,687	—N/a		2,009	
2011	135,179	—N/a		4,107	
2012	158,344	5,863	10,427	4,304	
2013	178,311	14,086	10,772	4,019	
2014	189,339	20,655	12,677	3,427	
2015	224,309	24,942	15,615	3,562	
2016	216,294	32,213	15,275	3,197	
2017	238,056	33,075	17,283	1,910	
2018	227,732	33,839	18,289	2,479	
2019	168,309	18,752	9,667	1,627	
2020	226,217		15,283	1,072	
2021	219,871		16,391	1,192	
2022	207,673		15,766	1,519	
2023	186,799		10,667	1,052	27,050
2024	194,094		11,379	2,047	19,400
2025	222,706		15,718	3,375	13,611

== See also ==
- Ford Explorer Sport Trac
- Mercury Mountaineer
- Lincoln Aviator
- Saleen XP6
- Saleen XP8
- Firestone and Ford tire controversy
