= Ford-Utilimaster FFV =

American light transport truck model

Ford-Utilimaster Flexible Fuel Vehicle
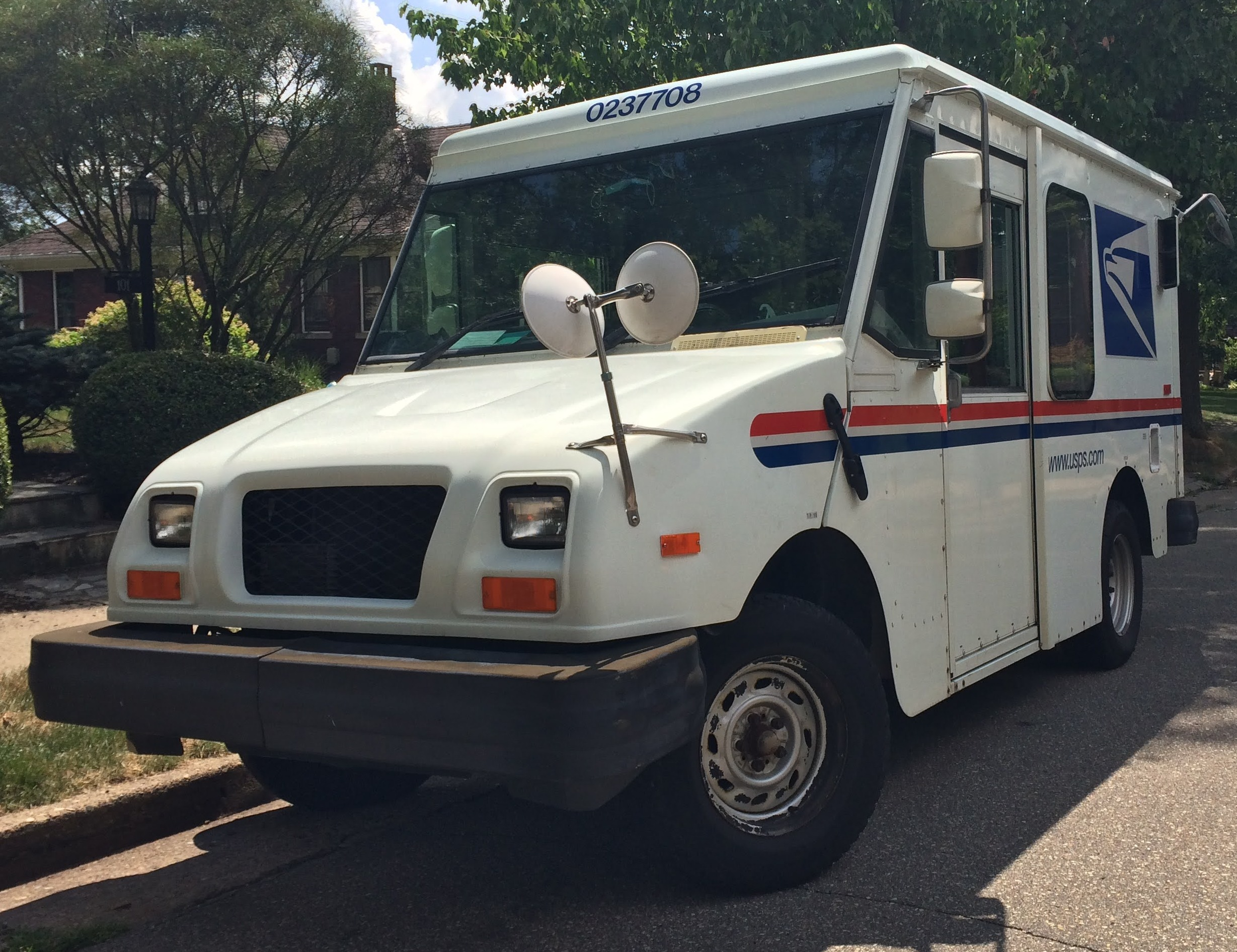
- A 2000 FFV of the United States Postal Service, seen in Mount Lebanon, Pennsylvania, in August 2020.

Overview
- Manufacturer: Utilimaster
- Also called: USPS Mail truck
- Production: 1999–2001
- Assembly: United States: Hazelwood, Missouri (chassis); Wakarusa, Indiana (body)

Body and chassis
- Class: Mail truck
- Layout: Front-engine, rear-wheel drive; Front-engine, four-wheel drive
- Related: Ford Explorer

Powertrain
- Engine: 4.0 L (245 cu in) Cologne V6
- Transmission: 5-speed Ford 5R55E automatic

Chronology
- Predecessor: Grumman LLV
- Successor: Oshkosh NGDV

The Ford-Utilimaster Flexible Fuel Vehicle (FFV; originally designated the Carrier Route Vehicle) is an American light transport truck model, designed as a mail truck for the United States Postal Service (USPS), which is its primary user. It was built as a partnership between Ford Motor Company, which supplied a stripped-down, right-hand drive Ford Explorer chassis and drivetrain, and Utilimaster, which built the aluminum body and integrated it with the chassis. The FFV can operate on either unleaded gasoline or E85 ethanol-blended fuel using the Ford 4.0 L Cologne OHV V6 engine.

The FFV is similar in appearance to and has the same purpose as the earlier Grumman LLV; it can be distinguished from the LLV by the presence of a cargo-area window behind the street-side sliding door of the FFV.

== History ==
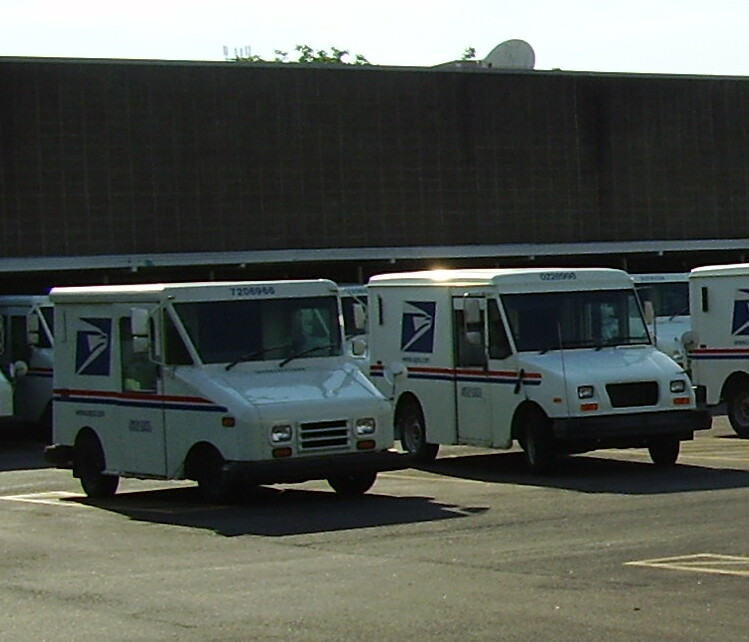
LLV (left) and FFV (right)

The USPS solicited an offer to bid from Ford and Utilimaster in August 1998 for a fleet order of 10,000 vehicles to replace Jeep DJ-5 delivery vehicles. At the time, the phased implementation of the Energy Policy Act of 1992 required that 75% of federal fleet acquisitions were alternative fuel vehicles in fiscal year 1999. The contract was awarded a month later in September 1998; the first batch of 12 prototypes was completed and delivered for inspection within six months, by March 1999, which required Ford to retool its St. Louis Assembly Plant and Utilimaster to design and build a new body assembly plant. The prototypes were tested between March and July, and the feedback provided was incorporated into the final inspection vehicle, delivered on August 30, less than a year after the initial contract award.

The first production FFV was completed as the "USPS Carrier Route Vehicle" on December 17, 1999. The initial contract for 10,000 FFVs was completed in September 2000. The per-unit cost of the FFV in 2001 was US$20,537 (equivalent to $37,300 in 2025), and the final total order was for 21,275 FFVs, delivered in 2000 and 2001. In 2010, the USPS owned 21,137 FFVs, compared to 141,319 LLVs.

== Technical ==
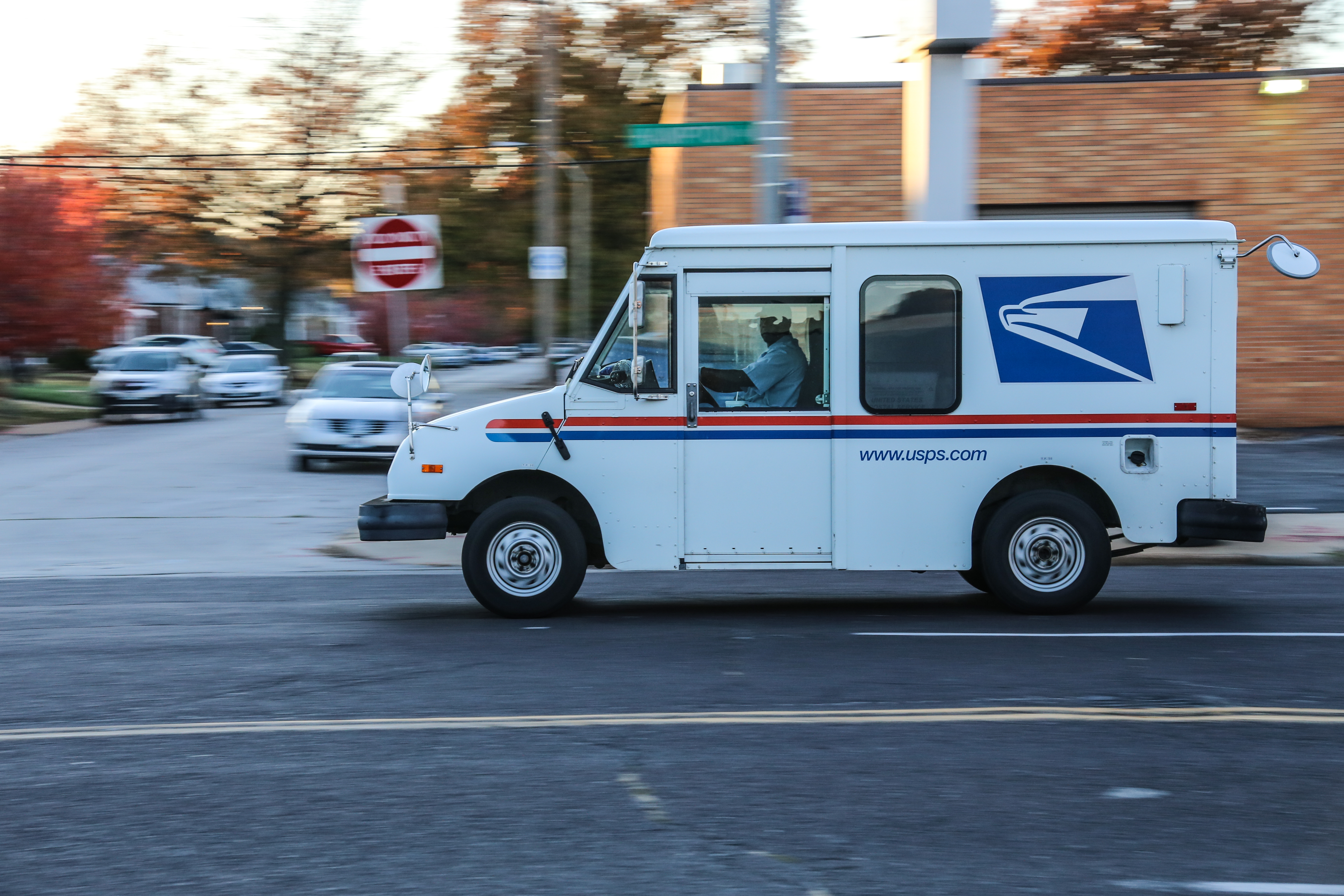
FFV operating in St Louis; note cargo area window

The right-hand drive Explorer chassis were built at Ford's St. Louis Assembly Plant, including an aluminum dash panel; the completed chassis were shipped to Utilimaster's Wakarusa, Indiana plant for final assembly. The ladder frame chassis had a C-shaped cross section and six cross-members. At 17 ft (5.2 m) long, it is approximately 2 ft (0.61 m) longer than an LLV and has a larger cargo volume. Among the new safety features Utilimaster has added a window on the left hand side of the truck for better visibility in these right-hand-drive trucks.

The FFV was equipped with a 3:55:1 final drive limited-slip rear axle, powered by the 4.0L Cologne V6 through a 5-speed automatic transmission. The engine had a peak output of 160 hp (162 PS; 119 kW) at 4,000 RPM and 225 lb⋅ft (305 N⋅m; 31 kg⋅m) at 2,750 RPM. It rides on 15 in (380 mm) steel wheels and LT195/75R15C tires. Anecdotal evidence shows that some FFVs have four-wheel-drive. The FFV has an average observed fuel consumption of 6.9 mpg_{‑US} (34.1 L/100 km; 8.3 mpg_{‑imp}), worse than the 8.2 mpg_{‑US} (28.7 L/100 km; 9.8 mpg_{‑imp}) of the LLVs and slightly better than the 6.3 mpg_{‑US} (37.3 L/100 km; 7.6 mpg_{‑imp}) of the commercial off-the-shelf Mercedes Metris vans that have been used to supplement the fleet.

At the time they were acquired, the only flexible fuel-capable engines were 6-cylinder types, which proved to be heavier and less fuel efficient than the 4-cylinder engines in the LLVs; in addition, E85 has less energy than gasoline, by volume, and it was estimated the USPS used 587,000 US gal (489,000 imp gal; 2,220,000 L) of E85 in fiscal year 2010 at a cost premium of US$135,700 (equivalent to $200,400 in 2025) compared to using gasoline vehicles. In Fiscal Year 2005, it was estimated that only 1,000 of the FFVs were using E85 regularly, consuming 582,000 US gal (485,000 imp gal; 2,200,000 L) with a 26% decrease in fuel economy.
