= Grumman LLV =

American light transport truck model

Grumman Long Life Vehicle
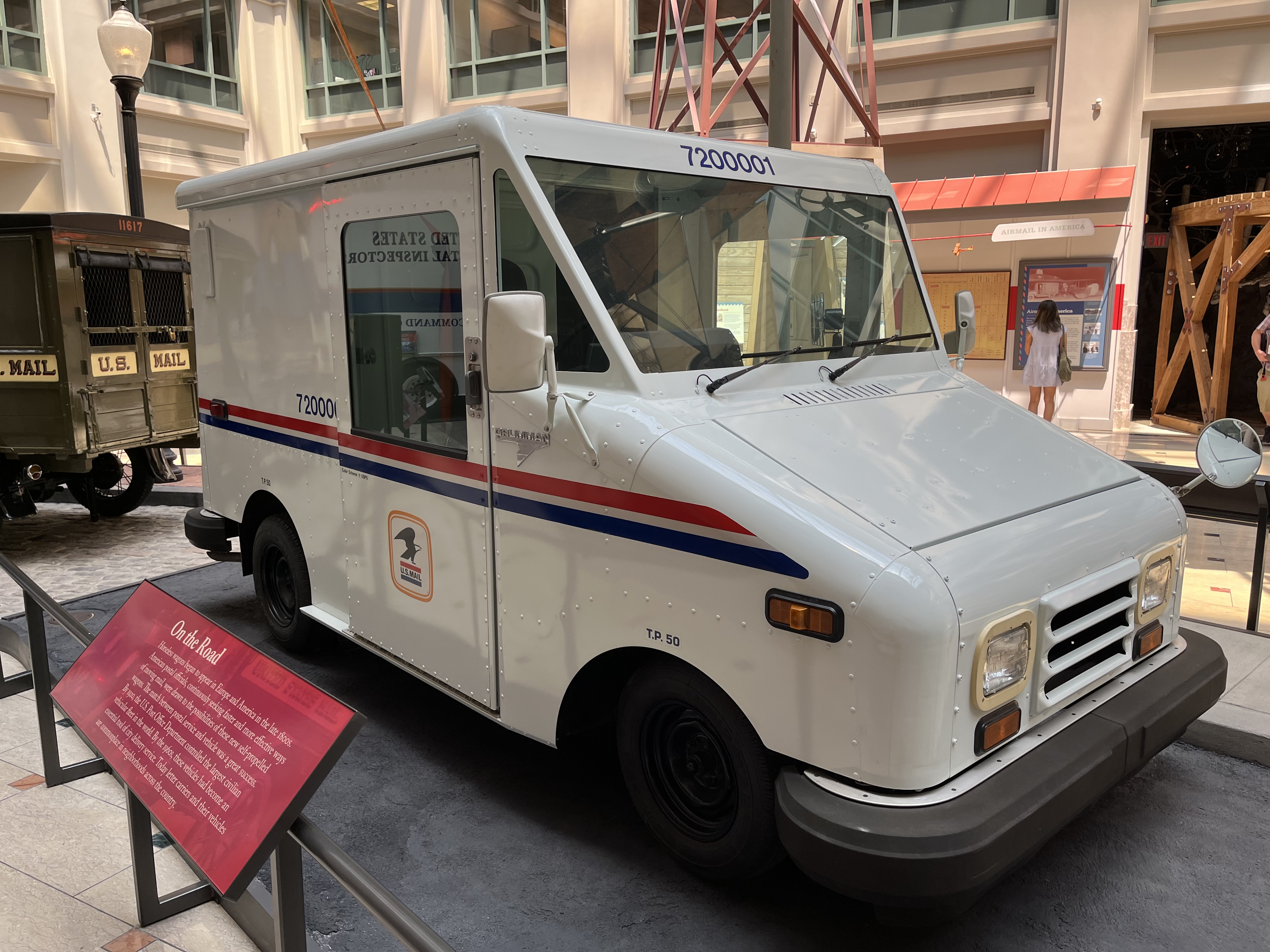
- 1987 Grumman LLV in the National Postal Museum

Overview
- Manufacturer: Grumman
- Production: 1986–1994
- Assembly: United States: Montgomery, Pennsylvania

Body and chassis
- Class: Mail truck
- Layout: Front-engine, rear-wheel drive
- Related: KurbWatt, Kubvan

Powertrain
- Engine: 2.2 L (134 cu in) LN2 I4; 2.5 L (151 cu in) LN8/L38 I4
- Transmission: 3-speed GM TH180 automatic

Suspension
- Front: 54.1 in (1,374 mm)
- Rear: 63 in (1,600 mm)

Dimensions
- Wheelbase: 100.5 in (2,553 mm)
- Length: 175.5 in (4,458 mm)
- Width: 75 in (1,905 mm)
- Height: 85 in (2,159 mm)
- Curb weight: 2,700 lb (1,225 kg)

Chronology
- Predecessor: Jeep Dispatcher
- Successor: Ford-Utilimaster FFV; Oshkosh NGDV

The Grumman Long Life Vehicle (LLV) is a mail truck model primarily used by the United States Postal Service. The LLV is based on a Chevrolet S-10 pickup truck chassis with a custom aluminum body, and was manufactured by Grumman from 1986 to 1994. Most LLVs were sold to the USPS, although some were purchased by other customers, including Canada Post. The LLV design is optimized for local mail delivery, featuring right hand drive and a small turning radius for easy access to mailboxes.

The LLV was designed for a long service life of 24 years, and the USPS has kept its fleet in service well past its planned lifespan. The USPS had over 130,000 LLVs in service as of 2024, all of which were past their 30 year service life, making up 57% of the local delivery fleet. The USPS LLV fleet is planned to be replaced by multiple types of vehicles, including commercial off-the-shelf trucks and the Oshkosh Next Generation Delivery Vehicle (NGDV). The first NGDVs entered service in 2024.

== History ==
In the United States, the Grumman LLV is the most common vehicle used by letter carriers for curbside and residential delivery of mail, replacing the previous standard letter-carrier vehicle, the Jeep DJ-5. Curbside delivery from a driver seated in a vehicle to a curbside mailbox is sometimes termed "mounted delivery", in contrast to walking delivery.

=== Specification ===
The Grumman LLV was the first vehicle specifically designed for the United States Postal Service. The USPS provided a specification and three teams created prototypes that were tested in Laredo, Texas, in 1985: Grumman in partnership with General Motors, Poveco (a joint venture of Fruehauf and General Automotive Corporation), and American Motors Corporation. The main design points of the vehicle in contract competition were serviceability, handling in confined areas, and overall economical operation. Prototypes were each subjected to a 24,000 mi (39,000 km) road test, including frequent starts and stops, gravel surfaces, cobblestones and potholes, hauling a payload of up to 2,000 lb (910 kg).

Previously, Grumman had built a limited number of KurbWatts, a battery electric vehicle with an aluminum delivery van body, which was tested by the USPS in the early 1980s. At about the same time, Grumman also built 500 KubVans, which used a similar lightweight aluminum delivery body on a Volkswagen Pickup diesel chassis and also underwent testing by the USPS. These designs influenced Grumman's candidate body design for the LLV. Grumman won the competition and was awarded a $1.1 billion contract to produce 99,150 LLVs in April 1986. USPS also held an option for an additional 54,000 LLVs.

=== Production ===
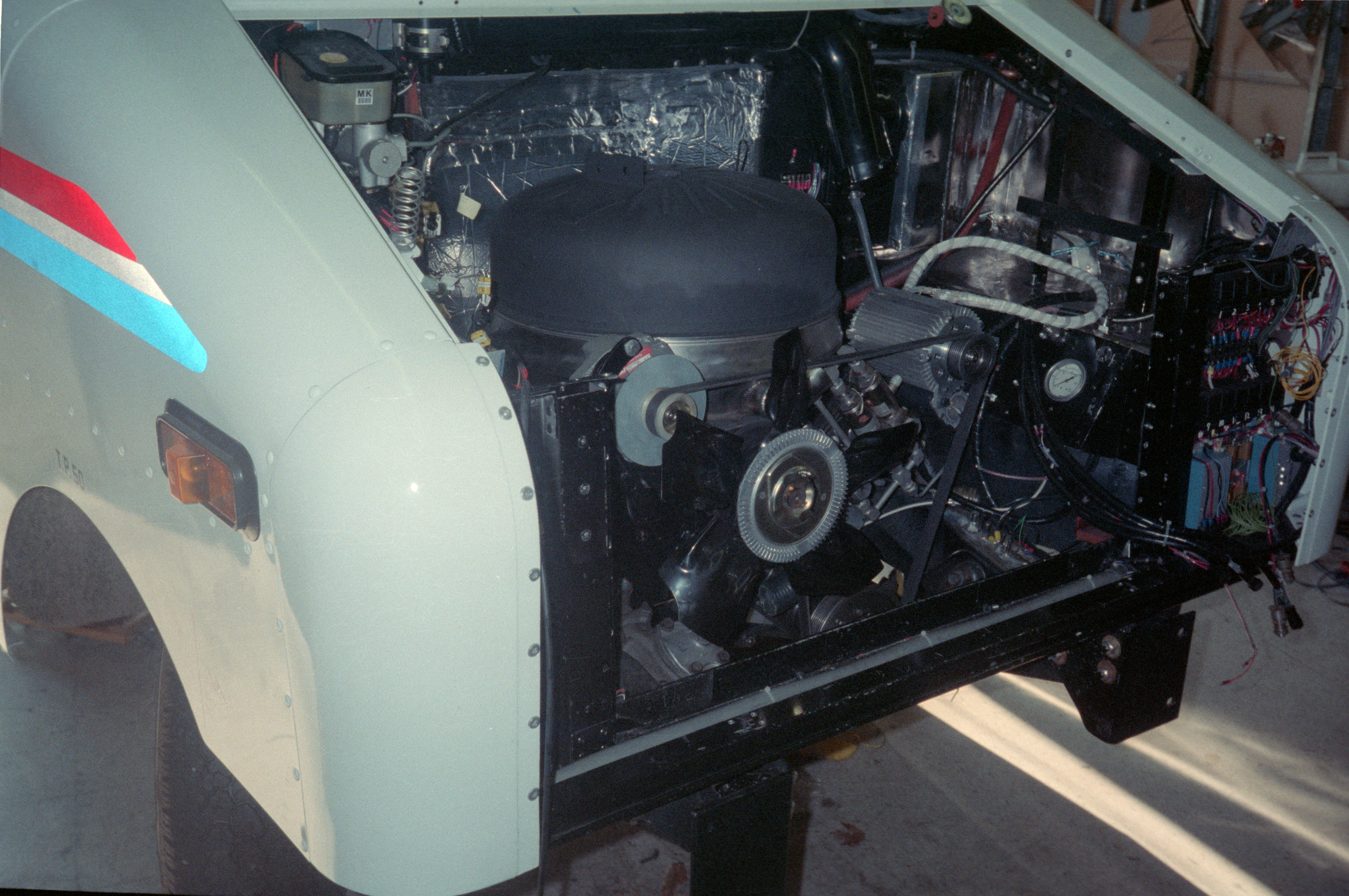
LLV testing at the Glenn Research Center, 1988

The vehicles were assembled by the Allied Division of Grumman in Clinton Township in Lycoming County, Pennsylvania. The first vehicle was completed in April 1986. At peak production, 95 LLVs were completed each day, at a rate of approximately one every five minutes. Grumman invested $28 million into the factory, doubling its size to 213,000 ft^{2} (19,800 m^{2}) and increasing the workforce from 250 to 600.

The USPS purchased more than 100,000 of these vehicles, the last one in 1994. As its name suggests, the Grumman LLV is easily capable of a long life. The required lifespan specified by the U.S. Postal Service was 24 years, but in 2009, this was extended to 30 years. The Grumman LLV can easily last over 200,000 miles on its original engine and transmission before needing an overhaul.

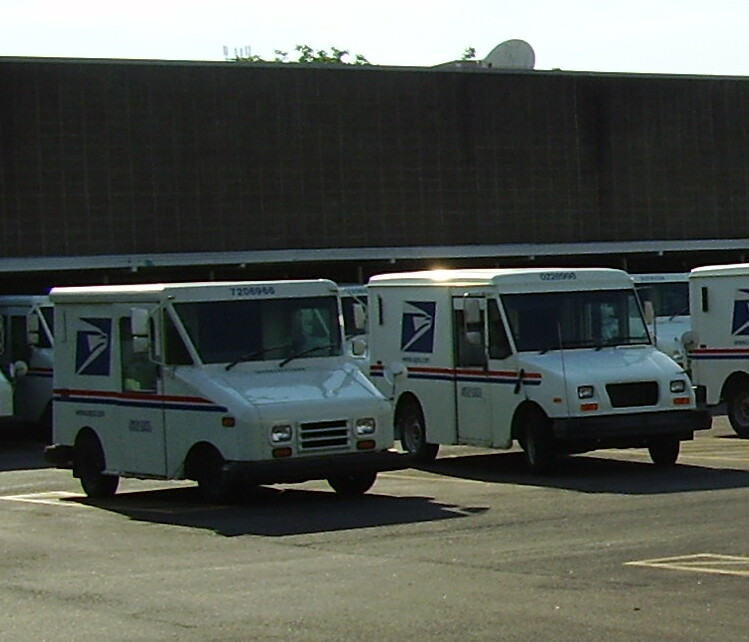
1987 LLV (left) and 2000 FFV (right)

The USPS acquired 21,000 Ford–Utilimaster FFVs in 2000 and 2001 to supplement the LLV fleet. The FFVs have a similar aluminum body and also are right-hand drive, but ride on a chassis built by Ford Motor Company with a body built by Utilimaster.

In 2024, approximately 130,000 LLVs remained in use with the USPS delivery fleet, down from 141,000 in 2010.

== Technical description ==
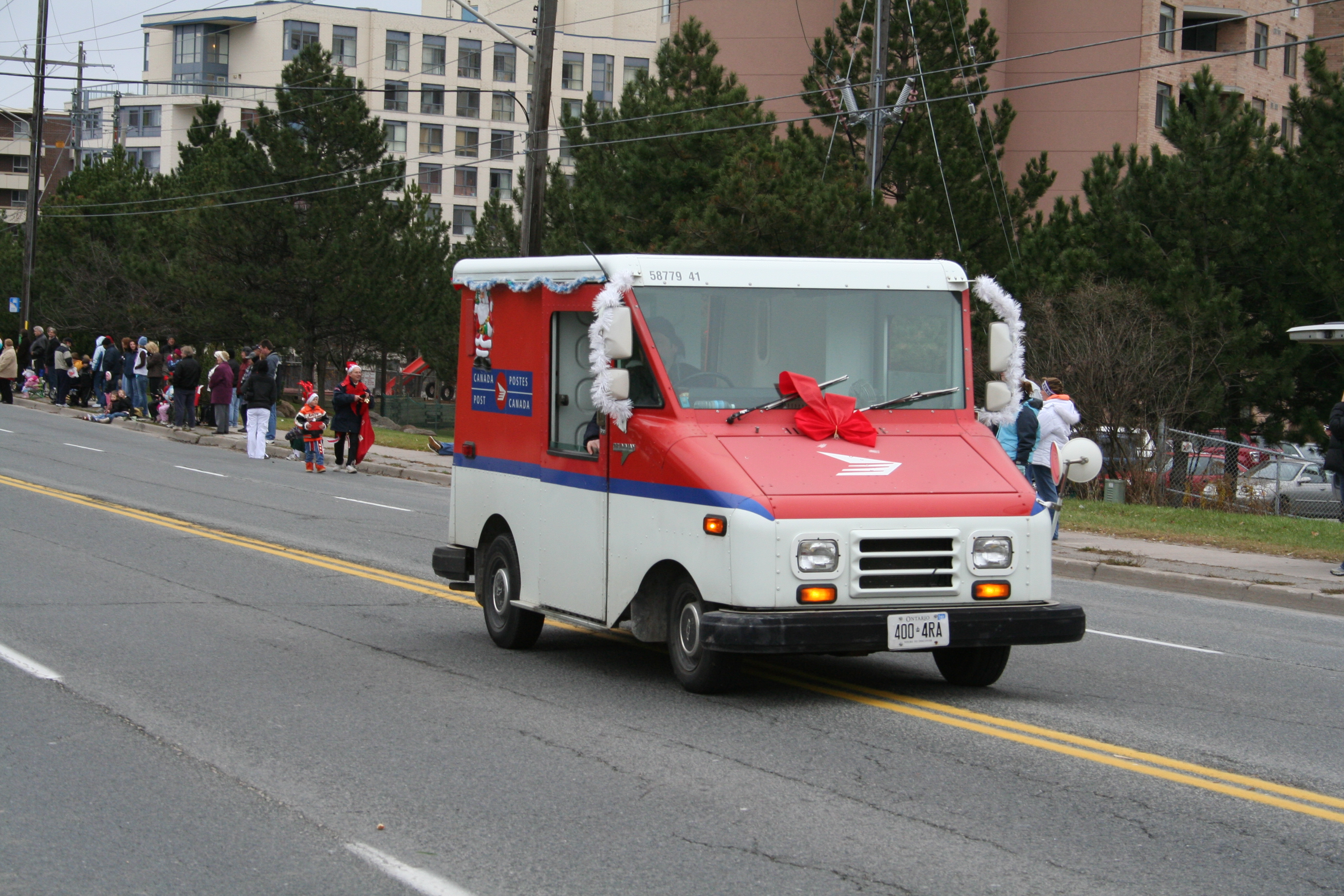
Canada Post LLV in a parade in Newmarket, Ontario, 2006

Like the older postal-service Jeep DJ-5, the Grumman LLV features a right-hand-drive (RHD) configuration, in contrast to the typical left-hand-drive (LHD) position of vehicles in North America. It also features a large metal tray, which is able to hold three trays of letter mail, mounted where a passenger seat would normally be. This arrangement positions the driver on the side of the vehicle closest to the curb, enabling the carrier to easily grab sorted mail and place it into mailboxes without having to leave the seat. Other notable features are an exceptionally tight turning radius and a low-geared, three-speed transmission for hauling heavy cargo. The LLV has a 1,000-pound (450 kg) cargo capacity, double what the Jeep DJ-5 could hold.

The body and final assembly is by Grumman, and the chassis is made by General Motors, based on the 1982 Chevrolet S-10 Blazer, powered by GM engines including the 2.5-liter inline-four TBI Iron Duke and, in later production, 2.2-liter inline-four SPFI LN2; the instrument cluster and front suspension are similar to those used in the Chevrolet S-10 pickup and S-10 Blazer sport utility vehicle.

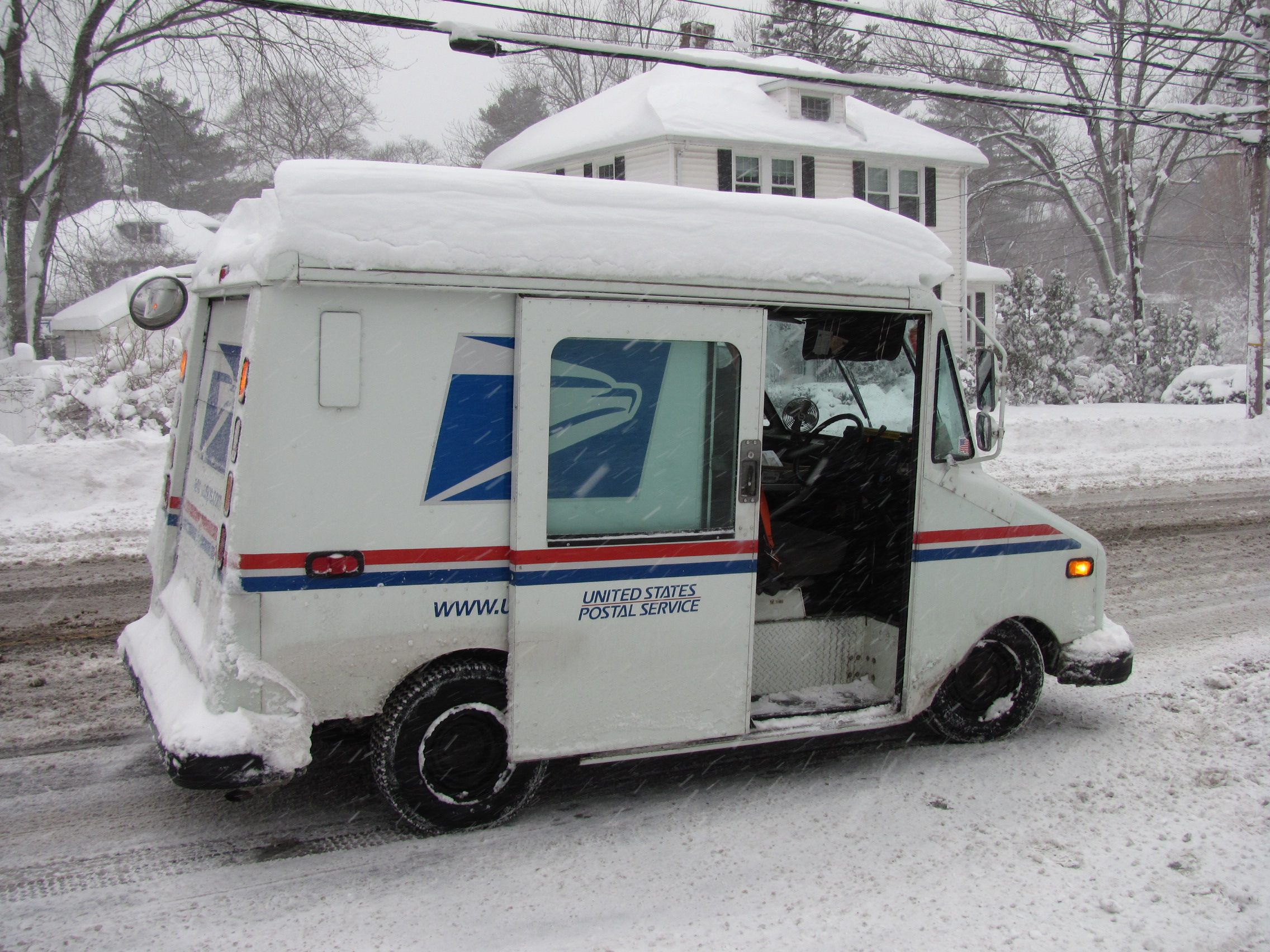
LLV in snow in Lexington, Massachusetts

The LLV has a unique footprint. The front wheels (taken from the two-wheel-drive S-10 Blazer model) have narrower spacing than the rear wheels (using the rear axle from the four-wheel-drive S-10 Blazer model). The front of the vehicle also has low ground clearance. While this has advantages, there are some trade offs. The vehicle was tested successfully in warmer climates, but when used in places with substantial snowfall, they became difficult to control and were poorly adapted to those conditions.

The Grumman LLV's estimated average combined EPA fuel economy is 17 miles per US gallon (13.8 L/100 km; 20.4 mpg_{‑imp}; 7.2 km/L) [16 / 18 mpg_{‑US} (14.7 / 13.1 L/100 km; 19.2 / 21.6 mpg_{‑imp}; 6.8 / 7.7 km/L) on the city/highway cycles, respectively]. In actual use by the USPS, which includes extensive stop-and-go driving for residential delivery, average fuel economy is about 8.2–10 mpg_{‑US} (28.7–23.5 L/100 km; 9.8–12.0 mpg_{‑imp}; 3.5–4.3 km/L).

Like other U.S. Postal Service vehicles before it, the Grumman LLV does not carry a license plate and instead uses a seven-digit U.S. Postal Service serial number. The first digit of the serial number represents the last digit of the year in which it was made, ranging from 7 (model year 1987) to 4 (model year 1994). The second and third digits are the vehicle type code, with the LLV's codes ranging from 19-31. The USPS does not permit reselling LLVs, so when they are retired, they are scrapped for parts and the decals are destroyed; however, at least one was sold by the State of Georgia at auction in 2013.

=== Commercial version ===
Grumman also planned to market a commercial variant of the LLV with right-hand drive as the CLLV through Chevrolet. The CLLV was essentially the same as the LLV, with the same chassis, built by GM at Moraine Assembly using S-10 components, driven by the 2.5L Iron Duke through a 3-speed automatic transmission and a 7-5/8" positraction rear differential with 3.42:1 final drive ratio. The CLLV was rated to carry a payload of 1,400 lb (640 kg), including the driver, and could accommodate up to 121 ft^{3} (3,400 L) of cargo.

=== Electric versions ===
Ten LLVs were converted in 1995, 1997, and 1999 for a pilot program, adding a battery electric drivetrain developed by GM Hughes and U.S. Electricar. They used lead-acid battery chemistry. The resulting Electric Long Life Vehicles (ELLVs) were deployed to post offices in Harbor City, California (in Los Angeles); Westminster, California; and Merrifield, Virginia. When GM canceled its electric vehicle program, the vehicles were taken out of service at the end of 2000.

At about the same time, Transport Canada commissioned Solectria Corporation in November 1998 to convert two LLVs to battery-electric; they were delivered to Canada Post in February 1999. The performance report, comparing the converted LLV to a conventional LLV, was published in February 2000. The Solectria/Grumman LLV was equipped with a 12-kilowatt-hour (43 MJ) lead-acid traction battery and 5-kilowatt (17,000 BTU/h) diesel-fired heater, giving it a nominal range of 30 km (19 mi). The traction motor was an AC induction type, with a peak output of 50 kW (67 hp; 68 PS) and continuous rated output of 20 kW (27 hp; 27 PS). Testing showed the typical consumption on a postal driving cycle was 19.74 kWh/100 km (106.1 mpg‑e) at an ambient temperature of −20 °C (−4 °F), giving a range of 27.39 km (17.02 mi); these figures improved to 16.04 kWh/100 km (130.6 mpg‑e) consumption and 29.58 km (18.38 mi) range at 20 °C (68 °F). By comparison, the conventionally-powered LLV on the same driving cycle returned fuel consumption of 0.22 L/km (11 mpg_{‑US}) at −20 °C (−4 °F) and 0.16 L/km (15 mpg_{‑US}) at 20 °C (68 °F).

This was followed by a larger fleet test, consisting of 500 Electric Carrier Route Vehicles (ECRV) from 2000 to 2003. The ECRV was equipped with a body similar to the LLV, built by Grumman/Allied on a RHD Ford Ranger EV chassis. Most were tested in California, with the remainder tested in Washington, D.C., and White Plains, New York. Southern California Edison tested six prototype ECRVs at the Electric Vehicle Technical Center (EVTC) in Pomona, California. The ECRV uses a 90-horsepower (91 PS; 67 kW) AC induction traction motor driving the rear wheels, drawing power from a 2,000 lb (910 kg) lead-acid battery consisting of 39 modules at 8 volts each, connected in series. It has a curb weight of 4,950 lb (2,250 kg) and a payload of 1,250 lb (570 kg); the estimated driving range is 50 mi (80 km) and the maximum speed is 60 mph (97 km/h). Testing at EVTC showed the ECRV met or exceeded its performance requirements, including an accelerated 20,000 mi (32,000 km) reliability test. Real-world testing at the Fountain Valley, California, post office during July and August demonstrated the average route covered 13–16 miles (21–26 km), consuming an average of 41% of the battery state of charge. After Ford announced they were also canceling their electric vehicle program in October 2002, the battery manufacturer (East Penn Manufacturing Company) offered to sell replacement traction batteries for the ECRVs to be held in cold storage as experience showed the batteries would need to be replaced after two years of service. The USPS instead traded the ECRVs in August 2003 back to Ford in exchange for Windstar minivans.

A second round of testing five converted all-electric LLVs began in 2011. Each second-generation eLLV was converted by a different group, funded by the USPS through a $50,000 grant to each electromodder, and tested in Washington, D.C. In the nine-month period from March to December 2011, the five vehicles had taken an aggregated 9,181 trips and traveled a total distance of 3,965 miles (6,381 km), consuming an average of 0.645 kW⋅h/mi (52.3 mpg‑e) of AC power (from the wall). By March 2014, only one of the modified eLLVs (from ZAP) remained in service.

Second-generation eLLVs
| Conversion group | LLV No. | Battery | | | Traction motor | Range (Note: Under SAE J1634, Recommended Practice for Battery Electric Vehicle Energy Consumption) | Efficiency | | Ref. |
| Conversion group | LLV No. | Type | Voltage | Capacity | Traction motor | Range | USPS (Note: 25 mi (40 km) route with 1,000 lb (450 kg) payload and 200 lb (91 kg) driver) | J1634 (Note: With 332 lb (151 kg) payload) | Ref. |
|---|---|---|---|---|---|---|---|---|---|
| Autoport / AC Propulsion / University of Delaware | 2204700 | Li-Ion | 375 V | 60 A-hr; 22.5 kW-hr | AC induction | 54.4 mi (87.5 km) | 1.16 kW⋅h/mi (29 mpg‑e) | 0.446 kW⋅h/mi (75.6 mpg‑e) | |
| Bright Automotive | 9216355 | Li-Ion | 345 V | 56.5 A-hr; 19.5 kW-hr | DC brushless | 47.7 mi (76.8 km) | 0.843 kW⋅h/mi (40.0 mpg‑e) | 0.503 kW⋅h/mi (67.0 mpg‑e) | |
| EDAG | 8201107 | Zebra (NaNiCl_{2}) | 371 V | 150 A-hr; 55.7 kW-hr | DC brushless | 106 mi (171 km) | 1.217 kW⋅h/mi (27.7 mpg‑e) | 0.598 kW⋅h/mi (56.4 mpg‑e) | |
| Quantum Technologies | 3300987 | Li-Ion | 333 V | 40 A-hr; 13.3 kW-hr | DC brushless | 36.9 mi (59.4 km) | 1.063 kW⋅h/mi (31.7 mpg‑e) | 0.403 kW⋅h/mi (84 mpg‑e) | |
| ZAP | 8215162 | Li-Ion | 267 V | 80 A-hr; 21.4 kW-hr | 3-phase permanent magnet | 44.1 mi (71.0 km) | 0.939 kW⋅h/mi (35.9 mpg‑e) | 0.507 kW⋅h/mi (66.5 mpg‑e) | |

== Replacements ==
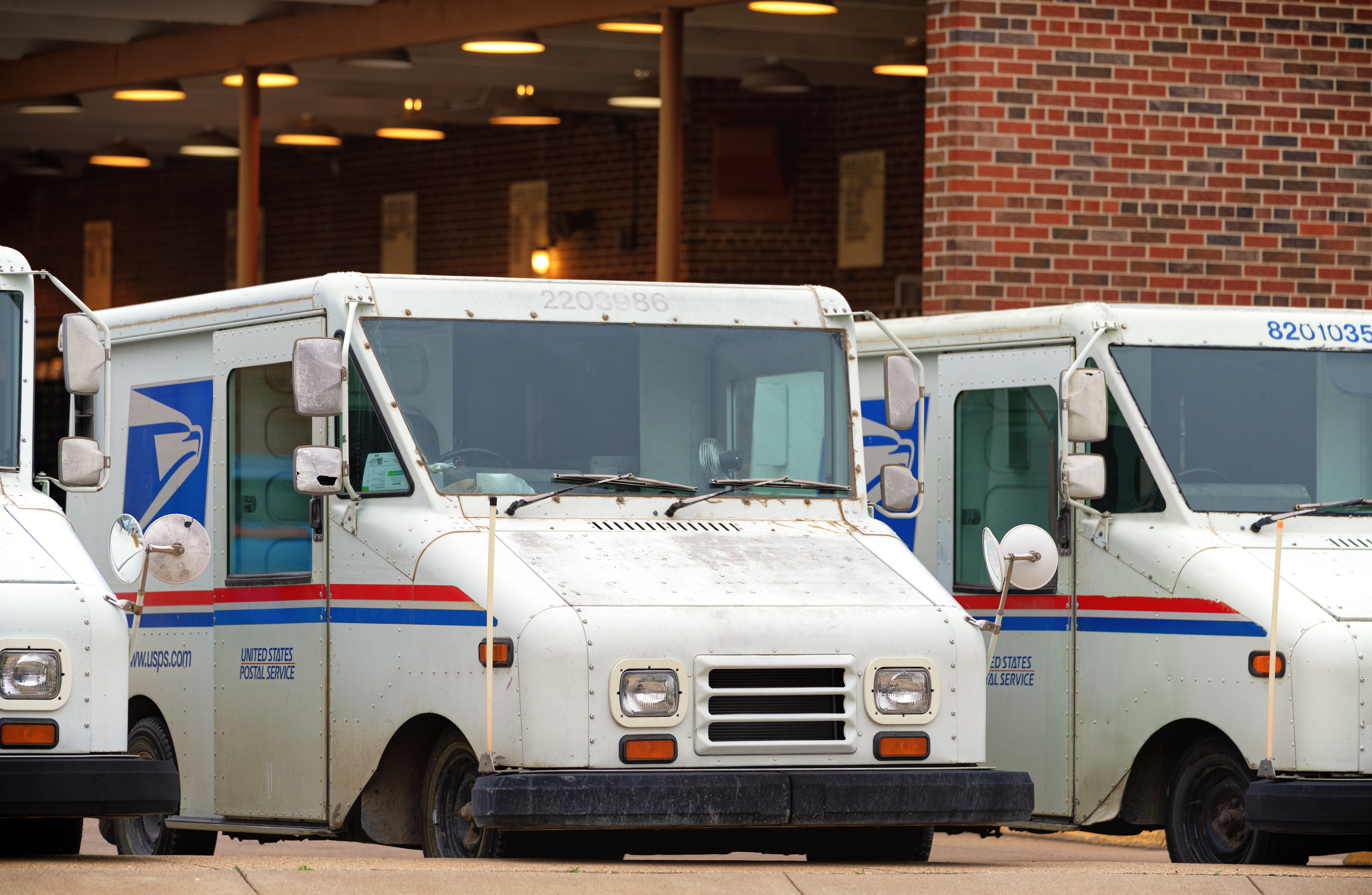
LLVs in Hays, Kansas in 2020. The center vehicle, a 1992 model, was 28 years old when photographed.

Because the United States Postal Service owns more than 100,000 Grumman LLVs, of which most have reached the end of their lifespan, the USPS has been preparing to replace the LLVs. In fiscal year 2009, the USPS spent $524 million to repair and retrofit its fleet of Grumman LLVs, and estimated that it would cost $4.2 billion to replace the entire fleet. By 2021, it was estimated that each LLV required maintenance costing more than $5,000 per year; the all-aluminum body had proven to be robust and corrosion-resistant, but the chassis frame and powertrain components had required reverse-engineering as the original designs were out of production.

The LLVs also suffer from several design deficiencies, including inadequate cabin climate controls (no air conditioning and a heater prone to breaking down). The wheels and suspension are not suited for the all-terrain and all-weather needs of delivering mail and require snow chains during inclement weather. Also, because the windshield washer fluid line is routed above the fusebox, LLVs are prone to catching fire; between 2015 and 2019, over 120 fires occurred. According to documents obtained in 2020 via a Freedom of Information Act request as part of a Vice Media investigation, 407 LLVs have been damaged or destroyed since May 2014.

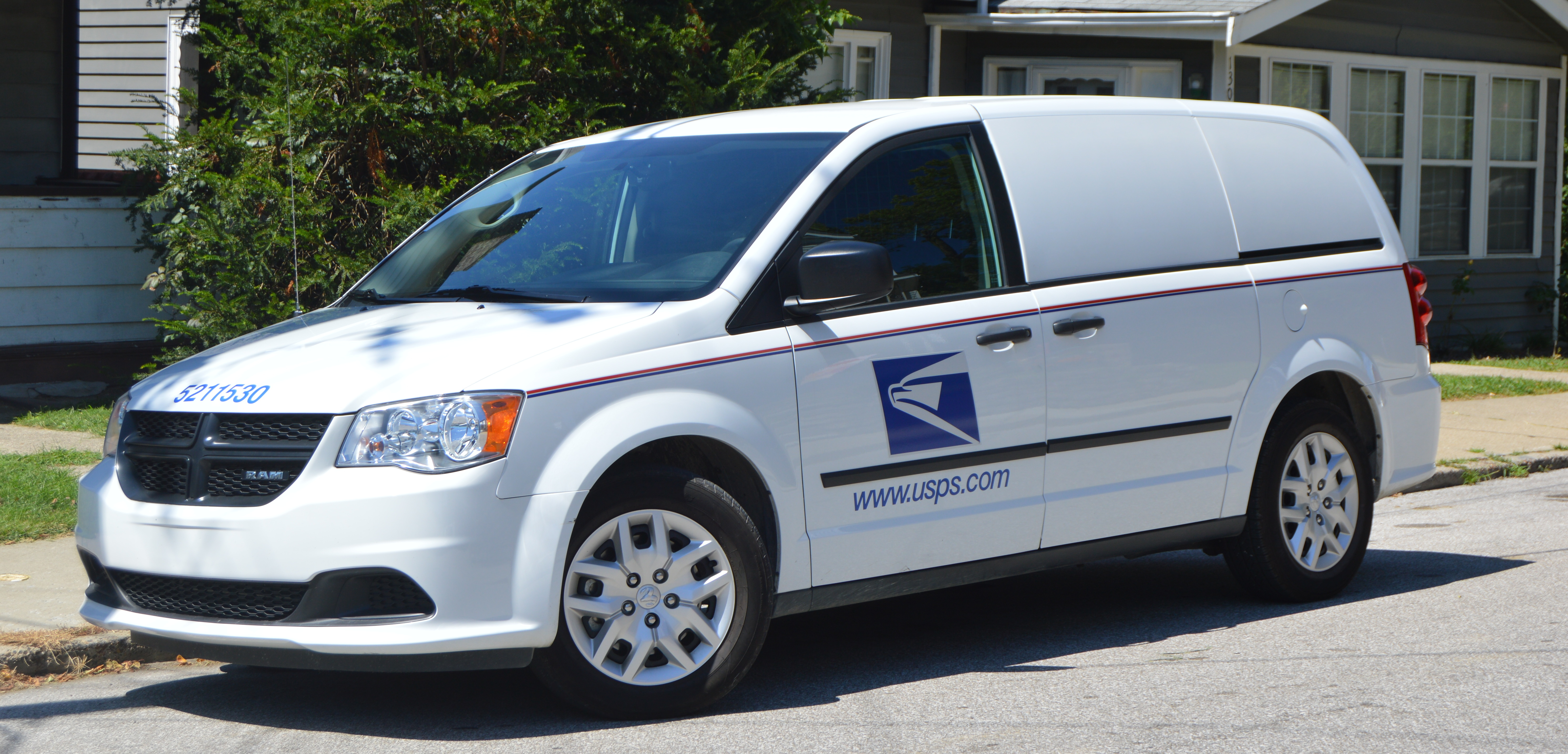
USPS-operated minivan (Dodge Caravan Cargo) serving in the LLV's role

In some areas, LLVs have been supplemented or replaced with vans and minivans, including the 2008–2010 purchase of Dodge Grand Caravan and Chevrolet Uplander minivans, which tend to be more comfortable for postal workers, especially in extreme climates. The United States Postal Service has announced it would purchase 7,160 Ram ProMaster (to replace Caravan and Uplander vehicles) and up to 30,608 right-hand-drive Mercedes-Benz Metris vehicles as part of the Commercial-Off-The-Shelf (COTS) vehicle program announced on August 3, 2018, to replace and upgrade its fleet of delivery vehicles.

In 2014, the USPS reviewed options for replacement. The Office of Inspector General found that the Postal Service's acquisition plan for replacements lacked details and while the USPS could continue deliveries until 2017, there were concerns over the aging vehicles.

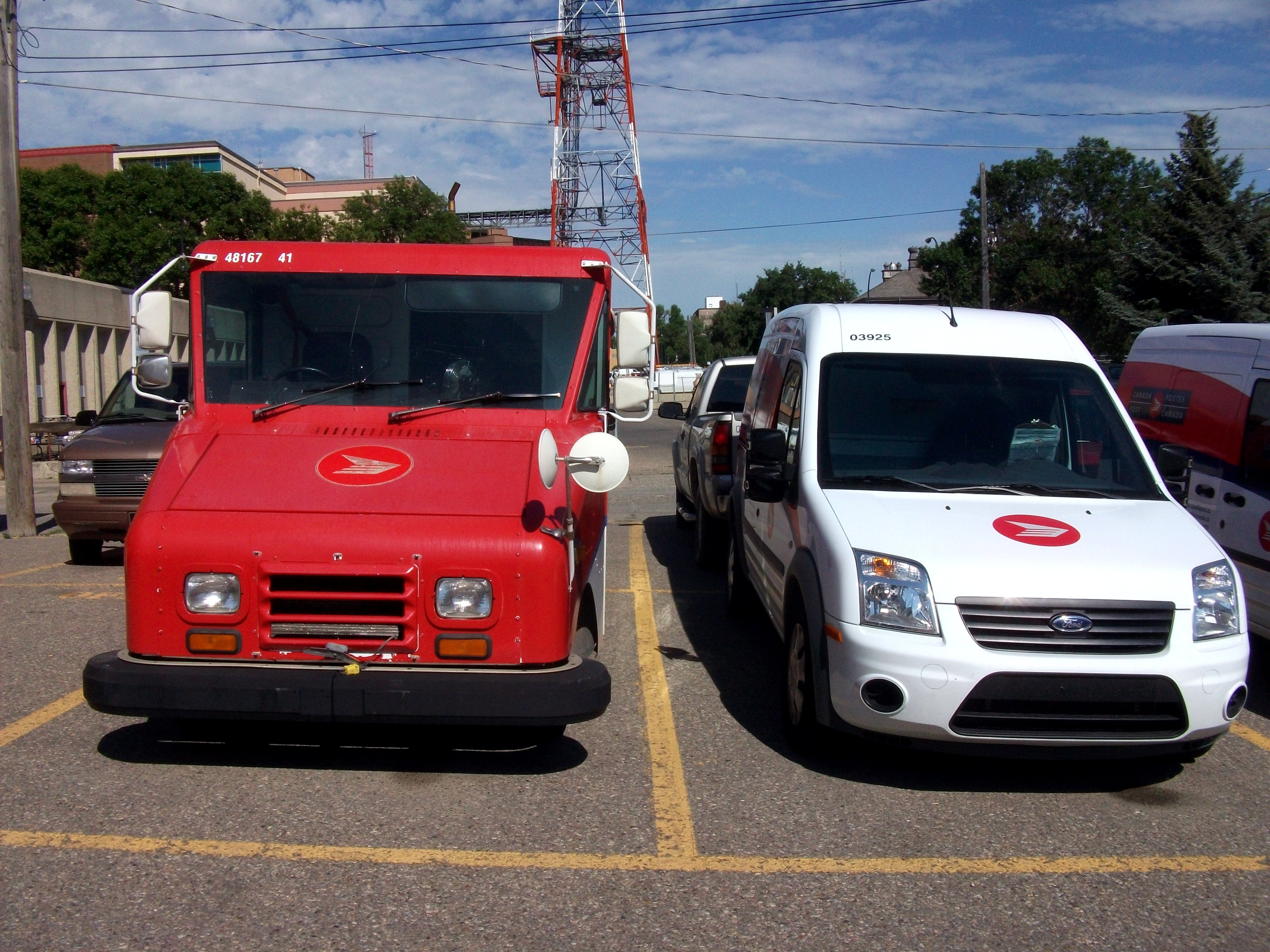
Canada Post began replacing its LLV fleet in the early 2010s

Canada Post also adopted the Grumman LLV, but around 2008, it began studying whether to refurbish, upgrade, or replace its fleet. On March 18, 2010, Canada Post and the Ford Motor Company announced that Canada Post would purchase a fleet of Transit Connect vans.

=== Next Generation Delivery Vehicle ===
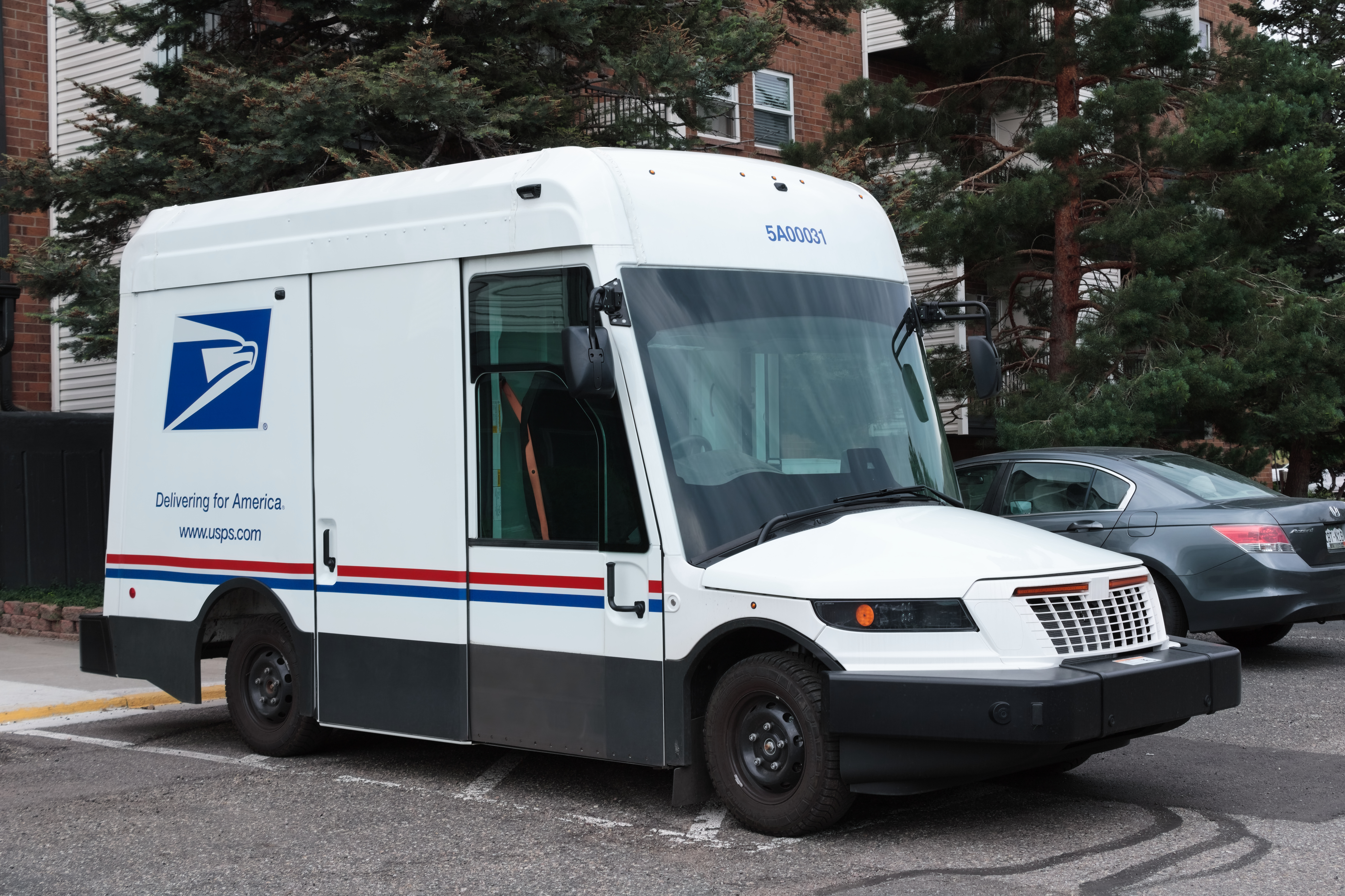
NGDV in Golden, Colorado in 2025

On January 20, 2015, the USPS released solicitation RFI-NGDV for the Next Generation Delivery Vehicle. Potential bidders had until March 5, 2015, to submit comments and pre-qualification responses. The USPS was to then select companies to receive the RFP for prototype development. On February 13, 2015, it was announced that General Motors was actively pursuing this new contract, which would have them provide the USPS with 180,000 new vehicles at a cost of at least $5 billion. On September 22, 2016, the United States Postal Service awarded the NGDV Prototype Contract to six selected suppliers: AM General, Karsan, Mahindra, Oshkosh, Utilimaster, and a joint-venture bid involving Workhorse and VT Hackney. Half of the prototypes would feature hybrid and new technologies, including alternative fuel capabilities. The prototypes would represent a variety of vehicle sizes and drive configurations, in addition to advanced power trains and a range of hybrid technologies.

On February 23, 2021, the USPS announced that Oshkosh Defense was awarded the contract for design and manufacture of the Next Generation Delivery Vehicle (NGDV) to replace the LLV and FFV, delivering up to 165,000 vehicles over a ten-year period.
