= KurbWatt =

Grumman KurbWatt

Overview
- Manufacturer: Grumman
- Production: 1980–1983

Body and chassis
- Class: Mail truck
- Related: Grumman LLV

Powertrain
- Electric motor: Electric engine
- Battery: 14 6-volt lead-acid batteries
- Electric range: 40 miles (64 km)

Dimensions
- Wheelbase: 99 in (2,515 mm)
- Length: 144 in (3,658 mm)
- Height: 71 in (1,803 mm)
- Curb weight: 2,650 lb (1,202 kg)

The Grumman KurbWatt was an all aluminum electric powered concept mail truck.

== History ==
The KurbWatt was designed to replace the Jeep DJ in response to the 1979 oil crisis in an effort to consume less fuel. They were expected to save the United States Postal Service 500,000 gallons of fuel a year.

The KurbWatt was determined to be too small, and because of this never entered mass production.

Approximately 50 KurbWatts were manufactured in total. 40 put into service, and remained in service for about 10 years. 10 were sold to private parties.

The KurbWatt was removed from USPS service in 1992 due to high battery prices and the energy crisis ending.
