= Isuzu Reach =

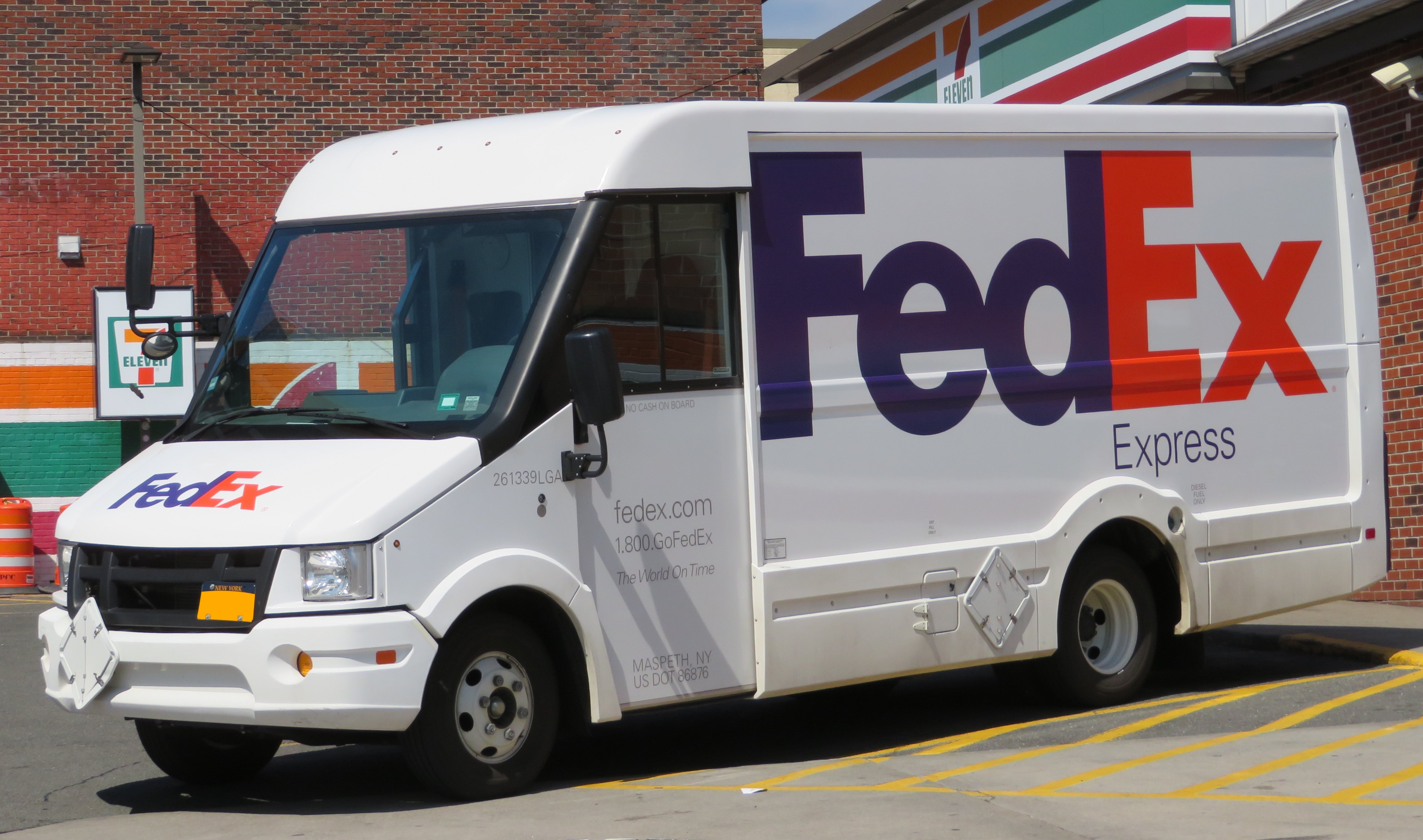

Overview
- Manufacturer: Isuzu
- Production: 2011–2019
- Assembly: United States: Bristol, Indiana

Body and chassis
- Class: Medium duty truck
- Body style: Walk-through van

Powertrain
- Engine: 2999 cc 4JJ1-TC turbodiesel I4
- Transmission: 6-speed Aisin automatic

Dimensions
- Wheelbase: 151 in (3,835 mm)

The Isuzu Reach is a walk-through van built atop an Isuzu NPR chassis, with a body developed by Utilimaster. It was first presented in March 2011 at the National Truck Equipment Association's "Work Truck Show". The van was only sold in North America, where it is also assembled. It was designed to be more fuel efficient and to emit less carbon dioxide than regular trucks, by being more aerodynamic and of lightweight construction, which also allowed for a smaller engine to be used.

== Design ==
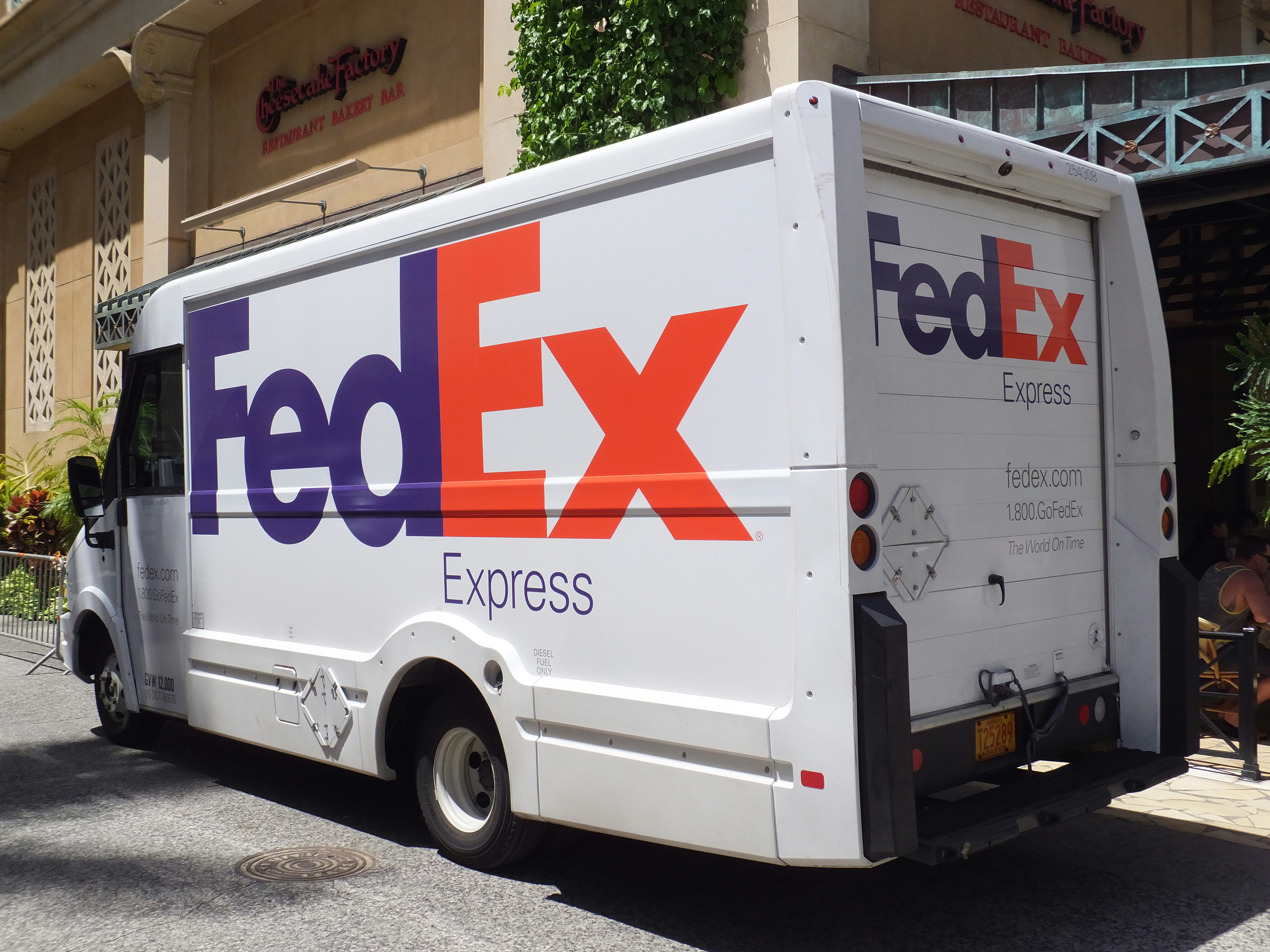
Isuzu Reach rear

The Reach used the Isuzu NPR's ladder chassis and also the three-litre 4JJ1-TC diesel engine as used in the NPR Eco-Max. The body is a full walk-through design developed by Utilimaster, and offered the buyer the choice of swing-out rear doors or a roll-up unit. Both UPS and FedEx used the Reach for city delivery work. Two lengths were available on a single wheelbase, offering cargo volumes of either 540 or 630 cu ft (15.3 or 17.8 m^{3}).

Aftermarket power-train company XL Hybrids announced a hybrid-electric version of the Reach in March 2015 for the Work Truck Show in Indianapolis, using their XL3 Hybrid Electric Drive System.
