= The Shyft Group =

American automobile design company

The Shyft Group, Inc.
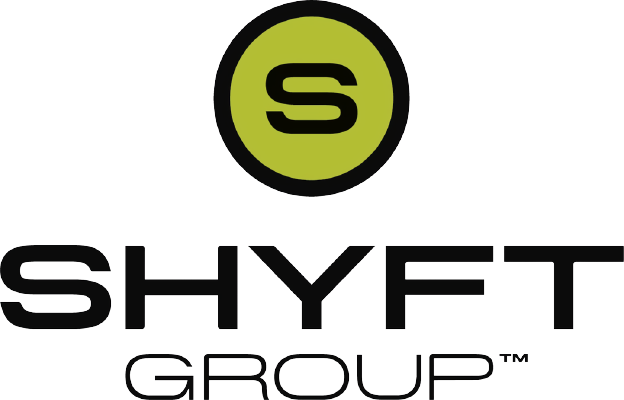
- Formerly: Spartan Motors
- Type: Public
- Traded as: Nasdaq: SHYF; Russell 2000 Component
- Industry: Automotive
- Founded: September 18, 1975; 51 years ago
- Founders: Charles McManamey; George Sztykiel
- Headquarters: Novi, Michigan, U.S.
- Key people: John Dunn (president & CEO); Jonathan Douyard (CFO)
- Revenue: ▲US$786.2 million (2024)
- Operating income: ▲US$48.85 million (2020)
- Net income: ▲US$48.2 million (2020)
- Total assets: ▼US$359.05 million (2020)
- Total equity: ▲US$200.33 million (2020)
- Number of employees: 3,000 (2021)
- Website: theshyftgroup.com

The Shyft Group is an American automobile design company that designs, engineers and manufactures specialty chassis, specialty vehicles, truck bodies and aftermarket parts for the recreational vehicle (RV), government services, and delivery and service markets.

Started in 1975 as a direct result of the bankruptcy of Diamond Reo, the firm has 3,000 employees and is currently headquartered in Novi, Michigan and has 3,000 employees. From its founding until 2020, it was known as Spartan Motors.

== History ==
In 1974, Lansing-based Diamond Reo Trucks filed for bankruptcy. The Form-Rite Corporation of Charlotte, Michigan was owed a significant sum by Diamond Reo, which had been Form-Rite's largest client; Form-Rite had supplied fiberglass parts to Reo.

During the bankruptcy hearings, Form-Rite president Charles R. McManamey learned of a significant contract that Reo had just won for custom fire truck chassis. From connections made through the hearing, McManamey was able to draw together the additional talent and knowledge required to build such trucks, and founded Spartan Motors, Inc. as a wholly owned subsidiary of Form-Rite.

During the establishment of Spartan, manufacturing was set up in Form-Rite's 12,000 ft^{2} (1,100 m^{2}) warehouse in Charlotte; McManamey was named chairman of its board. Kenneth McManamey, former Form-Rite production engineer and supervisor, served as Spartan's manager of operations.

While former Reo vice president of engineering and marketing George Sztykiel became president of the new company, former Reo Reo manager of original equipment manufacturing Ron Partee assumed the role of vice president of sales. In turn, former Reo director of engineering John Knox was vice president of engineering at the new firm.

Sztykiel, Partee, Knox, and Ken McManamey all donated their time to build the first chassis on speculation. By January 1, 1976, the chassis was completed. Within weeks it had been sold to FMC in Tipton, Indiana and Spartan had 16 custom fire truck cab & chassis orders as well as an order for a one-of-a-kind 140,000 pound GVW coal carrier.

In March 1976, Spartan Motors employed 12 former Reo employees, including Reo's ex–quality control manager Theodore C. Huff, former staff engineer-chassis at Reo Lawrence E. Karkau, and Gerald L. Geary, who had been assistant manager of truck design at Reo. Spartan was spun-off with its own officers and directors that April. Charles McManamey's sons James and Donald also worked for Spartan Motors, as well as several other part-time workers.

The company quickly outgrew the Form-Rite warehouse, and within a few years construction was started for a new facility on Reynolds Road in Charlotte. The McManameys sold their stock in the company and in 1984 Spartan went public, trading on NASDAQ under the symbol “SPAR”.

Spartan Motors entered the United Kingdom transit bus market in 1995 with the unveiling of its Spartan TX low-floor single-deck bus chassis at Coach & Bus 95, held at the National Exhibition Centre in Birmingham, England. The Spartan TX, built with an Alusuisse-framed East Lancs Opus 2 body seating 53 passengers to a budget of £82,000 (1995) (equivalent to £160,818.34 or US$205,541.08 in 2024), was designed to be durable while saving manufacturing costs, and was fitted with a rear-mounted Cummins B Series engine, an Allison transmission and an Eaton air suspension. Only two Spartan TX buses were produced, with both being delivered to Barnsley-based Yorkshire Traction by 1996.

In June 2020, Spartan Motors announced its corporate name change to The Shyft Group, Inc. following the divestiture of its Emergency Response (ER) business unit; it began trading on NASDAQ under the symbol "SHYF". In October, Shyft acquired the aluminum truck-body manufacturer F3 MFG Inc. based in Waterville, Maine, with its brands DuraMag and Magnum.

In July 2025, it was announced that the company merged its operations with those of Aebi Schmidt, creating a new entity called the Aebi Schmidt Group.

== Active subsidiaries ==
=== Spartan RV Chassis ===
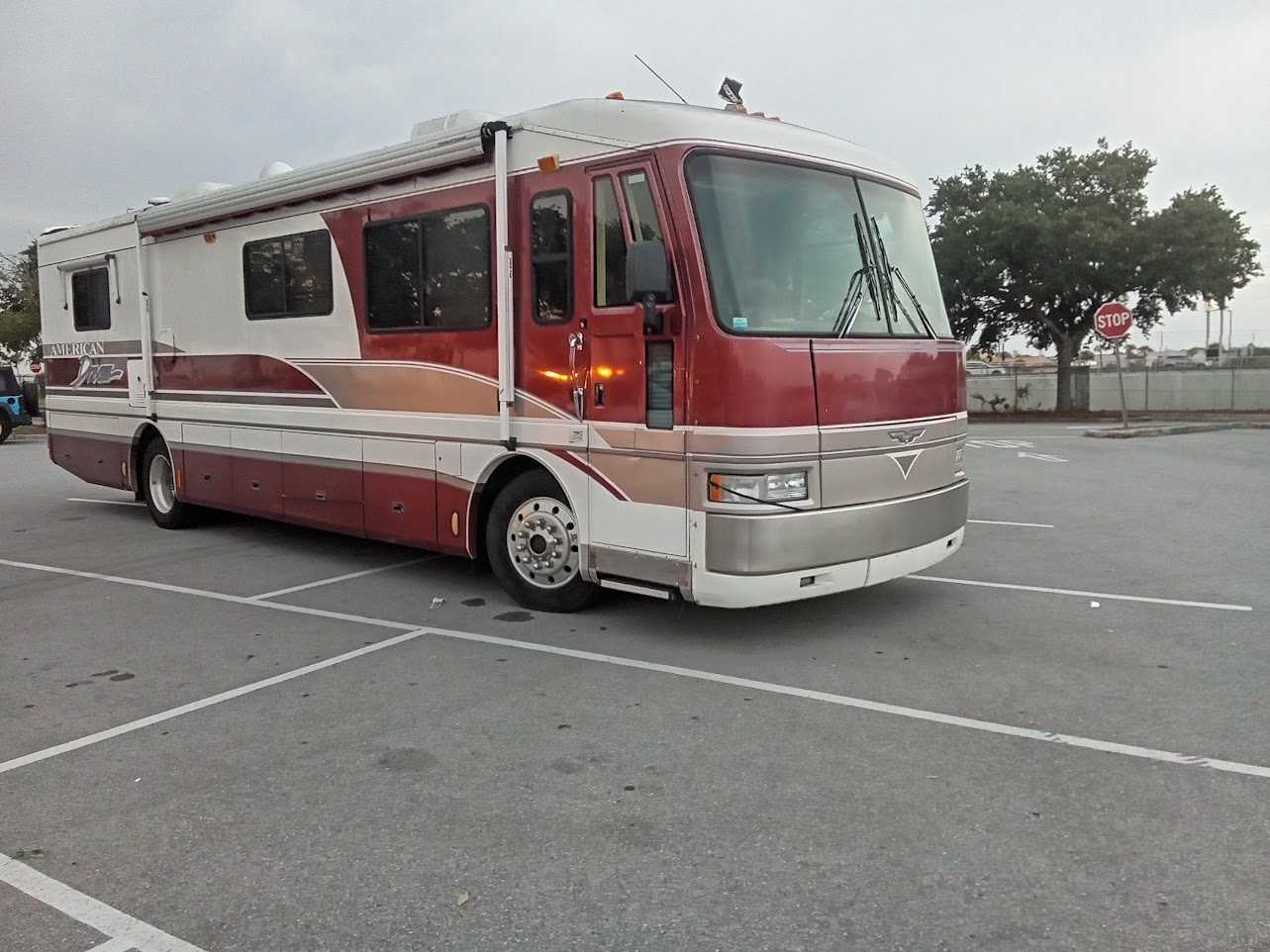
A Spartan American Dream motorhome spotted at a Wal-Mart in Spring Hill, Florida.

Spartan RV Chassis engineers, designs, manufactures, sells, and services Class A diesel RV chassis for OEMs such as Entegra Coach, Newmar, Foretravel, and Jayco.

=== Utilimaster ===
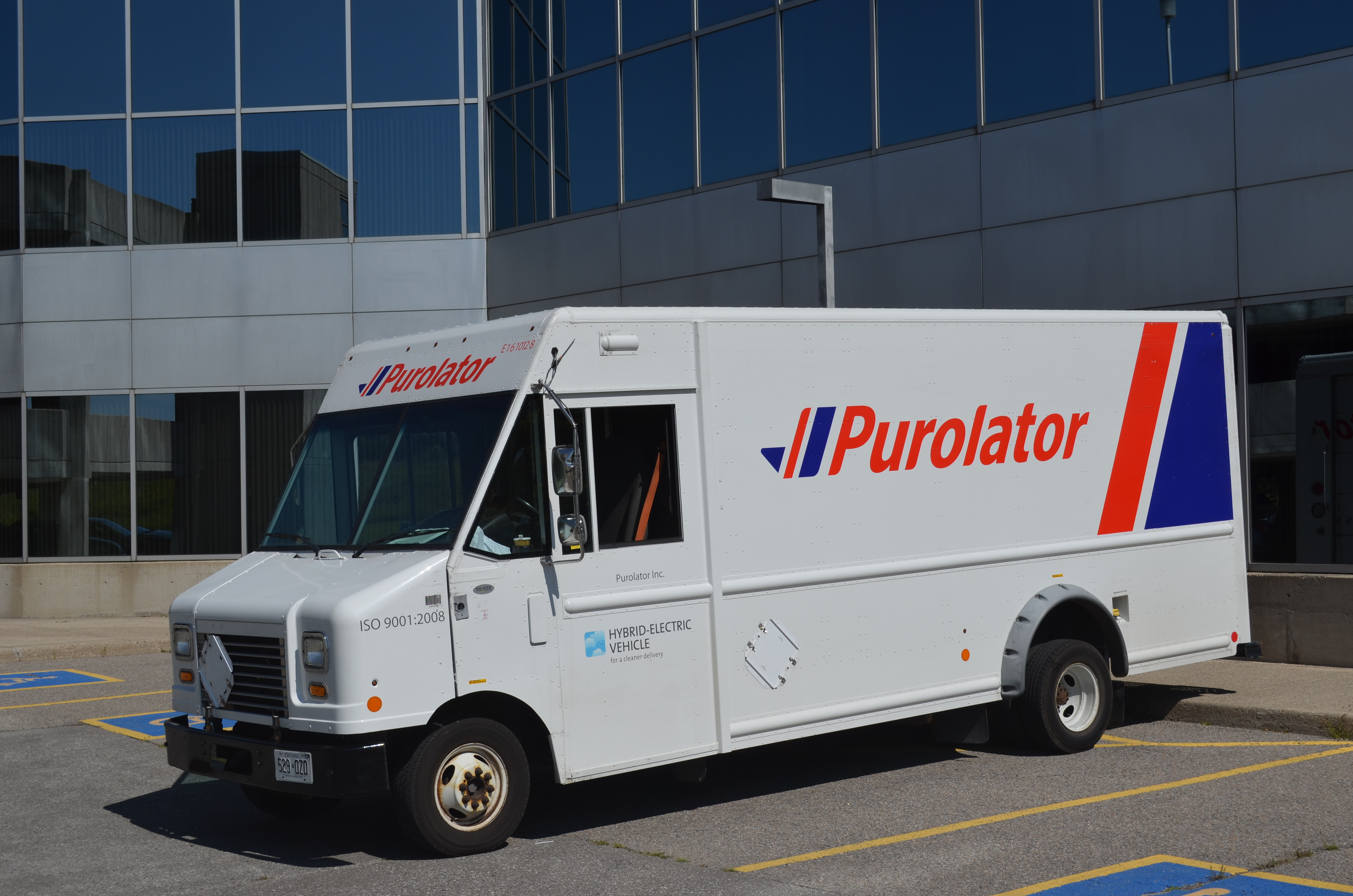
Utilimaster delivery van

Utilimaster was acquired in November 2009. It designs, manufacturers, and assembles purpose-built delivery and other vocational trucks.

=== Strobes-R-Us ===
Strobes-R-Us was acquired on December 17, 2018. It is a distributor and installer of specialty vehicle upfits and lighting equipment.

=== General Truck Body ===
General Truck Body was acquired in June 2019 and merged with Utilimaster. It manufactures and assembles refrigerated and non-refrigerated truck bodies.

=== Royal Truck Body ===
Royal Truck Body was acquired on September 20, 2019. It manufactures van bodies and accessories.

=== DuraMag and Magnum ===
On October 1, 2020, Shyft acquired F3 MFG, an aluminum truck body and accessory manufacturer behind the DuraMag Body and Magnum Truck Rack brands. The F3 MFG name was phased out and the DuraMag and Magnum brands were nested under the Shyft Specialty Vehicles business unit.

=== Blue Arc ===
Shyft launched Blue Arc EV Solutions in March 2022 to build commercial battery electric delivery vans. The Randy Marion Automotive Group placed a pre-order for the vans that September, at about the same time the first prototypes were shown to the press; they are offered in lengths of 12 to 22 ft (3.7 to 6.7 m) and multiple gross vehicle weight ratings, ranging from Class 3 to 5.

== Former subsidiaries ==
=== Spartan Emergency Response Vehicles ===
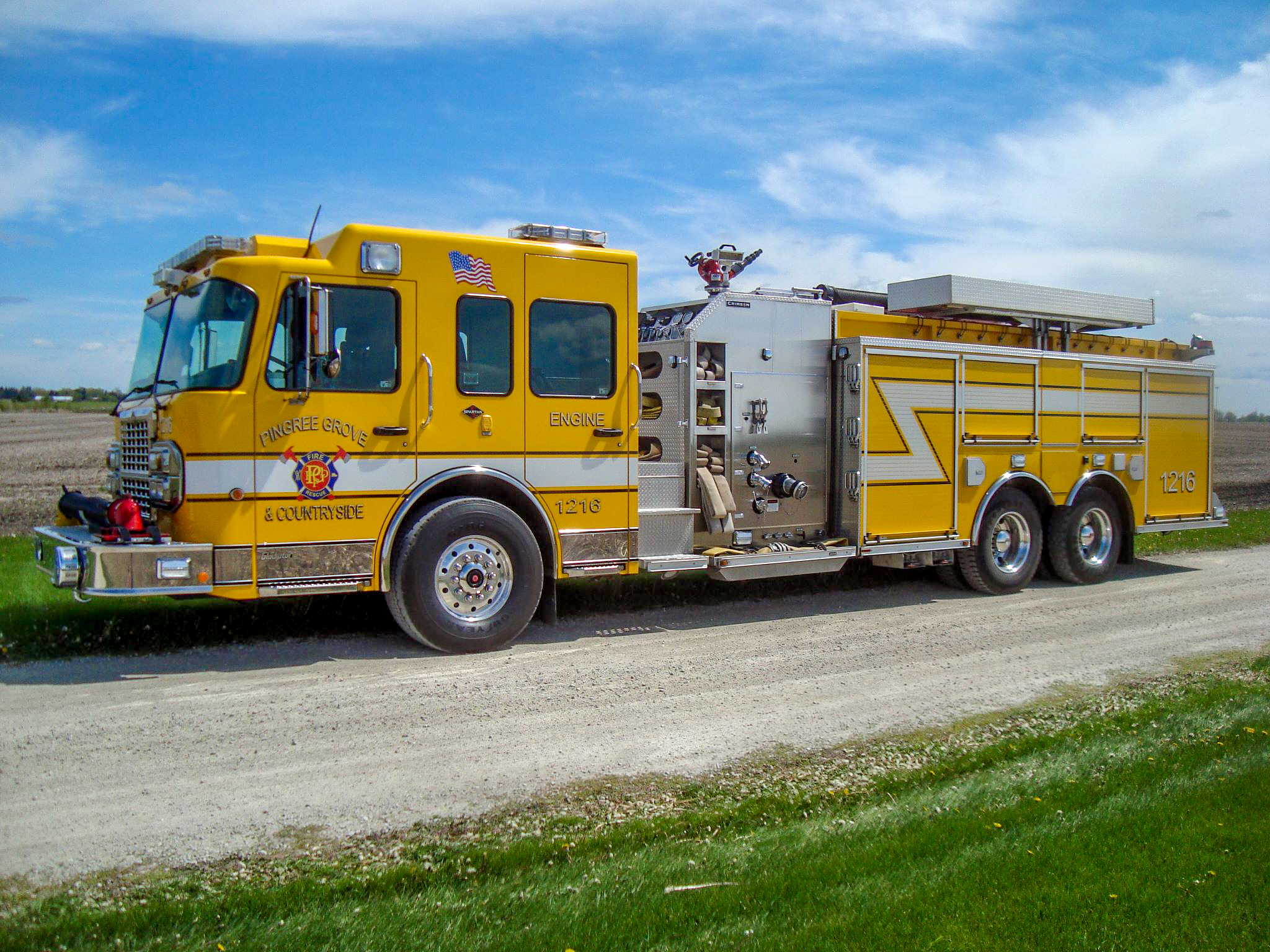
Fire truck for Pingree Grove, Illinois, built on a Spartan Gladiator chassis

Spartan Emergency Response Vehicles (Spartan ERV) is a manufacturer of custom fire engines. After several years of supplying chassis for fire trucks, Spartan acquired fire apparatus body manufacturers Luverne and Quality Manufacturing in the mid-1990s. Luverne used its early expertise in the automotive and heavy truck industries to begin building fire apparatus in 1912. Quality got its start six decades later, catering to the Southern firefighting market. In 2003, Luverne and Quality were consolidated under the names Crimson Fire and Crimson Fire Aerials. In 2011, Classic Fire of Ocala, Florida was acquired and became a new Crimson Fire manufacturing facility for fire trucks. In 2012, Spartan Motors rebranded Crimson Fire as Spartan ERV, a joint venture with Gimaex. In January 2017, Spartan ERV acquired fire apparatus manufacturer Smeal Fire Apparatus, including its subsidiaries Smeal, Ladder Tower Company, and US Tanker. On February 3, 2020, Spartan Motors sold Spartan ERV division to the REV Group, including Spartan Custom Cabs, Smeal Fire Apparatus, Ladder Tower Company, and US Tanker.

=== Road Rescue ===
Road Rescue is a manufacturer of ambulances. It was sold in 2010 to Allied Specialty Vehicles.

=== Carpenter Industries ===
Carpenter Industries was a manufacturer of school buses, transit buses, and step vans. Carpenter was founded in 1919; Spartan purchased it in 1998, but closed it down in 2001.
