= Jeep DJ =

Truck model

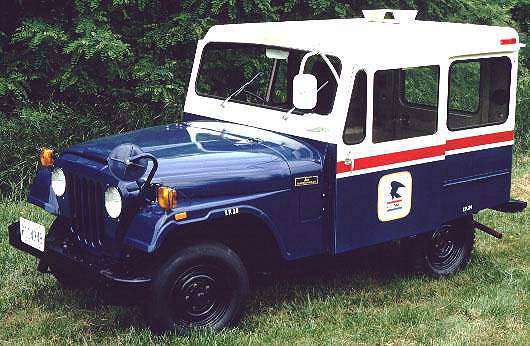
- A 1975 Jeep DJ-5D in United States Postal Service livery, pictured in 2007

Overview
- Manufacturer: Willys Motors (1955–1963); Kaiser Jeep (1963–1970); American Motors Corporation (1970–1971); AM General (1971–1984)
- Also called: Mail Jeep
- Production: 1955–1984
- Assembly: United States: Toledo, Ohio (Toledo Complex); United States: Mishawaka, Indiana (AM General)

Body and chassis
- Class: Truck
- Body style: Three-door commercial vehicle
- Layout: FR layout
- Platform: Jeep CJ
- Related: Jeep CJ

Powertrain
- Engine: Various
- Transmission: Various manual and automatic

Dimensions
- Wheelbase: 80 in (2,032 mm) (Most)
- Curb weight: 3,400 lb (1,542 kg)

Chronology
- Successor: Grumman LLV, Wrangler Unlimited, KurbWatt

The Jeep DJ (also known as the Dispatcher) is a two-wheel drive variant of the four-wheel drive CJ series. Production started in 1955 by Willys, which was renamed Kaiser Jeep in 1963. In 1970, American Motors Corporation (AMC) purchased Kaiser's money-losing Jeep operations and established AM General, a wholly owned subsidiary that built the DJ through 1984.

== DJ-3A ==
The DJ-3A was introduced in 1955 for the 1956 model year. It was inexpensive because it used Jeep's existing tooling and technology. At the time, it was the lowest-priced production car offered in the United States, with a 1956 base price of US$1,284 (equivalent to $15,200 in 2025). It used the body style of the older CJ-3A, along with the L-134 engine. Unlike the CJ-3A, it came with either a steering column or a floor-mounted shifter for the three-speed Borg-Warner T-96 manual transmission.

The vehicle was offered with many different body options, including a soft top, metal top, and a full van body with sliding doors. The marketing focused on it being "perfect for economical deliveries" and "for carefree business and pleasure transportation." One model was a postal delivery vehicle with the driver's position on the right side for roadside mailbox delivery.

In early 1959, Willys introduced the Jeep Gala to the export markets and users desiring the nimble size and open bodywork, but not needing a four-wheel drive system. This model gained popularity as a "fun car" at resorts in Hawaii, Mexico, and islands in the Caribbean. It was available in pink, green, or blue paint and trimmed with a striped fabric top in white and colors that matched the body, as well as a decorative white fringe.

In fall 1959, a similar model called the Jeep Surrey was introduced in the US market. The primary target markets were resort hotels and vacation centers. It also served as a low-cost rental vehicle for their guests. The Surrey came with a standard striped fabric top, as well as a matching fabric cover for what was advertised as a "Continental tire mount."

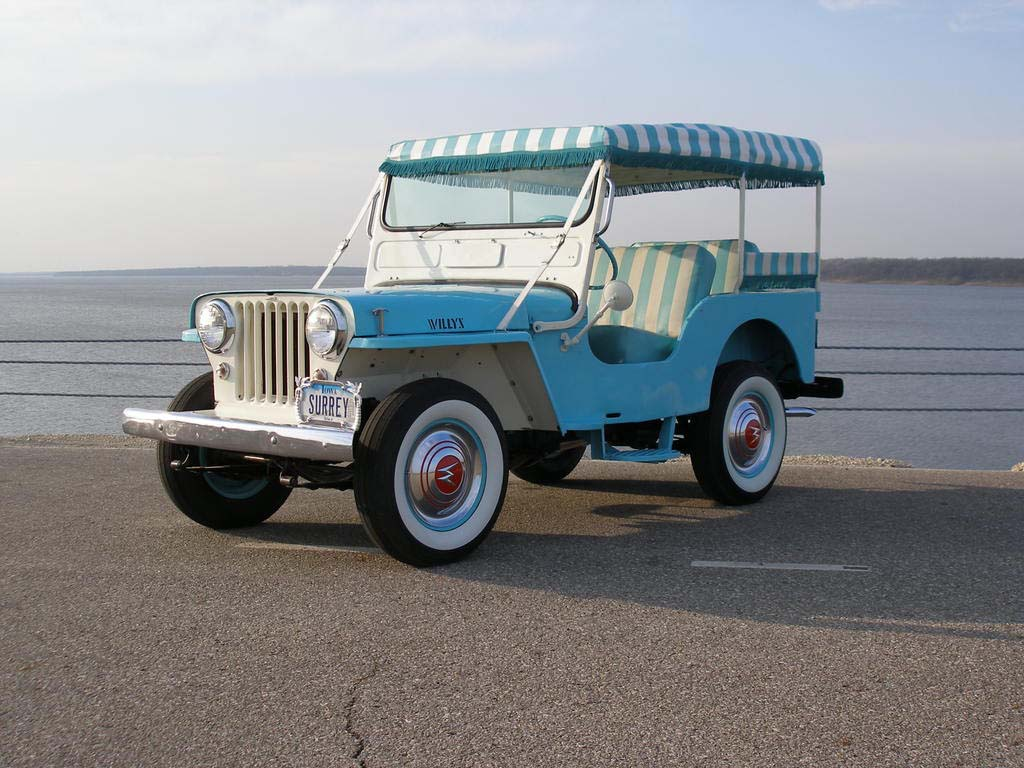
1964 DJ-3A Surrey

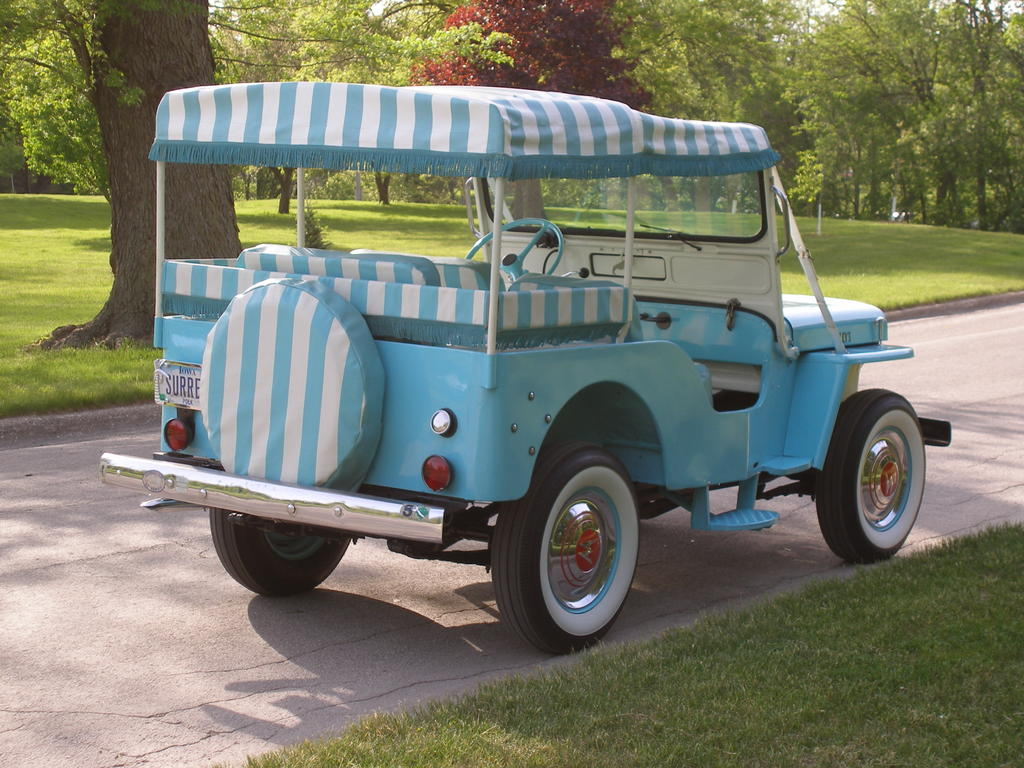
1964 DJ-3A Surrey

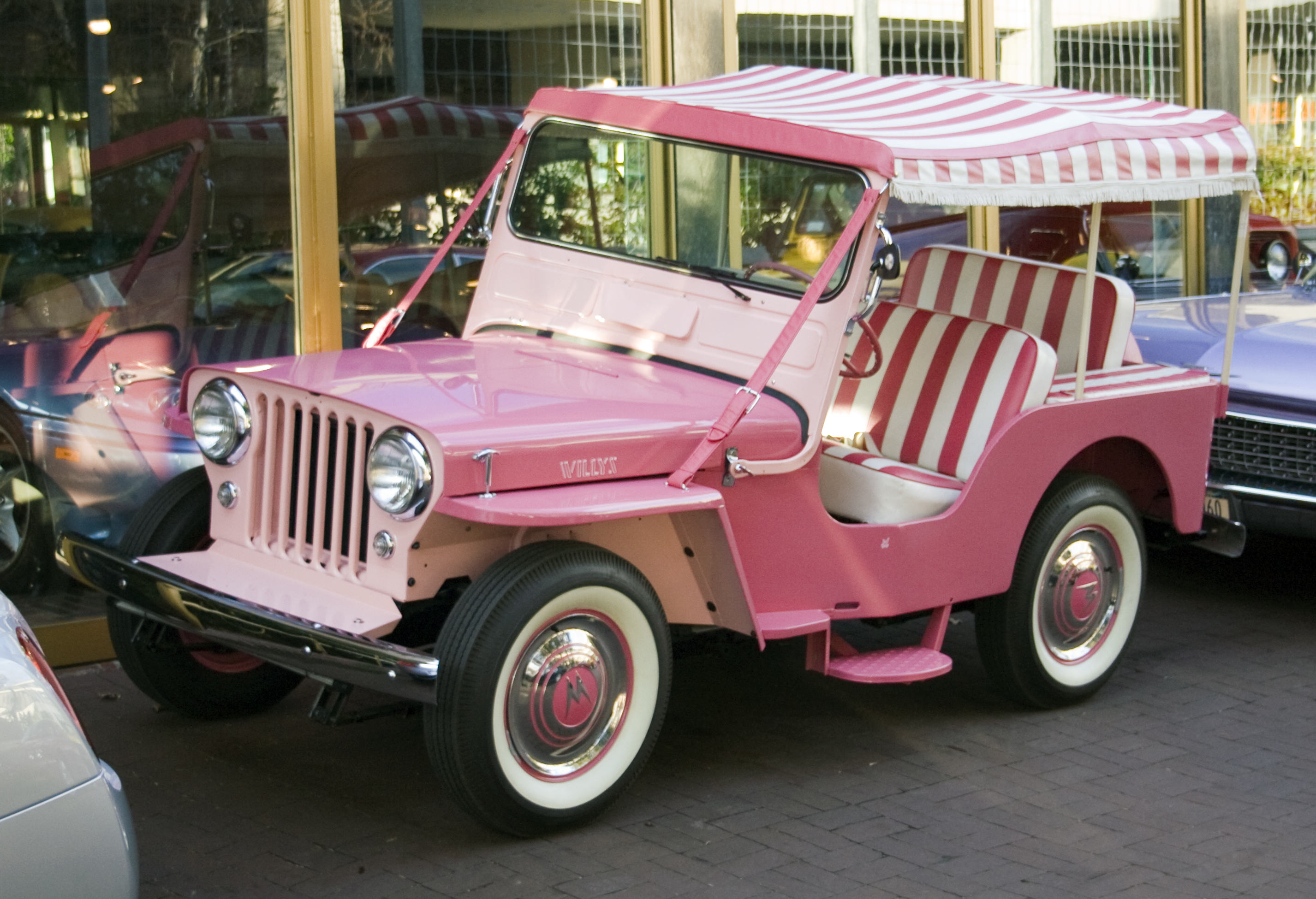
1964 DJ-3A Surrey

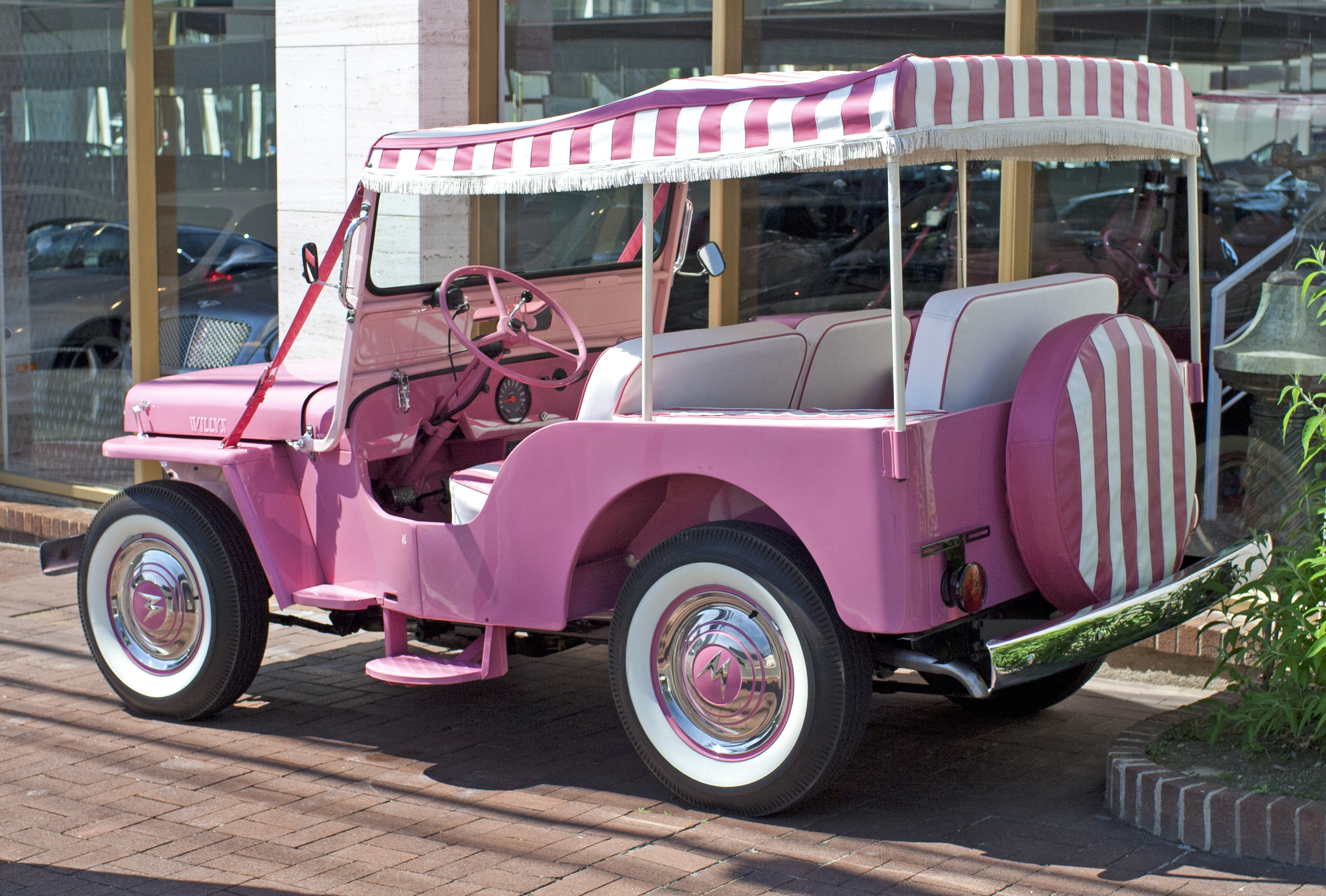
1964 DJ-3A Surrey

== DJ-5 and DJ-6 ==
The DJ-3A was replaced by the right hand drive DJ-5 Dispatcher 100 in 1965. It was based on the CJ-5 and used the Hurricane and Dauntless engines. A 20-inch (508 mm) longer wheelbase DJ-6 model was built from 1965 through 1973 alongside the CJ-6.

== DJ-5A through DJ-5M ==
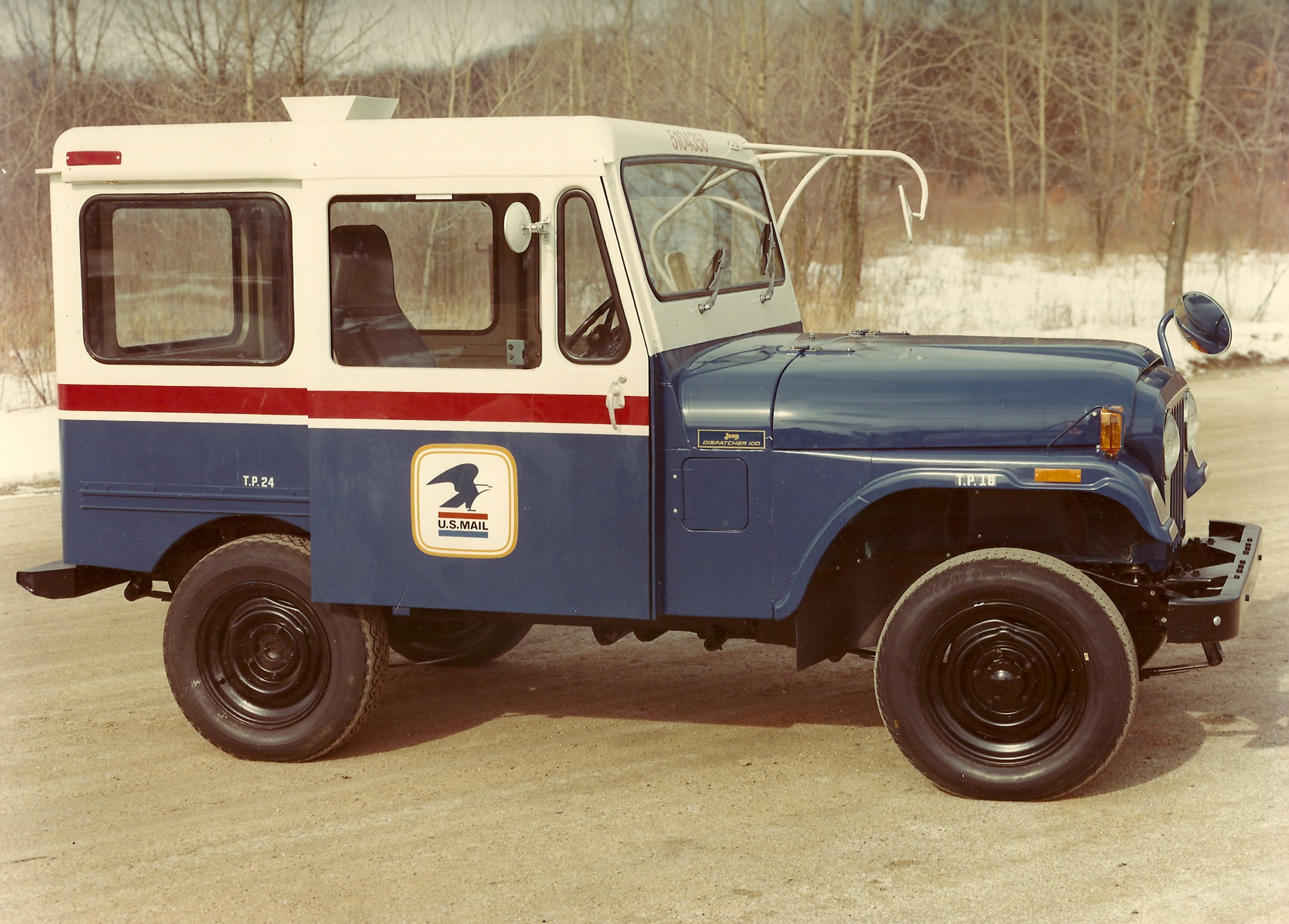
Jeep DJ-5 in the red, white, and blue livery used from 1954 until 1979

The United States Postal Service used 1953 Willys Jeeps, Cushman Mailmasters, and sit-stand trucks to motorize more than half of the suburban residential routes by 1969. The Postal Service held a competition in 1968 to select a light delivery vehicle, evaluating the Ford Bronco, International Scout, and the Jeep Dispatcher 100 (DJ-5). The USPS selected the Jeep Dispatcher. The first units were delivered in the northern U.S., replacing the three-wheeled Mailsters that were too small and weak to maneuver through winter's snow and ice. The Jeeps became widely used by the USPS during the 1970s and 1980s.

The DJ-5 models built for the United States Post Office were rudimentary vehicles for mail carrier needs with an automatic transmission, an enclosed metal cabin with sliding doors, a sorting table that carriers used to help process mail along the route, and a right-hand drive for quickly reaching mailboxes without leaving the vehicle's seat.

The right-hand drive Postal Service DJs came without power steering and were built with a lighter, less durable design than the standard Jeep. These changes included the use of C-channel frame rails (as opposed to the box rails of the CJ-5), and while the hood was the exact dimensions as (and interchangeable with) the CJ, it did not have the reinforced design of the original. The standard configuration had only a driver's seat and a letter tray installed. This decreased curb weight, combined with different leaf springs than other models, allowed carrying more cargo weight behind the driver.

The metal side doors were designed to slide open and closed. They could also be locked open while driving. They were supported by ball bearings, which ran in a channel just under the rain gutter, and a plastic retainer ran in a small channel along the body. A worn, damaged, or lost retainer would allow the door to swing outward, fail to engage the rubber stop on the rear bumper, and slide entirely off the channel (and the vehicle). A single, hinged rear door gave access to the cargo area from the floor to the bottom of the hard top, and the door was the width of the open area between the wheel wells.

AM General used a variety of engines during production. Production of the DJ ended in 1984 with the DJ-5M, which used the 150 cu in (2.5 L) AMC straight-4 engine.

With the DJ serving many decades, the Postal Service developed a list of the characteristics of an ideal postal delivery rather than selecting an existing vehicle. Three finalists in 1985 were American Motors, a joint venture between Fruehauf and General Automotive Corporation, and a joint venture between General Motors and Grumman. The GM-Grumman LLV or Long Life Vehicle was selected. Nevertheless, after being retired by the Postal Service, there were DJs remaining in daily use delivering mail through 2012, as privately owned vehicles of Postal Service employees.

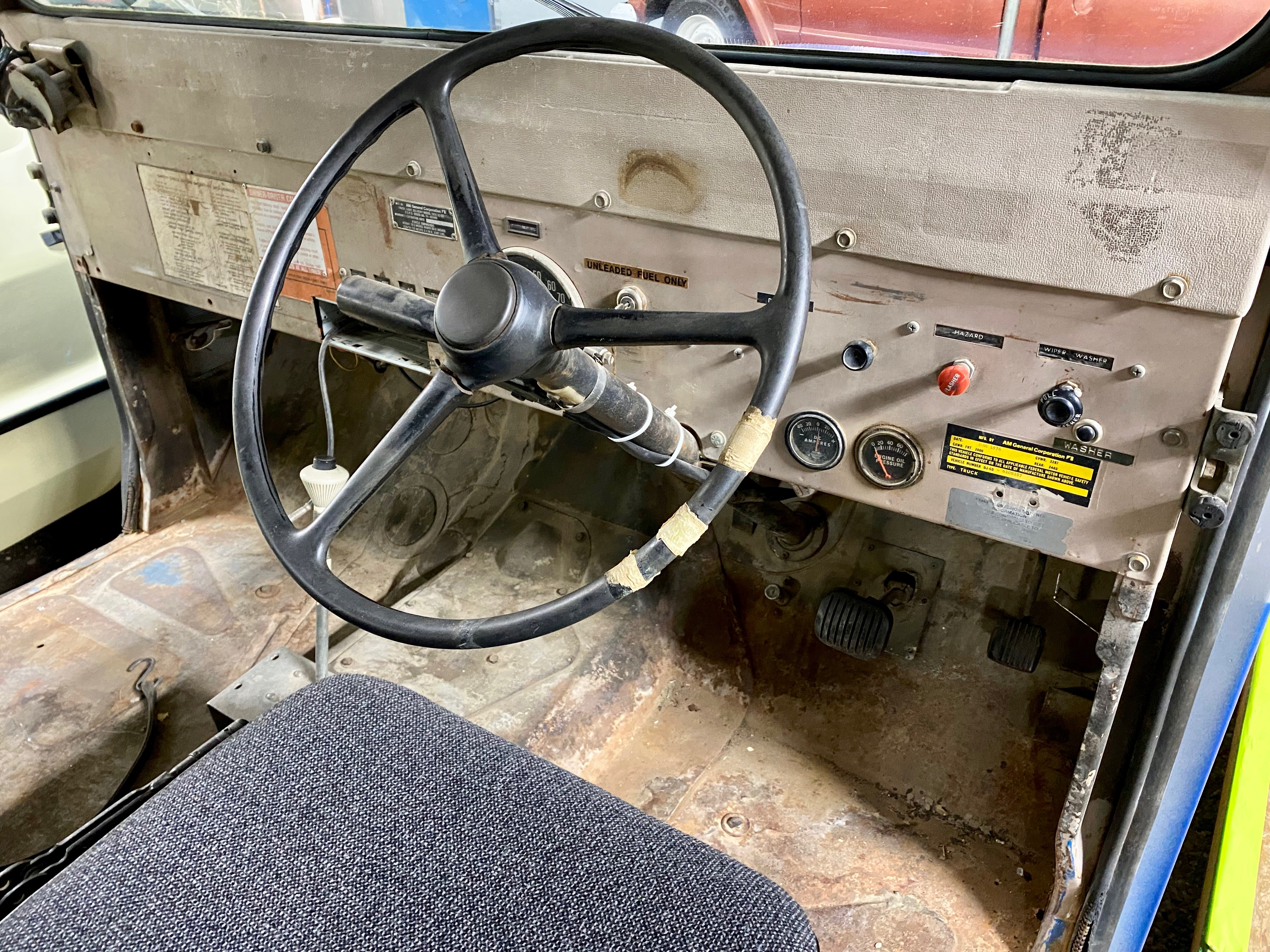
Dashboard and interior of 1976 DJ-5D

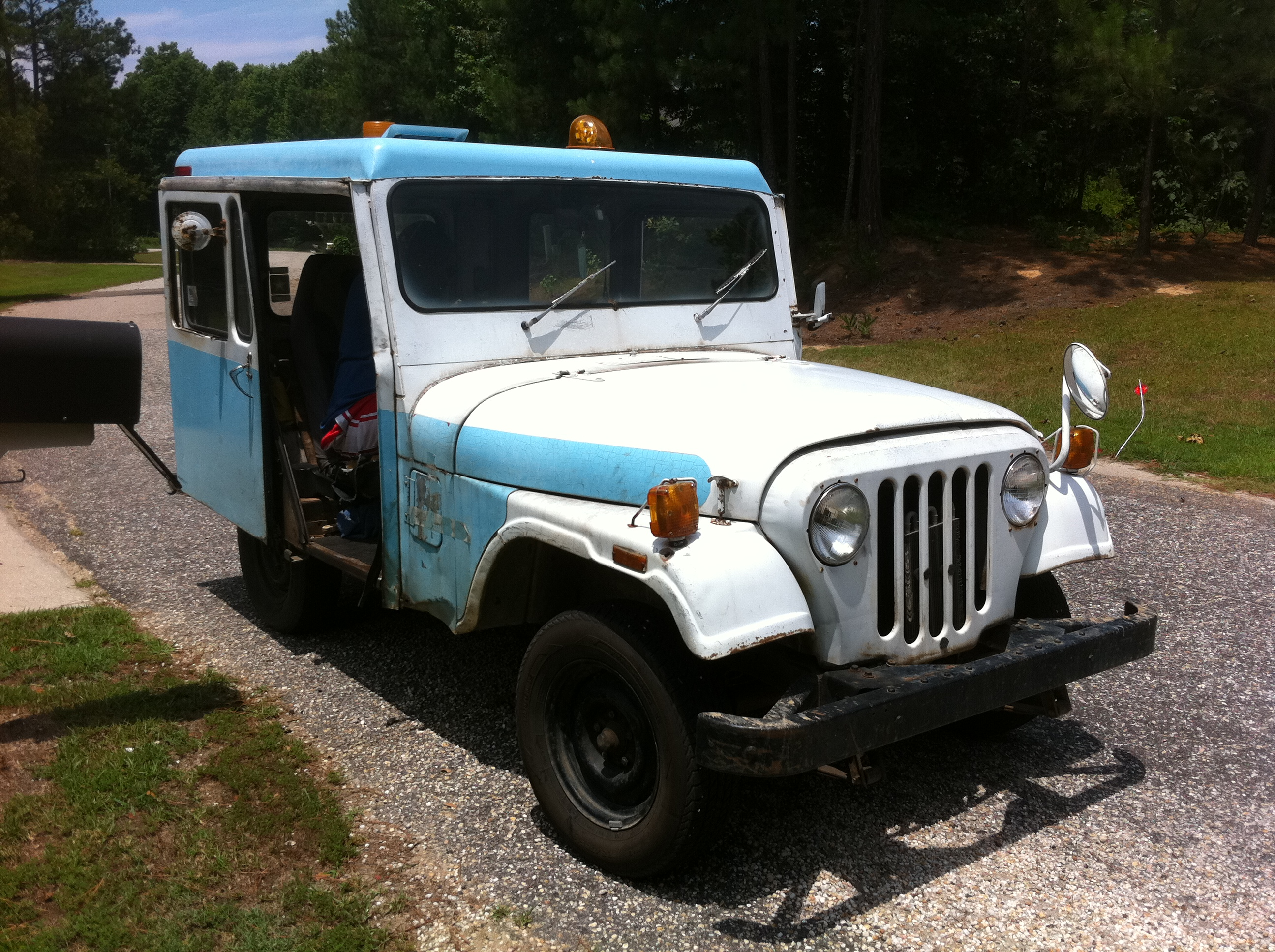
DJ-5 in post-USPS use with elongated grille

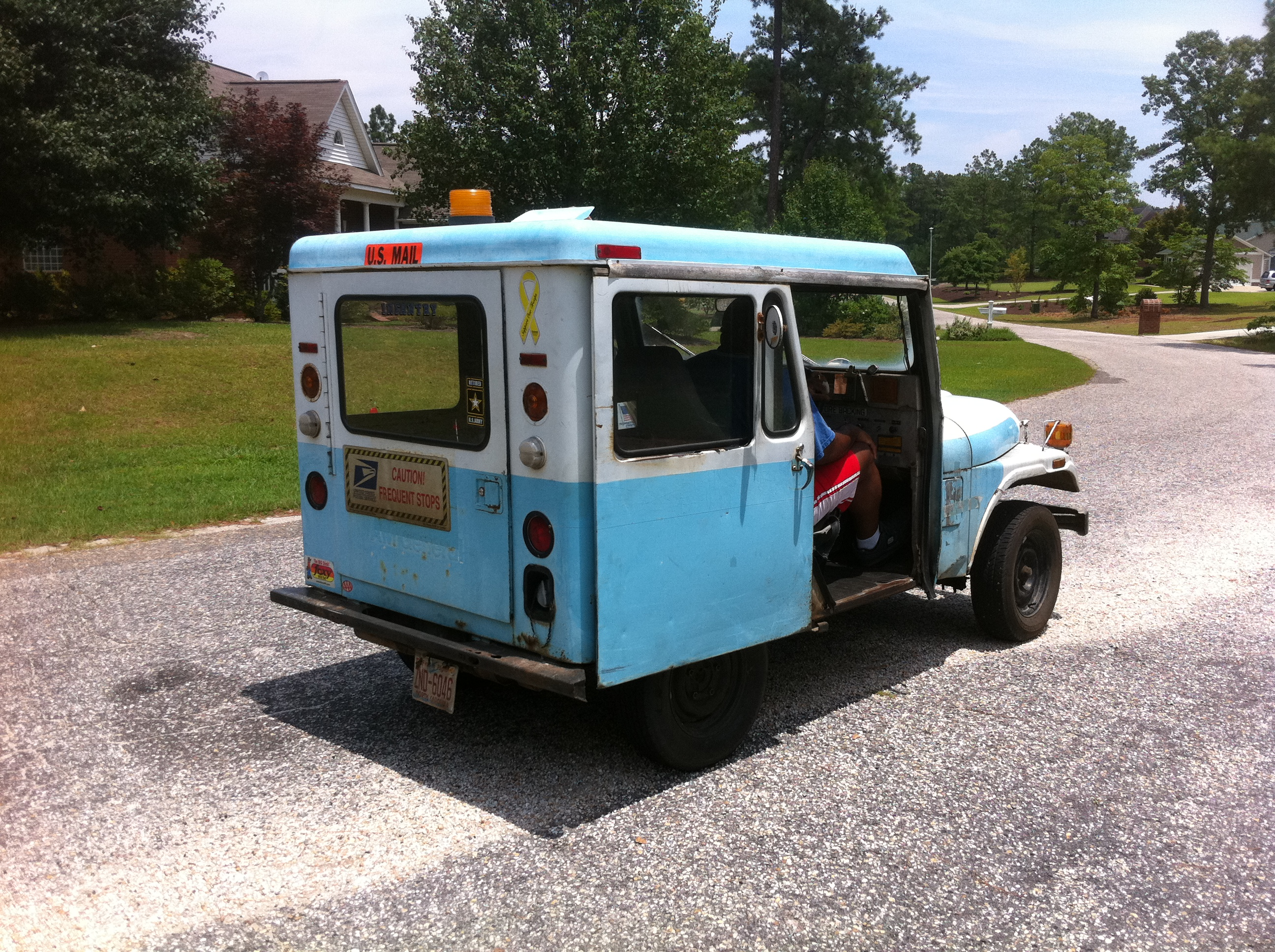
DJ-5 in post-USPS with large swinging rear door

DJ-5x model summary
Model	Years	Mfr.	Qty	Engine	Transmission
DJ-5A	1968–1970	Kaiser Jeep	24,000	Chevrolet 153, 153 cu in (2.5 L)	Powerglide 2-sp AT
DJ-5B	1970–1972	American Motors (1970) & AM General (1971+)	16,000	AMC I6, 232 cu in (3.8 L)	BorgWarner T-35, 3-sp AT
DJ-5C	1973–1974	American Motors (1970) & AM General (1971+)	21,000	AMC I6, 232 cu in (3.8 L)	BorgWarner T-35 or M-11, 3-sp AT
DJ-5D	1975–1976	American Motors (1970) & AM General (1971+)	13,000	AMC I6, 232 cu in (3.8 L)	TorqueFlite A727, 3-sp AT
DJ-5E	1976	American Motors (1970) & AM General (1971+)	350	Gould, Inc. DC traction motor and 18 kW-h lead-acid battery	
DJ-5F	1977–1978	American Motors (1970) & AM General (1971+)	6,000	AMC I6, 232 or 258 cu in (3.8 or 4.2 L)	TorqueFlite A727, 3-sp AT
DJ-5G	1979	American Motors (1970) & AM General (1971+)	9,000	Audi/VW EA831, 121.1 cu in (2.0 L)	TorqueFlite A904, 3-sp AT
DJ-5L	1982	American Motors (1970) & AM General (1971+)	18,000	GM Iron Duke, 150.8 cu in (2.5 L)	TorqueFlite A904, 3-sp AT
DJ-5M	1983–1984	American Motors (1970) & AM General (1971+)	30,000	AMC I4, 150 cu in (2.5 L)	TorqueFlite A904, 3-sp AT

=== DJ-5A ===
The DJ-5A was introduced in 1967, beginning the lettering system, indicating changes within the series. As initially produced by Kaiser Co., the DJ-5A used a standard CJ front end. It was equipped with a four-cylinder Chevrolet 153 engine, shared with the contemporary Nova, and two-speed Powerglide automatic transmission, with a T-handle shifter located on the floor next to the driver's seat. The main body was a single unit, resembling the earlier Jeep equipped with the metal Extreme Cold Weather Enclosure hard top.

There were no cutouts in the body for the rear wheels, which made tire changes more difficult, as even when the frame was jacked well off the ground, the axle did not fall enough for the tire to clear the body. The DJ-5A used standard 15-inch passenger car tires, with no provision for carrying a spare. While the front bumper was of the standard CJ design (though thinner and lighter than the original), the rear bumper was a unique design, a single stamped part that ran the full width of the vehicle. At each end was a rubber stopper for the sliding doors. The 10-gallon fuel tank was under the rear body, just ahead of the bumper.

=== DJ-5B ===
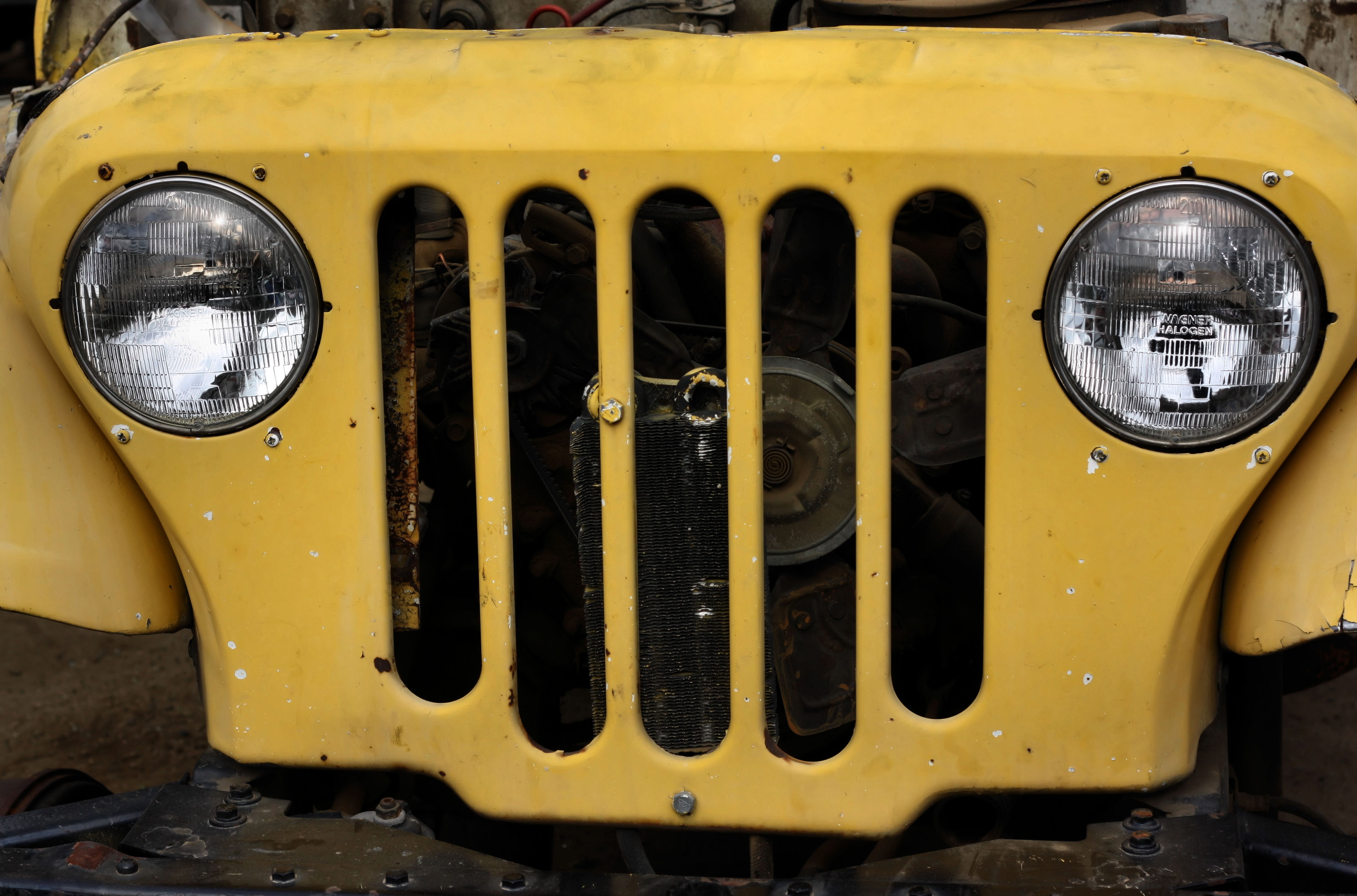
Close up of DJ-5 grille, with unique 5 slot design

After American Motors purchased Kaiser-Jeep in 1970, the AMC Straight-6 engine replaced the Chevy 153. In 1971, a unique five-slot grille without turn signals that were used only on postal Jeeps was introduced. The 1971 model has the grille extend past the front of the hood edge. This allowed more room for the larger engine and radiator. Like the DJ-5A, while resembling the CJ series, these were built as a completely enclosed, rear-wheel drive vehicle, with sliding side doors (which could be opened while driving), and a swinging rear door. Most models only had the driver's seat and a mail tray where the second seat would typically be. One improvement over earlier Jeeps was mounting the rear springs outside of the frame rails, thus providing greater stability for the vehicle with its top-heavy enclosed cargo area, especially at highway speeds. Most models were also equipped with a limited-slip differential and a heavy-duty steering gearbox. Other improvements include a vent in the roof and cut-outs around the rear tires.

=== DJ-5E Electruck ===
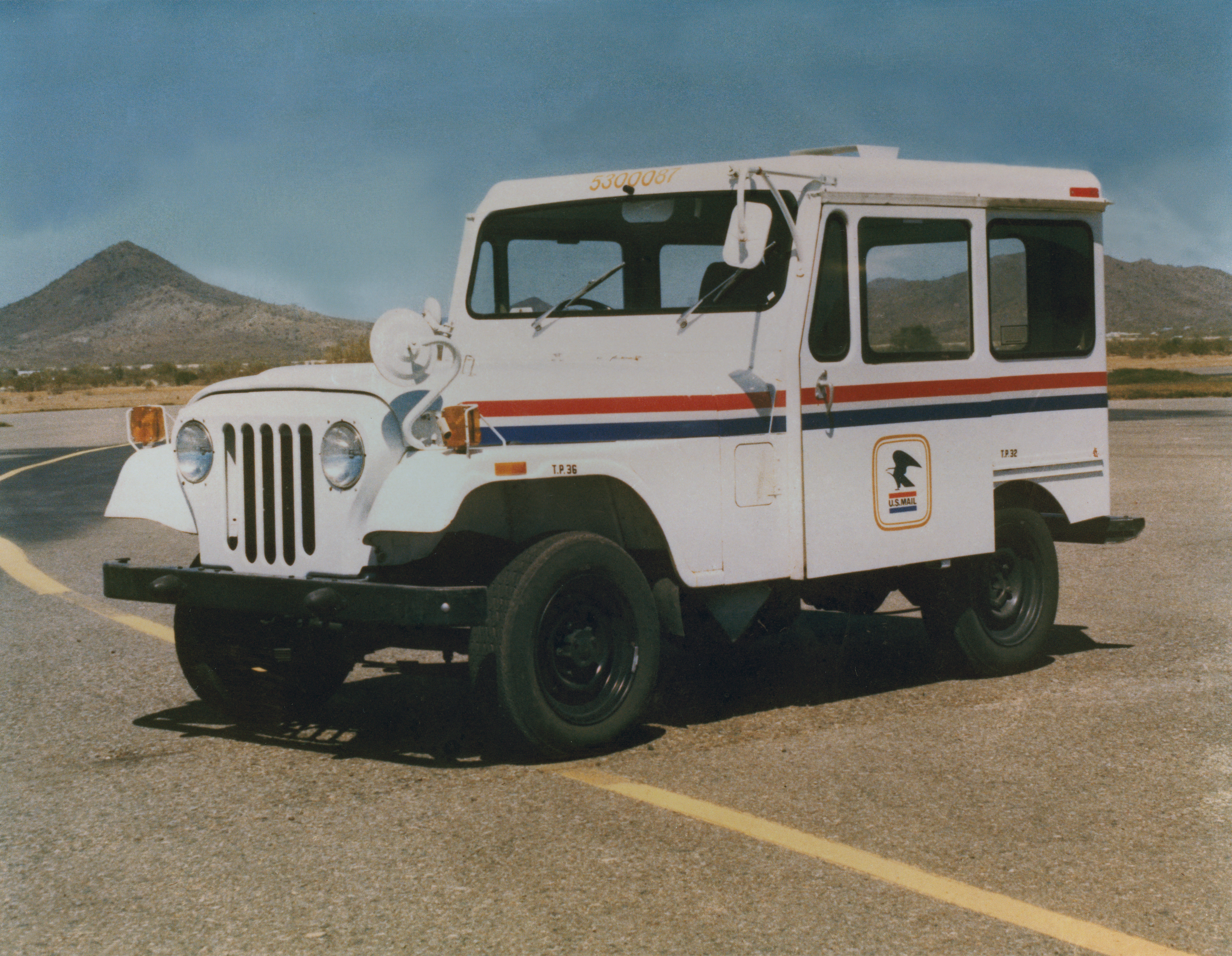
DJ-5E Electruck in USPS livery at NASA's Glenn Research Center

American Motors experimented with electric vehicles and starting in 1974 mass-produced the DJ-5E, a rear-wheel drive electric delivery van, also known as the Electruck.

Similar in appearance and in most of its dimensions, the DJ-5E was powered by a set of 27-volt lead-acid batteries with a 54-volt 30 bhp (22 kW; 30 PS) compound wound DC motor. The motor was mounted in the location of the conventional transmission with a short driveshaft to the rear differential featuring a 5.89:1 gear ratio. The engine bay contained the battery pack totaling 330 amp hours (17.8 kWh) capacity. The Electruck featured an electronic, silicon-controlled, rectifier-based, and continuously-adjustable speed electronic module made by Gould Electronics that controlled forward or reverse direction, provided for regenerative braking, and supplied 12-volt power for accessories and lighting. The Electruck had a top speed of 40 mph (64 km/h) and was capable of cruising at 33 mph (53 km/h) with a range of 29 mi (47 km) with 20% of its battery power remaining in reserve.

Analysis by NASA in 1977 concluded that the DJ-5E was "state-of-the-art." The U.S. Postal Service performed a "Route Profile Analysis," and the DJ-5E returned with a favorable verdict. It purchased 352 vehicles for mail delivery in cities with severe air pollution. Five units were acquired by Canada Post for a total of 357 Electrucks built by AM General.

== Model numbers ==
- DJ-3A (1955–1965): 134 cu in (2.2 L) Willys Go Devil straight-4 L-head engine, three-speed manual
- DJ-5 (1965–1967): 134 cu in (2.2 L) Willys Hurricane straight-4 F-head engine, three-speed manual
- DJ-5A (1968–1970): 153 cu in (2.5 L) Chevy Nova straight-4, two-speed Powerglide automatic
- DJ-5B (1970–1972): 232 cu in (3.8 L) AMC Straight-6 engine, BorgWarner T-35 three-speed automatic
- DJ-5C (1973–1974): 232 cu in (3.8 L) AMC Straight-6 engine, T-35 or M-11 automatic
- DJ-5D (1975–1976): 232 cu in (3.8 L) AMC Straight-6 engine, 727 TorqueFlite automatic
- DJ-5E (1976): Electruck Electric
- DJ-5F (1977–1978): 232 cu in (3.8 L) or 258 cu in (4.2 L) AMC Straight-6 engine, 727 TorqueFlite automatic
- DJ-5G (1979): AMC (Audi) 121 cu in (2.0 L) straight-4, 904 TorqueFlite automatic or 232 cu in (3.8 L) or 258 cu in (4.2 L) AMC Straight-6 engine, 727 TorqueFlite automatic
- DJ-5L (1982): GM Iron Duke engine 151 cu in (2.5 L) straight-4, Chrysler 904 transmission
- DJ-5M (1983–1984): 150 cu in (2.5 L) AMC straight-4 engine, Chrysler 904 transmission
- DJ-5F Diesel (1978 never went into production) Perkins 2.7 L 4.165 Two DJ-5 Jeeps were brought over from AMC in the United States to the Perkins factory in England to see if it was economical to install a 2.7 Diesel engine. This was as an official conversion. It was found that this endeavour was uneconomical. One DJ5 was returned to the United States and subsequently destroyed. The other remained at the Perkins factory in England running errands around the site. In 2008 it was fully restored from the ground up with many imported parts from the USA at cost then of £8000. At present this DJ5 F is in private ownership, still road worthy and is the only official diesel variant of its kind remaining in existence.

== See also ==
- Jeep CJ § Alaska Postal Service
- Jeep Wrangler (TJ) § Postal Service
- Jeep Wrangler (JK) § Postal Service
