= Utilimaster =

US truck manufacturers

- Founded: 1973
- Headquarters: Bristol, Indiana, U.S.
- Products: Multi-stop trucks
- Parent: The Shyft Group
- Website: utilimaster.com

Utilimaster, a subsidiary of The Shyft Group, manufactures multi-stop trucks. It was founded in 1973 in Wakarusa, Indiana.

In 1996, Utilimaster was bought for $65 million from Harley-Davidson by senior management and an investment group which was led by Kirkland Messina. It had been owned by Holiday Rambler before Harley-Davidson. On November 19, 2009, Spartan Motors (now The Shyft Group) acquired Utilimaster for $45 million in an all-cash transaction. Spartan sold the Road Rescue division to Allied Specialty Vehicles in 2010.

Utilimaster bought Union City Body Company, a competitor from Union City, Indiana, for an undisclosed amount on November 16, 2005. Union City Body bought the General Motors chassis and commercial truck business in 1998.

== Products ==
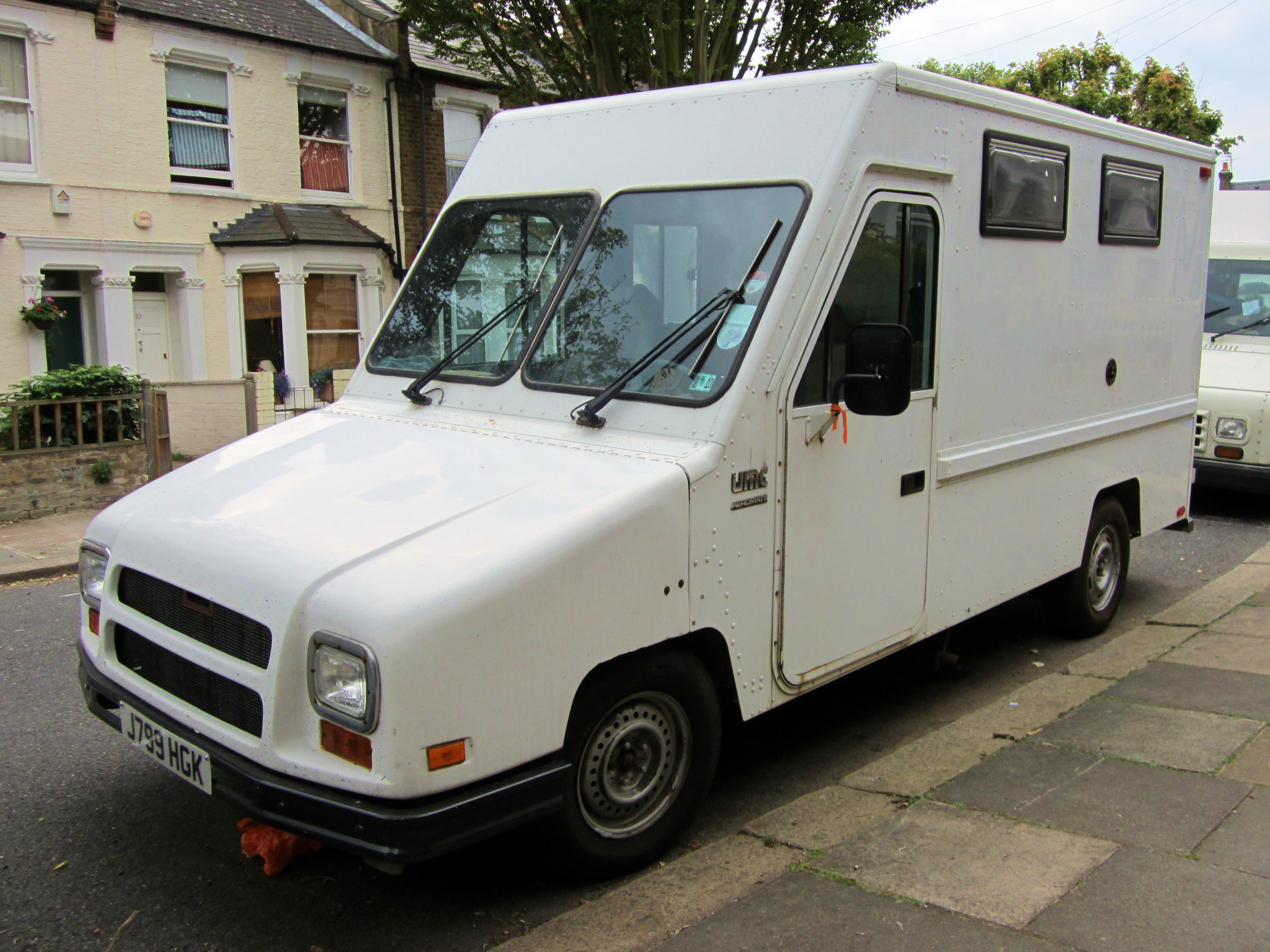
1992 Utilimaster (UMC) Aeromate

In the 1980s and 1990s, the company manufactured the aerodynamic Aeromate on an in-house, front-wheel drive chassis. The original model was introduced in August 1988 and used Chrysler's 2.5-liter inline-four engine known from the K-car. Later models used either the turbocharged version of Chrysler's 2.5-litre four cylinder engine or their 3.3-litre V6 engine; the V6 was introduced for the 1991 model year. With a 5,500-pound (2,495 kg) GVWR the vehicle's payload was 2,050 lb (930 kg) with either engine fitted.

In mid-1990, Utilimaster introduced the larger Aeromaster Z2000 for the 1991 model year. The aerodynamic walk-in van was also built on a proprietary front-wheel drive chassis, and came in GVWRs ranging from 10,000 to 12,500 lb (4,540 to 5,670 kg). The engine options were a Ford gasoline V8 or a Cummins' 4BT four-cylinder diesel.

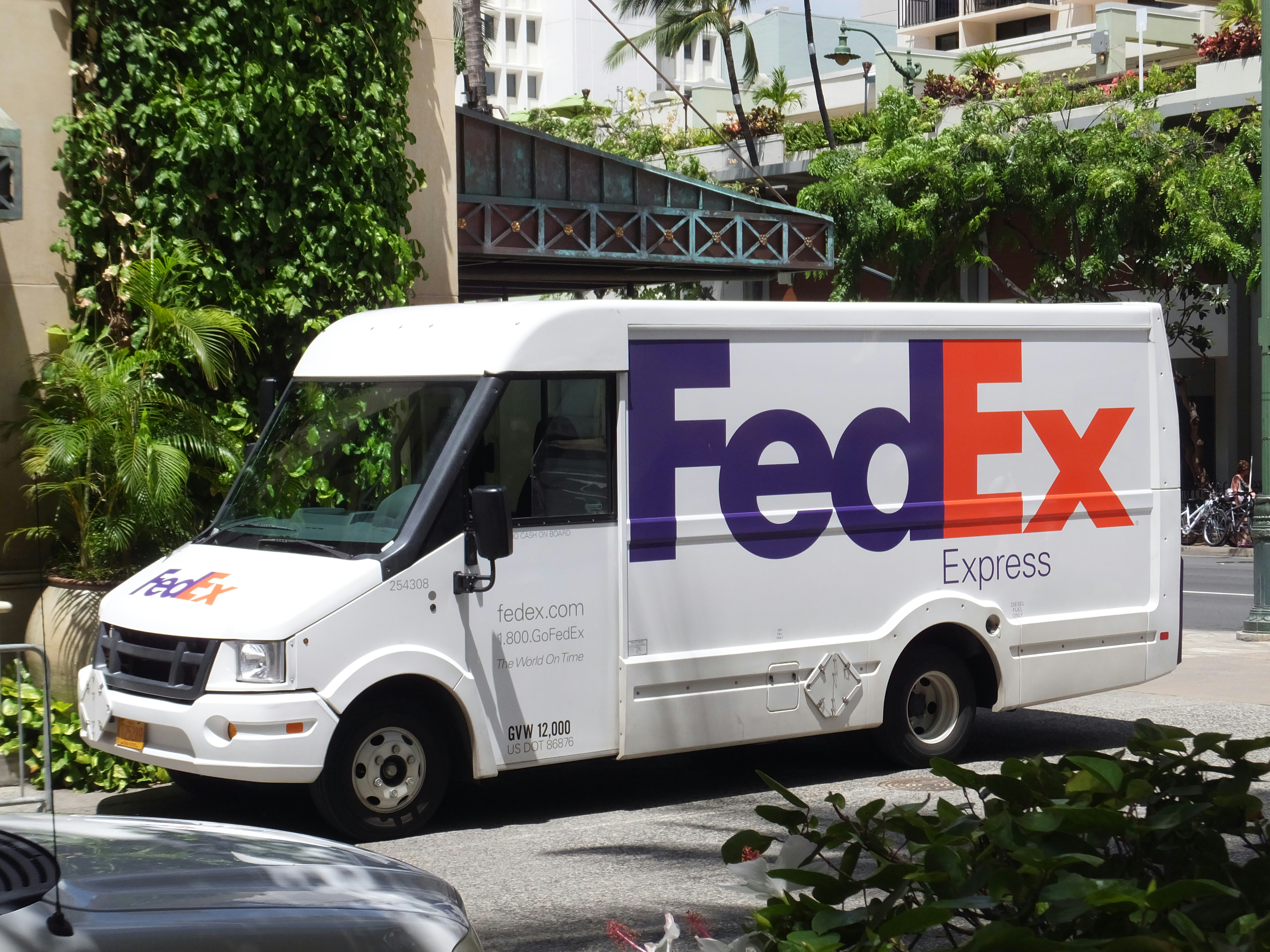
Isuzu Reach in FedEx livery

In 2011, Isuzu and Utilimaster announced plans for Utilimaster to assemble the Isuzu Reach in its Wakarusa, Indiana, plant. It is a commercial step van with improved aerodynamics and a more fuel-efficient engine than other walk-in vans in the class. On February 14, 2012, Utilimaster announced that it would move from Wakarusa to Bristol, Indiana, 17 miles away.

In 2012, Utilimaster and Smith co-developed an integrated walk-in van design using Smith's Newton chassis platform. The Newton Step Van was available in configurations of 14,000 to 26,000 lbs. GVW and 650 to 1,200 cubic feet and provided a range of approximately 100 miles on a single charge. In 2015, Utilimaster introduced the first walk-in cargo van, which they named Velocity. The van was developed on the Ford Transit chassis, available in gas, diesel, or CNG/LPG configurations.

In 2020, at the NTEA's Work Truck Show, Utilimaster announced the Velocity M3, a walk-in cargo van built on the Mercedes Sprinter chassis. In 2020, Utilimaster announced the Velocity F2, a sub-10,000 lbs. GVWR walk-in cargo van built on the Ford Transit chassis.

On 6 March 2023 Utilimaster announced the deployment in 5,860 walk-in vans of its Rapid Driver Cooling System.
