= Dynamic design analysis method =

US Navy-developed analytical procedure

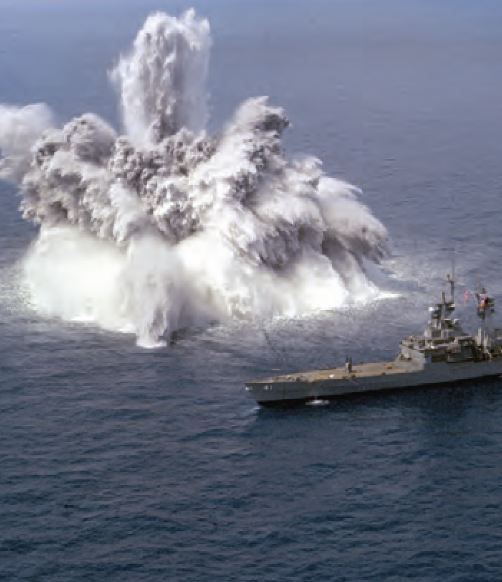
All mission-essential equipment on board naval ships and submarines must be qualified for shock loads caused by underwater explosions.

The dynamic design analysis method (DDAM) is a US Navy-developed analytical procedure for evaluating the design of equipment subject to dynamic loading caused by underwater explosions (UNDEX). The analysis uses a form of shock spectrum analysis that estimates the dynamic response of a component to shock loading caused by the sudden movement of a naval vessel. The analytical process simulates the interaction between the shock-loaded component and its fixed structure, and it is a standard naval engineering procedure for shipboard structural dynamics.

== Background and rationale ==
All mission-essential equipment on board military surface ships and submarines must be qualified for underwater shock loads caused by depth charges, naval mines, missiles, and torpedoes. An underwater explosion nearby a ship or submarine can be devastating to the combat readiness of the vessel. Damage may occur in the form of dished hull plating or even more serious holing of the hull. Moreover, some damage may not be obvious and can occur as a result of shock-wave loading of equipment and systems aboard the vessel. Equipment damage may incapacitate a vessel. Much research effort has been expended in the study of underwater shock, especially during the period after World War II where it became obvious that navy vessels could be disabled by a non-contact underwater explosion. Thus a concerted effort was made to try to make shipboard equipment more resistant to shock. This was achieved through laboratory shock testing of equipment prior to its installation aboard vessels. With the advances in computer simulation and modeling capabilities, it is now possible to simulate a vessel's response to an underwater explosion and to identify potential problems or failures without extensive field testing. By using DDAM analytical techniques, money and time are saved.

== Analysis methodology ==
The DDAM simulates the interaction between the shock-loaded component and its fixed structure as the free motion of a naval vessel in water produces a higher shock spectrum than a heavy structure would when mounted to a terrestrial surface. The DDAM takes interaction into account in relation to the mass of the equipment, its mounting location, and the orientation of the equipment on the vessel.

Engineers use finite element method analysis software to verify designs using DDAM computer simulations that model the known characteristics of underwater explosion phenomena as well as the surface ship or submarine body responses to shock loading and application of a shock spectra in order to apply the appropriate shock responses at the mountings of shipboard equipment (e.g., masts, propulsion shafts, rudders, rudderstocks, bearings, exhaust uptakes and other critical structures) due to underwater explosions. The analytical process is described in NAVSEA 0908-LP-000-3010, Shock Design Criteria for Surface Ships which provides technical criteria for shock design calculations, and provides general background and educational material concerning application of the DDAM.

A number of commercially available computer modeling and simulation programs are available to assist in this task. After the analyst performs a natural frequency analysis to determine the mode shapes and natural frequencies, the DDAM process then uses an input spectrum of shock design values (i.e., displacements or accelerations) based on data from a series of unclassified Naval Research Laboratory reports (primarily MR-1396, Design Values for Shock Design of Shipboard Equipment and FR-6267, Background for Mechanical Shock Design of Ships). Compliance standards for DDAM simulation and analysis software are maintained by the Naval Sea Systems Command (NAVSEA).

== Reporting formats ==
The Naval Sea Systems Command (NAVSEA) established a standardized format to describe the content and formats for publishing results of the DDAM analyses and technical reports. These templates are called Data Item Descriptions (DID); once these are specified or tailored for a specific contract, they become Contract Data Requirements List items (CDRLs) that represent the deliverable items of a contract. Exactly which data items are required for delivery depends on the nature of the project. The DIDs for DDAM activities are the Analysis Report, Dynamic Shock, Mathematical Model Report, Dynamic Shock Analysis, and Dynamic Shock Analysis Extension Request.
