= Oshkosh NGDV =

2020s replacement for the US Postal Service's local delivery fleet

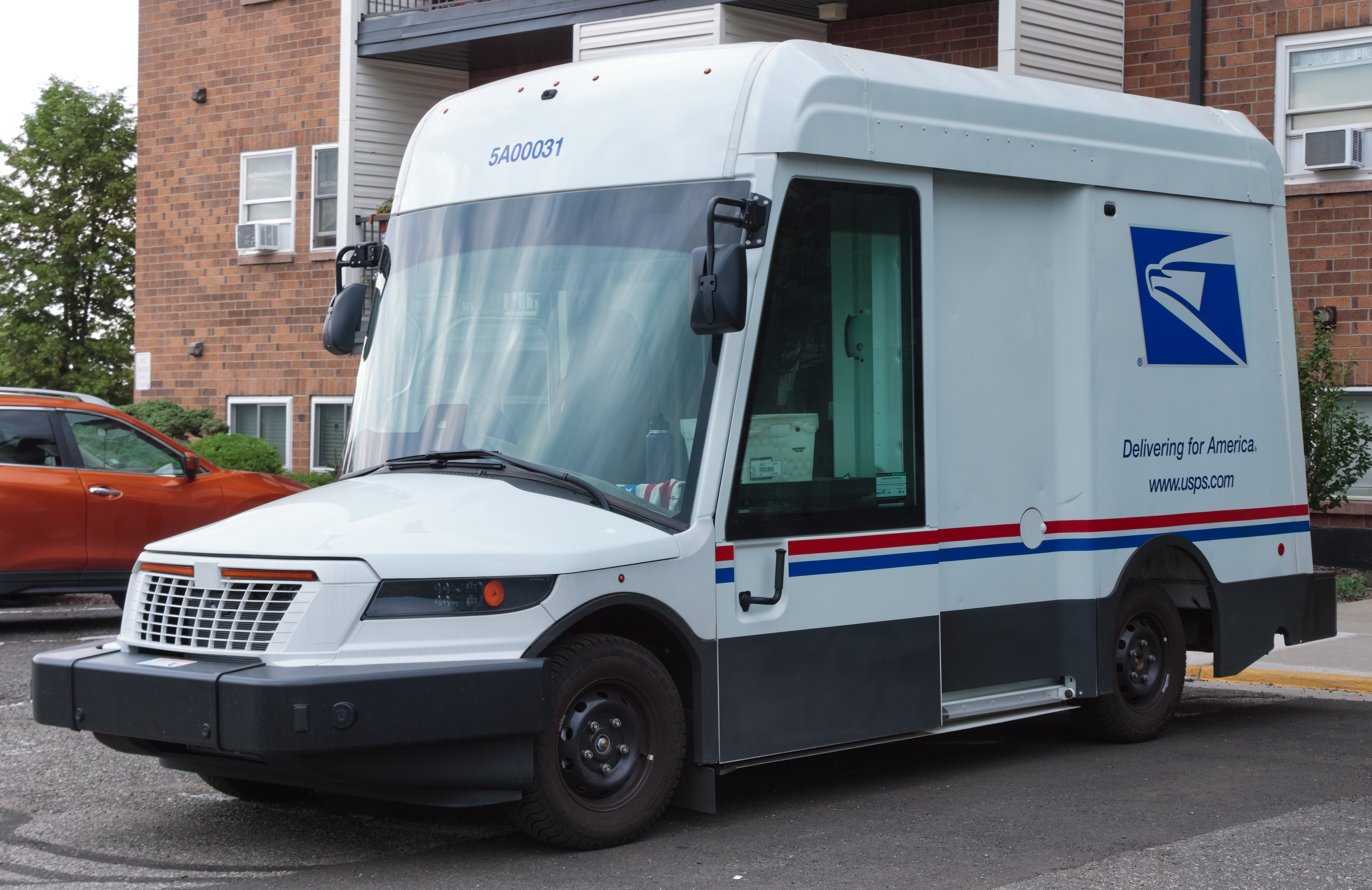
- An NGDV in service in Golden, Colorado

Overview
- Manufacturer: Oshkosh
- Model years: 2024–present
- Assembly: Spartanburg, South Carolina, United States

Body and chassis
- Class: Mail truck
- Layout: Front-engine, front-wheel drive; Front-engine, all-wheel drive

Powertrain
- Engine: 2.0 L (122 cu in) Ford EcoBoost T I4 (ICE)
- Electric motor: Bosch permanent-magnet
- Transmission: 8F35 8-speed automatic (ICE)
- Battery: 94 kW-hr Li-ion
- Electric range: 70 mi (110 km) (est.)

Dimensions
- Wheelbase: 127 in (3,226 mm)
- Length: 235.75 in (5,988 mm)
- Width: 84.5 in (2,146 mm)
- Height: 111 in (2,819 mm)
- Curb weight: 5,560–6,670 lb (2,522–3,025 kg)

Chronology
- Predecessor: Grumman LLV; Ford-Utilimaster FFV

The Oshkosh Next Generation Delivery Vehicle (NGDV) is a mail truck for the United States Postal Service (USPS). The contract, which is valued at $6 billion, was awarded to Oshkosh Defense of Oshkosh Corporation in February 2021. Up to 160,000 vehicles will be built in a new South Carolina factory. Four variants of the NGDV are expected to be in fleet use: both gasoline-powered and battery-electric, in either front-wheel drive or all-wheel drive. The USPS was scheduled to start receiving the vehicles October 2023, but repeated delays meant that only 2,500 vehicles had been delivered by November 2025.

== History ==
=== Background ===
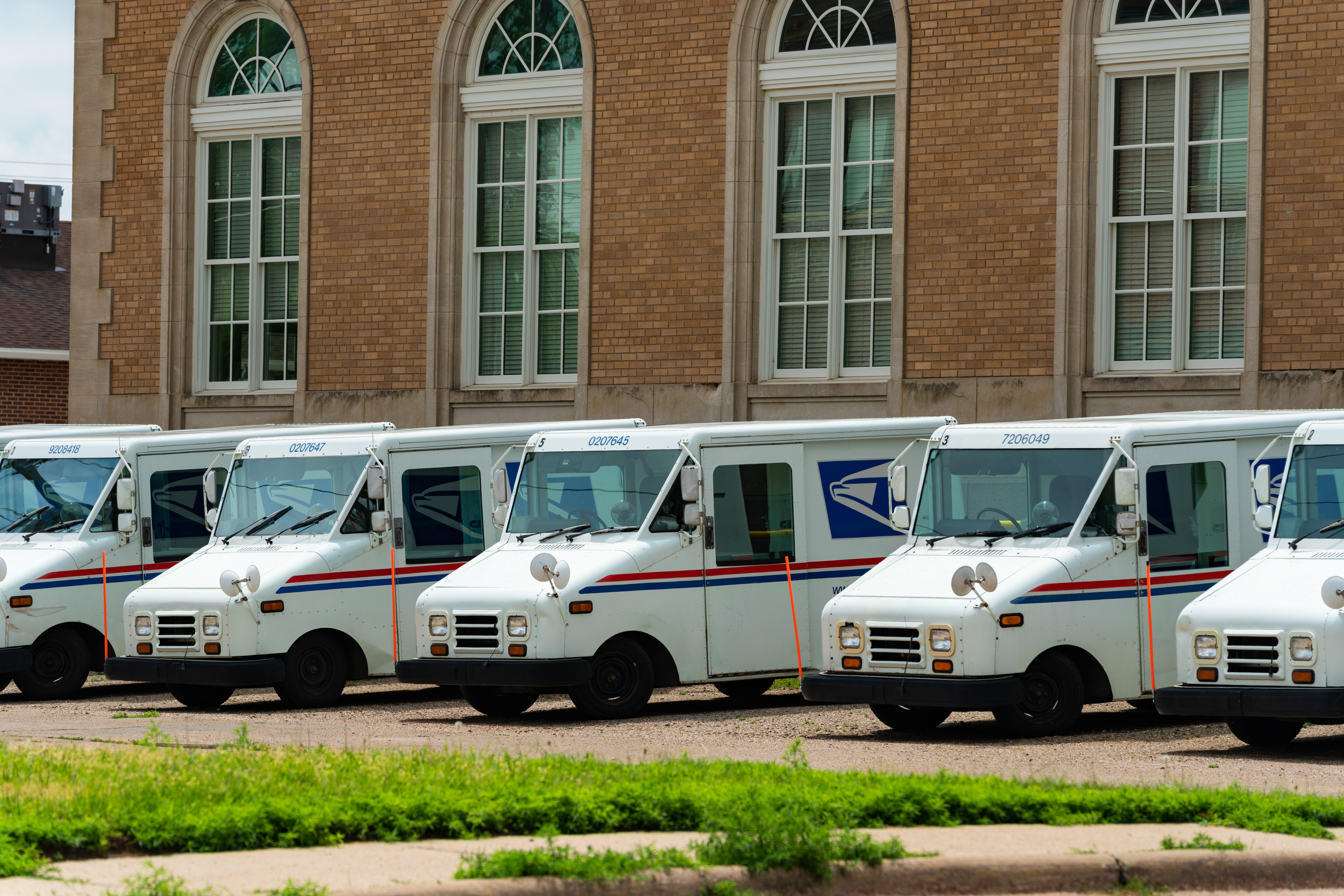
Grumman LLV mail trucks at a post office in South Dakota. The USPS has operated the LLV since 1987.

The USPS purchased a fleet of purpose-built Grumman LLV mail delivery vehicles in the late 1980s. The similar Ford-Utilimaster FFV was introduced in the late 1990s in smaller numbers. The LLV fleet lacks safety features that became common after their introduction, including airbags, anti-lock brakes, and backup cameras. As of 2013, the USPS local delivery fleet consisted of approximately 212,000 vehicles, 142,000 of which were LLVs.

On January 20, 2015, the USPS issued a Request for Information (RFI) notice for a Next Generation Delivery Vehicle. On February 13, 2015, it was announced that General Motors would be bidding on the contract, which would include the construction of 180,000 new vehicles at a cost of at least $5 billion. The stated goal of the contract was to have the first vehicles on the road by 2018. Potential bidders had until March 5, 2015, to submit comments and pre-qualification responses. The USPS issued a Request for Proposal (RFP) to 15 prequalified companies on April 14, 2015; General Motors was not on the prequalified list. The prototype RFP was issued on October 20, 2015, and updated on December 1, including a Statement of Objectives (SOO) providing preliminary vehicle specifications, vehicle performance targets, and a Statement of Work providing a sample driving cycle.

=== Design specification ===
Under the draft design specification issued in January 2015, the NGDV was to have a minimum lifespan of 12 years and a target lifespan of 20 years. The cargo area was required to enclose a minimum volume of 4.38 m^{3} (155 cu ft) with a minimum payload capacity of 680 kg (1,500 lb). Vehicles were required to be able to maintain a speed of 65 mph (105 km/h) on level roads, accelerating to that speed within 35 seconds. In addition, vehicles were required to maintain 45 mph (72 km/h) on a 2.5% grade and be capable of stopping on such a grade, and then ascend a 20% grade in both forward and reverse.

In the prototype RFP, these requirements were updated to include the delivery of six prototype examples in two sizes: a "standard" vehicle accommodating 155 ft^{3} (4.4 m^{3}) of cargo and a "small" vehicle with 121 ft^{3} (3.4 m^{3}), with both sizes not to exceed 112 in (2,800 mm) of height. The minimum sustained road speed was 60 mph (97 km/h) with a grade of up to 1% at an altitude of 3,000 ft (910 m) or less, with a minimum operating range of 70 mi (110 km) including 600 stops and starts while using the heating and air conditioning systems and accessories at their maximum settings, to maintain cabin temperatures of 65–85 °F (18–29 °C) when ambient temperatures are −30–120 °F (−34–49 °C). The cargo area was required to accommodate heights ranging up to the 95th percentile male without stooping while setting the maximum exterior height at 122 in (3,100 mm). The maximum target unit price was US$35,000.

=== Prototype competition ===
On September 22, 2016, the United States Postal Service awarded the NGDV Prototype Contract to six selected suppliers: AM General (in partnership with Emerald Automotive), Karsan (in partnership with Morgan Olson), Mahindra, Oshkosh (in partnership with Ford), Utilimaster, and a joint-venture bid involving Workhorse and VT Hackney. Half of the prototypes were to feature hybrid and new technologies, including alternative fuel capabilities. The prototypes represented a variety of vehicle sizes and drive configurations, in addition to advanced power trains and a range of hybrid technologies.

The prototypes were delivered to the USPS in late September 2017. Examples from AM General, Karsan, Mahindra, Oshkosh, and VT Hackney/Workhorse were spotted while undergoing testing in 2017 and 2018. Vehicle testing took place at the Transportation Research Center (East Liberty, Ohio), supplemented by component testing in Bohemia, New York and field testing in Flint and Utica, Michigan; Alexandria and Manassas, Virginia; and Tempe, Tucson, and Apache Junction, Arizona. However, many of the prototypes exhibited "critical safety failures during the prototype testing phase, including brake failures and leaking fuel tanks", and the USPS returned all the prototypes to the Transportation Research Center for rework in November 2017; testing resumed in April 2018 and was completed in March 2019.

The Oshkosh prototype was derived from the Ford Transit commercial van, while the Karsan prototype combined a purpose-built tall body by Morgan Olson, allowing mail carriers to stand upright in the cargo area, with a plug-in hybrid gasoline-electric drivetrain. The Mahindra prototype also used a boxy, bespoke body with a short hood, similar in appearance to the VT Hackney/Workhorse prototype, which was equipped with a battery-electric powertrain and a gasoline-powered range extender. The AM General prototype used switchgear from Geely/Volvo and a start-stop system to reduce fuel consumption rates. According to Emerald Automotive officials, the AM General/Emerald and Oshkosh/Ford vehicles were leading the candidates, as the other vehicles required constant repair and towing from the test track.

Numerous candidates resigned from the NGDV prototype competition before the USPS selected the winner, as competition results and selection of a winning prototype had been expected in late 2016, but these were not announced until 2021, in part due to delays in assembling the prototypes; because the candidate suppliers only had 18 weeks to assemble and perform internal testing before shipping the prototypes to USPS, many vehicles were faulty and the USPS returned the entire initial batch. In addition, testing was extended by three to eight months because USPS added durability and simulated field tests during the competition; testing was not completed until March 2019. With testing complete, USPS met with the manufacturers and the National Association of Letter Carriers (NALC) to finalize the specifications, which were issued in June 2019.

Utilimaster withdrew from the competition in February 2017, and London Electric Vehicle Company, which was supplying powertrain technology to AM General, announced in December 2018 they would not participate past the prototype stage. Workhorse bought out VT Hackney in December 2019 after the latter company withdrew from the competition. Final bids from the vendors to the revised specification were delivered in July 2020, delayed by the COVID-19 pandemic. However, Mahindra pulled out in August 2020, citing financial issues. By December 2020, just Karsan, Oshkosh, and Workhorse were left. Final technical and financial reviews were completed in January 2021.

=== Award ===
In February 2021, the contract was awarded to Oshkosh Defense, a wholly owned subsidiary of Oshkosh Corporation in Oshkosh, Wisconsin. The competitively awarded indefinite delivery, indefinite quantity (IDIQ) contract allows for the delivery of between 50,000 and 165,000 vehicles over a period of 10 years. Under the initial contract USPS has committed to pay Oshkosh Defense $482 million to initiate engineering efforts to finalize the production vehicle design, and for tooling and factory build-out activities that are necessary prior to vehicle production.

The Workhorse Group, an electric truck builder based in Loveland, Ohio and one of the losing bidders, initially protested the award to Oshkosh by filing a lawsuit, but dropped the case in September 2021, one day before the case would be heard in court.

USPS placed its first order in March 2022, at a contract value of $2.98 billion, for 50,000 NGDVs, of which at least 10,019 will be the battery-electric variant; the average per-unit cost of an NGDV is about $59,600. The first deliveries of NGDVs were expected in 2023. The exact number of electric NGDVs is flexible and can be adjusted in the future. After the USPS was sued by multiple groups in April 2022 to block the procurement, the USPS announced plans in July to increase the proportion of electric NGDVs in the initial procurement to 50% and add 34,500 more commercially available battery-electric vehicles. Later that December, the USPS announced the addition of $3 billion from the Inflation Reduction Act would allow the procurement of 45,000 battery-electric NGDVs out of at least 60,000 NGDVs in total, to be delivered by 2028. Mail delivery using the first NGDVs was still expected to start in late 2023.

=== Production ===
In June 2021, Oshkosh stated that after a long search, the company will assemble the new mail truck at a new, dedicated factory in Spartanburg, South Carolina, and will employ more than 1,000 local non-union workers. In Spartanburg, Oshkosh Defense is refitting a large warehouse at the Flatwood Industrial Park that previously was used by Rite Aid as a distribution center; when complete, the building will be used for NGDV production. Oshkosh expects to spend $155 million to retool the facility. South Carolina provided a $9 million grant and a 40% discount on property taxes for 40 years.

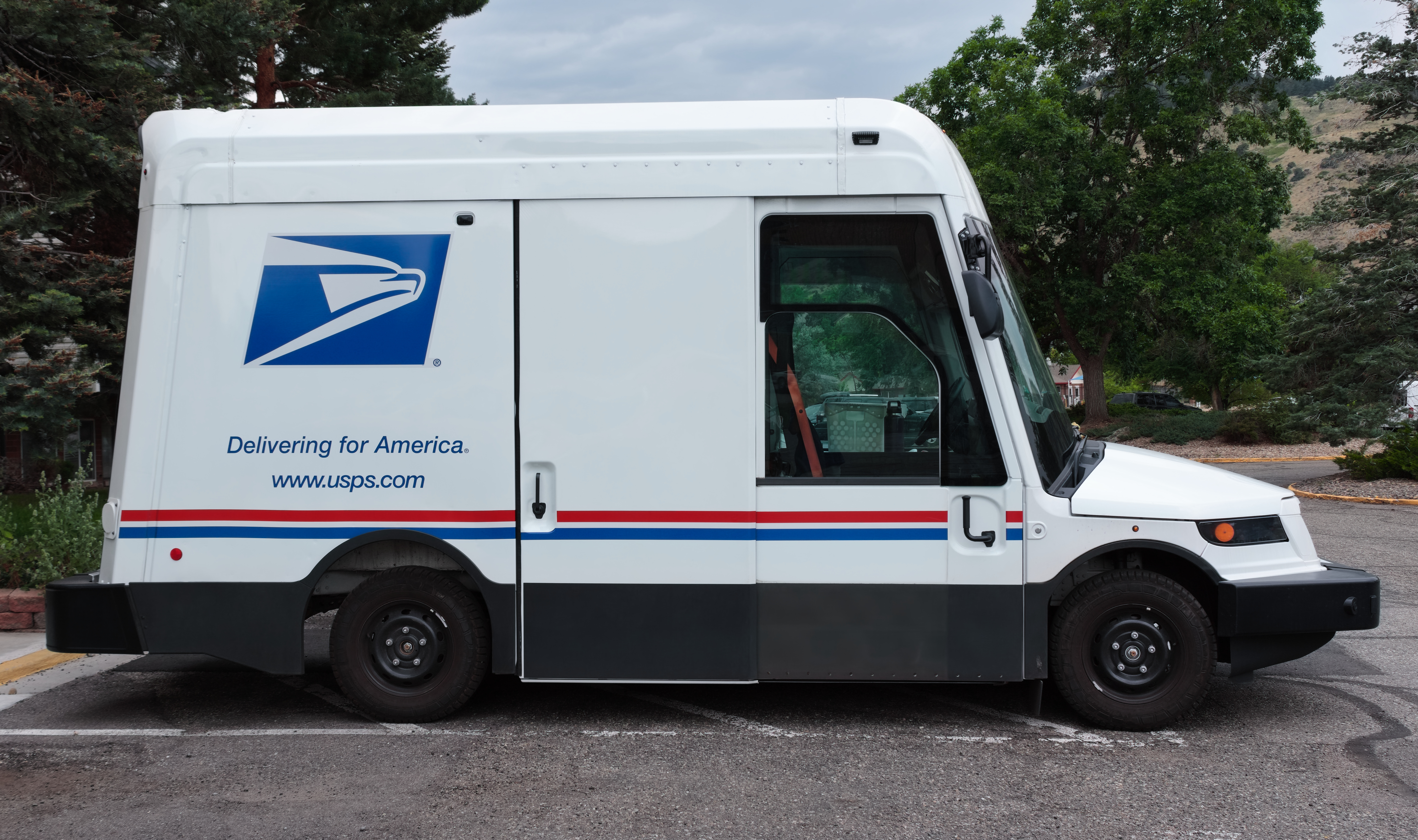
Side view of the NGDV, showing the sliding doors

The announcement that production would take place in South Carolina using non-union labor was criticized as a bait-and-switch scheme by multiple politicians who had expected the vehicles to be built by unionized workers in Oshkosh's home state of Wisconsin. Senator Ron Johnson (R-WI) declined to challenge the company to relocate production to his home state: "It's not like we don't have enough jobs here in Wisconsin. The biggest problem we have in Wisconsin right now is employers not being able to find enough workers." According to Johnson, Oshkosh had approached Foxconn to inquire if Oshkosh could lease space at the nascent Foxconn facility in Mount Pleasant, Wisconsin for NGDV production, but the two companies were unable to reach an agreement.

The House Committee on Oversight and Reform sent letters to Oshkosh officials in March 2022, seeking insight into the company's reasons to build the NGDV factory in Spartanburg rather than retooling existing factories in Oshkosh, Wisconsin. The president of Oshkosh Defense, John Bryant, had stated previously the minimum size for the NGDV factory was 825,000 ft^{2} (7.66 ha), and it did not own any buildings in Wisconsin that were large enough to accommodate NGDV production. State Representative Gordon Hintz (D-Oshkosh) noted that Foxconn's Mount Pleasant facility was sufficiently large, and speculated that negotiations between Oshkosh and Foxconn may have broken down over who would assume responsibility for manufacturing: "I don't think Foxconn originally wanted to be a landlord". Hintz concluded that "if two years pass and there's nothing in [Foxconn's] million-square-foot facility when we could have been producing postal trucks, you know, under this contract, we'll look back at it as a missed opportunity." A NGDV technical center will be established in the buildings owned by the company in its eponymous Oshkosh, Wisconsin location for engineering and technical support, employing approximately 100.

=== Changes to battery-electric drivetrain proportion ===
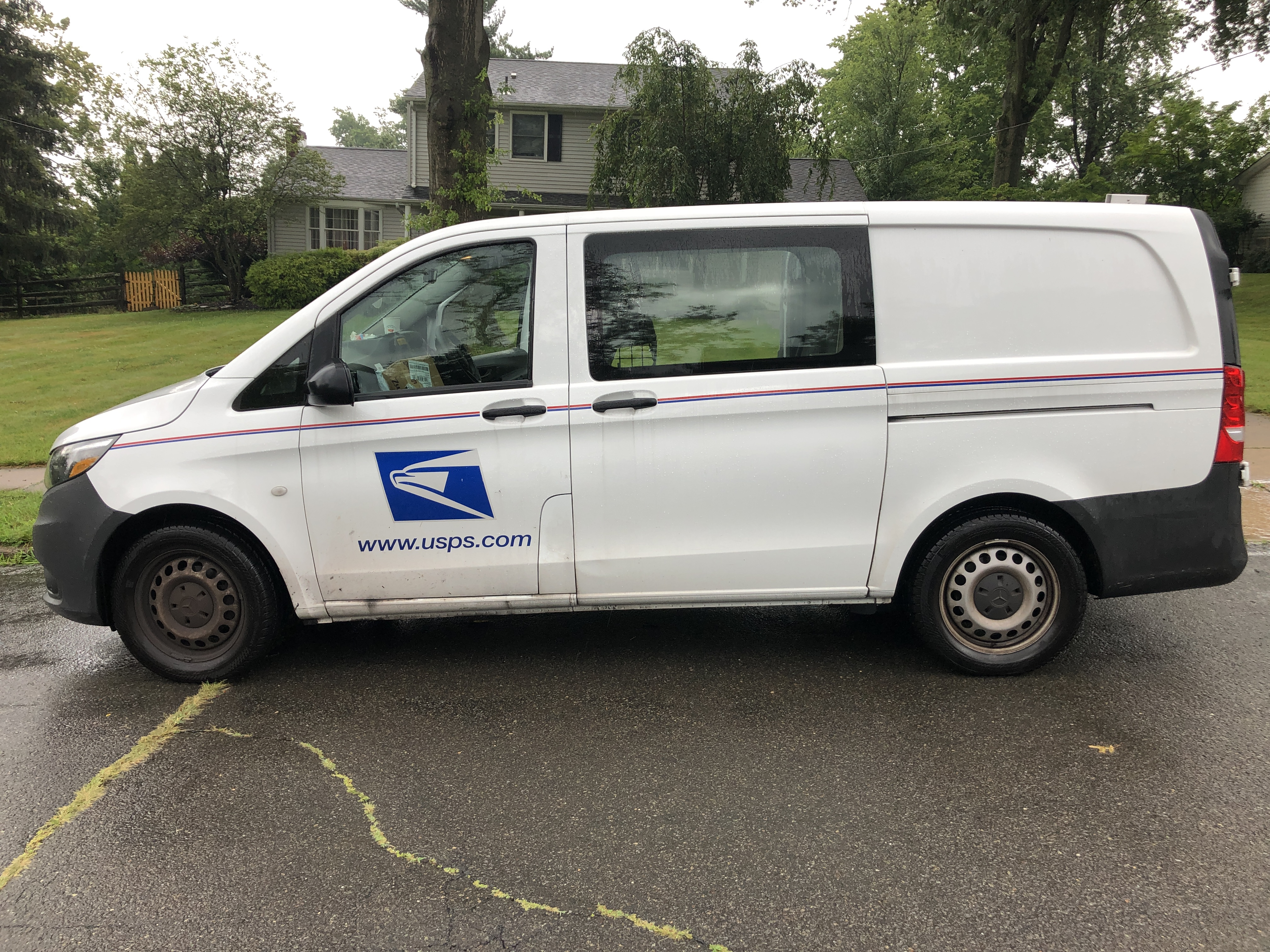
A USPS Mercedes-Benz Metris minivan, evaluated as a commercial off-the-shelf alternative to the NGDV

Shortly after the contract was awarded to Oshkosh in February 2021, Postmaster General Louis DeJoy appeared before the United States House of Representatives, where he testified only 10% of the planned NGDVs would be battery electric vehicles (BEVs). In response to an enquiry from Representative Jackie Speier asking why the new fleet was not 90% BEV instead of 10% BEV, DeJoy stated that 90% BEV target would require "3 or 4 extra billion [dollars]" to implement. In fact, an order of 75,000 BEV trucks was estimated to cost an extra $2.3 billion compared to a 10% BEV fleet.

The Final Environmental Impact Statement (EIS) for NGDV procurement, published in January 2022, concluded the preferred alternative was "to purchase and deploy up to 90 percent ICE [internal combustion engine] NGDV with at least 10 percent BEV NGDV." The EIS evaluated four alternative scenarios:

- 10% ICE NGDV and 90% BEV NGDV
- 100% BEV NGDV
- 100% right-hand drive [RHD] commercial off-the-shelf [COTS] ICE vehicles, such as the Mercedes Metris currently in use
- 100% left-hand drive [LHD] COTS BEVs, using the Ford E-Transit as an exemplar

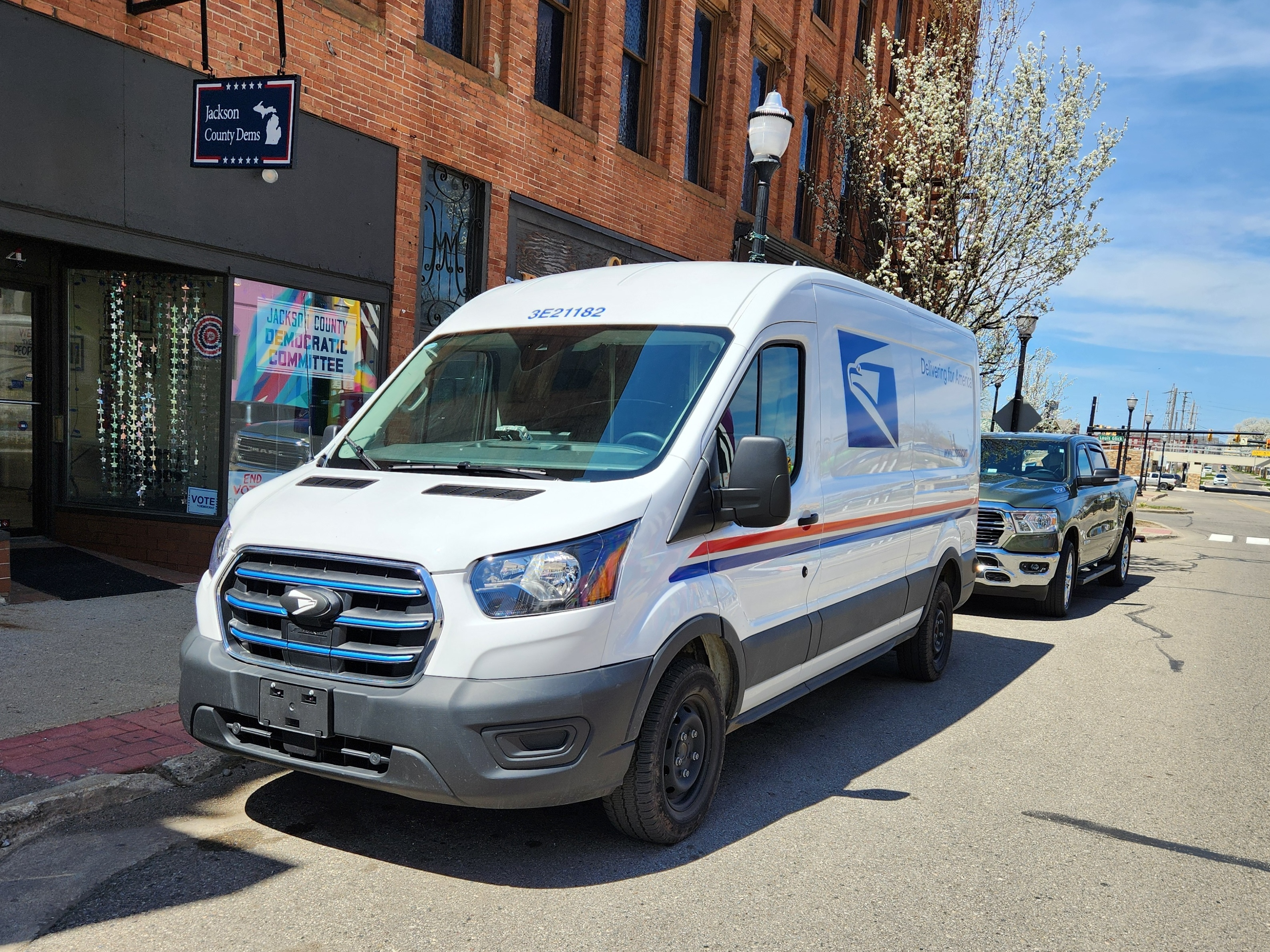
The Ford E-Transit, another vehicle evaluated as a commercial off-the-shelf alternative

According to the EIS, it would cost $11.6 billion to implement a 100% BEV NGDV fleet, $3.3 billion more than the split 10% BEV / 90% ICE NGDV fleet alternative. At approximately the same time, President Joe Biden issued Executive Order 14057 in December 2021, which mandated that all light-duty vehicles purchased for U.S. government fleets must be BEVs starting in fiscal year 2027, and by 2035, all new federal fleet vehicle procurements, including heavy-duty trucks, must be BEVs. One critic noted the incremental amount to implement an all-BEV NGDV fleet, while onerous, was relatively small in relation to other government projects and would reduce carbon emissions by 537,000 t (592,000 short tons) in tailpipe emissions. Researchers at the University of Michigan's School for Environment and Sustainability found the EIS underestimated lifetime emissions associated with the split 10/90 NGDV scenario, and overestimated lifetime emissions associated with the all-BEV NGDV scenario, providing even greater benefits for pursuing the all-electric procurement.

In February 2022, the EPA criticized the preferred alternative, stating the EIS "fails to consider more environmentally protective feasible alternatives and inadequately considers impacts on communities with environmental justice concerns." In addition, although analyses demonstrated that 95% of its routes could be electrified, considering the nominal 70 mi (110 km) range of the BEV NGDVs, just 10% of NGDVs would be procured as BEVs. Despite the criticism, USPS and Oshkosh announced that it would proceed with the preferred alternative: only 10% (5,000) of the initial order of Oshkosh NGDVs will be manufactured as BEVs, while the remaining 90% of the NGDV fleet will be manufactured as low-emission ICE vehicles.

The USPS and Oshkosh defended the NGDV procurement plan, noting that ICE-powered versions have been designed to be converted to BEV powertrains if required. However, Senators Ed Markey and Martin Heinrich, joined by other members of Congress and environmental organizations, sent a letter in February 2022 criticizing USPS and Oshkosh following the implementation of the preferred alternative, singling out the vehicles' inefficiency and the use of incorrect data in their environmental impact statement. Other groups joining the criticism included the EPA, the Biden Administration, Zero Emission Transportation Association, climate activists, and the Congressional Progressive Caucus of the Democratic Party, collectively criticizing Oshkosh and the United States Postal Service for ignoring Executive Order 14057 and proceeding with the 10/90 split procurement.

The proportion of BEV NGDVs in the initial order of 50,000 was increased to 20% in March 2022. Lawsuits were filed in April 2022 against the USPS by 16 states, six non-profit groups, the Bay Area Air Quality Management District, the District of Columbia, and the city of New York, demanding a more stringent environmental review or changing the proportion of BEV NGDVs to 100%. During the May 2022 National Post Forum, the USPS confirmed that it will increase the number of BEV NGDVs in the initial order. This means that at least 10,019 NGDV vehicles will be manufactured as BEVs.

In July 2022, USPS revised the initial order to now have at least 50% of the NGDV vehicles to be manufactured as BEVs. The Inflation Reduction Act allocated an additional $3 billion for the electrification of the NGDV fleet. In December 2022, USPS announced that 75% of its initial order of 60,000 NGDVs would be BEVs. By 2026, all new NGDVs ordered will be delivered as BEVs. In March 2023, Florida-based EV charger manufacturer Blink Charging Co. announced it was awarded an IDIQ (indefinite delivery/indefinite quantity) contract for up to 41,500 chargers.

=== Delayed delivery ===
Preproduction versions were shown at the Consumer Electronics Show in Las Vegas for 2022 and again for 2023, where attendees could participate in "Operation On-The-Move", a three-player competitive video game to deliver packages.

As reported by Reuters in May 2023, initial deliveries were delayed from 2023 to June 2024. USPS has committed to acquire 66,000 electric vehicles through 2028, of which 45,000 are NGDVs and 9,250 are Ford E-Transit vans. The E-Transit vans were scheduled to arrive by the end of 2023.

In August 2024, the first NGDV vehicles were delivered and began operating delivery routes in Athens, Georgia.

== Design ==
=== Overview ===
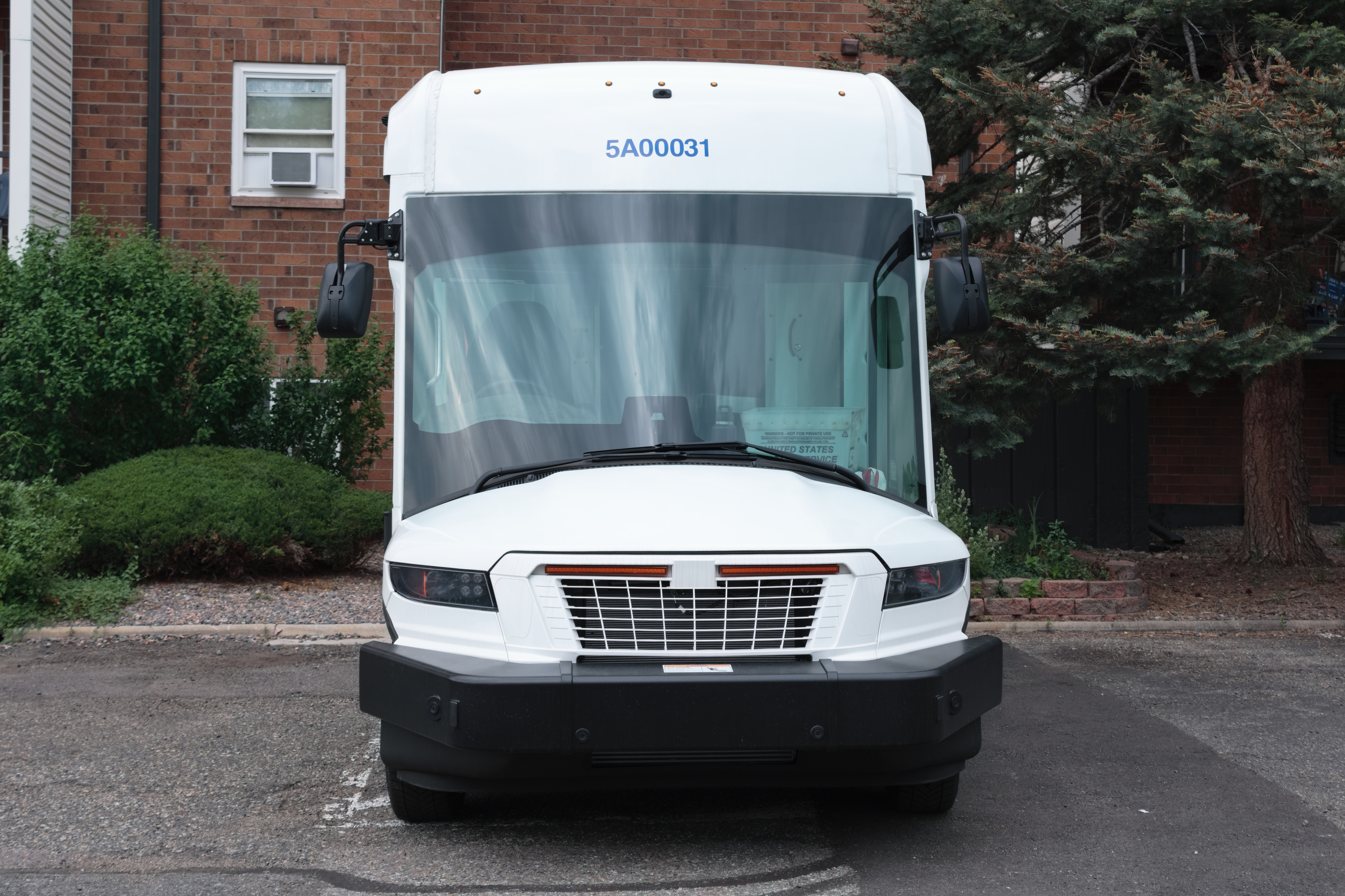
Front view of an NGDV, showing the height and windshield

Described as the 'duck-billed option', Oshkosh's NGDV has been designed to maximize interior volume and outward visibility for drivers who will be required to move against traffic in pedestrian-heavy areas. It is also tall enough for a person to stand inside and work. Current-generation automotive safety features employed by the design include airbags, a 360-degree camera, automatic emergency braking, and collision avoidance systems. The sliding door cab is air-conditioned.

The contract calls for a minimum order of 50,000 NGDVs, with options for up to 165,000, delivered over a 10-year period; the first NGDVs were scheduled to enter service in 2023. Initially, USPS announced that 5,000 vehicles in the first order will be battery-electric, the remainder using an internal combustion engine. The proportion of all-electric NGDVs being ordered has increased since then in response to sharp criticism of the original plan.

=== Drivetrain ===
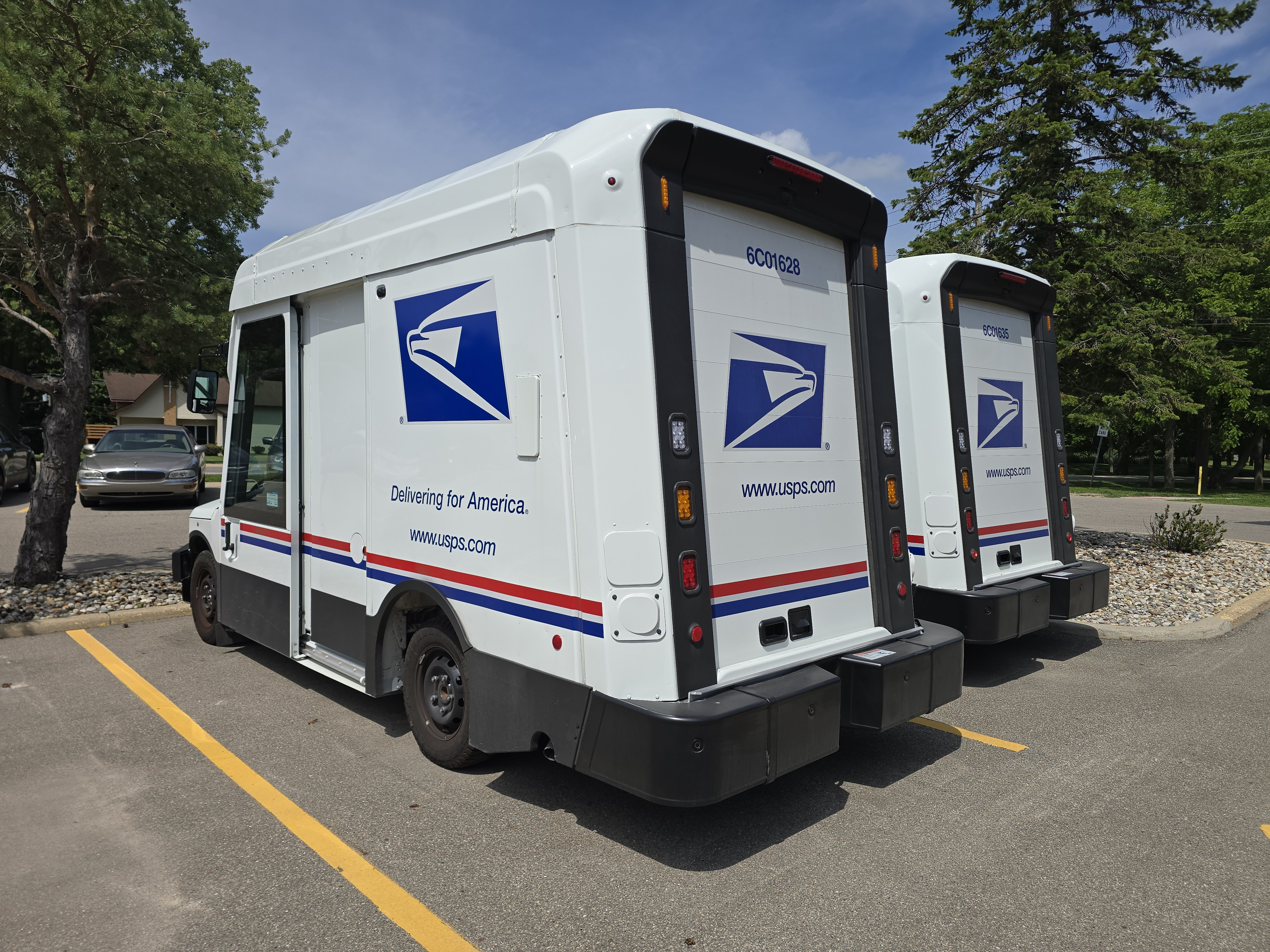
Two gasoline-powered NGDVs in Chelsea, Michigan

There are four planned variants: either an internal combustion engine (ICE) or battery-electric vehicle (BEV) powertrain, both of which will have options for either two- (2WD) or four-wheel (4WD) drive. The 2WD ICE model will have 4,112 purchased parts; the 4WD ICE model has 3,995 parts in common with the 2WD ICE model, while BEV variants have 3,297 and 3,196 parts in common with the 2WD ICE for the 2WD and 4WD BEV models, respectively.

Either powertrain option can be built for future orders, and models with an ICE can be converted to battery-electric if required. Ford has been announced as the drivetrain subsystem supplier, including engines, traction motors, and transmissions. Ford Component Sales also will provide Oshkosh with key parts for suspensions and other components, including cabin interiors. The earlier Oshkosh prototype evaluated during testing was based on the Ford Transit van.

The ICE will be a Ford EcoBoost 2.0L turbocharged 4-cylinder gasoline engine. At CES 2022, the video display accompanying the NGDV display showed specifications for the EcoBoost and 8-speed automatic transmission that will be used in the ICE-drivetrain variant. The EcoBoost has a peak output of 250 hp (190 kW) at 5,500 RPM and 275 lb⋅ft (373 N⋅m) at 3,000 RPM, but this was de-rated to 206 lb⋅ft (279 N⋅m) for reliability.

The electric variant has a Bosch-sourced eAxle drive unit and a 94 kW-hr lithium-ion battery using nickel-manganese-cobalt chemistry. The eAxle drive unit is a traction motor with an integrated reduction gearbox and inverter. The permanent magnet AC traction motor has a peak output of 150 kW (200 hp) and a continuous output of 70 kW (94 hp); power is supplied to the wheels through the gearbox with an 11.8:1 ratio. The inverter uses silicon IGBT circuitry.

==== Fuel economy and range ====
The ICE variant has an estimated fuel efficiency of 14.7 mpg_{‑US} (16.0 L/100 km), decreasing to 8.6 mpg_{‑US} (27 L/100 km) when the air conditioning is on. For comparison, the earlier LLV (built 1987–94) and FFV (2000–01) have an average observed fuel consumption of 8.2 and 6.9 mpg_{‑US} (29 and 34 L/100 km), respectively. The minuscule improvement in fuel economy was criticized by the United States Environmental Protection Agency (EPA) in February 2022.

The BEV variant has an estimated range of 70 mi (110 km) and a computed consumption of 1.34 kW⋅h/mi (25.2 mpg‑e). Although using the air conditioner was not expected to affect the range, using the heater was expected to reduce range by up to half. Based on the typical distance driven, it was assumed that only 20% of the battery state of charge would be used each day for most NGDVs; analysis of USPS mail carrier routes demonstrated the all-electric variant's range could accommodate 95% of all routes.

=== Dimensions and capacities ===
A prototype shown at CES 2022 was 9.5 ft (2.9 m) tall, 19.6 ft (6.0 m) long, and 7 ft (2.1 m) wide. The rear cargo opening measures 49.5 in (1,260 mm) wide and 72.5 in (1,840 mm) tall.

The gross vehicle weight rating of the NGDV with an ICE, including payload, is 8,501 lb (3,856 kg), just one pound over the EPA's threshold to be considered a heavy-duty truck, allowing it to avoid more stringent pollution emissions and efficiency standards for light-duty trucks. The estimated curb weight of the NGDV is 5,560 lb (2,520 kg) for the version with a conventional ICE and 6,670 lb (3,030 kg) for the battery-electric vehicle (BEV) variant. The payload of the vehicles also varies slightly, either 2,941 lb (1,334 kg) for the ICE or 2,207 lb (1,001 kg) for the BEV.

=== Safety features ===
The NGDV is equipped with a second sliding curbside door that allows the mail carrier to enter the cargo area directly, allowing them to avoid having to stand in the street while loading and unloading the vehicle. As another measure for safety, the NGDV has an automatic parking brake that engages when the vehicle is shifted to park, when the driver leaves the seat, or when the ignition is shut off; it disengages when the vehicle is started and then shifted to drive or reverse, and the vehicle ignition is operable only when the transmission is in park or neutral. The front and rear bumpers are equipped with proximity sensors that start beeping intermittently when objects are detected within 8 ft (2.4 m), and switch to continuous alarming when objects are within 6 in (150 mm).

== Reception ==
The NGDV was met with generally positive reviews from postal workers, many of whom noted that the addition of the air conditioning improved working conditions in the Deep South. Car and Driver writer Ezra Dyer and several postal workers noted the vehicle's unconventional appearance, with Dyer comparing it to a "robot Beluga whale—built by the East German government".
