= Research consortium =

Collaboration between researchers

A research consortium, also known as research consortia, is a collaborative structure that connects individuals and organizations to pursue shared research objectives, operating under a formal governance and operational framework.

== Overview ==
Research consortia typically involves multiple research projects and may include various consortia, directed by management committees, advisory bodies, and data access panels.

The main objective of a consortium is to facilitate collaboration among a diverse group of stakeholders. Benefits of consortium participation include access to specialized funding, opportunities for interaction with other institutions, and connections with industry and government bodies. In addition, consortia often allow members early access to research results and data, which can be advantageous in areas such as patent licensing and academic cooperation.

Unlike other forms of research collaboration, consortia are characterized by their requirement for regular progress reporting and the production of deliverables, leading to a more regulated and consistent approach to research.

== By country or region ==
=== European Union ===
In the European Union, consortia are a fundamental aspect of collaborative research, especially in programs such as Horizon Europe, which is a €95.5 billion research and innovation funding initiative for 2021–2027.
