= CGI Group (Europe) Ltd. v HMRC =

2010 United Kingdom legal case

CGI Group (Europe) Ltd v HMRC
- Court: First-tier Tribunal (Tax)
- Full case name: CGI Group (Europe) Limited v The Commissioners for Her Majesty's Revenue and Customs
- Decided: 2 September 2010
- Citation: [2010] UKFTT 396 (TC)

Case history
- Prior action: Appeal against HMRC's VAT assessments on IT outsourcing fees

Court membership
- Judge sitting: Tribunal Judge Colin Bishopp

The VAT Tribunal case of CGI Group (Europe) Limited v HMRC ([2010] UKFTT 396 (TC)) is a United Kingdom legal case which addressed the VAT treatment of a joint employment arrangement in the context of outsourcing services.

When two practices jointly employ a member of staff, one employer can pay the employees their wage first, then the other employer can pass the money back to them without VAT as it is not considered to be a transaction. However, this decision shows that the arrangements may give rise to an unexpected VAT liability for joint contracts of employment.

== Case information ==
The tribunal met on 26, 27 and 29 July 2010.

The case of CGI Group (Europe) Limited demonstrated that, where an arrangement is structured in order to obtain a particular VAT treatment, it is important to ensure both the contractual documentation and the substance and reality of the arrangement support this treatment. Cox, an insurance company, outsourced the running of its IT department to CGI. Under the outsourcing arrangements with CGI, the staffs became jointly employed by both Cox and CGI and a master services agreement was also made between them. As Cox was an insurance company it had (like many other financial institutions) a limited ability to recover input VAT incurred on fees paid for outsourcing services. CGI believed that the money paid for the shared wages would be excluded from VAT as the employees were under a joint employment contract. There were also a number of detailed arrangements regarding the employees under the master services agreement, including that CGI agreed not to take certain actions in relation to the transferred employees for a period of six months and to indemnify Cox in respect of all liabilities relating to them from the transfer date.

== The decision ==
Even though the Tribunal judge accepted that legally the employees were jointly employed by CGI and Cox, the staff in reality were working for CGI only. CGI had a high degree of control of the employees and this overrode the joint employment contract. Cox still had a right to control the employees. Therefore the VAT was expected to be paid in full.

From this case, the employers should to be more cautious under joint employment circumstances, including the terms on the agreement and the arrangement of an employee between two employers, in order to minimize the risk of VAT being applied. It is also a reminder that the courts will look beyond the contract to decide the correct VAT analysis.
