= Mail truck =

Vehicle for transportation of mail

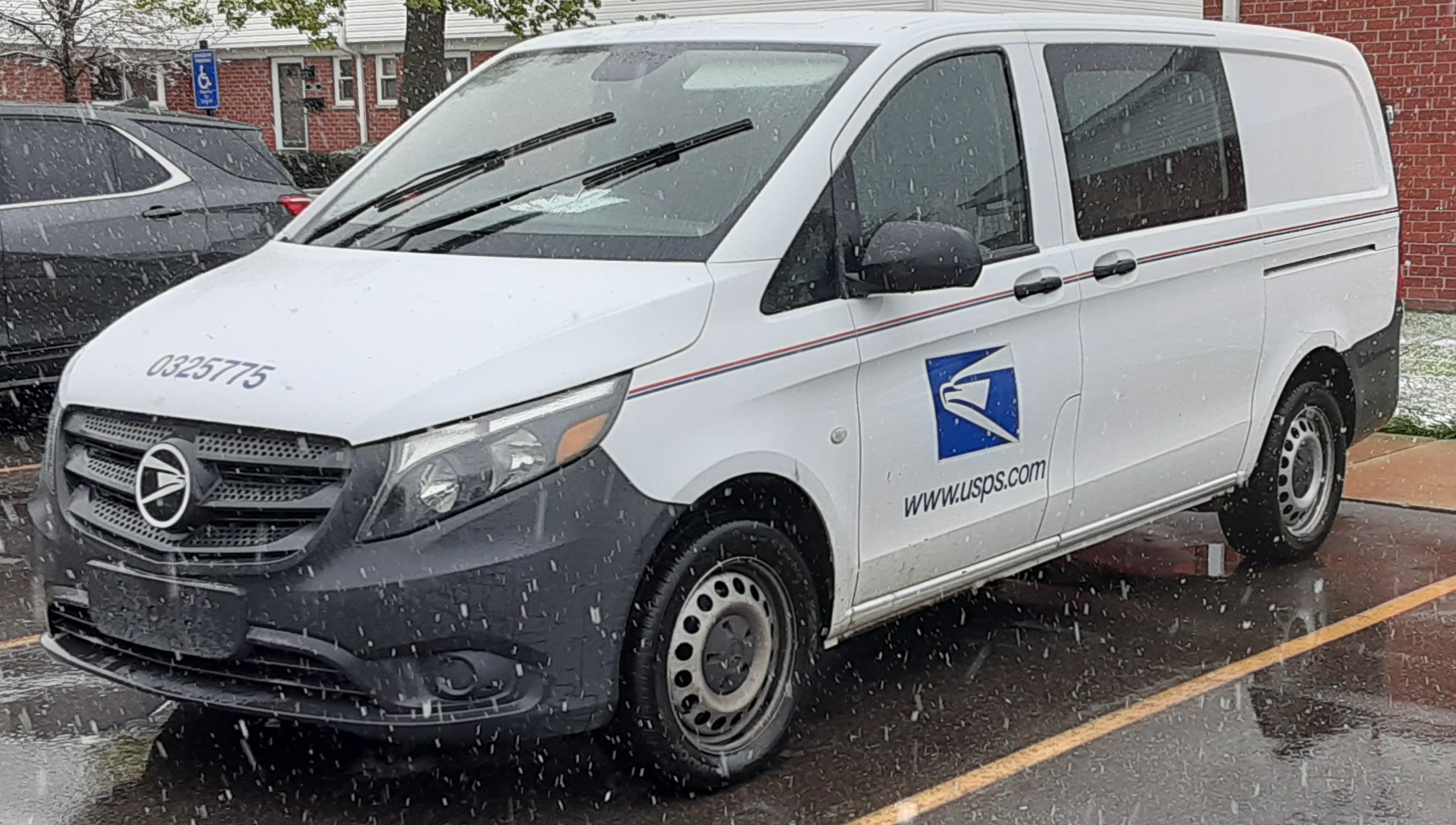
USPS Mercedes-Benz Metris delivery van parked in Taylor, Michigan

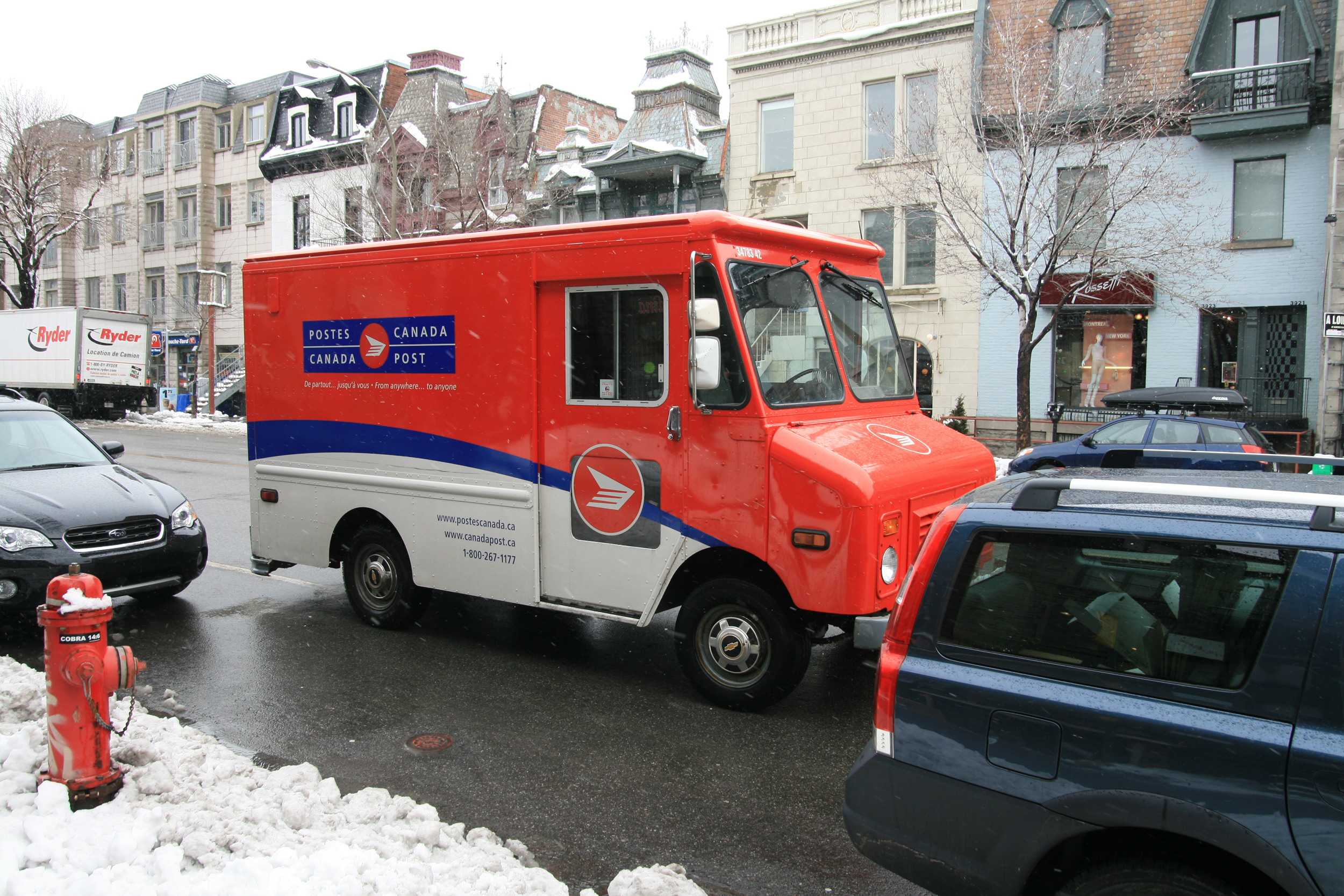
Canada Post large van

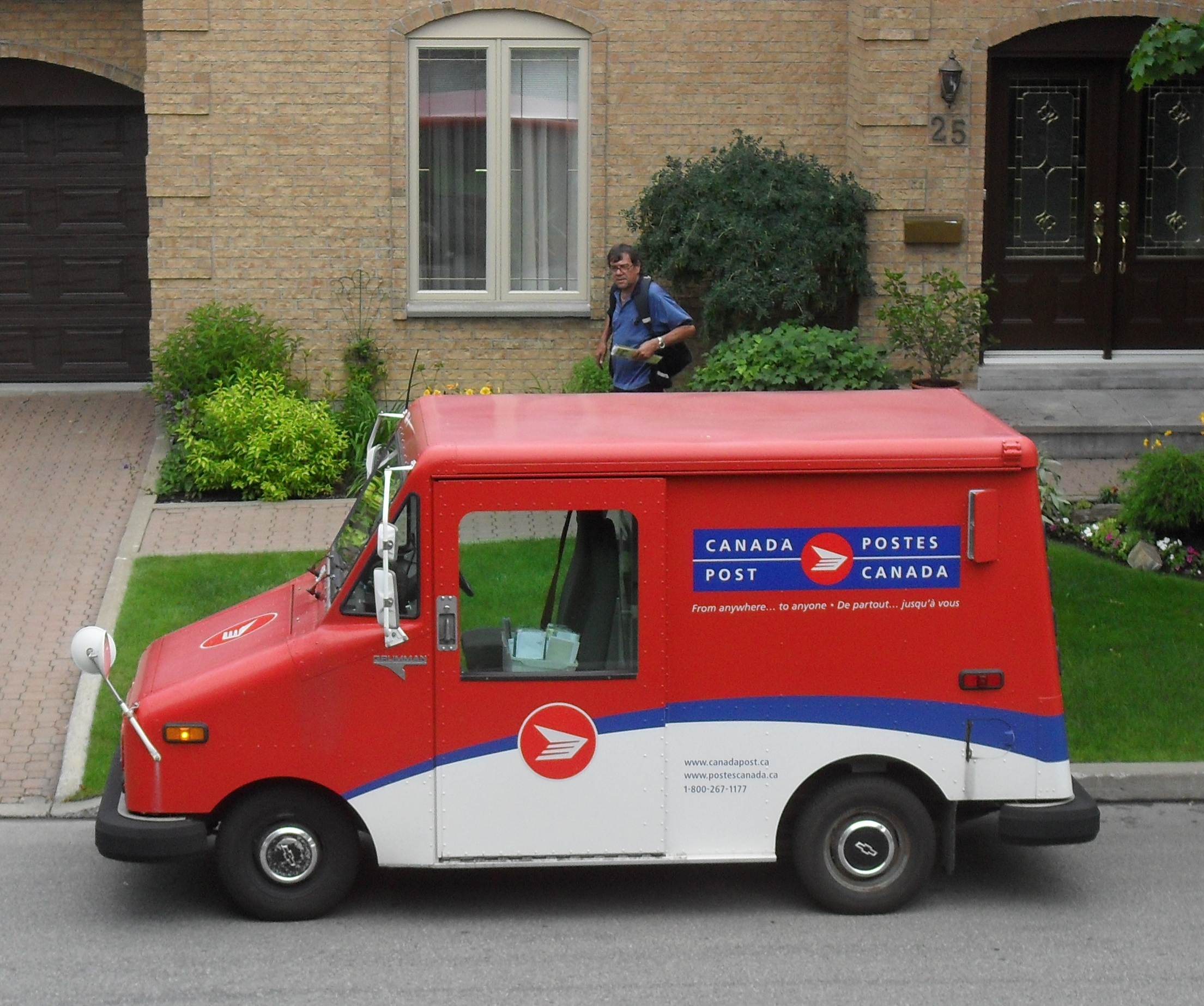
Canada Post LLV

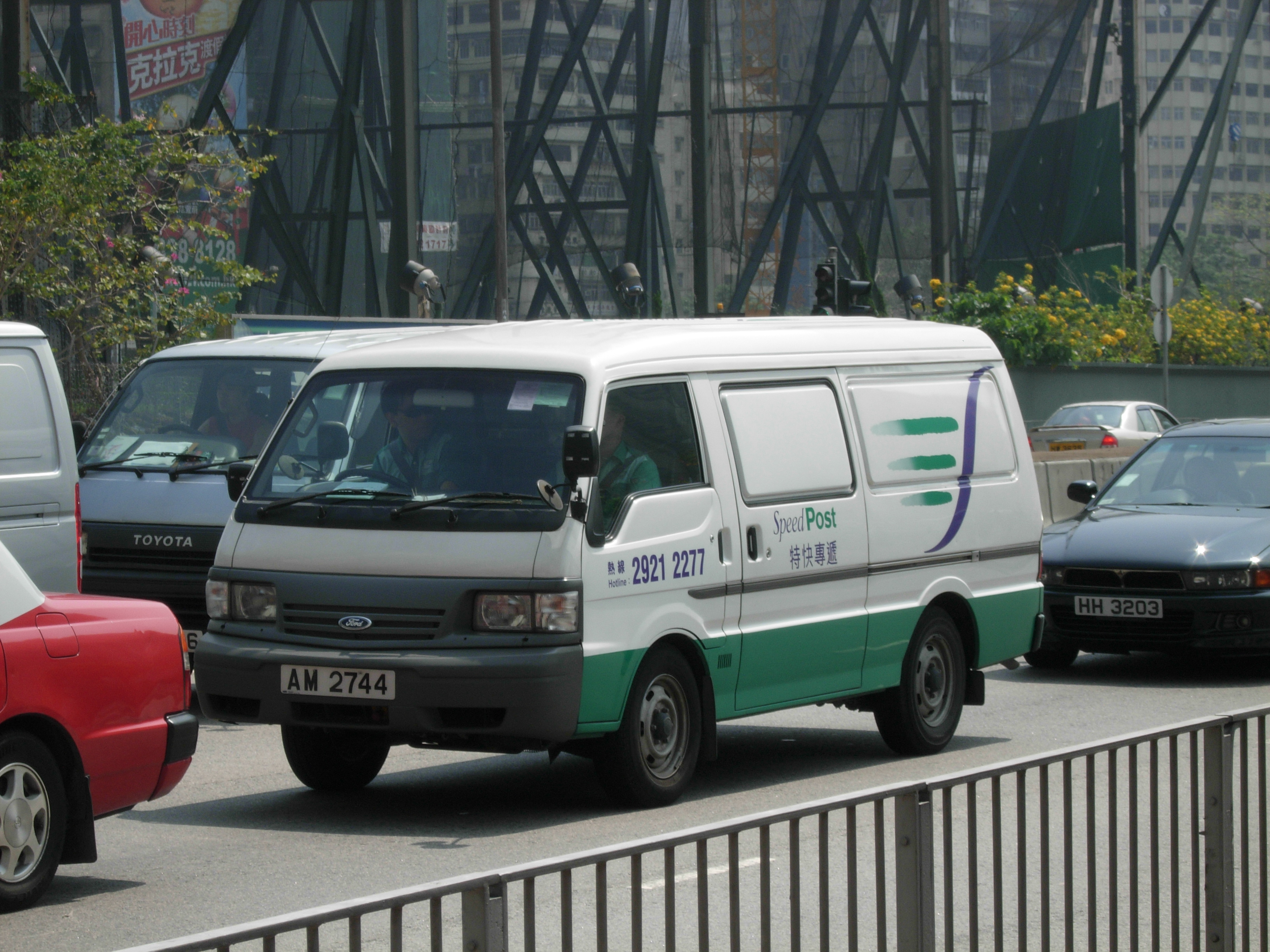
Hongkong Post SpeedPost van

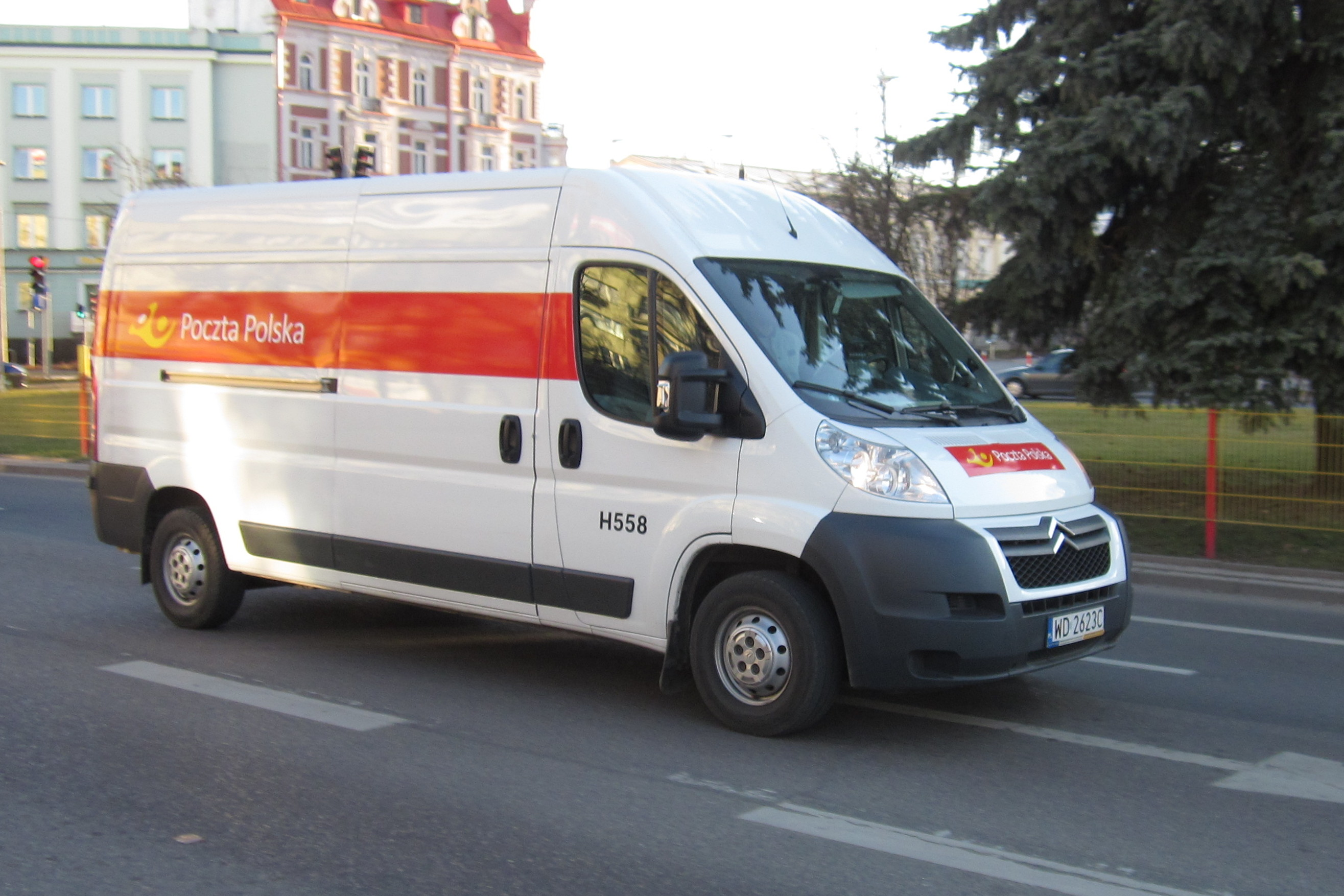
Mail van of Polish Post in Białystok

A mail truck or post van is a type of delivery vehicle that is used to transport post. Originally horse-drawn, most modern mail trucks are automotive vehicles.

== Evolution ==
In his article, "Right through the Post", John Hollingshead describes mail vans from the point of view of a letter navigating through the postal system:

Here we find [...] many really dismal, but rather would-be gay-looking, vehicles, drawn up to convey us to our different railway stations. These are the Post-office vans, furnished and horsed by contract, to the department, for a payment of ten thousand pounds per annum; and forming the only existing link that binds the railway-governed Post-office mail box; of to-day, to the mail-coach-governed Post-office of the past.

In shape, the Post-office van is like a prison-van; in colour it is a mixture of dingy black and red; and in condition it is dreadfully shattered and work-worn. Something of the hearse also mingles in its composition, and something of the omnibus. Its stand, when off duty, is at the end of Bedford-row, Holborn, where it basks in the sun, within a maze of posts, against the dead wall, looking with its companions like a crooked line of Chelsea pensioners waiting for the doctor.

As described by Hollingshead, mail vans in the United Kingdom were originally horse-drawn, operating in conjunction with the railway network, including Travelling Post Offices, carrying mail between railway stations and places distant from them, and between sub-post offices and sorting offices. Some of these vans were of the Brougham type. In the 1880s the General Post Office began hiring larger enclosed box vans from McNamara & Company. These vans had elliptical spring front suspension, semi-elliptical spring rear suspension, a double driving seat, and mail coach style headlamps. These were frequently called mail coaches, although unlike actual mail coaches they carried no passengers. At least six regular long-distance, i.e., not just to and from local railway stations, mail van services out of London existed in the late 19th century. A London-to-Chatham mail van service ran until the summer of 1908, and one mail van service ran from London to Oxford until 1909.

During World War II such horse-drawn McNamara mail vans were reintroduced, because of petrol rationing, but only for local work. These vans were drawn by a single horse, had pneumatic tyres, and were painted in the Post Office livery colours. A few of them were still in service in the early 1950s.

Horse-drawn mail vans were replaced by automotive mail vans. These were commercial vans. For example, over almost two decades the U.K. General Post Office purchased 50,000 Morris Minor light commercial vehicles for use as either mail vans or telephone engineer vans. These Morris Minor vans became a familiar sight, and at least one survived until 1982 to sport the livery of British Telecom. The GPO vehicles were special order vehicles, and not quite the same as the commercial Morris Minor LCVs. The early series vans had one seat, no heater, and headlamps fitted to the front of the vehicle on rubber wings (US: fenders). Later series adhered more closely to conventional LCV norms, but differences remained. The Series III GPO Morris Minor van, for example, had a Yale lock on the driver's door.

Similarly, in the United States automotive mail vans used by the United States Postal Service were modified commercial vehicles. From June 1929 to March 1932, for example, the Ford Motor Company sold Model A and Model AA chassis to the USPS, whose regional garages would then outfit them with mail van bodies (in oak or white ash) painted in the USPS colors. These bodies came from five companies: the York-Hoover Body Company, of York, Pennsylvania; the Mifflinburg Body Company, of Mifflinburg, Pennsylvania; the August Schubert Wagon Works, of Syracuse, New York; the Metropolitan Body Company, of Bridgeport, Connecticut; and the General Motors Truck Company, of Pontiac, Michigan. In total, 400 such mail vans were built on the 1929 Model A chassis, 400 on the 1929 Model AA chassis, 1,000 on the 1931 Model A chassis, and 2,500 on the 1931 Model AA chassis. One such 1931 Ford Model A mail van can be seen exhibited in the National Postal Museum in Washington, D.C. The first door to door mail truck was manufactured by the Twin Coach Company of Kent, Ohio, in 1954. It was first used by the Warren, Ohio, Post Office 4 August 1954, under Postmaster Sam Verlenich who posed with five carriers next to their trucks, for the historic photograph on the front page of the Warren Tribune Chronicle.

The mail van used by the USPS for local deliveries since the late-1980s is the Grumman LLV (Long Life Vehicle). This is a custom-made mail van manufactured by Grumman Corporation, whose US$1.1 billion contract with the USPS was for 99,150 vehicles in 1986. They were originally intended to last for 24 years, three times the lifetime of the mail vans that they replaced. Production of the LLV began in April 1987 in Grumman's plant in Montgomery, Pennsylvania. The vehicle is built on a General Motors chassis, is 175 inches (440 cm) long, weighs 3,000 pounds (1,400 kg), can carry up to 1,000 pounds (450 kg) of mail, and is driven by a 2.5-litre General Motors four-cylinder engine. In 1991, Grumman was awarded a further US$555 million contract for a further 43,500 vehicles.

General Motors also went about reselling some Saturn S-Series wagon models as postal vehicles following poor sales and over-production for the Japanese market. The USPS, in need of right-hand-drive vehicles, occasionally bought RHD Saturn SW models, generally the single-cam SW1 model. The usage did not catch on for the most part, and nowadays the Saturn SWP-- a special designation used to refer to specifically the postal wagon-- is a purely consumer vehicle, having no application remaining in the postal service.

It is sometimes thought that a United States Postal Service mail truck has right of way over emergency vehicles; this is not true. Through the Postal Reorganization Act of 1970, Congress afforded the United States Postal Service broad powers of operation in the marketplace, excluding it from most Federal laws and regulations. This granted the USPS power to set its own policies for its vehicle identification and are not required to have license plates. Per USPS policy, if a vehicle has USPS branding, only unique numbering on the exterior of the vehicle is required.

=== Gallery ===
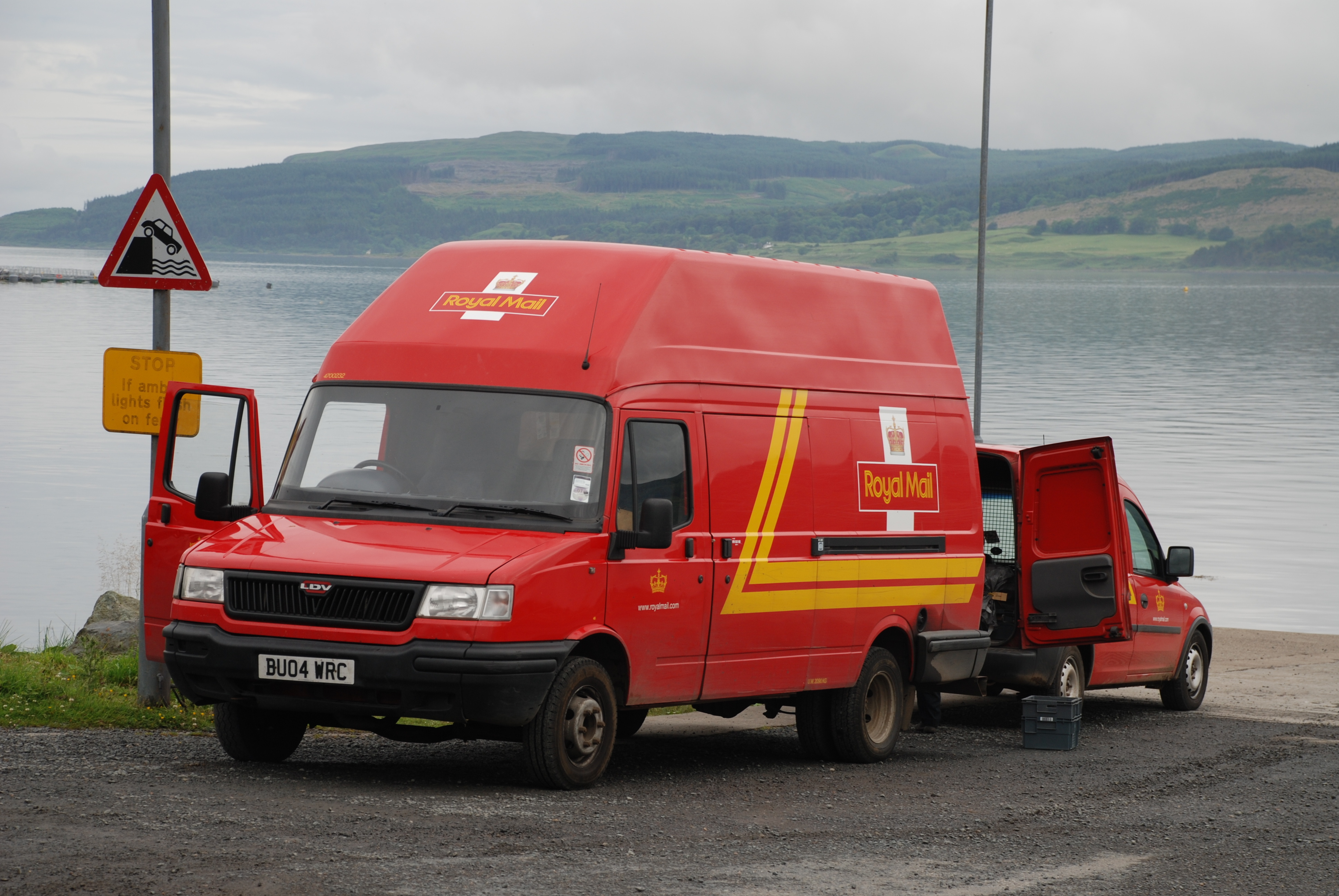
Modern Royal Mail vans

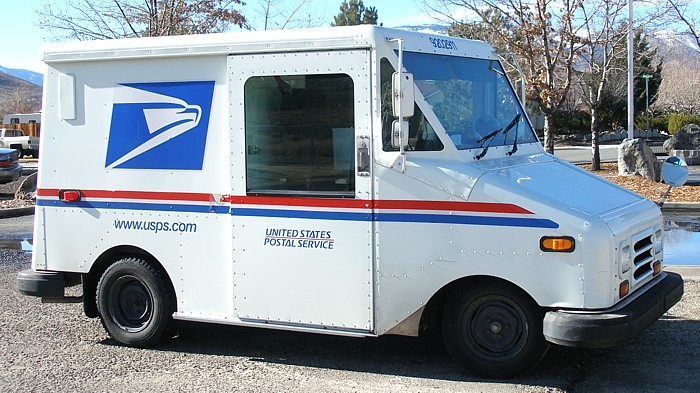
A USPS Grumman LLV mail truck

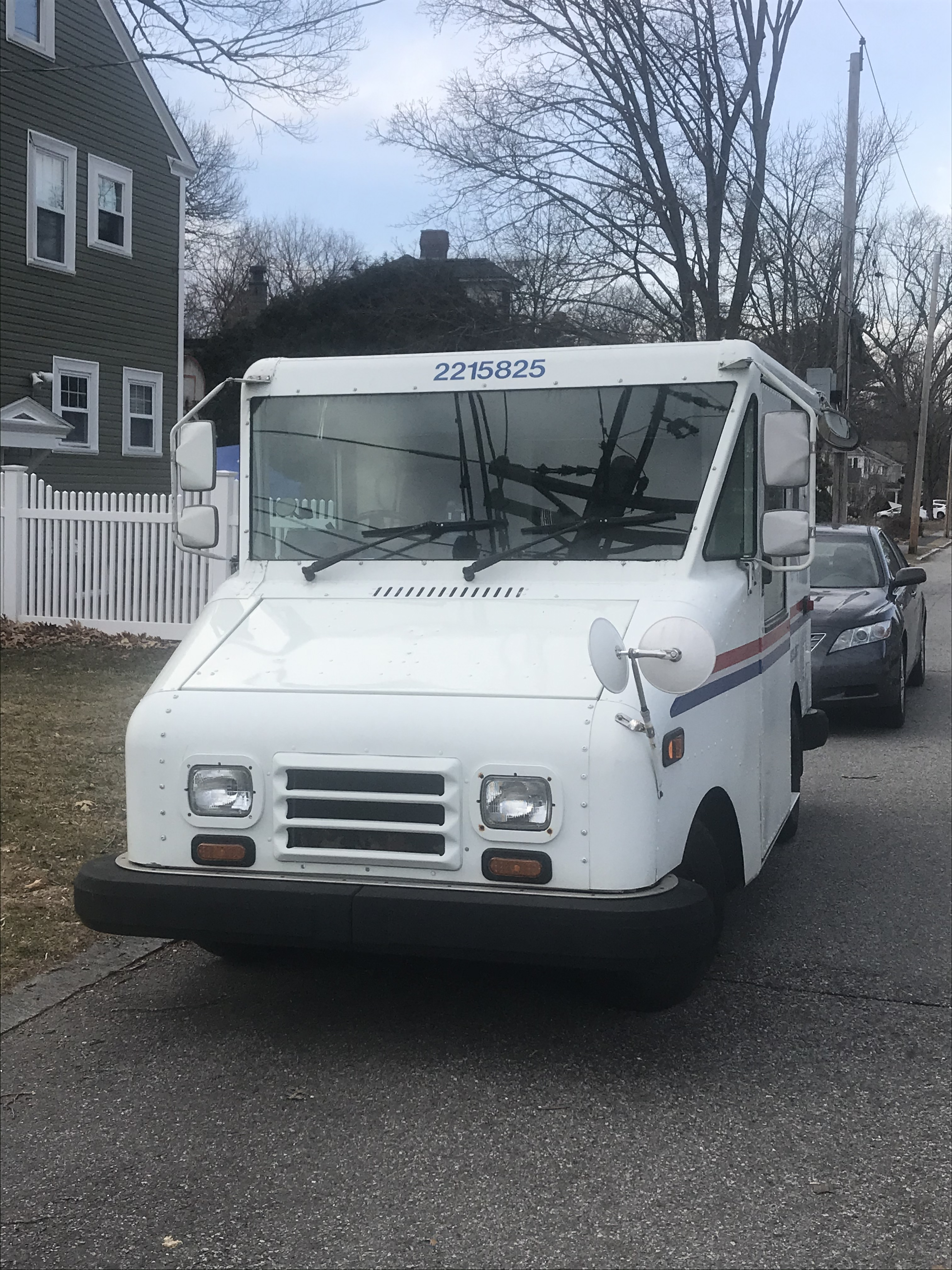
A USPS Grumman LLV in Massachusetts in January 2020

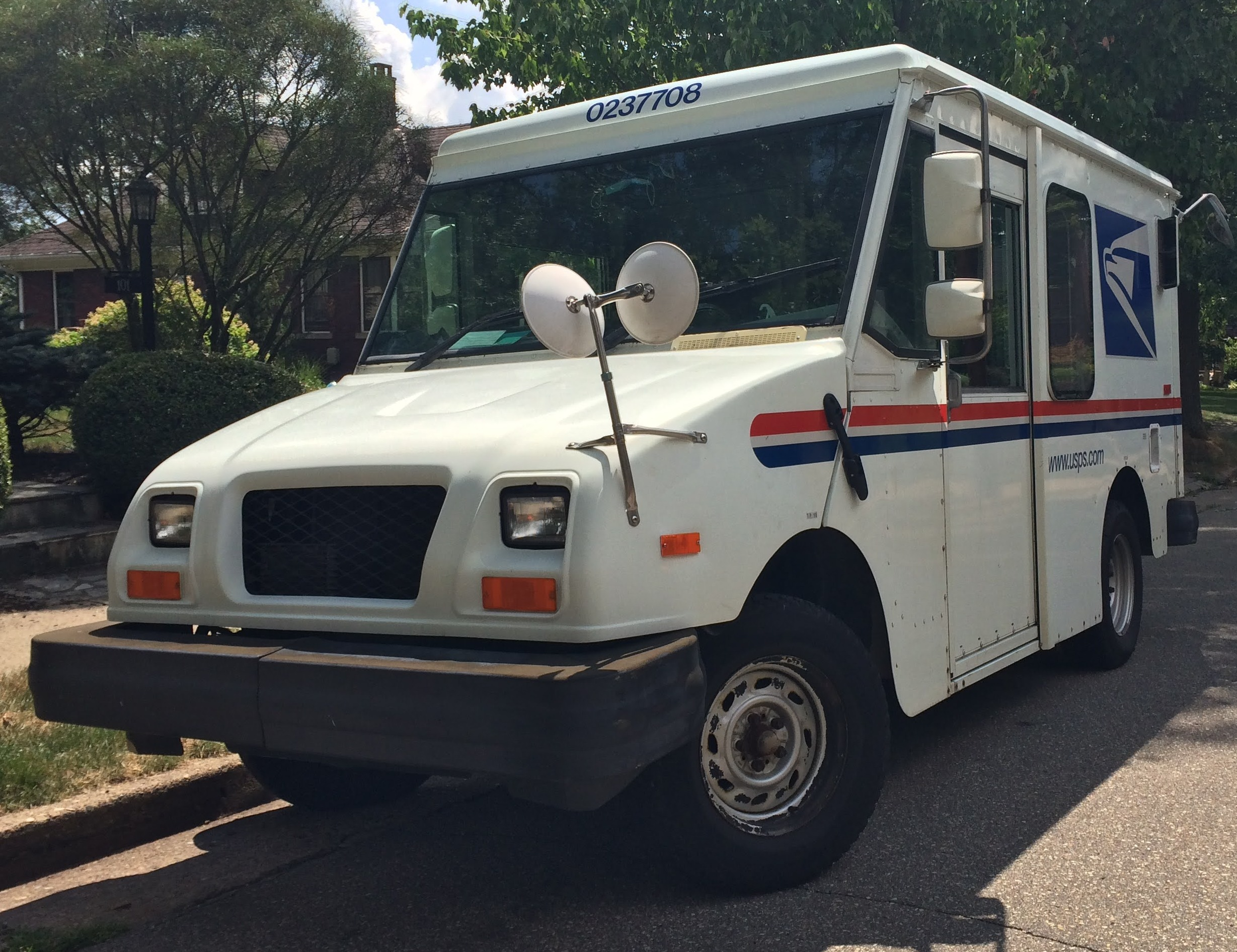
A 2000 Ford-Utilimaster FFV of the USPS, seen in Mount Lebanon, Pennsylvania, in August 2020

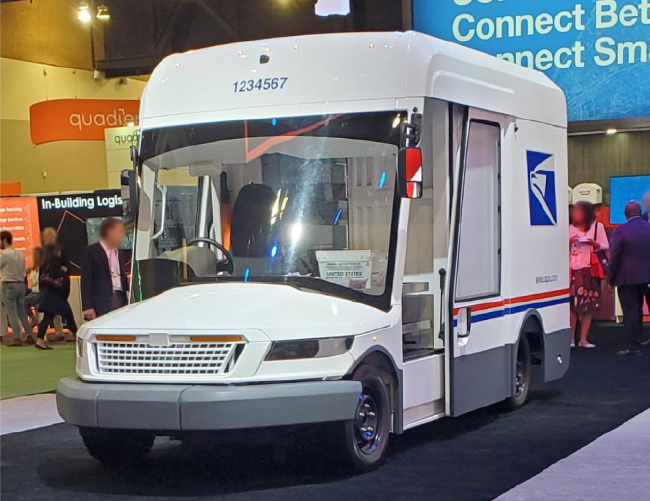
USPS Oshkosh Next Generation Delivery Vehicle at CES 2023

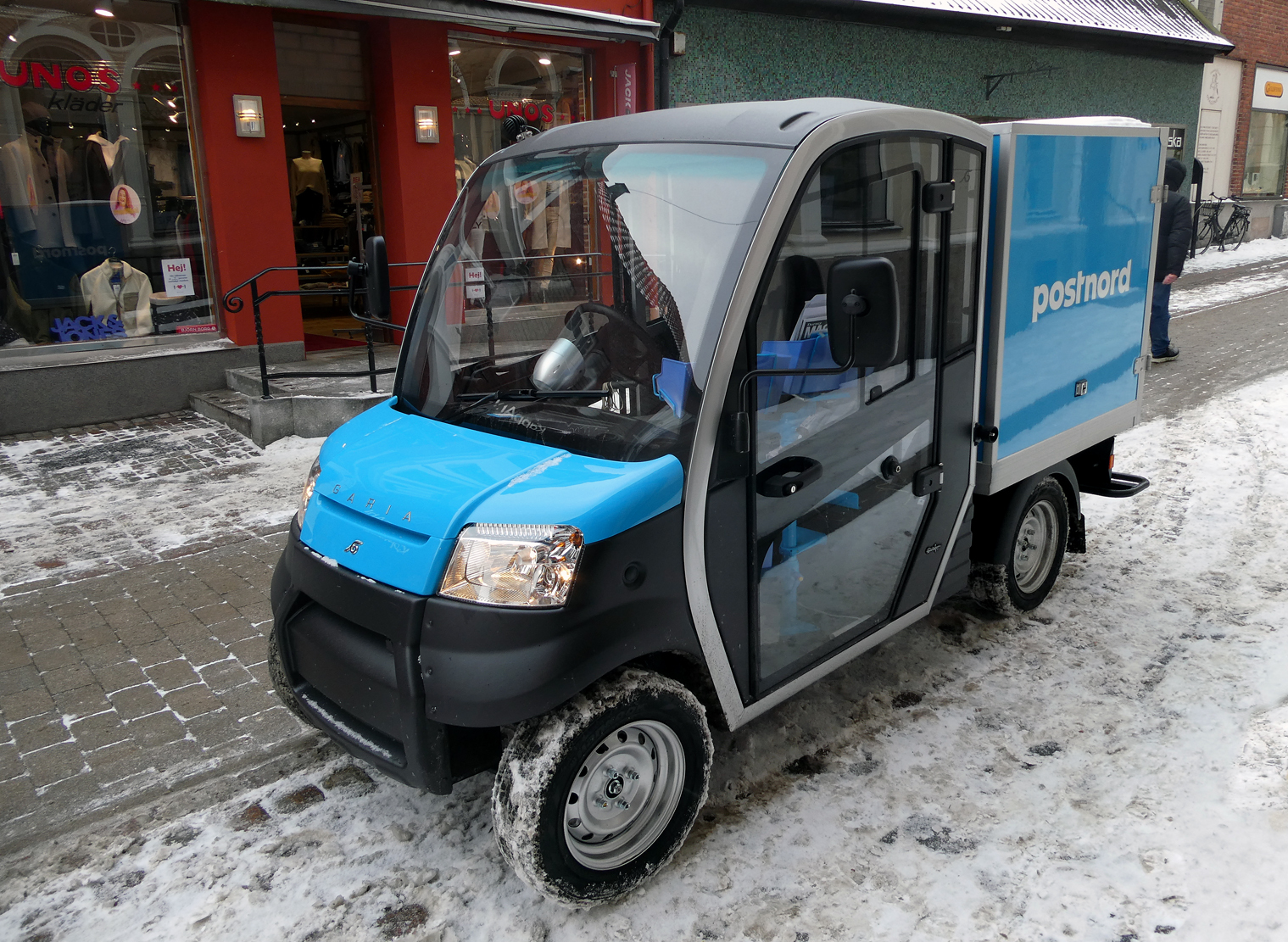
Electric mail van from Postnord in Ystad / Sweden 2021

A Royal Mail van seen in 2025

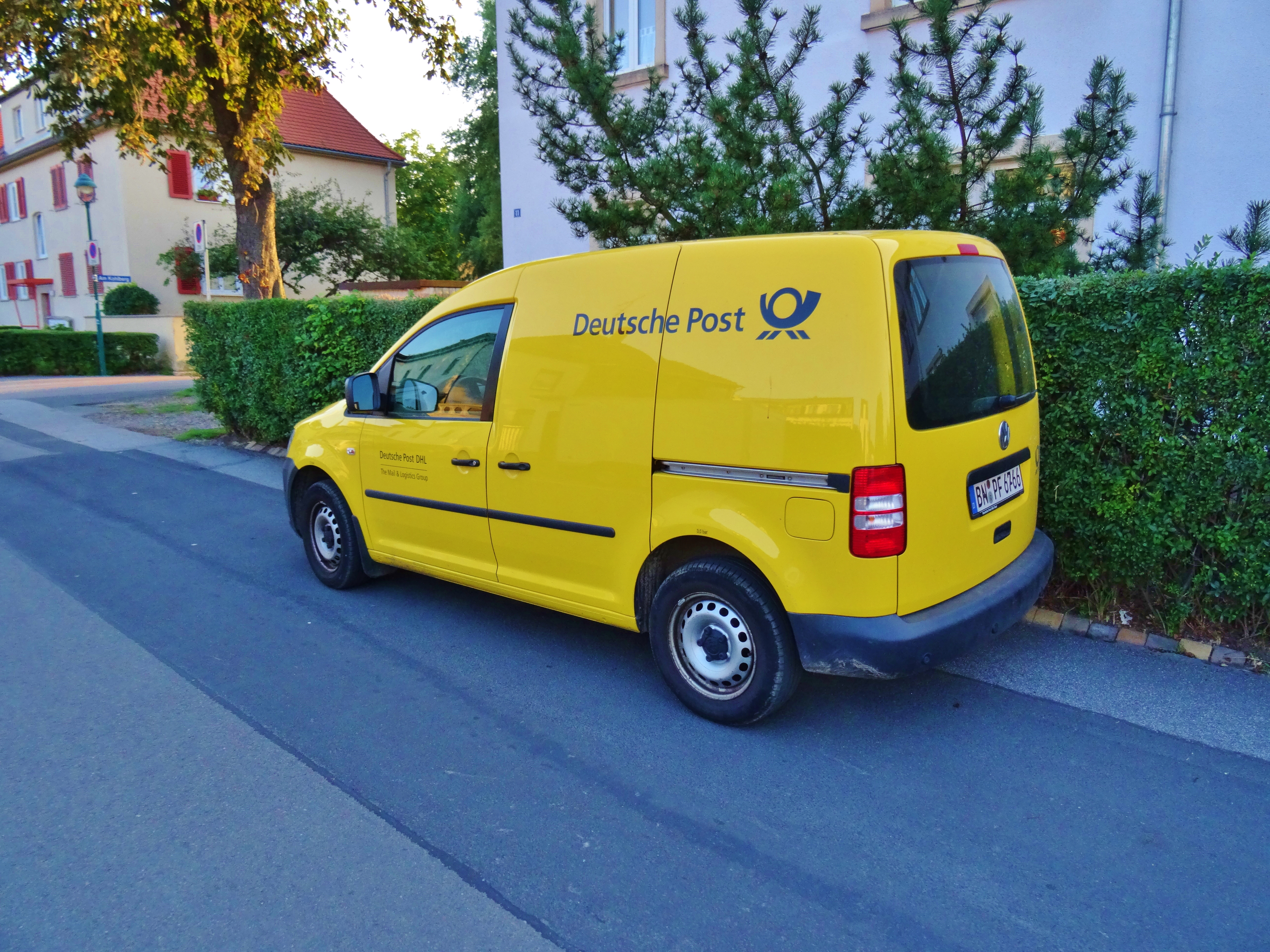
German post van (now DHL Group) in the traditional yellow

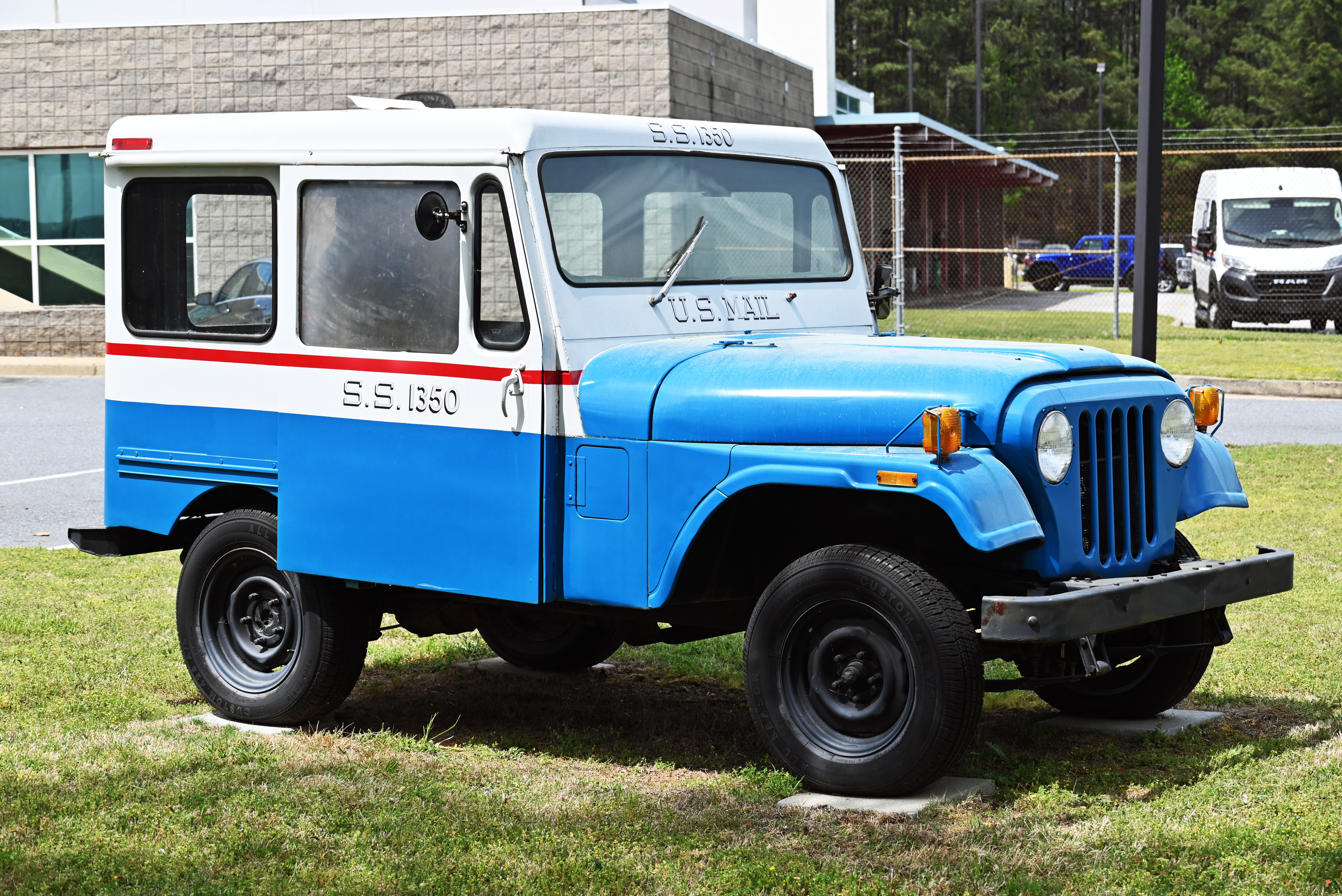
Old US Post Office truck, made by AM General
