= Statement of objectives =

The statement of objectives is one part of a request for proposal from the U.S. Government. The statement of objectives is an alternative to a government prepared statement of work (SOW). A SOO provides the government's overall objectives and the offeror's required support to achieve the contractual objectives. Offerors use the SOO as a basis for preparing a SOW which is then included as an integral part of the proposal which the government evaluates during the source selection.

This concept and approach was introduced with the 1996 Preparation of Statement of Work Handbook to support the underlying acquisition reform goals of "better, faster, cheaper" by allowing offerors maximum freedom to achieving the government objectives. This can be a means of furthering Acquisition Reform Strategies, such as Use of Performance Based Requirements, Use of Commercial Practices, and Reduced Cost of Ownership.

The SOO should be compatible with the needs statement, operational requirements, and the preliminary contract work breakdown structure.
