= Data item descriptions =

US Department of Defense document standard

A United States data item description (DID) is a completed document defining the data deliverables required of a United States Department of Defense contractor. A DID specifically defines the data content, format, and intended use of the data with a primary objective of achieving standardization objectives by the U.S. Department of Defense. The content and format requirements for DIDs are defined within MIL-STD-963C, Data Item Descriptions (2014).

== Terminology ==
The terminology of DIDs and the term contract data requirements list (CDRL) originated with US military procurements, and it is now often encountered in other large procurements that are modeled after the military procurement process. Within a military solicitation or contract, each DID is uniquely numbered to identify the data deliverables in terms of specific information such as: purpose, description, preparation instructions including a table of contents and descriptions of each section, and references to the Contract Statement of work (SOW).

Practices and terms where definition is given by MIL-STD-963:

- Tailoring of data requirements. The Contract data requirements list listing of the required DID may note deletion of the applicability of a portion of the data requirements as unnecessary to meet the needs of a specific contract. ('Tailoring' does not allow addition or alteration to the DID wording.)
- Format. The desired organization, structure, or arrangement of the content of the data product described by the DID. This term relates to the shape, size, makeup, style, physical organization, or arrangement of the data product described in the DID.
- Content. The desired subject(s), topic(s), or element(s) which constitutes the data product described in the DID (for example, a string of defined data elements for entry into a Government database; a listing of paragraph titles or topics for inclusion in a data deliverable) under general topics; or subject matter which may be further defined into sub-topics. For a specific contract, the content of a deliverable shall contain information that fulfills the requirements identified in the CDRL and the description of the DID. Documents should have section numbers and titles matching to the subsections of the DID content description for easier application and use.
- DID number: Each DID is assigned a unique three-part identifier by the DID approval authority. An example DID number for repetitive use is DI-SESS-80013B (DI- Data Item; SESS – four character code for the "Systems Engineering" Standardization Area [see "SD-1, Standardization Directory" for descriptions]; 80013 assigned by ASSIST Automated Document Number Module, and B the sequential version). An example DID number for one-time use is OT-13-1000 (OT- One Time; 13 – fiscal year issued; 10000 – the first number assigned in FY13 by the Army).

Since DID documents are what contract mechanics cause to be produced, the defined content guidelines and their terminologies are commonly referred to in United States Military Standards or other forms of procedural and administrative guidance of the United States Department of Defense.

== Usage in government contracts ==
Writers of a SOW often include requirements that belong in other parts of a contract. Specifically, quantitative technical requirements are addressed in the military specification and work requirements are specified in the SOW, and data requirements (e.g., delivery, format, and content) should be in the CDRL along with the appropriate DID to minimize the potential for conflict.
