= Master service agreement =

Framework agreement to support future contracts

A master service agreement (MSA), sometimes known as a framework agreement, is a contract reached between parties, in which the parties agree to most of the terms that will govern future transactions or future agreements.

A master agreement delineates a schedule of lower-level service agreements, permitting the parties to quickly enact future transactions or agreements, negotiating only the points specific to the new transactions and relying on the provisions in the master agreement for common terms. This master agreement can be used to mediate employer-employee conflict in the workplace by having a reference point to work out solutions and set specific terms.

Contracts are often negotiated as a unified master service agreement and statement of work, such as with information technology service providers.

== Purpose ==
There are two main reasons for using MSA:

1. To provide indemnification. It means that one company or party agrees to indemnify the other party against certain existing losses or any future losses. An indemnifying party is a party that agrees to indemnify any damages that it or any other party has caused or may cause at some point in the future. They engage their own lawyers and bear the legal costs associated with the litigation.
2. To allocate risks. This means using sophisticated strategies to identify potential risks and create a strategy to mitigate them.

MSA allows counterparties not to create new agreements for every action between parties because it creates a solid basis for negotiations and a reference point. So, the main functions of MSAs are the following:

- Outline governing contractual terms
- Allow for additional adjustments

== See also ==
- Contract management
- Project management
- Transactional law
- Service level agreement
