= Statement of work =

Document in project management

In project management, a statement of work (SOW) is a narrative description of a project's work requirement. It defines project-specific activities, deliverables and timelines for a vendor providing services to the client. The SOW typically also includes detailed requirements and pricing, with standard regulatory and governance terms and conditions. It is often an important accompaniment to a master service agreement or request for proposal (RFP).

== Overview ==
Many formats and styles of statement of work document templates have been specialized for the hardware or software solutions described in the request for proposal. Many companies create their own customized version of SOWs that are specialized or generalized to accommodate typical requests and proposals they receive. However, it is usually informed by the goals of the top management as well as input from the customer and/or user groups.

Note that in many cases the statement of work is a binding contract. Master service agreements or consultant/training service agreements postpone certain work-specific contractual components that are addressed in individual statements of work. The master service agreement serves as a master contract governing the terms over potentially multiple SOWs. Sometimes it refers to scope of work. For instance, if a project is done on contract, the scope statement included as part of it can be used as the SOW since it also outlines the work of the project in clear and concise terms.

== Areas addressed ==
A statement of work typically addresses these subjects.

- Purpose: Why are we doing this project? A purpose statement attempts to answer this.
- Scope of work: This describes the work to be done and specifies the hardware and software involved. The definition of scope becomes the scope statement.
- Location of work: This describes where the work is to be performed, including the location of hardware and software and where people will meet to do the work.
- Period of performance: This specifies the allowable time for projects, such as start and finish time, number of hours that can be billed per week or month, where work is to be performed and anything else that relates to scheduling.
- Deliverables schedule: This part lists and describes what is due and when.
- Applicable standards: This describes any industry specific standards that need to be adhered to in fulfilling the contract.
- Acceptance criteria: This specifies how the buyer or receiver of goods will determine if the product or service is acceptable, usually with objective criteria. See Acceptance testing.
- Special requirements: This specifies any special hardware or software, specialized workforce requirements, such as degrees or certifications for personnel, travel requirements, and anything else not covered in the contract specifics.
- Type of contract/payment schedule: The project acceptance will depend on if the budget available will be enough to cover the work required. Therefore, a breakdown of payments by whether they are up-front or phased will usually be negotiated in an early stage.
- Miscellaneous: Many items that are not part of the main negotiations may be listed because they are important to the project, and overlooking or forgetting them could pose problems for the project.

== United States government contracts ==
For US government service contracts, the use of SOWs remains strong, although statements of objectives (SOOs) and performance work statements (PWSs) have become increasingly popular due to their emphasis on performance-based concepts such as desired service outcomes and performance standards. SOWs are typically used when the task is well-known and can be described in specific terms. They may be preferred when the government does not desire innovative approaches or considers any deviation in contractor processes a risk. SOOs establish high-level outcomes and objectives for performance and PWSs emphasize outcomes, desired results, and objectives at a more detailed and measurable level, whereas SOWs provide explicit statements of work direction for the contractor or offeror to follow.

SOWs are typically replete with "contractor shall" statements of mandatory compliance (for example, "This task shall be performed in accordance with Agency xyz Directive, dated mm/dd/yyyy"). In practice, SOWs can also be found to contain references to desired performance outcomes, performance standards, and metrics, thus blurring their distinction between SOOs and PWSs. Aside from good practice, there is little government policy guidance that emphatically prescribes how and when to use SOWs versus SOOs or PWSs. Whereas the FAR defines PWS in Part 2 Definitions, and references SOOs and PWSs in Part 37.6 Performance Based Acquisition, SOWs are not addressed.

SOWs are usually contained in the government's solicitation (RFP or RFQ) and carried forward, as may be negotiated with the offeror, into the final contract. In federal solicitations and contracts, SOWs are inserted into Section C "Descriptions/Specifications" of the Uniform Contract Format, but may also be inserted as an attachment in Section J. In task orders, the SOW may simply be included among the terms and conditions of the order itself. The SOW is often supplemented by technical reference documents and attachments. In developing the SOW, it is important to ensure that the statement of work is comprehensive and sufficiently detailed, but that the statements do not duplicate terms and conditions or other provisions elsewhere in the solicitation or contract.

Guidance in MIL-STD-881 and MIL-HDBK-245 says that a work breakdown structure should be used in developing the SOW. This may use the WBS as an outline, where each WBS element (in the same name and numbering) are the sub-parts of the SOW section 3, making the development easier and to improve later billing and tracking. The WBS which focuses on intelligently dividing a hierarchy of the work elements and defining them may then have the SOW in matching sections focus on describing what will be done with that portion or how that portion will be done.

The statement of work should be directly linked to deliverables shown in the CDRL form. This is done by having each CDRL entry include reference to the SOW paragraph(s) that produces or uses the item, and the SOW text should be clear where it is discussing a deliverable by using the title or parenthesizing the item number (for example, "[A-001]").

== See also ==
- Contract data requirements list (CDRL)
- Master service agreement
