= Contract data requirements list =

U.S. military procurement specification

In United States military contracts, the contract data requirements list (CDRL, pronounced SEE-drill) is a list of authorized data requirements for a specific procurement that forms a part of the contract.

== Overview ==
The CDRL identifies what data products are to be formally delivered to the government by a contractor, as well as when and possibly how (e.g. format and quantity) they are to be delivered. The list typically is Section C of the Uniform Contract Format and consists of a series of individual data items, each of which is recorded on a Data Item form (DD Form 1423) containing the tailored data requirements and delivery information. The CDRL is the standard format for identifying potential data requirements in a solicitation, and deliverable data requirements in a contract. The purpose of the CDRL is to provide a standardized method of clearly and unambiguously delineating the government's minimum essential data needs. The CDRL groups all of the data requirements in a single place rather than having them scattered throughout the solicitation or contract.

Each CDRL data item should be linked directly to statement of work (SOW) tasks and managed by the program office data manager. Data requirements can also be identified in the contract via special contract clauses (e.g., DFARS), which define special data provisions such as rights in data, warranty, etc. SOW guidance of MIL-HDBK-245D describes the desired relationship: "Work requirements should be specified in the SOW, and all data requirements for delivery, format, and content should be in the contract data requirements list in conjunction with the appropriate Data Item Description (DID) respectively, with none of the requirements restated in other parts of the contract."

Subpart 215.470 of the Defense Federal Acquisition Regulation Supplement (DFARS) document requires the use of the CDRL in solicitations when the contract will require delivery of data. Guidance on how to fill in and handle DD Form 1423-1 is provided in publication 5010.12-M. Other US government agencies may include CDRLs in contracts, but these will not use the military's DD Form 1423.

Most data items are developed and delivered in compliance with pre-defined data item descriptions (DID). These pre-defined data items may be tailored by deleting any part of a DID that is not applicable to the specific acquisition. The CDRL form provides a block for simple citation of which DID it is, as well as where it is mentioned in the SOW and what part(s) of the overall work breakdown structure it is involved with. The remarks block may explain how the DID will be applied, but can not alter or add to the DID. (Language altering the data item description would obviously make it no longer a standard DID available by simple citation, pre-approved, and readily handled by existing Department of Defense processes.) Contracts issued by governments (including their militaries) outside the US also use CDRLs as part of their statements of Work. These CDRLs do not use the US military's DD Form 1423, but may utilize some of the same elements to define their need for documentation.

== See also ==
- Data Item Descriptions (DID)
- Government procurement in the United States
- MIL-STD-498 Software Development standard example of DID usage
- Statement Of Work (SOW)
