= Deliverable =

Good or service produced as the result of a project

A deliverable is a tangible or intangible good or service produced as a result of a project that is intended to be delivered to a customer (either internal or external). A deliverable could be a report, a document, a software product, a server upgrade or any other building block of an overall project. A deliverable may be composed of multiple smaller deliverables. It may be either an outcome to be achieved (as in "The corporation says that becoming profitable this year is a deliverable") or an output to be provided (as in "The deliverable for the completed project consists of a special-purpose electronic device and its controlling software").

Some deliverables are dependent on other deliverables being completed first; this is common in projects with multiple successive milestones. In this way many time-savings are possible, shortening greatly the whole project final supply term. This designing activity can be represented in the drawings with a "cloud" around a not yet designed part which means: "this part (size, or other characteristics) will be studied later". The part settled can be "delivered" to the interested parties.

A deliverable differs from a project milestone in that a milestone is a measurement of progress toward an output, whereas the deliverable is the output delivered to a customer or sponsor. For a typical project, a milestone might be the completion of a product design, while the deliverable might be the technical diagram or detailed design report of the product.

In technical projects, deliverables can be further classified as hardware, software, or design documents. In contracted efforts, deliverable may refer to an item specifically required by contract documents, such as an item on a contract data requirements list or mentioned in the statement of work.
