= Ford Bronco =

American sport-utility vehicle

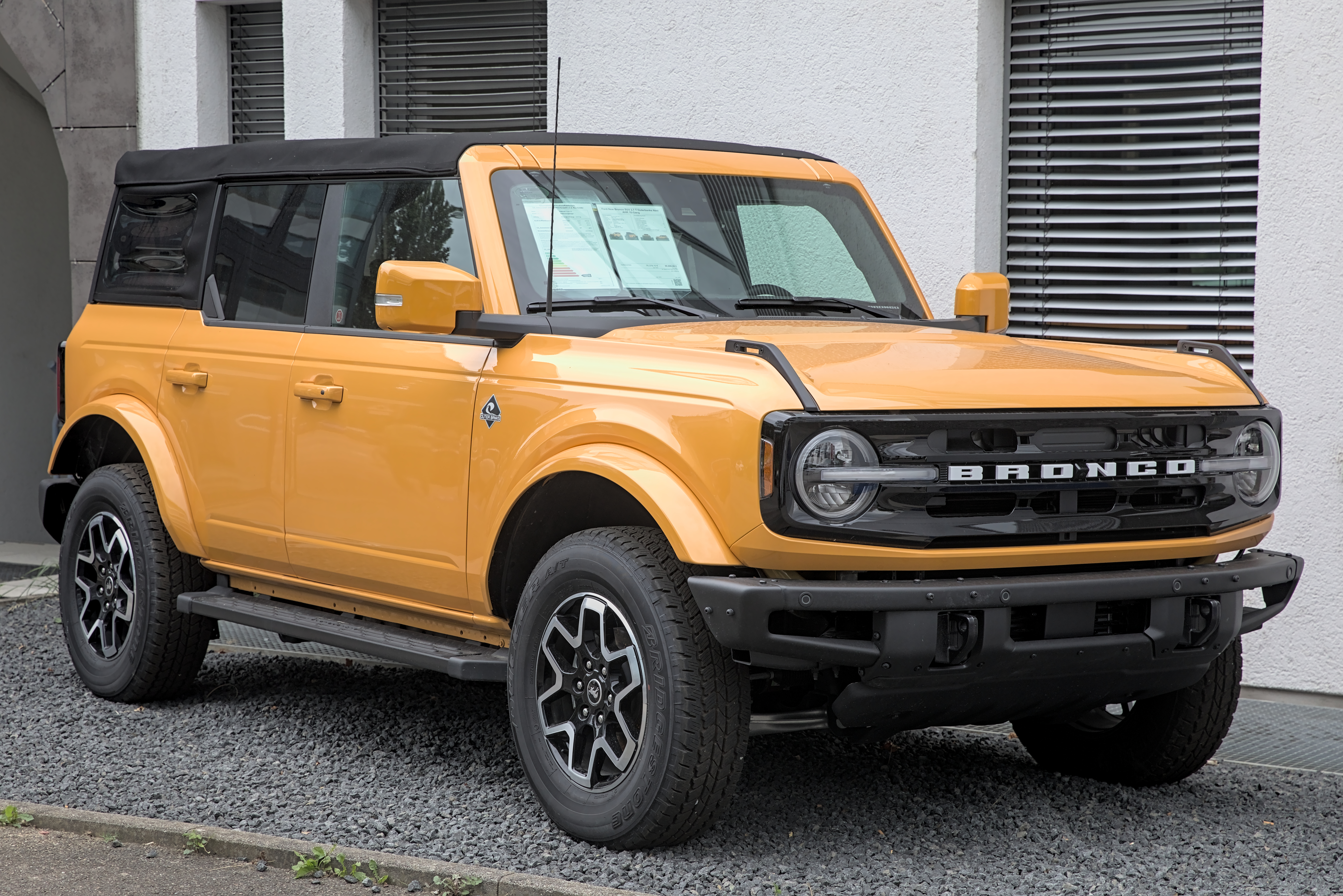
- 2021 Ford Bronco Outer Banks (4-door)

Overview
- Manufacturer: Ford Motor Company
- Production: 1965–1996; 2021–present
- Model years: 1966–1996; 2021–present

Body and chassis
- Class: Compact SUV (1965–1977, 2004 concept); Full-size SUV (1978–1996); Mid-size SUV (2021–present)
- Body style: 2-door SUV (1965–1996, 2004 concept, 2021–present); 4-door SUV (2021–present)
- Layout: Front-engine, four-wheel-drive
- Chassis: Body-on-frame

Chronology
- Successor: Ford Expedition (for full-size model)

The Ford Bronco is a model line of SUVs manufactured and marketed by Ford. The first SUV model developed by the company, five generations of the Bronco were sold from the 1966 to 1996 model years. A sixth generation of the model line was introduced for the 2021 model year. The nameplate has been used on other Ford SUVs, namely the 1984–1990 Bronco II compact SUV, the 2021 Bronco Sport compact crossover, and the China-only 2025 Bronco New Energy.

Originally developed as a compact off-road vehicle using its own chassis, the Bronco initially competed against the Jeep CJ-5 and International Scout. For 1978, Ford enlarged the Bronco, making it a short-wheelbase version of the F-Series pickup truck; the full-size Bronco now competed against the Chevrolet K5 Blazer and Dodge Ramcharger.

Following a decline in demand for large two-door SUVs, Ford discontinued the Bronco after the 1996 model year, replacing it with the four-door Ford Expedition; followed by the larger Ford Excursion. After a 25-year hiatus, the sixth-generation Bronco was reintroduced in 2021 as a mid-size two-door SUV. It is also offered as a full-size four-door SUV with a 16 in (41 cm) longer wheelbase. It competes directly with the Jeep Wrangler as both a two-door and a four-door (hardtop) convertible.

From 1965 to 1996, the Ford Bronco was manufactured by Ford at its Michigan Truck Plant in Wayne, Michigan, where it also manufactures the sixth-generation version.

== First generation (1966) ==
First generation
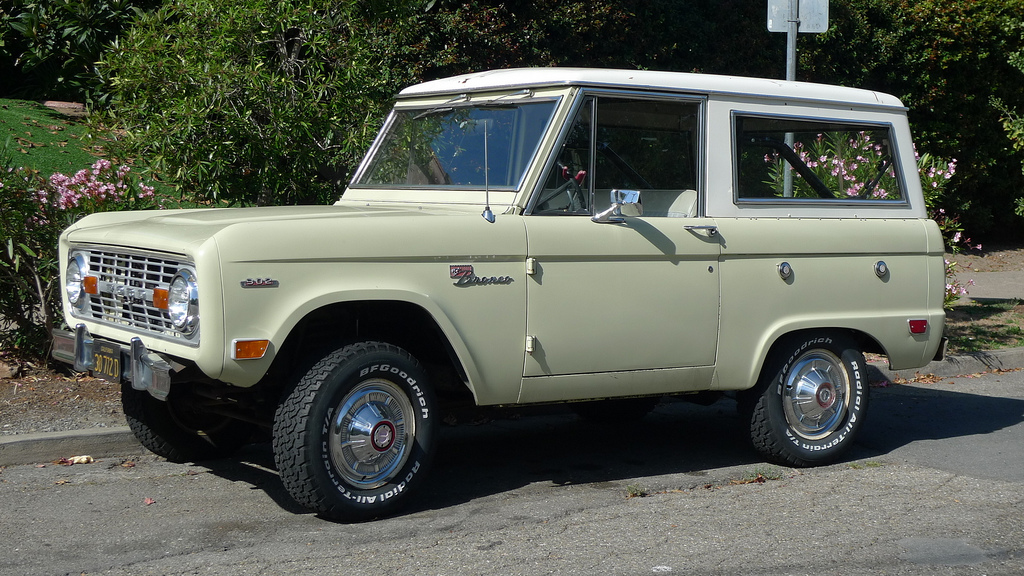
- Ford Bronco Wagon (First generation)

Overview
- Production: August 1965–1977
- Model years: 1966–1977
- Assembly: United States: Wayne, Michigan (Michigan Assembly Plant)
- Designer: Donald N. Frey (1964); Paul G. Axelrad, McKinley Thompson Jr. (1964)

Body and chassis
- Class: Compact SUV
- Body style: 3-door SUV; 2-door pickup; 0-door roadster
- Layout: F4 layout

Powertrain
- Engine: 170 cu in (2.8 L) Straight-6; 200 cu in (3.3 L) Straight-6; 289 cu in (4.7 L) small block V8; 302 cu in (4.9 L) small block V8
- Transmission: 3-speed manual; 3-speed automatic

Dimensions
- Wheelbase: 92 in (2,337 mm)
- Length: 151.5 in (3,848 mm)
- Width: 68.5 in (1,740 mm)
- Height: 71.6 in (1,819 mm)

The idea behind the Bronco began with Ford product manager Donald N. Frey in the early 1960s (who also conceived the Ford Mustang) and was engineered by Paul G. Axelrad, with Lee Iacocca approving the final model for production in February 1964, after the first clay models were built in mid-1963. Developed as an off-road vehicle (ORV), the Bronco was intended as a competitor for the Jeep CJ-5, International Scout and Toyota Land Cruiser. Today a compact SUV in terms of size, Ford marketing shows a very early example of promoting a civilian off-roader as a "Sports Utility" (the two-door pickup version).

Initially selling well, there was a decline in demand for the Bronco following the introduction of the Chevrolet Blazer, Jeep Cherokee, and International Scout II (from 1969 to 1974), as demand shifted towards SUVs with better on-road capability.

=== Chassis ===
The first-generation Bronco is built upon a chassis developed specifically for the model range, shared with no other Ford or Lincoln-Mercury vehicle. Built on a 92-inch wheelbase (sized between the CJ-5 and Scout; only an inch shorter than the later CJ-7), the Bronco used box-section body-on-frame construction.

To simplify production, all examples were sold with four-wheel drive; a shift-on the-fly Dana 20 transfer case and locking hubs were standard. The rear axle was a Ford 9-inch axle, with Hotchkiss drive and leaf springs; the front axle was a Dana 30, replaced by a Dana 44 in 1971. In contrast to the Twin I-Beams of larger Ford trucks, the Bronco used radius arms to locate the coil-sprung front axle, along with a lateral track bar, allowing for a 34-foot turning circle, long wheel travel, and antidive geometry (useful for snowplowing). A heavier-duty suspension system was an option, along with air front springs.

==== Powertrain ====
At its August 1965 launch, the Bronco was offered with a 170-cubic-inch inline six. Derived from the Ford Falcon, the 105-hp engine was modified with solid valve lifters, a 6-US-quart (6 L) oil pan, heavy-duty fuel pump, oil-bath air cleaner, and carburetor with a float bowl compensated against tilting. In March 1966, a 200-hp 289-cubic-inch V8 was introduced as an option. For the 1969 model year, the 289 V8 was enlarged to 302 cubic inches, remaining through the 1977 model year. For 1973, a 200 cubic-inch inline six became the standard engine, offered through 1977.

To lower production costs, at its launch, the Bronco was offered solely with a three-speed, column-shifted manual transmission and floor-mounted transfer case shifter (with a floor-mounted transmission shifter later becoming a popular modification). In 1973, in response to buyer demand, a three-speed automatic transmission was offered as an option.

=== Body design ===
In a central theme of the first-generation Bronco, styling was subordinated to simplicity and economy, so all glass was flat, bumpers were straight C-sections, and the left and right door skins were symmetrical (prior to the fitment of door-mounting hardware).

For 1966, three Bronco body configurations were offered, including a two-door wagon, a half-cab pickup, and an open-body roadster. With a base price of $2,194 (equivalent to $22,415 in 2025), the Bronco included few amenities as standard. However, a large number of options were offered through both Ford and its dealers, including front bucket seats, a rear bench seat, a tachometer, and a CB radio, as well as functional items such as a tow bar, an auxiliary gas tank, a power take-off, a snowplow, a winch, and a posthole digger. Aftermarket accessories included campers, overdrive units, and the usual array of wheels, tires, chassis, and engine parts for increased performance.

For 1967, Ford introduced the Sport option package for the Bronco wagon. Consisting primarily of chrome exterior trim and wheel covers, the Sport package was distinguished by red-painted "FORD" grille lettering. For 1970, the Bronco Sport became a freestanding model rather than an option package.

To comply with federal regulations, the Bronco was fitted with back-up lights and side marker lamps in 1967 and 1968, respectively. After struggling with sales, the open-body Bronco roadster was withdrawn after the 1968 model year.

After 1972, the Bronco half-cab was withdrawn; along with its lower sales compared to the wagon, Ford had introduced the larger Ford Courier compact pickup.

In a minor revision, for 1977, the exterior-mounted fuel tank caps were replaced behind hinged doors (as on all other Ford trucks).

1966–1977 Ford Bronco body styles

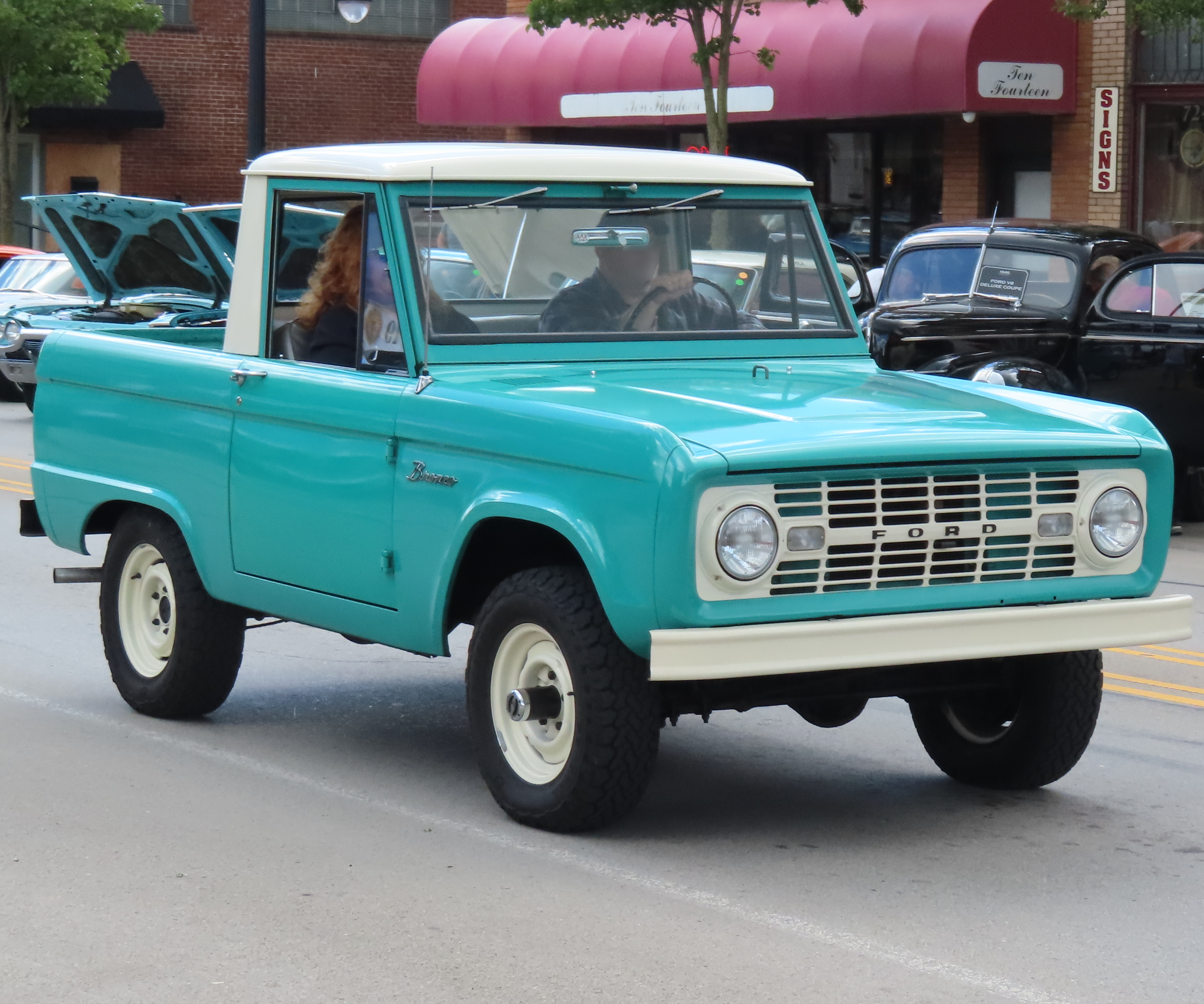
1966 Bronco pickup

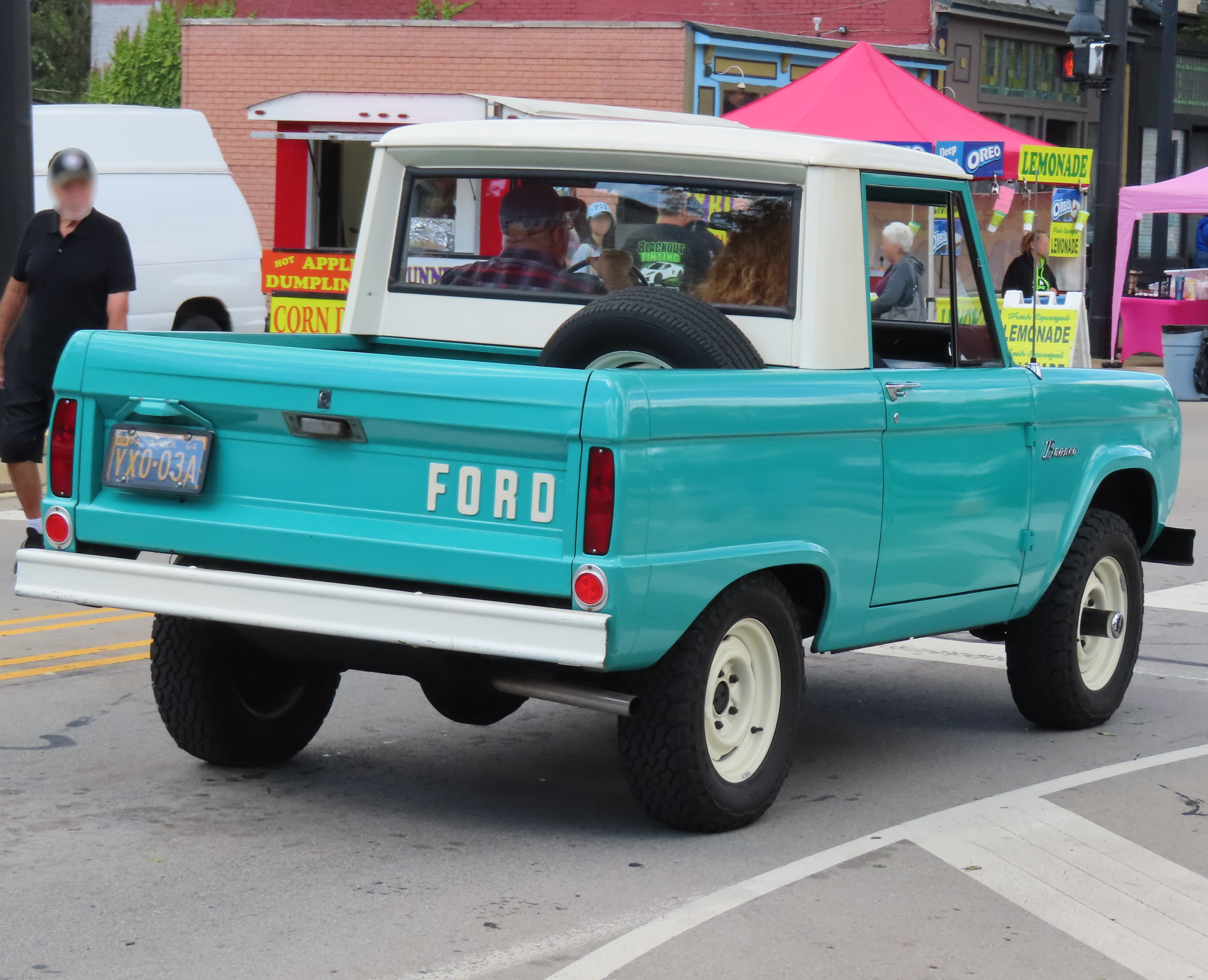
1966 Bronco pickup rear

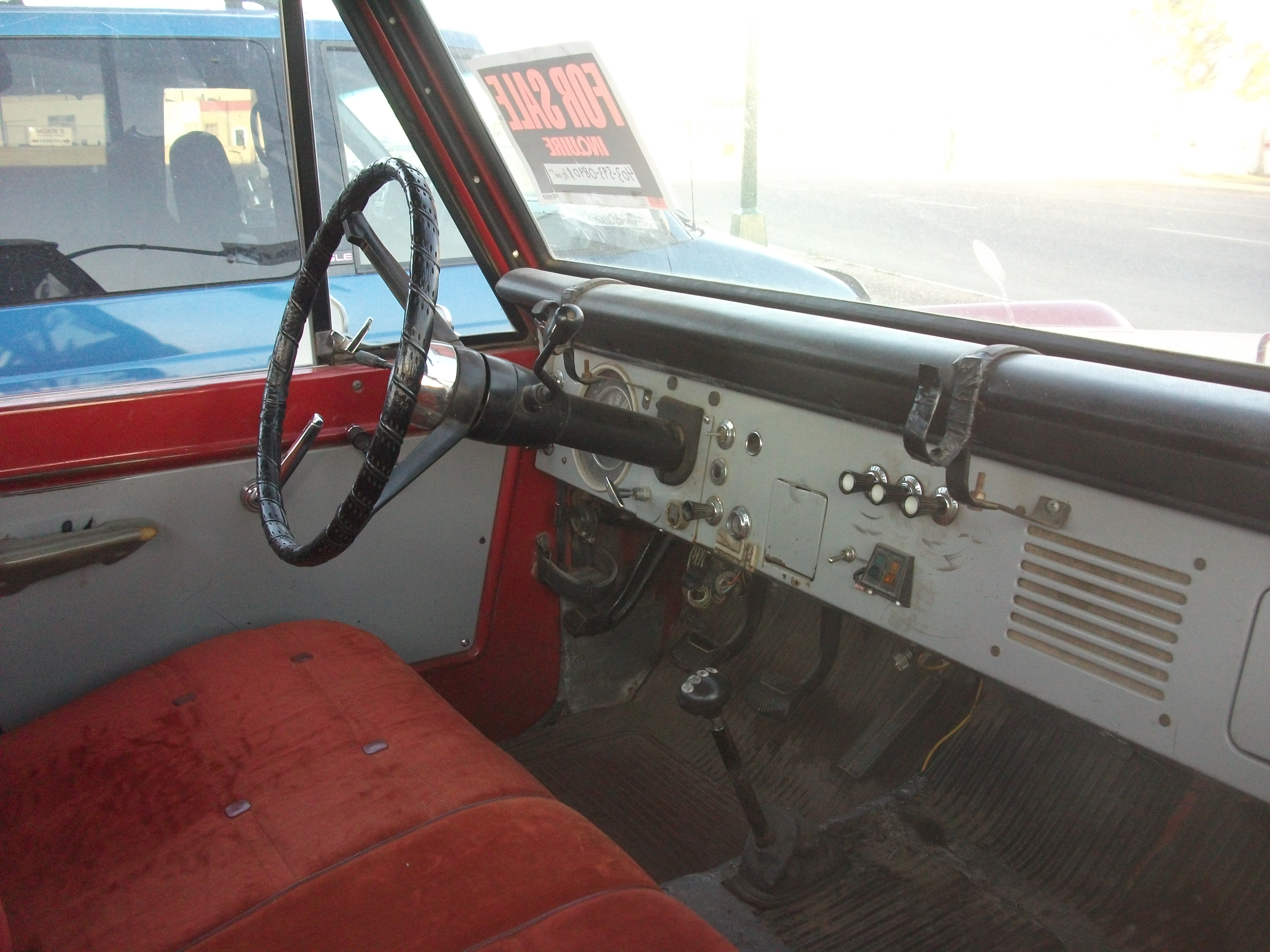
1966–1967 Bronco pickup interior

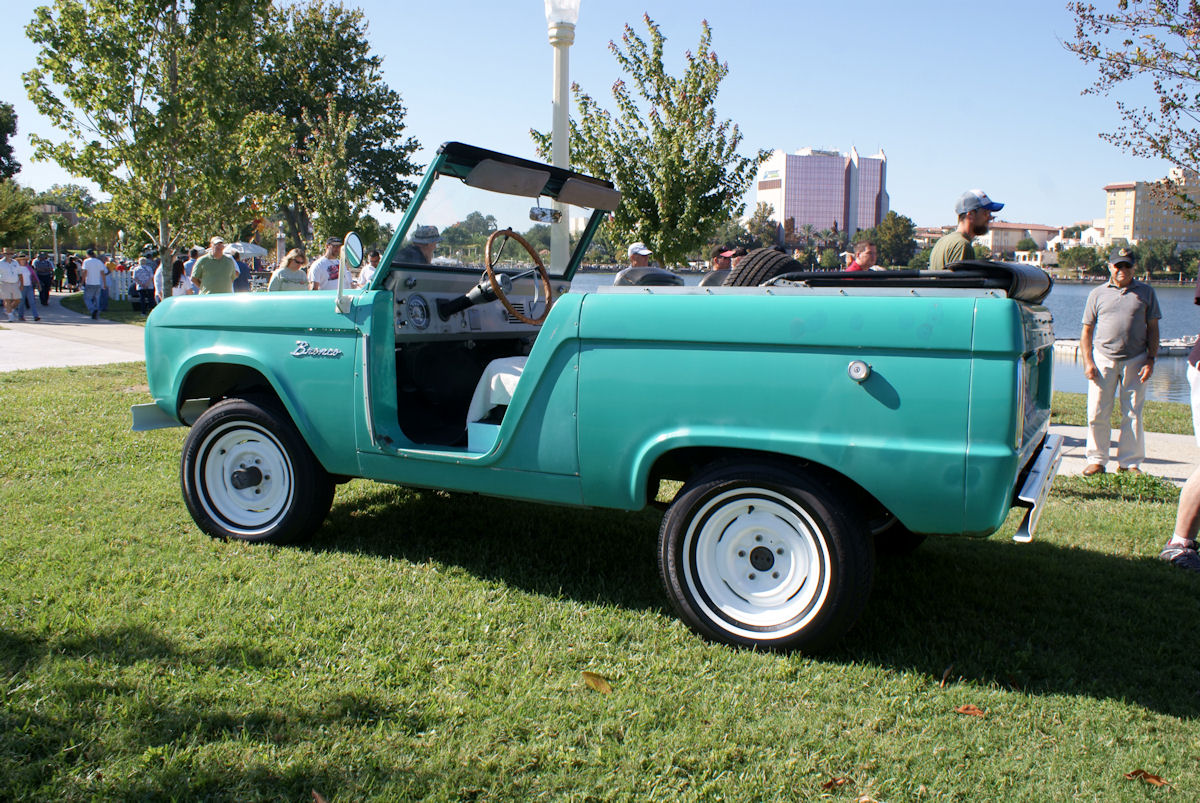
1966 Bronco roadster, left side

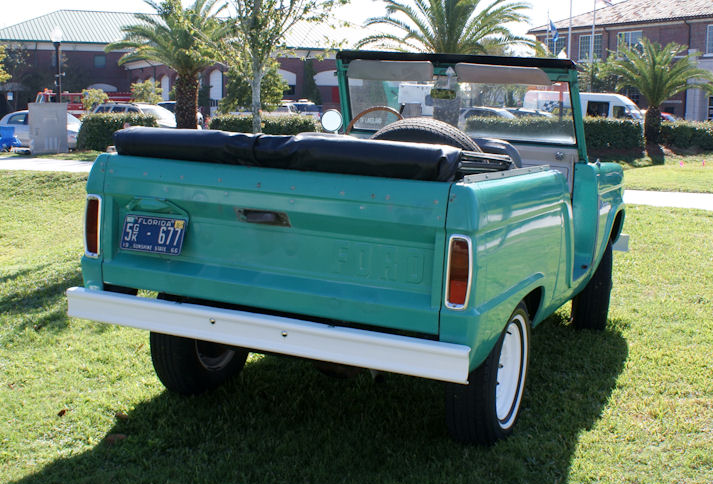
1966 Bronco roadster, rear

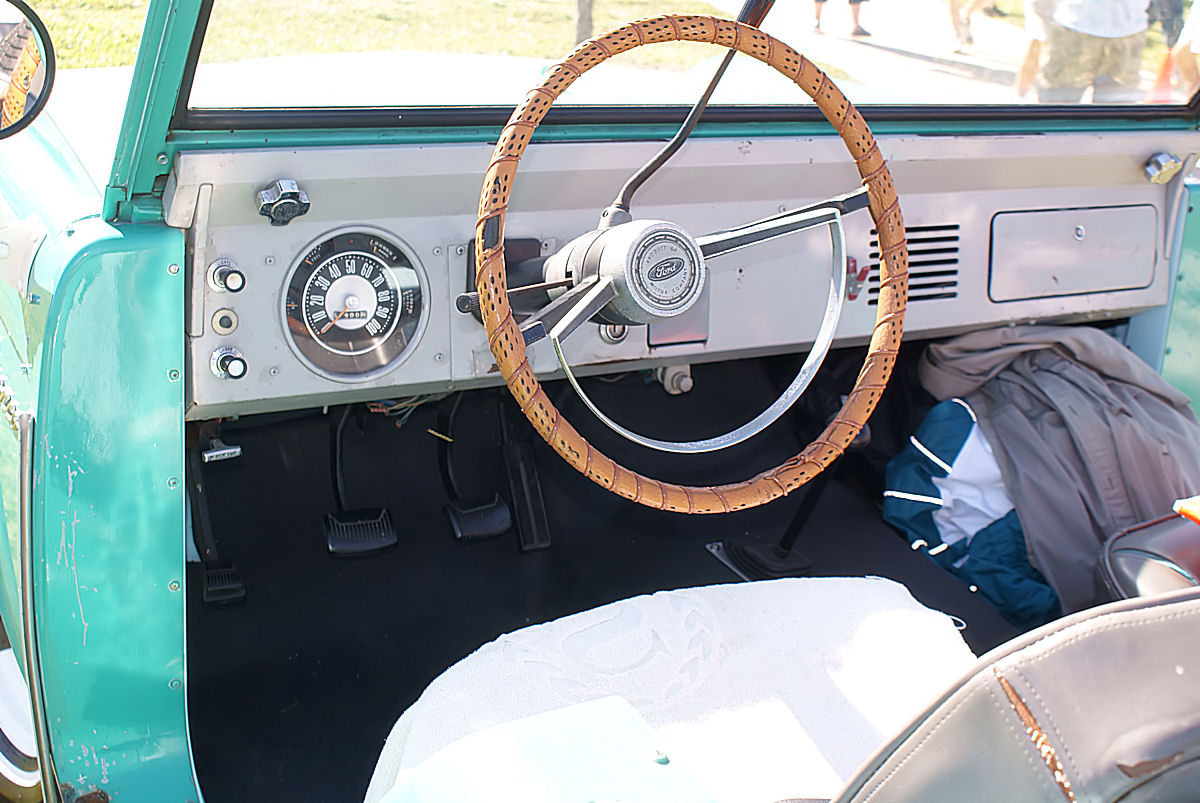
1966 Bronco roadster instrument panel

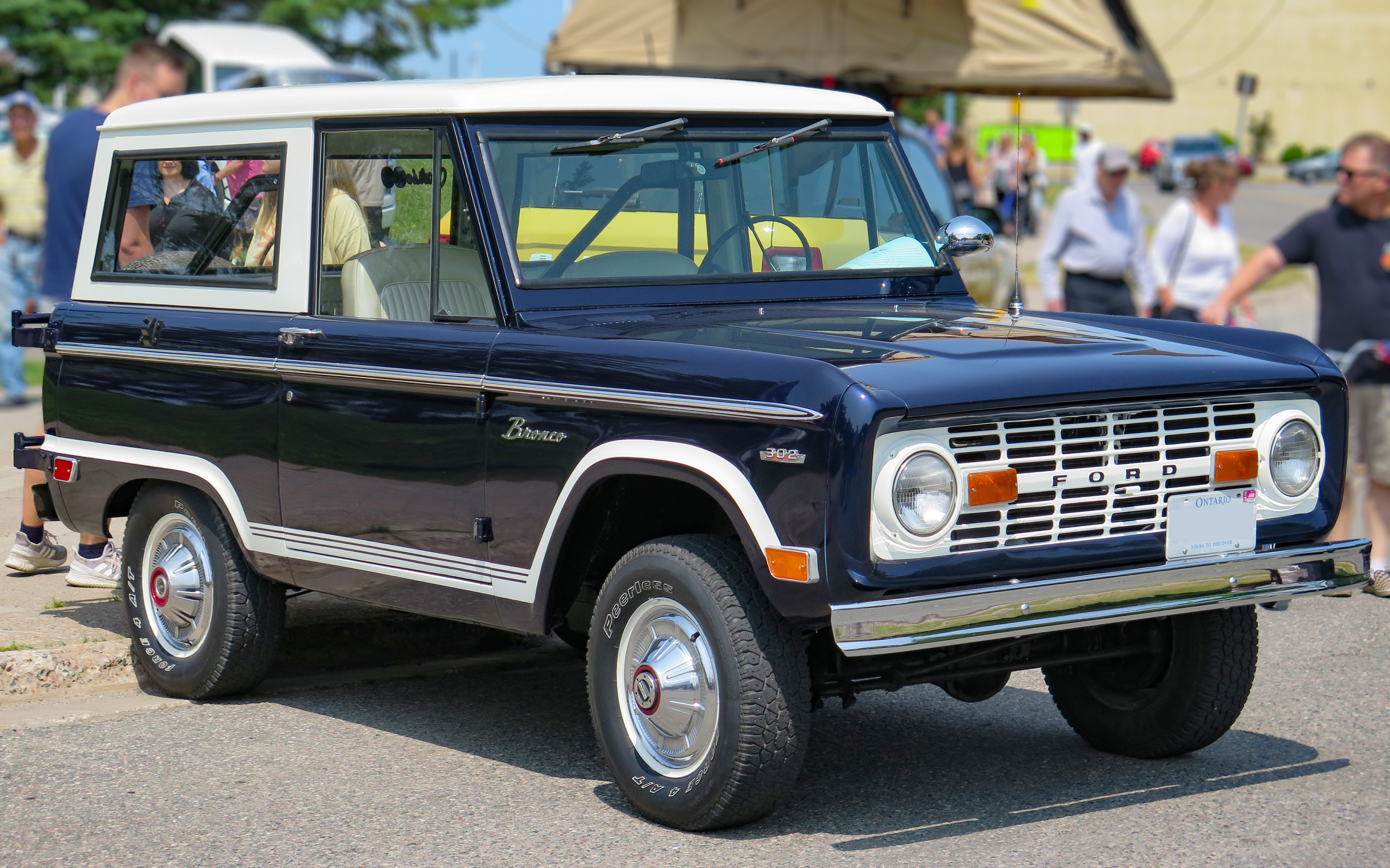
1969 Bronco wagon

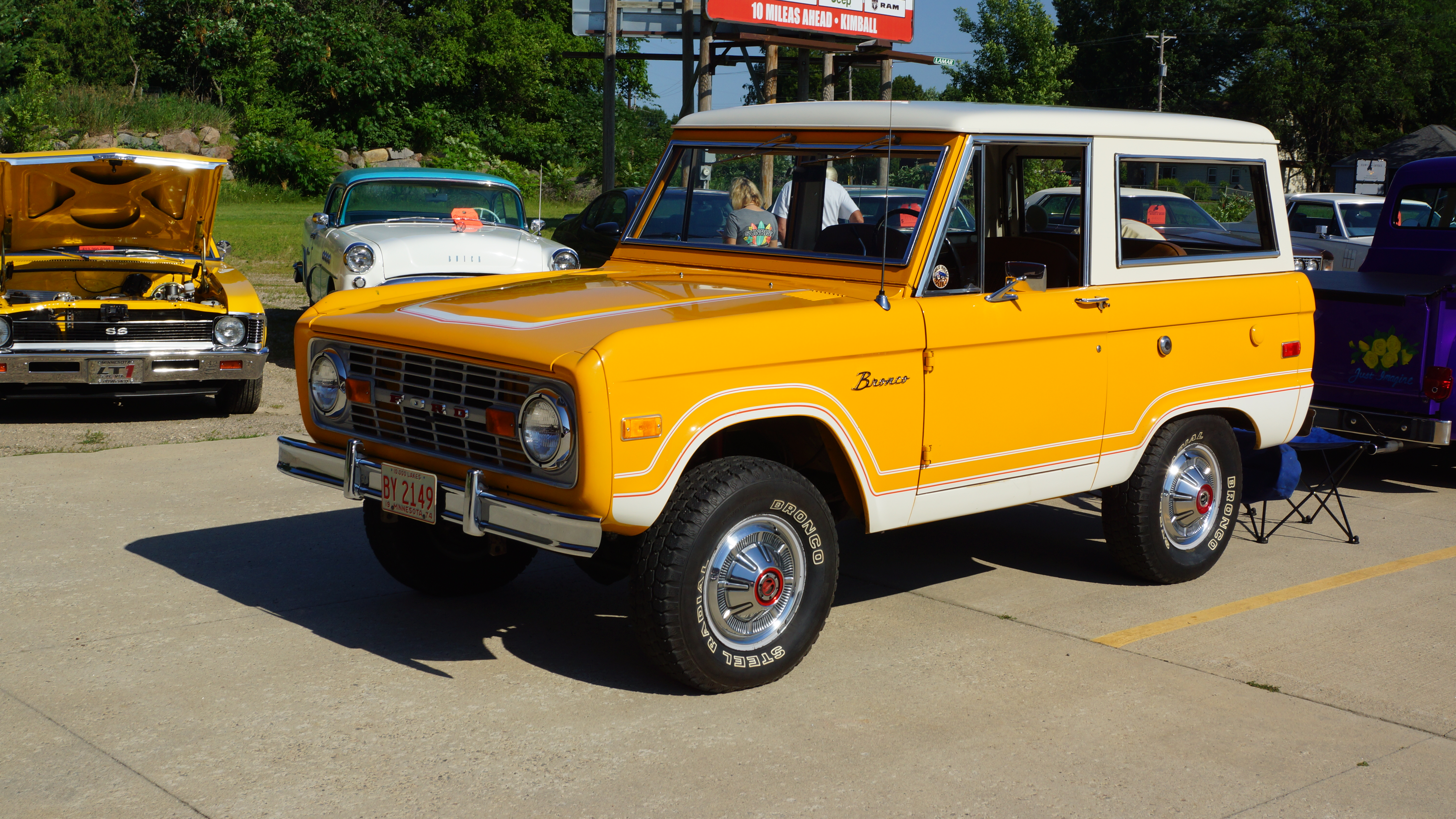
1972–1976 Bronco Ranger wagon

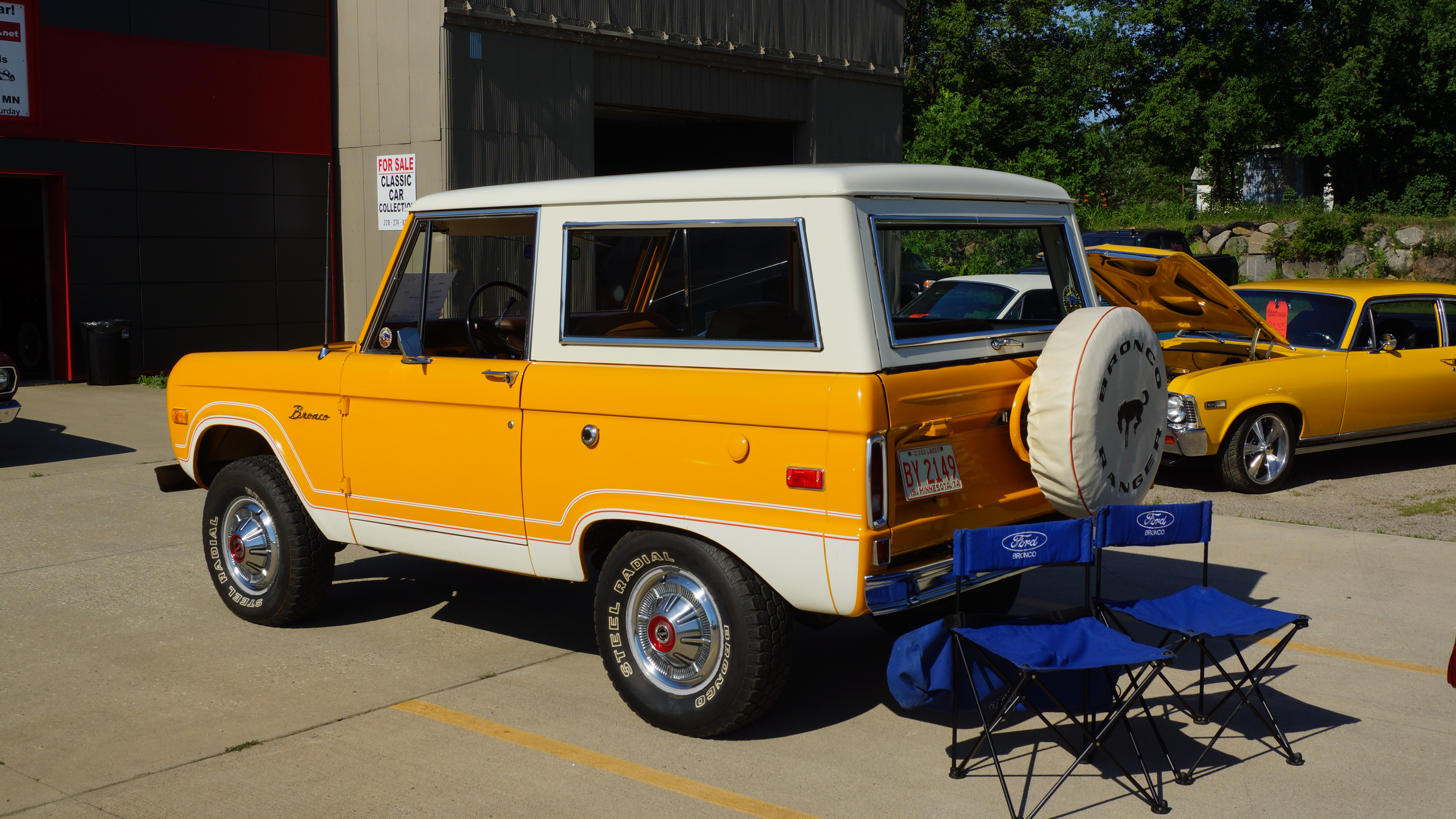
1972–1976 Bronco Ranger wagon, rear

=== Trim ===
Initially offered as a single trim level with a long option list, for 1967, Ford introduced the Sport option package for the Bronco wagon. Consisting primarily of chrome exterior trim and wheelcovers, the Sport package was distinguished by red-painted FORD grille lettering. For 1970, the Bronco Sport became a freestanding model rather than an option package.

For 1972, in line with the F-Series trucks, the Ranger trim became the top-of-the-line Bronco, offering body stripes, model-specific wheel covers, cloth seats, woodgrain door panels, and carpeted interior.

In a 1975 interior revision, the Bronco Sport and Bronco Ranger adapted the two-spoke steering wheel from the F-Series.

The optional full wheel covers on all first generation Broncos were the same ones used on the 1966 Galaxie.

=== Sales ===
1966–1977 Ford Bronco production
Year	Units
1966	23,776
1967	14,230
1968	16,629
1969	20,956
1970	18,450
1971	19,784
1972	21,115
1973	21,894
1974	25,824
1975	13,125
1976	15,256
1977	14,546

=== Racing ===
In 1965, race car builder Bill Stroppe assembled a team of Broncos for long-distance off-road competition. Partnering with Holman-Moody, the Stroppe/Holman/Moody (SHM) Broncos competed in the Mint 400, Baja 500, and Mexican 1000 (later named the Baja 1000). In 1969, SHM again entered a team of six Broncos in the Baja 1000. In 1971, a "Baja Bronco" package was marketed through Ford dealers, featuring quick-ratio power steering, automatic transmission, fender flares covering Gates Commando tires, a roll bar, reinforced bumpers, a padded steering wheel, and distinctive red, white, blue, and black paint. Priced at US$5,566, versus the standard V8 Bronco price of $3,665, only 650 were sold over the next four years.

In 1966, a Bronco "funny car" built by Doug Nash for the quarter-mile dragstrip finished with a few low 8-second times, but it was sidelined by sanctioning organizations when pickups and aluminum frames were outlawed.

== Second generation (1978) ==
Second generation
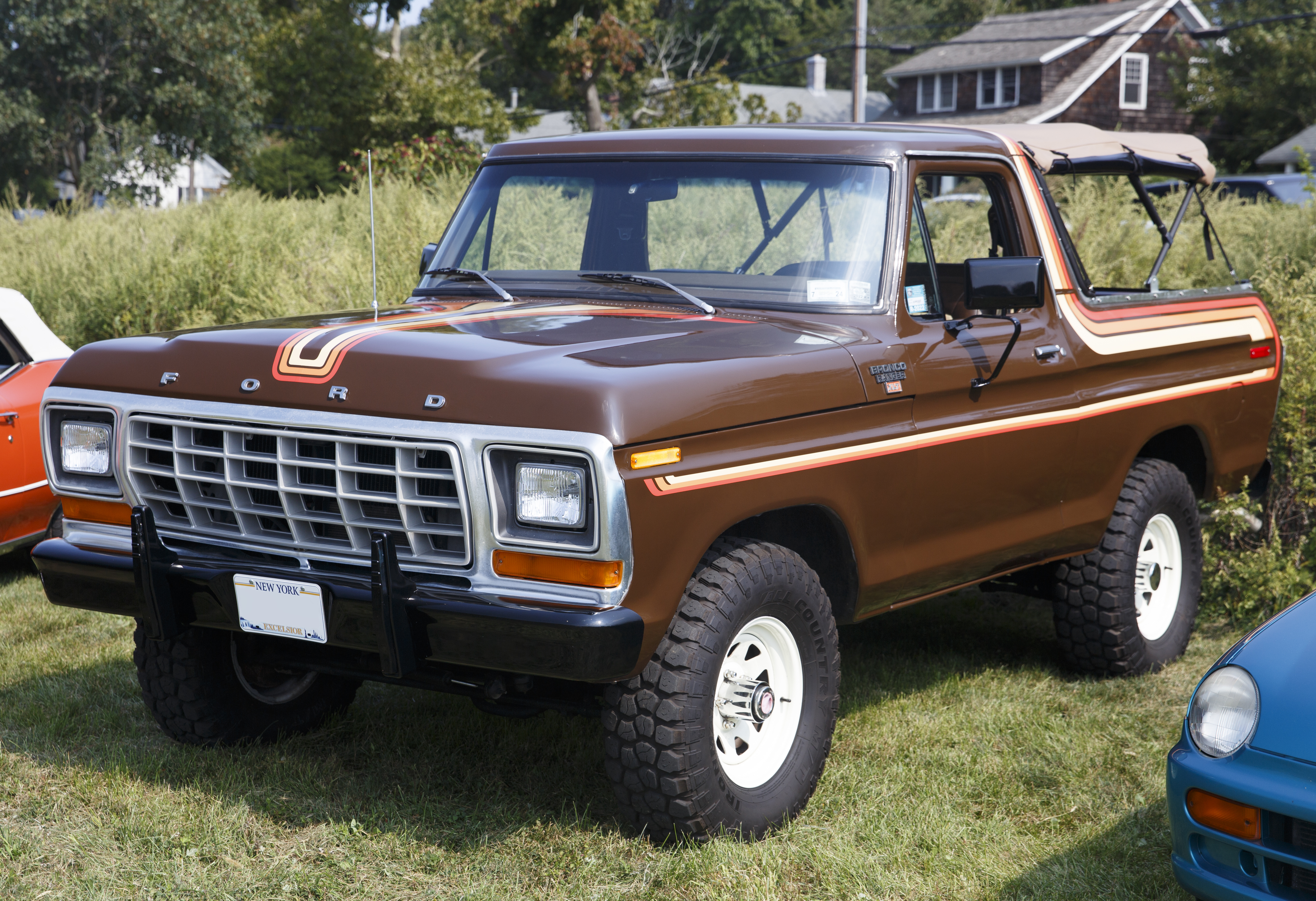
- 1978 Ford Bronco in Free-Wheelin' look (equipped with rare soft top option)

Overview
- Production: 1977–1979
- Model years: 1978–1979
- Assembly: United States: Wayne, Michigan (Michigan Assembly Plant)
- Designer: Dick Nesbitt (1972)

Body and chassis
- Class: Full-size SUV
- Body style: 3-door SUV
- Layout: F4 layout

Powertrain
- Engine: 351 cu in (5.8 L) 351M V8; 400 cu in (6.6 L) 400 V8
- Transmission: 4-speed Borg-Warner T-18 manual 4-speed New Process NP435 manual 3-speed C6 automatic

Dimensions
- Wheelbase: 104 in (2,642 mm)
- Length: 180.3 in (4,580 mm)
- Width: 79.3 in (2,014 mm)
- Height: 75.5 in (1,918 mm)
- Curb weight: 4,663–4,718 lb (2,115–2,140 kg)

For the 1978 model year, Ford released the second generation of the Bronco. To better compete with the Chevrolet K5 Blazer, Dodge Ramcharger, and Jeep Cherokee, the Bronco entered the full-size SUV segment. In place of a model-specific chassis, the Bronco was adapted directly from the Ford F-Series, becoming a shortened version of the F-100 4x4.

Originally intended for a 1974 launch, the second-generation Bronco (named "Project Shorthorn" during its development) was postponed to 1978 in response to fuel economy concerns related to the 1973 fuel crisis; the second-generation Bronco was released for sale after development was nearly finalized on its 1980 successor. In a notable break from a period of downsizing in the American automotive industry, the second-generation Bronco grew significantly in size (though the change was intentional). The adoption of the F-Series design added 12 inches of wheelbase, approximately 28 inches of length, 11 inches of width, and 4 inches of height; based on powertrain configuration, the 1978 Bronco gained 1,100 to 1,600 pounds of curb weight over its 1977 predecessor.

The first version of the Bronco derived from the F-Series, the 1978 Bronco retained the previous lift-off hardtop for the three-door wagon (replacing the full-length steel top with a fiberglass half-length hardtop). The configuration was continued through the 1996 retirement of the model line.

In spite of its short two-year production life, the design change for the Bronco proved successful in the marketplace, as the model line overtook both the Blazer and the Ramcharger in sales for the first time; initial demand was so strong that customers waited several months to receive vehicles from dealers.

=== Chassis ===
The second generation Bronco is based on the Ford F-100 pickup truck chassis (1973–1979 sixth generation). Approximately one foot shorter than the shortest F-100, the Bronco has a 104-inch wheelbase (12 inches longer than the previous Bronco). The second generation Bronco is still fitted exclusively with four-wheel drive; a part-time system was standard with a New Process 205 gear-driven transfer case with the option of permanent four-wheel drive and a New Process 203 chain-driven transfer case.

The second generation Bronco has a coil-sprung Dana 44 front axle and a leaf-sprung rear Ford 9-inch axle (similar to the later first generation Broncos). The first and second generation Broncos both have non-independent front suspension (solid front axle); this would be the last version to do so.

==== Powertrain details ====
In adopting the F-Series chassis, the second-generation Bronco underwent a complete revision of its powertrain offerings, offering two different V8 engines. The 5.8L 351M engine was standard, with the 6.6L 400 V8 optional. While the two engines offered virtually the same horsepower output, the 400 V8 produced a higher torque output over the 351M. At the time, the 460 large-block V8 was only offered on rear-wheel drive trucks, making it unavailable on the Bronco.

For 1979, Ford added emissions controls to its light-truck engines, with the Bronco receiving a catalytic converter (among other equipment) for both V8 engines.

1978–1979 Ford Bronco powertrain details
Engine	Production	Configuration	Carburetion	Output	
Engine	Production	Configuration	Carburetion	Horsepower	Torque
Ford 351M (335/Cleveland) V8	1978–1979	352 cu in (5.8 L) 16-valve V8	2-bbl	156 hp (1978) 158 hp (1979)	262 lb-ft
Ford 400 (335/Cleveland) V8	1978–1979	402 cu in (6.6 L) 16-valve V8	2-bbl	158 hp (1978) 156 hp (1979)	277 lb-ft

=== Body ===
Replacing the multiple body configurations of the first generation, the second-generation Bronco was offered solely as a 3-door wagon with a lift-off rear hardtop. During its development as Project Shorthorn, a central requirement by Ford was to adopt bodywork from the F-100 with minimal modification. In addition to its chassis (with a shortened wheelbase), the 1978 Bronco derives much of its body from the F-series truck line, sharing its doors, forward roofline and sheetmetal, and its interior (forward of the B-pillars) with the F-100.

Retaining the wagon body from its predecessor, Ford designers shifted from a full-length hardtop (as with the previous Bronco and on the Jeep CJ-7) to a lift-off hardtop from behind the B-pillars. Designed by Dick Nesbitt, the configuration achieved higher commonality with the F-100 (sharing the doors and overhead roof stamping); attention was focused on minimizing leaks around the top seals (a problem related to the design of the K5 Blazer hardtop of the time). In a configuration similar to the Ford LTD Country Squire, the glass of the rear window rolled down into the tailgate (via a dash-mounted switch or from using the key on the outside), allowing the tailgate to fold down.

Coinciding with its commonality with the F-100, the second-generation Bronco introduced features new to the model line for the first time, including air conditioning, radio, and tilt steering. While a two-seat interior remained standard, the 11-inch wider interior allowed for a three-passenger front bench seat; with a folding and removable rear seat, the Bronco became a six-passenger vehicle for the first time.

For 1979, the Bronco saw little change from 1978 models. Along with the F-Series, rectangular headlamps (introduced on the Ranger trim for 1978) became standard on all Broncos. In an interior revision, taller captain's chair front seats became an option.

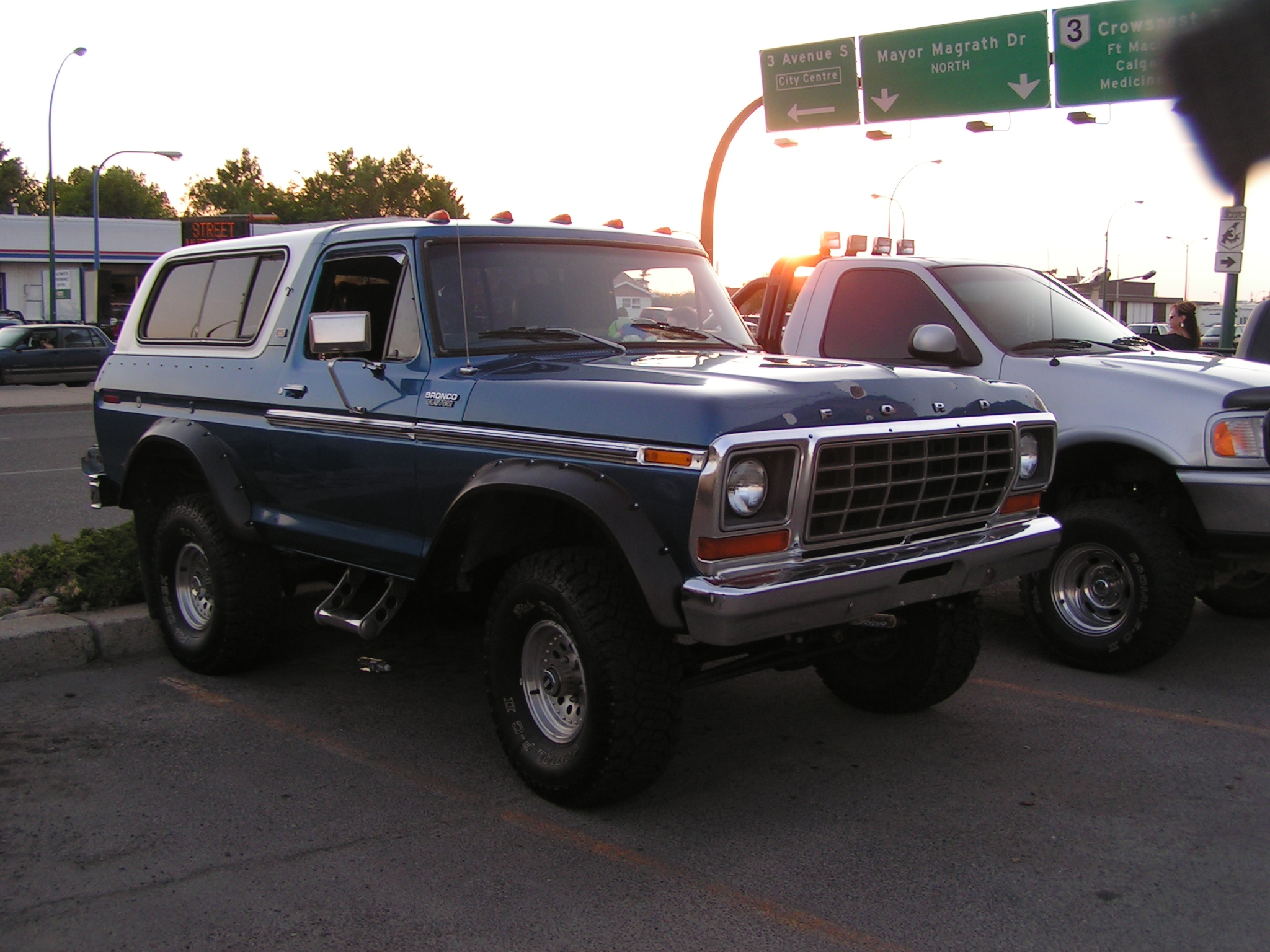
1978 Bronco Custom (aftermarket wheels/tires)

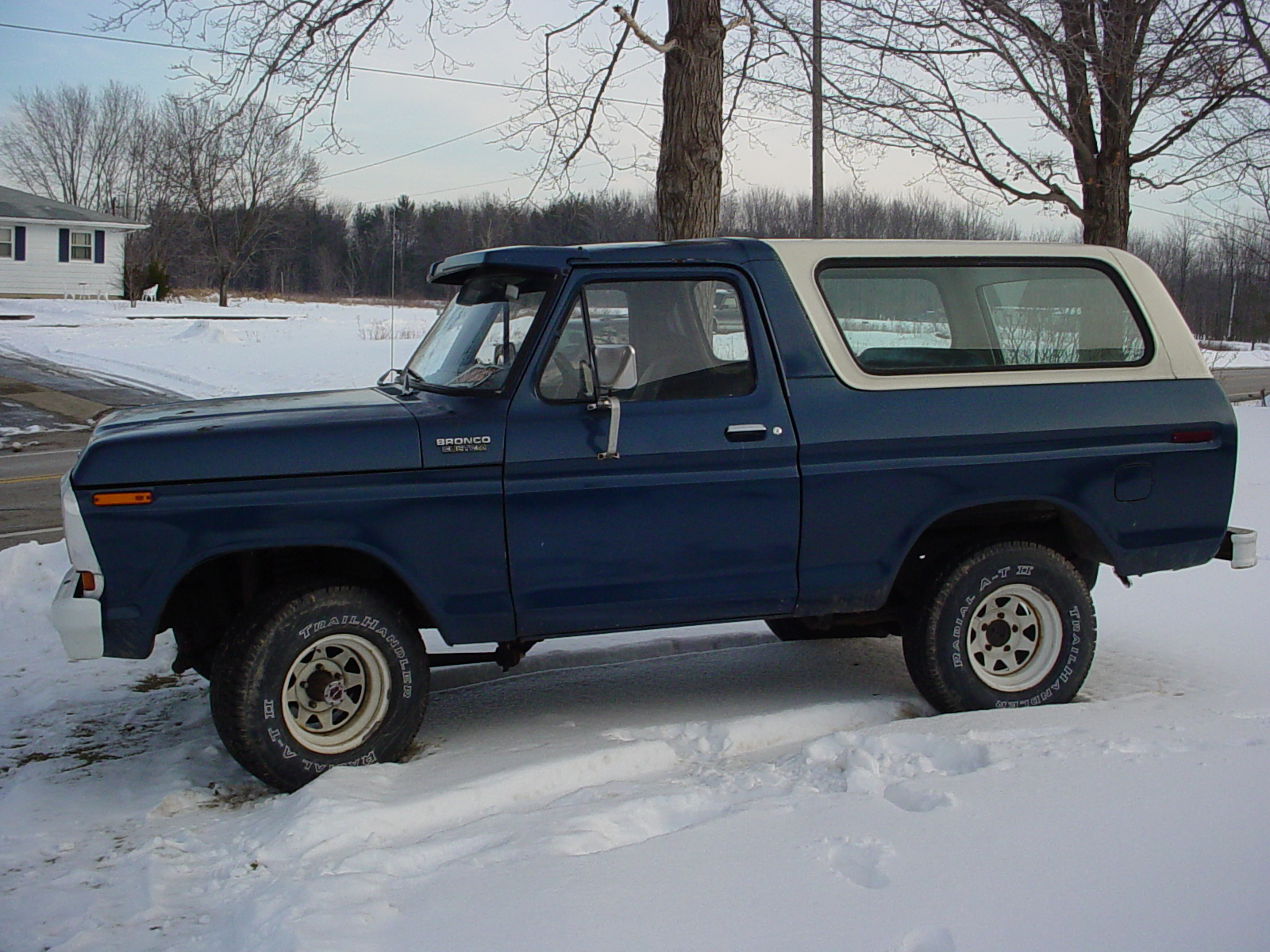
1978 Bronco Custom

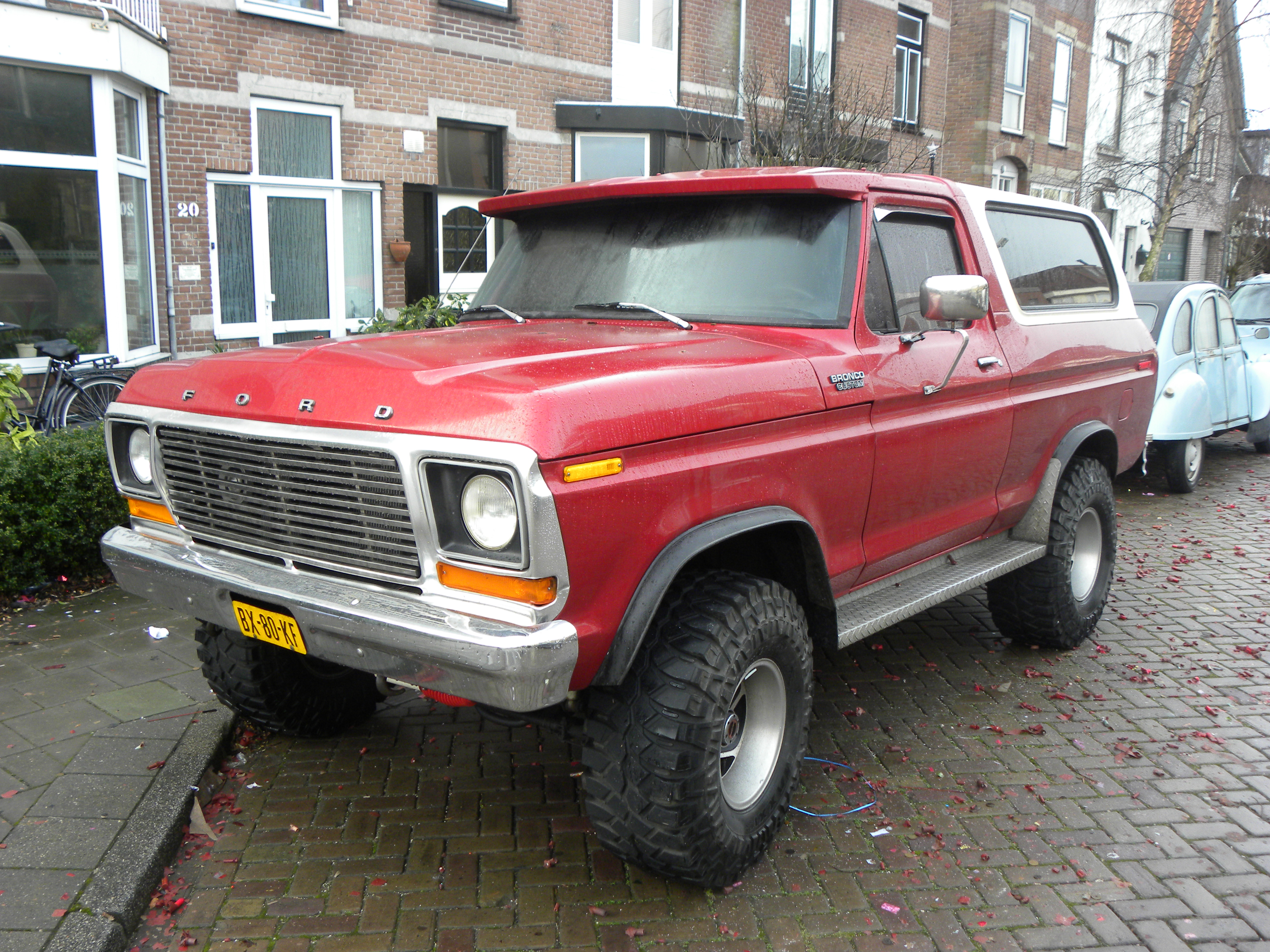
1978 Bronco (aftermarket tires)

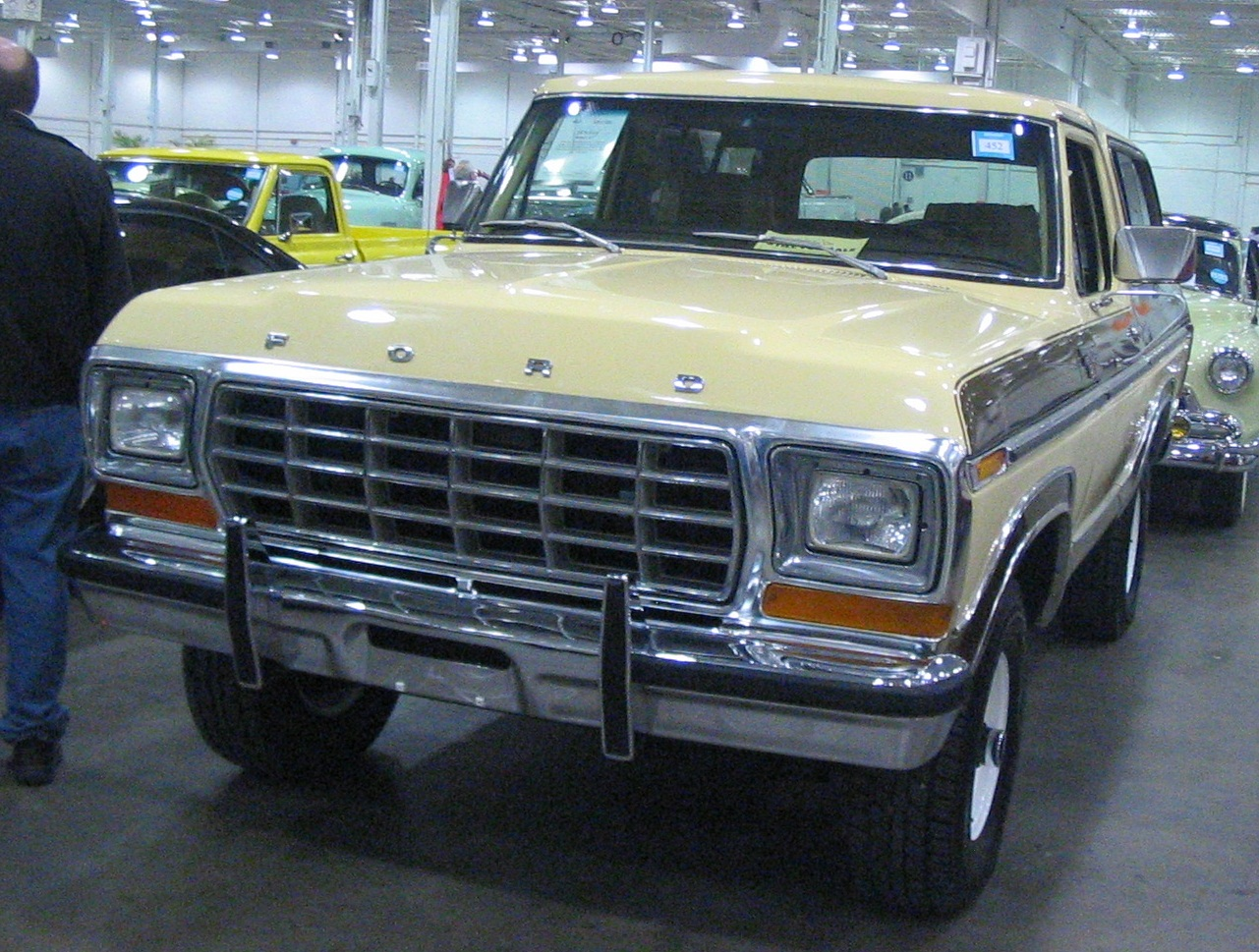
1979 Bronco Ranger XLT

=== Trim ===
For the second-generation Bronco, the model line adopted the same trim nomenclature as the F-Series. The Bronco Custom served as the standard-trim model with the Bronco Ranger XLT as the top-level trim. For 1978, as with the F-Series trucks, Customs were fitted with round headlamps while Ranger XLTs had rectangular units, which became standard for all Broncos for 1979.

Alongside the Econoline, F-Series, and Courier, the 1978-1979 Bronco was offered with a "Free-Wheelin'" package. Available with both Custom and Ranger XLT trims, the cosmetic option featured tricolor striping and blacked-out exterior trim; the striping design was revised for 1979.

=== Sales ===
1978–1979 Ford Bronco production
Year	Units
1978	77,917
1979	104,038

== Third generation (1980) ==
Third generation
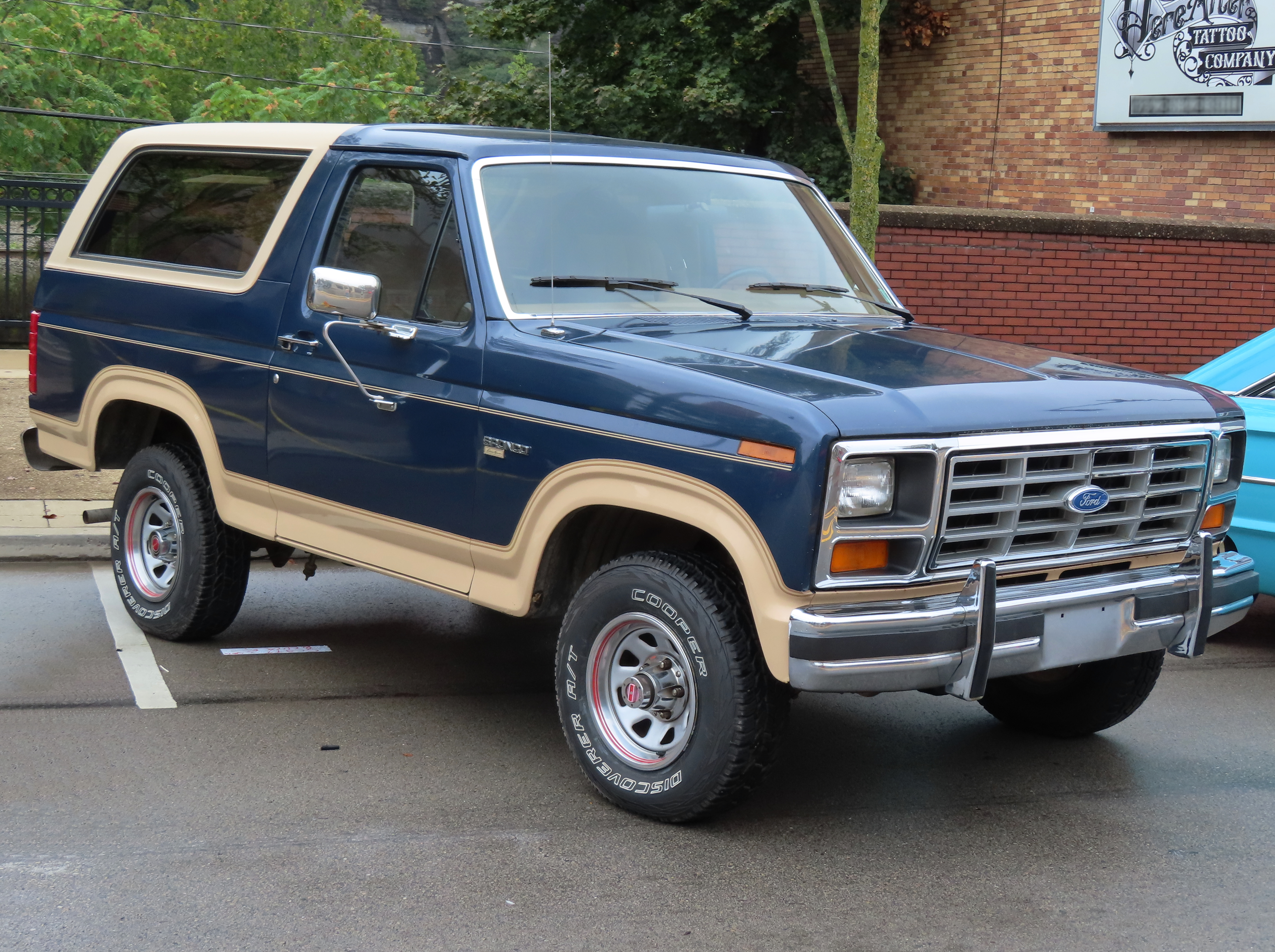

Overview
- Production: 1979–1986
- Model years: 1980–1986
- Assembly: United States: Wayne, Michigan (Michigan Assembly Plant); Australia: Broadmeadows
- Designer: Don Kopka (design director); John Najjar (1977)

Body and chassis
- Class: Full-size SUV
- Body style: 3-door SUV

Powertrain
- Engine: 300 cu in (4.9 L) Straight-6; 302 cu in (4.9 L) 302 V8; 351 cu in (5.8 L) 351M V8; 351 cu in (5.8 L) Windsor V8
- Transmission: 4-speed Borg-Warner T-18 manual 4-speed New Process NP435 manual 4-speed Tremec RTS OverDrive; 3-speed C6 automatic 4-speed AOD

Dimensions
- Wheelbase: 104 in (2,642 mm)
- Length: 180.4 in (4,582 mm)
- Width: 79.3 in (2,014 mm)
- Height: 75.5 in (1,918 mm)
- Curb weight: 4,343–4,374 lb (1,970–1,984 kg)

Beginning production development in 1977 (before its predecessor was released for sale) the third generation Bronco was designed to address many concerns that held the 1978–1979 Bronco out of production. Nominally shorter and lighter, the 1980 Bronco was designed to adopt a more efficient powertrain while retaining its full-size dimensions.

In 1982, the Ford Bronco II made its debut; unrelated to the full-size Bronco, the Bronco II was a compact SUV based on a shortened Ranger pickup truck and sized similarly to the 1966–1977 Bronco.

=== Chassis ===
Again based on the Ford F-Series, the 1980–1986 Bronco is based upon the Ford F-150 (1980–1986 seventh generation). Although based on an all-new chassis, the Bronco retained its 104 in (2,642 mm) wheelbase. In attempting to maximize fuel economy gains over the previous year, Ford engineers gave the 1980-81 models a much weaker frame with holes stamped out at the factory, providing a curb weight reduction of 375 lb (170 kg). The lightened frame was dropped in 1982 for more strength and rigidity, adding 31 lb (14 kg) to the curb weight. Both transfer cases were replaced with New Process 208 or Borg Warner 1345 versions at the same time.

In front, the 1980–1986 Bronco is fitted with a Dana 44 front axle with Ford TTB (Twin Traction Beam) independent front suspension. As with the 1978–1979 Bronco, the rear axle was first a leaf-sprung Ford 9-inch axle in early models, however Ford transitioned all half ton trucks to their 8.8 rear axle by the end of 1986.

For the first time since 1977, the Bronco came with an inline-six engine as standard; the 4.9-liter 300 I6 was available solely with a manual transmission. The 400 V8 was discontinued, with the 351M taking its place and the 302 V8 making its return as the base-equipment V8. The 351 Windsor made its debut in the Bronco as it replaced the 351M in 1982; gaining a 210 hp (157 kW) "high-output" version in 1984. In 1985, the 4.9-liter V8 (302) saw its carburetor replaced by a multiport electronic fuel-injection system, with output rising to 190 hp (142 kW). The standard, 156 hp (116 kW) 5.8L V8 was discontinued for 1986.

=== Body ===
As with its predecessor, the 1980–1986 Bronco shares much of its external sheetmetal with the F-Series pickup line, with the same parts from the doors forward. Based on a design proposal originally used in the development of the previous-generation Bronco, the B-pillar of the roofline was modified slightly to produce an improved seal for the hardtop. Prior to 1984, the hardtop included sliding window glass as an option.

For 1982, the Bronco saw a slight facelift as it adopted Ford's blue oval emblem, taking the place of "F-O-R-D" lettering on the hood, and the bronco horse was removed from the fender emblems.

=== Trim ===
The 1980–1986 Bronco adopted the same trim levels as the Ford F-Series pickups. Following the introduction of the Ford Ranger compact pickup, the Bronco adopted Bronco (base, replacing Custom), Bronco XL, and Bronco XLT.

In 1985, Ford added an Eddie Bauer trim package for the Bronco. Featuring a color-keyed two-tone exterior, the trim package featured an outdoors-themed interior.

=== Sales ===
1980–1986 Ford Bronco production
Year	Units
1980	44,353
1981	39,853
1982	40,782
1983	40,376
1984	40,376
1985	54,562
1986	62,127

=== Australian assembly ===
Outside of the US, the third generation Bronco was also assembled in Australia by Ford Australia, utilizing locally produced 4.1-litre six-cylinder and 5.8-litre V8 engines. It was marketed in Australia from March 1981 through to 1987.

== Fourth generation (1987) ==
Fourth generation
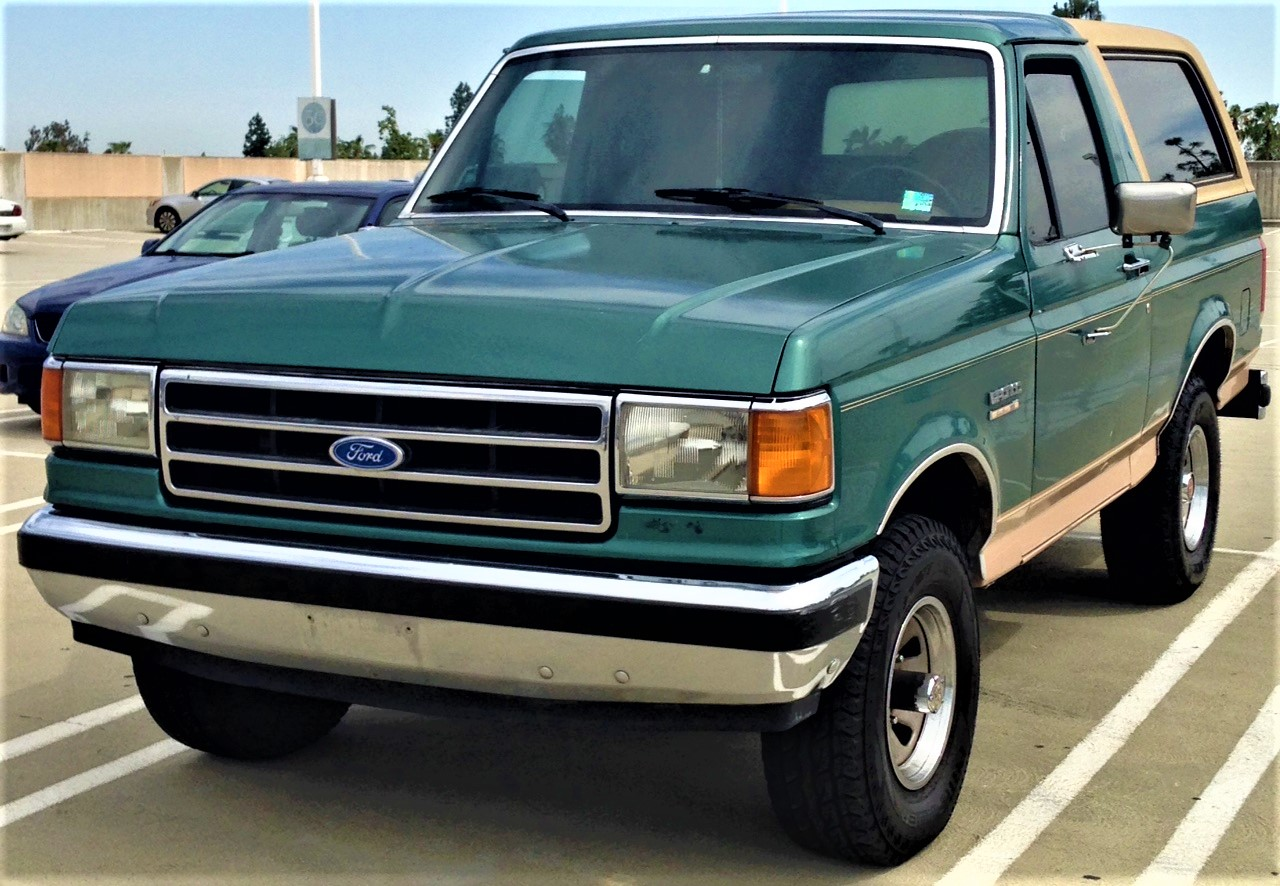

Overview
- Production: 1986–1991
- Model years: 1987–1991
- Assembly: United States: Wayne, Michigan (Michigan Assembly Plant); Venezuela: Valencia, Carabobo (Valencia Assembly)

Body and chassis
- Class: Full-size SUV
- Body style: 3-door SUV

Powertrain
- Engine: 300 cu in (4.9 L) Straight-6; 302 cu in (4.9 L) 302 V8; 351 cu in (5.8 L) Windsor V8
- Transmission: 4-speed Borg-Warner T-18 manual 5-speed M5OD-R2 manual 3-speed C6 automatic 4-speed AOD automatic 4-speed E4OD automatic

Dimensions
- Wheelbase: 104.7 in (2,660 mm)
- Length: 180.5 in (4,580 mm)
- Width: 79.1 in (2,010 mm)
- Height: 1987–1989: 74.0 in (1,880 mm). 1990–1991: 74.5 in (1,890 mm)

For the 1987 model year, the fourth-generation Bronco was designed as a short-wheelbase version of the eighth-generation Ford F-150. Sharing its chassis with the previous generation, the 1987 Bronco was given a number of updates to both the exterior and interior. Sharing a common front fascia with the F-Series, the Bronco received a reshaped front bumper, flatter front grille, and reshaped hood; composite headlamps replaced the previous sealed-beam units. In another body revision, the wheel openings were reshaped. The interior was given redesigned front seats, door panels, dashboard and controls (including a new steering wheel), and instrument panels.

The Bronco returned its 4.9L inline-6, 5.0L V8, and the 5.8L H.O. V8 engines from the previous generations; first introduced on the 5.0L V8 in 1985, fuel injection was added to the inline-6 for 1987 and to the 5.8L V8 for 1988. For the 1988 model year, a Mazda-sourced 5-speed manual was introduced. The 3-speed C6 automatic was offered from 1987 to 1990, phased out in favor of the overdrive-equipped 4-speed AOD (1990 only) and heavier-duty E4OD (1990-1991).

In the interest of safety, rear-wheel anti-lock brakes (ABS) became standard for the 1987 model. As an option, push-button control was introduced for the four-wheel drive system for 1987. For 1988, skid plates for the transfer case became standard equipment.

=== Special editions ===
Silver Anniversary-specific treatments for rear bumper and spare tire cover

To commemorate 25 years of production, Ford offered a Silver Anniversary Edition Bronco for the 1991 model year. A cosmetic option package, the Silver Anniversary Edition featured Currant Red exterior paint (package exclusive) and a gray leather interior (the first time leather seating was available for a Bronco).

For 1991 through 1992, the Nite option package featured a completely blacked-out exterior with contrasting graphics. Alongside the top-line Eddie Bauer trim, both special editions were available only with a V8 engine and automatic transmission.

=== Sales ===
1987–1991 Ford Bronco production
Year	Units
1987	43,074
1988	43,074
1989	69,470
1990	54,832
1991	25,001

== Fifth generation (1992) ==
Fifth generation
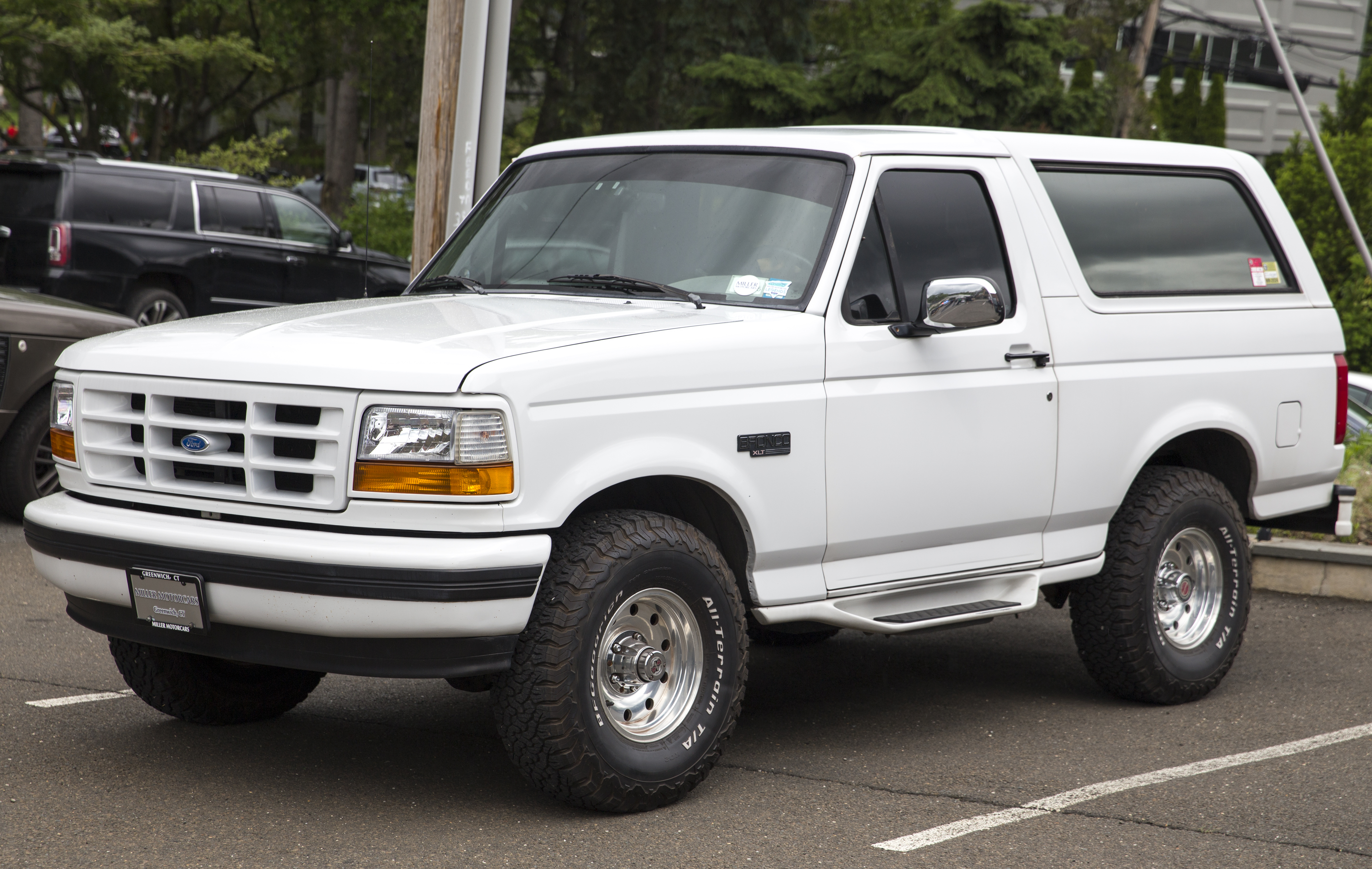

Overview
- Production: 1991–1996
- Model years: 1992–1996
- Assembly: United States: Wayne, Michigan (Michigan Assembly Plant); Venezuela: Valencia, Carabobo (Valencia Assembly)

Body and chassis
- Class: Full-size SUV
- Body style: 3-door SUV

Powertrain
- Engine: 300 cu in (4.9 L) Straight-6 (1992); 302 cu in (4.9 L) 302 V8; 351 cu in (5.8 L) Windsor V8
- Transmission: 4-speed AOD-E automatic 4-speed E4OD automatic 5-speed M5OD-R2 manual

Dimensions
- Wheelbase: 104.7 in (2,659 mm)
- Length: 183.6 in (4,663 mm)
- Width: 79.1 in (2,009 mm)
- Height: 1995–1996: 74.4 in (1,890 mm); 1992–1994: 74.5 in (1,892 mm)

For the 1992 model year, the fifth-generation Bronco followed the design development of the ninth-generation Ford F-150. Again retaining the chassis introduced for the 1980 model year, the front fascia of the Bronco adopted additional aerodynamic revisions. While designed with a larger grille, front bumper, and headlight units, the front fascia was given a slightly rounded design.

=== Model changes ===
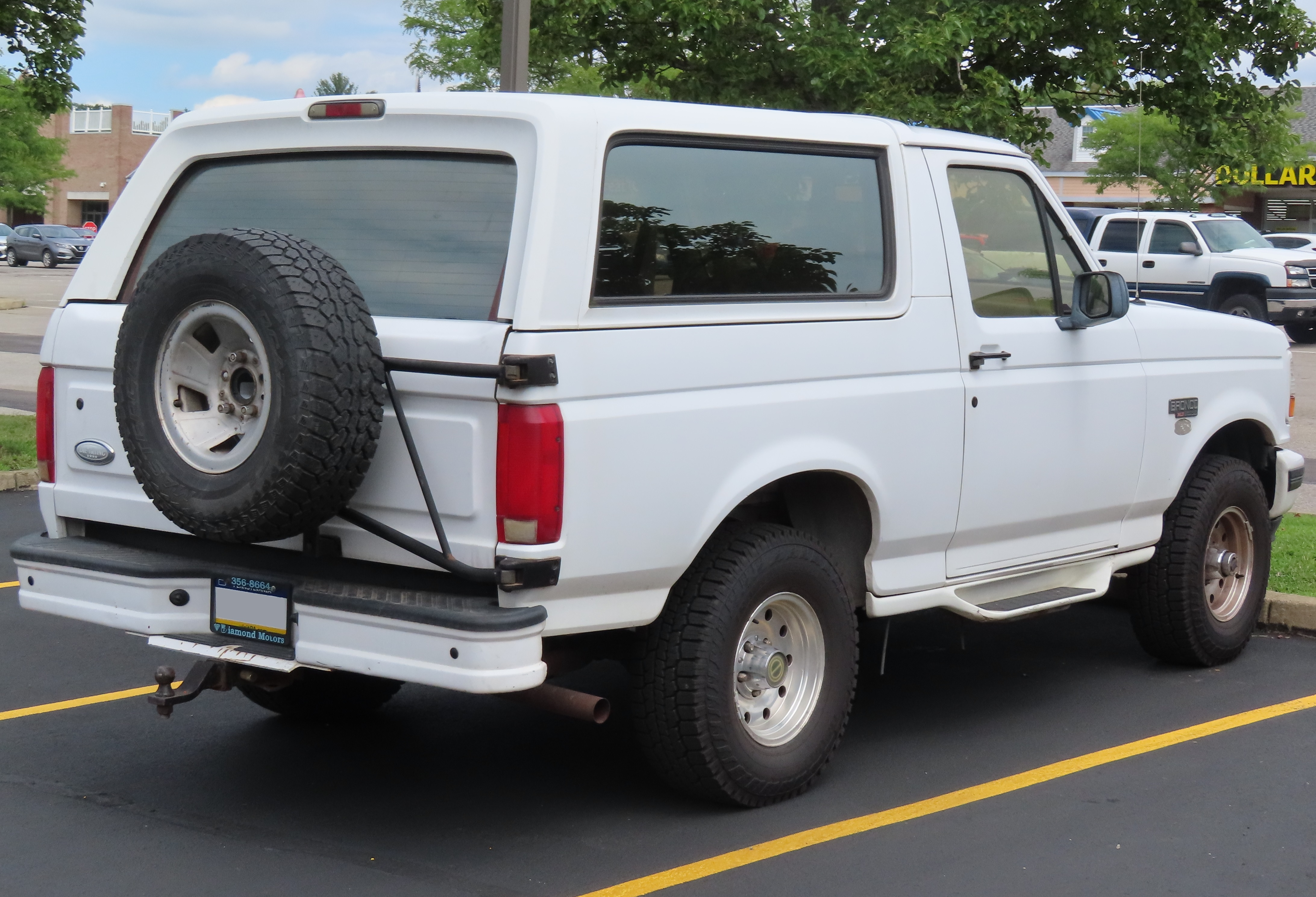
1995 Ford Bronco XLT, rear view

The interior again saw updates to the dashboard and instrument panel, with the addition of leather front seats as an option for XLT and Eddie Bauer trims as well as optional remote keyless entry with an anti-theft alarm. Maroon and blue leather seats were offered from 1992 through the end of production. After having power windows and locks as an option throughout the 1980s, power mirrors were offered for the first time for 1992. For 1996, the Ford Bronco became the first Ford vehicle to incorporate turn signal lights into its side mirrors.

The fifth generation introduced additional changes related to safety. 4-wheel anti-lock braking system (ABS) replaced rear-wheel ABS for 1993, with a driver-side airbag introduced for 1994. The redesign included a safety front crumple zone into the frame and a center-mounted brake light to the hardtop; the hardtop was now the mounting point of 3-point seatbelts for the rear passengers.

In the aftermath of the safety upgrades, the Bronco was no longer able to be marketed as a lift-off hardtop (from a legal standpoint). While still physically possible, the hardtop contained the upper mounts for the now required 3 point seatbelts and the required center brake light was mounted above the rear window on this hardtop (unlike Jeep mounting the 3rd brake light to the spare tire). To discourage owners from removing the hardtop, Ford removed all literature in the vehicle owner's manual related to its removal. To further inhibit its removal, Ford secured the hardtop in place with #40 Security Torx bolts, instead of the standard bolts used on previous model years. Removal of the hardtop could lead to a traffic citation, for tampering with the center brake light and/or inoperable rear seatbelts, depending on local and state laws.

=== Powertrain ===
The fifth-generation Bronco carried over the previous 4.9L inline-6, 5.0L V8, and the 5.8L H.O. V8 engines from the previous generation. For 1994, the Bronco became powered solely by V8 engines, as the 4.9L inline-6 was withdrawn from the model line. For 1996, the two V8 powertrains became OBD-II compliant.

=== Special editions ===
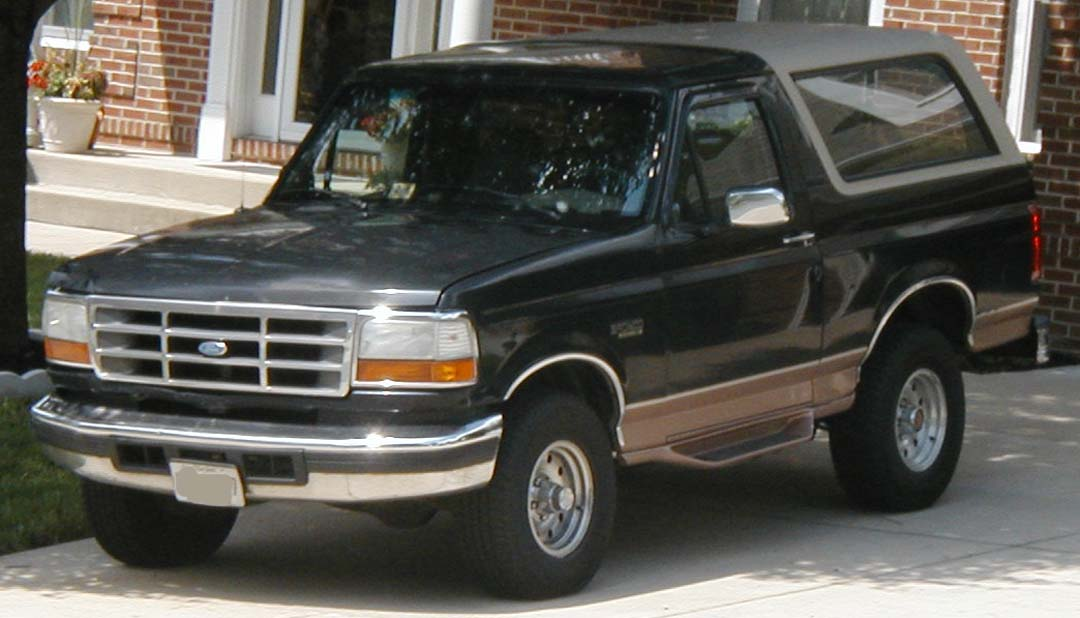
1995–1996 Ford Bronco Eddie Bauer

The monochrome Nite edition was again available, though 1992 was its last offering. Monochrome paint versions were reintroduced from 1993 (1994 model) to 1996, as the XLT Sport variant of the Bronco available in black, red, or white. Another variant of the XLT was a two-tone light teal green and white (charcoal gray interior); approximately 600 were produced each year.

The Eddie Bauer outdoors-themed edition made its return, offered from 1992 to 1996. Again combining nearly every option for the Bronco with a trim-specific exterior and interior combination, the Bronco Eddie Bauer introduced an overhead console for 1994 along with lighted sun visors and an auto-dimming rearview mirror (both offered as option on the XLT). For 1995, the Eddie Bauer saw the addition of front bumper vents (added to the XLT for 1996).

=== Sales ===
1992–1996 Ford Bronco production
Year	Production
1992	25,516
1993	32,281
1994	33,083
1995	37,693
1996	34,130

=== Discontinuation ===
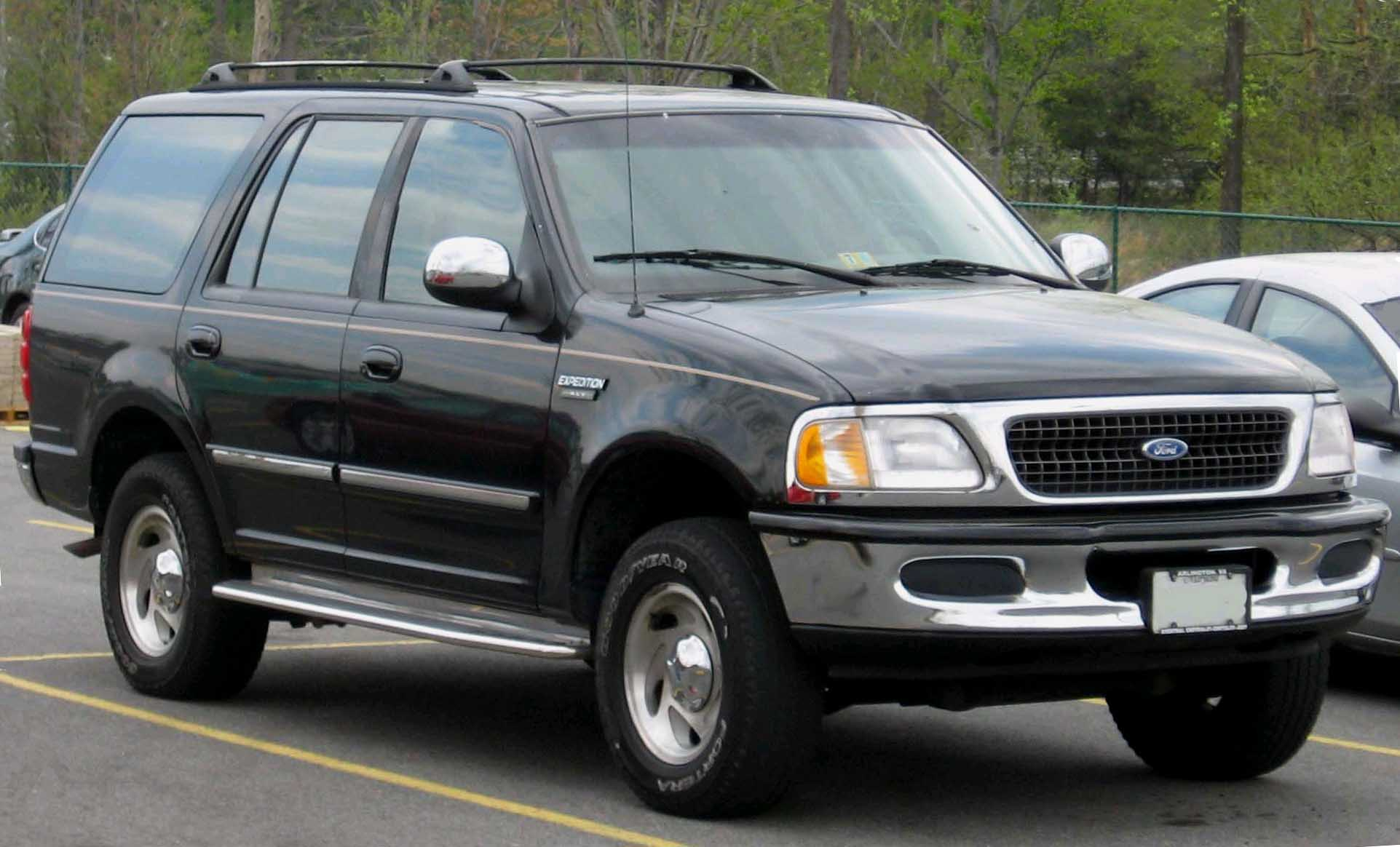
1997 Ford Expedition XLT

The last fifth-generation Bronco built rolled off the Wayne, Michigan assembly line on June 12, 1996. According to Ford, the discontinuation of the model line was unrelated to any stigma created from the then-recent O.J. Simpson police chase, as sales of the model line had been in decline previous to the incident. To better compete with the Chevrolet/GMC Suburban and the Chevrolet Tahoe/GMC Yukon, Ford introduced the Ford Expedition for 1997 to replace the Bronco.

Following the lineage of the 1978–1996 Bronco, the Expedition was derived from the tenth-generation F-150, but shifted from a two-door body with a lift-off hardtop to a five-door wagon/SUV body, slotted above the Ranger-based Ford Explorer.

=== Centurion Classic (1987–1996) ===
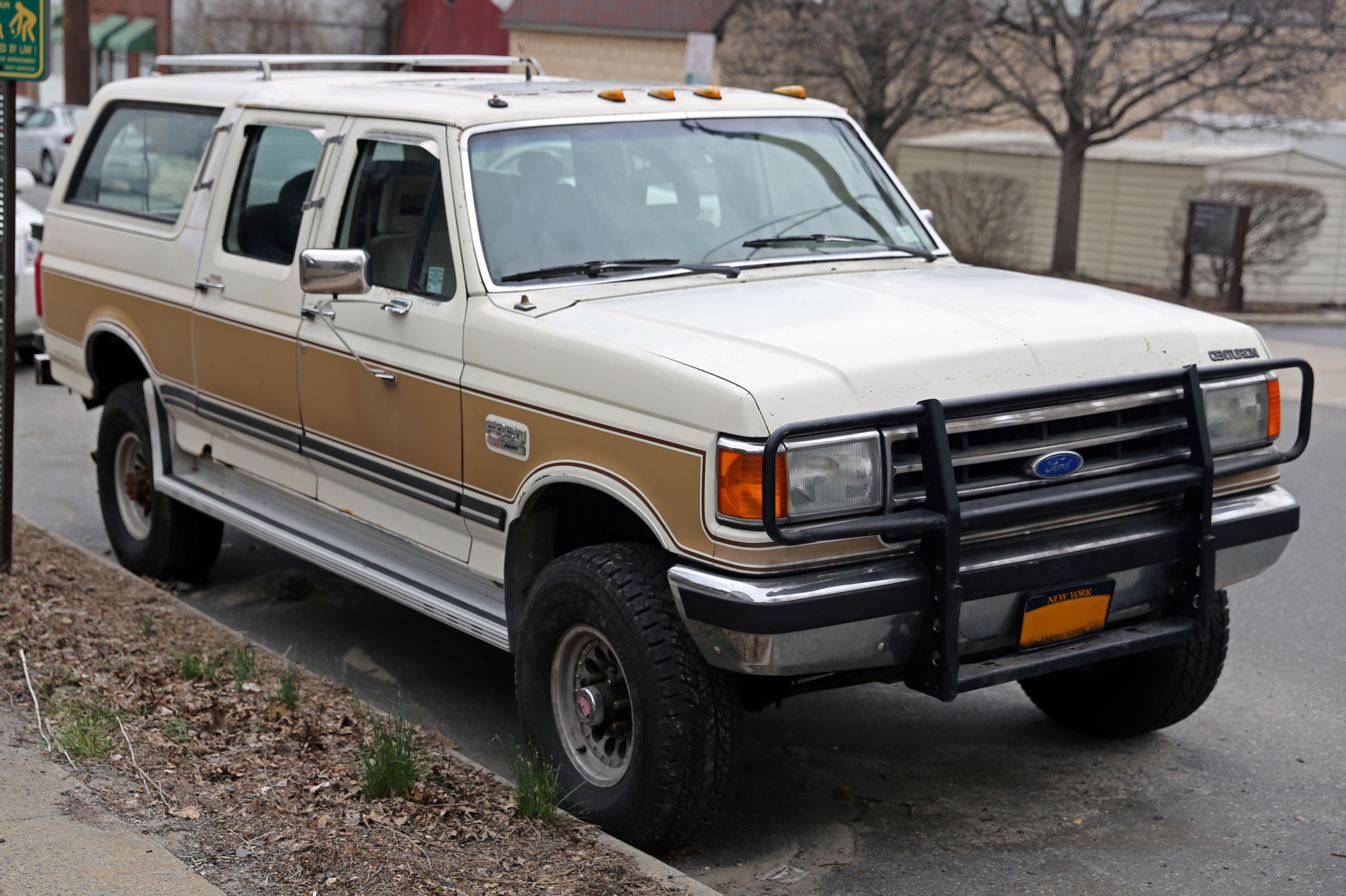
A 1989 Centurion Classic; a Ford F-350 crew cab mated with rear bodywork of a Bronco

A four-door Ford competitor for the Chevrolet Tahoe was not released until the introduction of the Expedition for the 1997 model year (and the 2000 Excursion, competing against the ¾-ton version known as the Chevrolet Suburban 2500). As the Bronco was produced solely as a two-door wagon after 1972, all four-door Broncos were developed and produced on a license-built basis by the aftermarket.

During the 1980s and early 1990s, Centurion Vehicles, a converter specializing in Ford trucks based in White Pigeon, Michigan, constructed the Centurion Classic, a four-door version of the fourth- and fifth-generation Bronco. In the construction of each Classic, Centurion would mate the cab of an F-Series crew-cab pickup (from the C-pillar forward) to body of a Bronco (from the B-pillar rearward), including the rear quarter panels, hardtop, and tailgate of the SUV. Early models used fiberglass rear body panels, but later, these were made from steel. As the body conversion retained the rear seat of the Bronco, a Centurion Classic was equipped with three-row seating for up to nine people.

Centurion Vehicles offered two models of the Classic: the C-150 (based on the Ford F-150 chassis, with optional four-wheel drive) and the C-350 (based on the F-350, four-wheel drive was standard). Both models used a 140-inch wheelbase (9 inches longer than the Suburban); as the F-150 was not produced as a crew cab, a C-150 was constructed from three different vehicles (crew cab, Bronco rear, and F-150 frame). In contrast to the ¾-ton Suburban 2500, the C-350 Classic utilized a one-ton chassis. The C-150 was offered with 5.0L and 5.8L V8 engines; the C-350 used the 7.3L diesel V8 and 7.5L gasoline V8 (the only Bronco variants to use these engines).

The Centurion Classic was offered until the end of Bronco production in 1996; though the Bronco was directly replaced by the Expedition, the C-150/C-350 is closest in size to the Ford Excursion introduced for the 2000 model year. As of current production, the C-350 is the only SUV produced on a one-ton chassis (the 2000–2005 Ford Excursion was produced on a ¾-ton chassis).

=== O.J. Simpson chase ===
The white Ford Bronco XLT that Al Cowlings drove in the O.J. Simpson police pursuit, on display at the Alcatraz East museum

The Ford Bronco gained notoriety on June 17, 1994, when Al Cowlings drove his white 1993 Bronco XLT with his accused friend O.J. Simpson in the back seat, in a low-speed police chase on Interstate 405, ending in his eventual surrender. The incident was simulcast on television worldwide, with approximately 95 million North Americans watching live.

== Sixth generation (U725; 2021) ==
Sixth generation
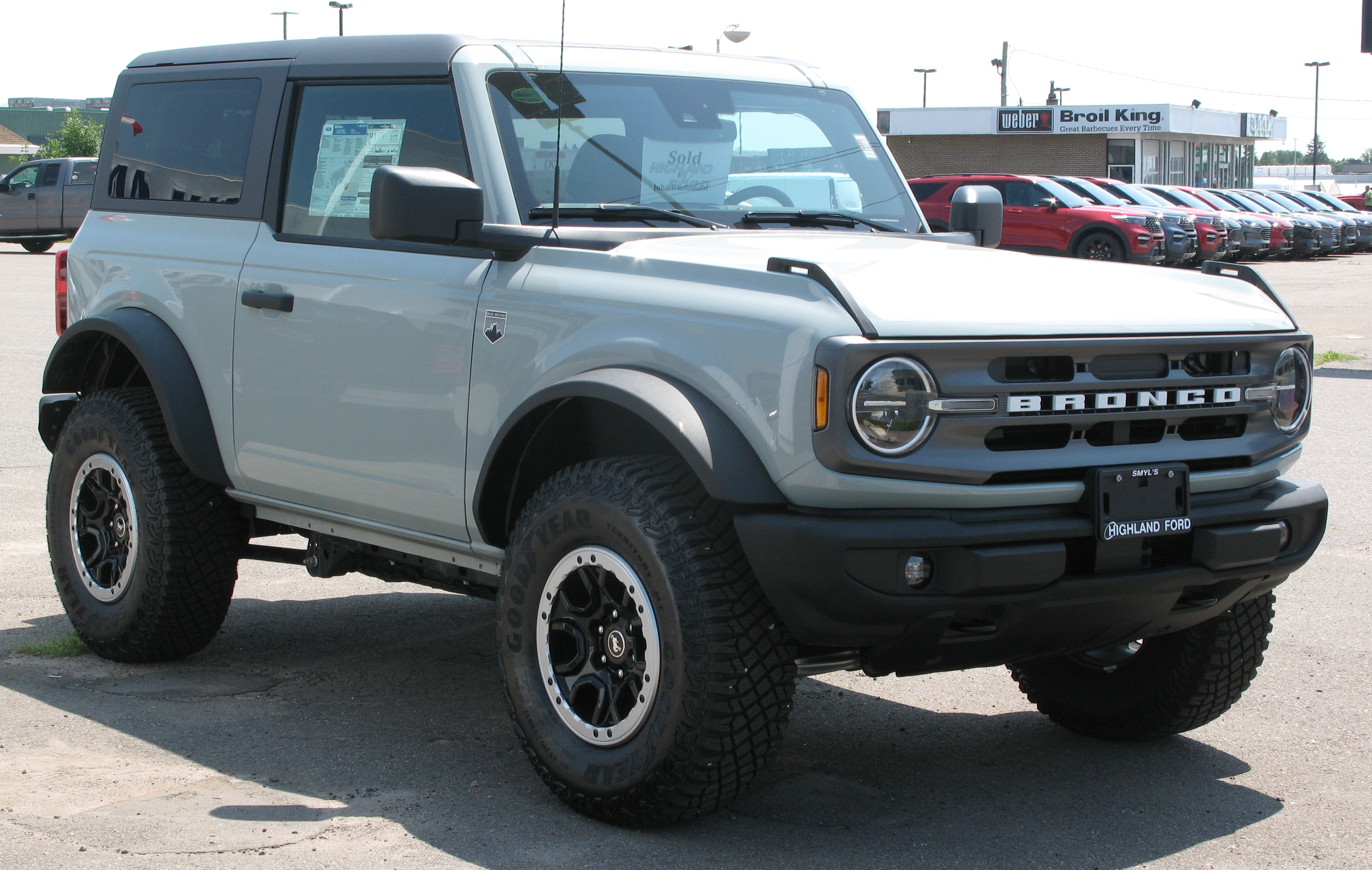
- 2021 Ford Bronco 2-door Big Bend

Overview
- Model code: U725
- Production: June 2021 – present
- Model years: 2021–present
- Assembly: United States: Wayne, Michigan (Michigan Assembly); China: Nanchang (Jiangling Ford Auto)
- Designer: Paul Wraith (chief program designer, 2018); Robert Gelardi (design manager, 2018); Daniel Kangas (Bronco R, 2019)

Body and chassis
- Class: Mid-size SUV
- Body style: 2-door convertible SUV; 4-door convertible SUV
- Platform: Ford T6
- Related: Ford Ranger (T6)

Powertrain
- Engine: Gasoline: 2.3 L EcoBoost turbo I4; 2.7 L EcoBoost twin-turbo V6; 3.0 L EcoBoost twin-turbo V6
- Power output: 300 hp (304 PS; 224 kW) (2.3); 330 hp (335 PS; 246 kW) (2.7); 418 hp (424 PS; 312 kW) (3.0)
- Transmission: 7-speed Getrag MTI550 manual (2.3 only); 10-speed Ford 10R60 automatic

Dimensions
- Wheelbase: 100.4 in (2,550 mm) (2-door); 116.1 in (2,949 mm) (4-door)
- Length: 174.8 in (4,440 mm) (2-door); 189.4–190.5 in (4,811–4,839 mm) (4-door)
- Width: 75.9–79.3 in (1,928–2,014 mm)
- Height: 70.2–71.4 in (1,783–1,814 mm)
- Curb weight: 4,294–4,699 lb (1,948–2,131 kg) (2-door); 4,466–5,109 lb (2,026–2,317 kg) (4-door)

Ford released its sixth generation Bronco for the 2021 model year, after a 25-year hiatus of the Bronco nameplate. Styling recalls many elements from the 1966–1977 series, and the design chief's 1976 Bronco was digitally scanned as a reference during the design process. Created as a direct competitor to the Jeep Wrangler, the Bronco is offered in a two and four door SUV configuration, each reconfigurable as a convertible. Similar to a Wrangler, the doors can easily be removed, but unlike the Jeep's, the Bronco's doors are frameless, and with the door-glass wound down, the doors can be carried in dedicated covers within the vehicle, while riding door-less. A "Bronco" and a "bucking horse" emblem on the tailgate and steering wheel replace the Ford Blue Oval emblem. The Bronco is now a mid-size SUV, bringing its chassis and powertrain closer in size to the Ford Ranger.

=== Background ===
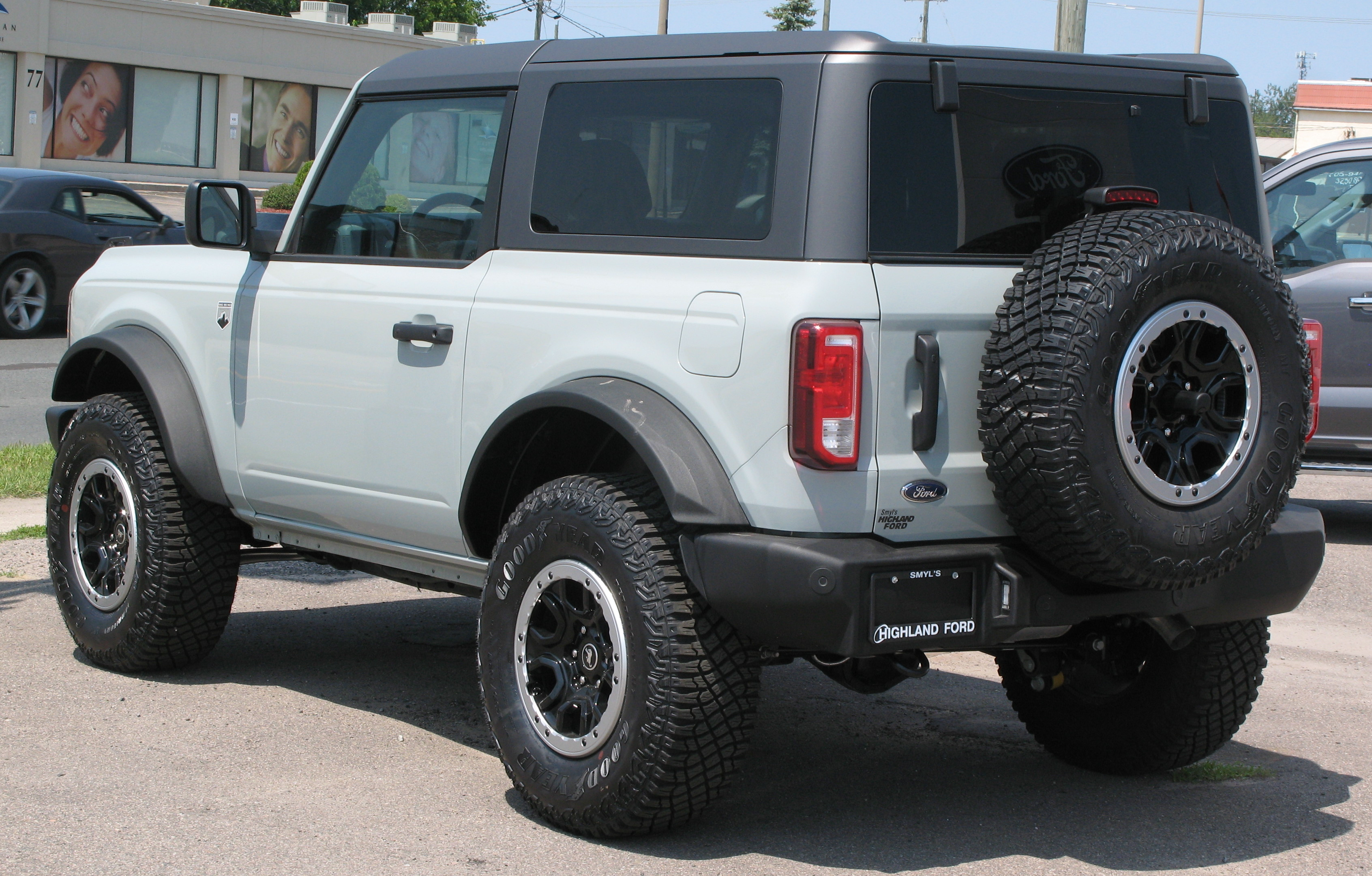
2021 Bronco 2-door Big Bend

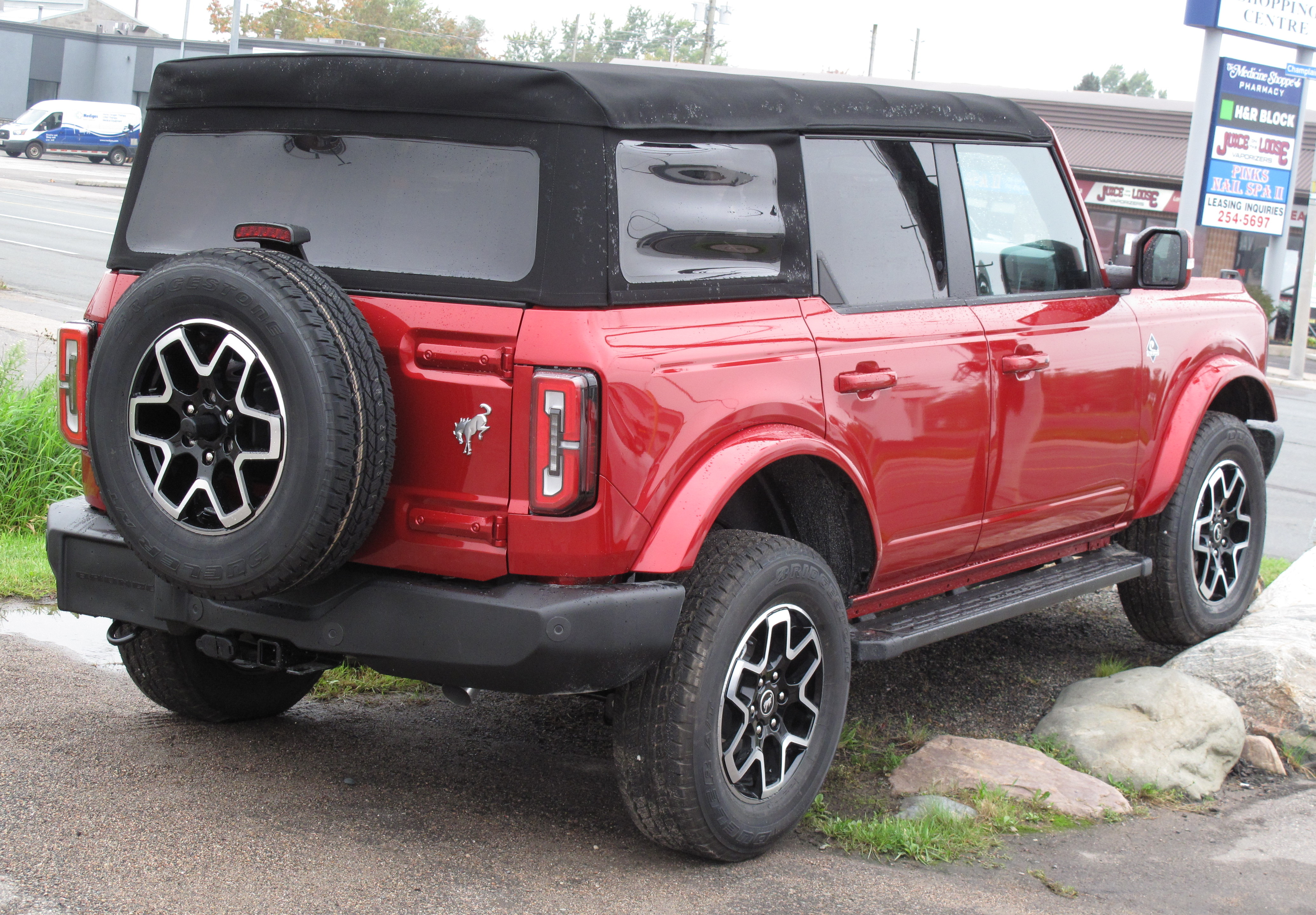
2021 Bronco 4-door Outer Banks

The potential revival of the Bronco came up in 2016 negotiations between Ford and the UAW. At the time, it was discussed that Michigan Assembly would cancel production of the fourth-generation Ford Focus and the C-Max, which would move to Mexico. The UAW ultimately announced the factory would remain open, to be retooled for the revival of the Ford Ranger in North America and the Ford Bronco. The Bronco was developed as Ford expected the Ranger would not be enough to fill factory capacity, and needed a second model to be built alongside it.

While Ford did not share future product plans with the UAW, the company confirmed the return of the Bronco at the 2017 North American International Auto Show. Packaged as a direct competitor to the Jeep Wrangler, Ford announced two and four-door variants. Intended for a 2021 model year release, the sixth generation would be based on the Ford Ranger, retaining body-on-frame construction. In contrast to the Ford Everest sold overseas, the Bronco would receive a distinct body recalling the first generation with further off-road capability.

Ford showed a pre-production prototype to a group of dealers in March 2019. On November 1, 2019, an announcement was made for a spring 2020 reveal, intended for the 2021 model year. Originally scheduled for a March 2020 unveiling, the Bronco was unveiled on July 13, 2020, following multiple delays, mostly in relation to the global COVID-19 pandemic; Ford unintentionally scheduled the unveiling for July 9 (the date of O.J. Simpson's birthday). On March 27, 2021, at the Barrett-Jackson Scottsdale Auto Auction, the first production Bronco, a First Edition, sold for $1,075,000 (~$1.28 million in 2025) with all the funds going to a charity Ford helped establish to help preserve forests.

When the reveal officially premiered, Ford accepted $100 (~$119.00 in 2025) reservations, with production scheduled for 2021.

The first production units rolled off the assembly line, on Monday, June 14, 2021 at Michigan Assembly Plant in Wayne, Michigan, the production facility of the previous five generations.

The take rate for the seven-speed manual transmission was reported to be around 15% for the initial orders.

=== Specifications ===
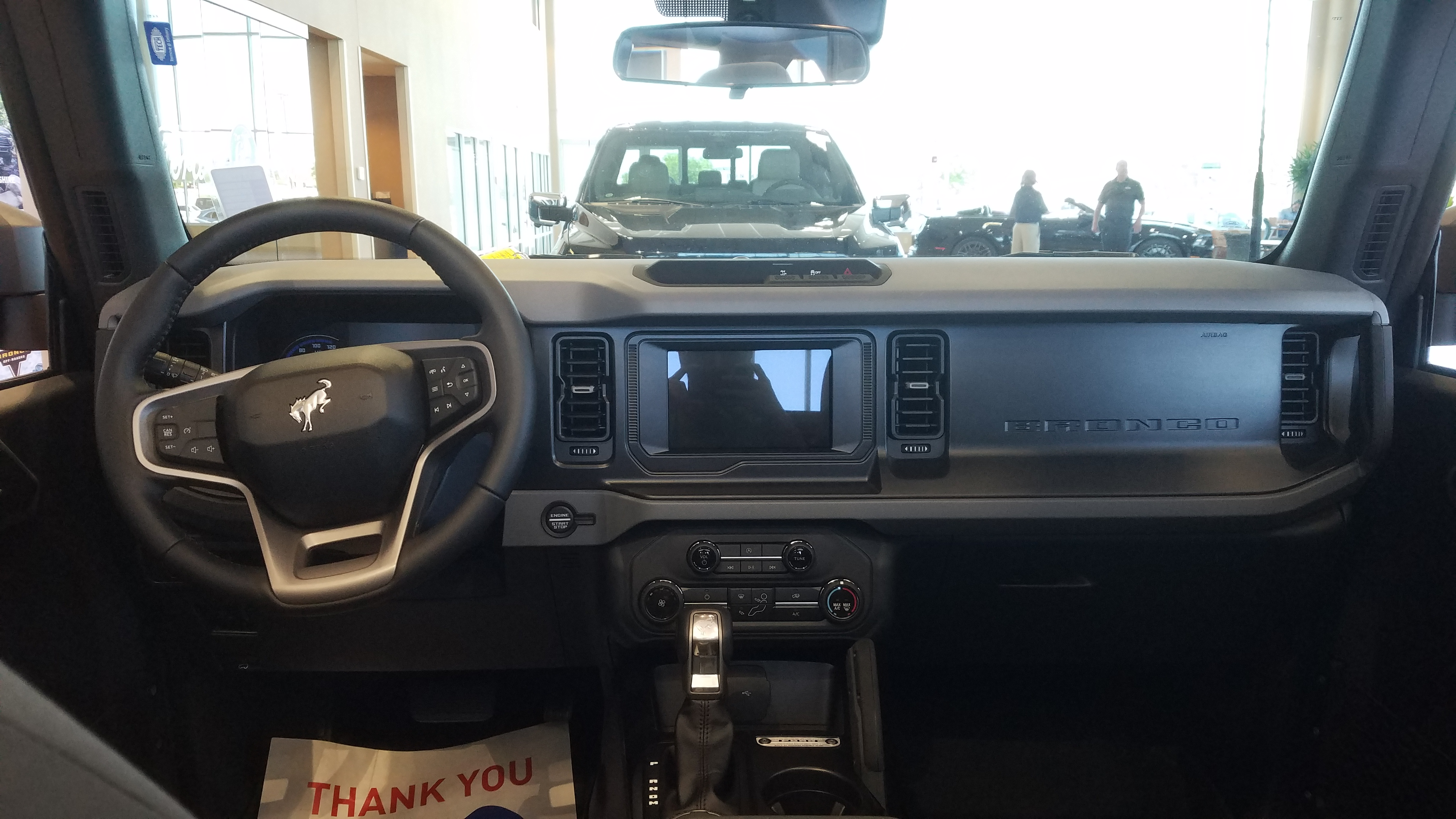
Interior

The standard engine is a 2.3-liter turbocharged EcoBoost inline-four that makes 300 hp (304 PS; 224 kW) and 325 lb⋅ft (441 N⋅m; 45 kg⋅m) of torque. A 2.7-liter twin-turbocharged EcoBoost V6 is optional; the larger variant makes 330 hp (335 PS; 246 kW) and 415 lb⋅ft (563 N⋅m; 57 kg⋅m) of torque. The 2.7-liter V6 is only available with a 10-speed automatic transmission while the 2.3-liter can be mated with either the 10-speed automatic or a standard 7-speed Getrag manual. Despite the nomenclature, the Getrag transmission is not a true seven-speed transmission, instead being a traditional six-speed unit with a dedicated crawler gear (the "C" on the shift knob) as the "seventh gear".

Recalling the original Bronco Roadster, removable doors with frameless glass combined with a detachable roof allow open-air driving on both two- and four-door models, and boast 11.6 in (295 mm) ground clearance. Doors can be user-removed and stored in the rear cargo area. The mirrors are attached to the body cowl instead of on the doors, allowing the user to remove the doors and still have the mirrors attached to the vehicle. The leading edge of the front fenders feature raised black brackets, called trail sights, to facilitate navigation and serve as tie-downs and accessory mounts.

The body-on-frame construction uses front twin A-arm independent suspension and a rear five-link coilover suspension and a solid axle. The optional HOSS (High-Performance Off-Road Stability Suspension) setup replaces these with position-sensitive Bilstein shocks, with multiple compression and rebound zones, at all four corners. On the Badlands trim, the front sway bar features a hydraulic disconnect to increase articulation when crawling, automatically reconnecting when brought back to speed. An option package, marketed as Sasquatch, includes a mild suspension lift, and 35-inch tires - the largest of any production vehicle besides the upcoming 3rd generation Ford Raptor, which has optional 37-inch tires.

Standard equipment includes Dana axles with front and rear electronic differentials, both user-lockable via dashboard switches. The drivetrain can toggle between 4WD Low, 4WD High, 4WD Automatic, and 2WD High (rear-wheel drive), controlled by a dial near the gear selector rather than a secondary shifter aside the main shift lever.

Optional equipment includes a terrain management system, marketed as "G.O.A.T. Modes" (Goes Over Any Type of Terrain). The system calibrates throttle response, four-wheel drive, traction control, and transmission shifts to maximize traction when offroading. Up to seven modes are available with this system: Normal, Eco, Sport, Slippery, and Sand, along with Baja, Mud and Ruts, and Rock Crawl. The available Trail One-Pedal Drive automatically applies and holds the brakes when the driver lifts off the gas pedal, removing the need for left-foot braking and preventing unexpected rollbacks. The sixth-generation Bronco also offers optional Trail Turn Assist, which uses the brake control solenoids to help the vehicle turn in tight offroad corners.

An optional topographical map software, marketed as Trail Maps, allows owners to share smartphone-downloaded topo maps to the vehicle's In-car entertainment system and record videos of trail runs, display telemetry or map data, and upload to the cloud. The sixth generation features a tray that slides from under the rear cargo compartment. An action mount on the front dash to allow for phone and camera mounting, waterproof switches and rubber floors are also available.

=== Bronco Raptor ===
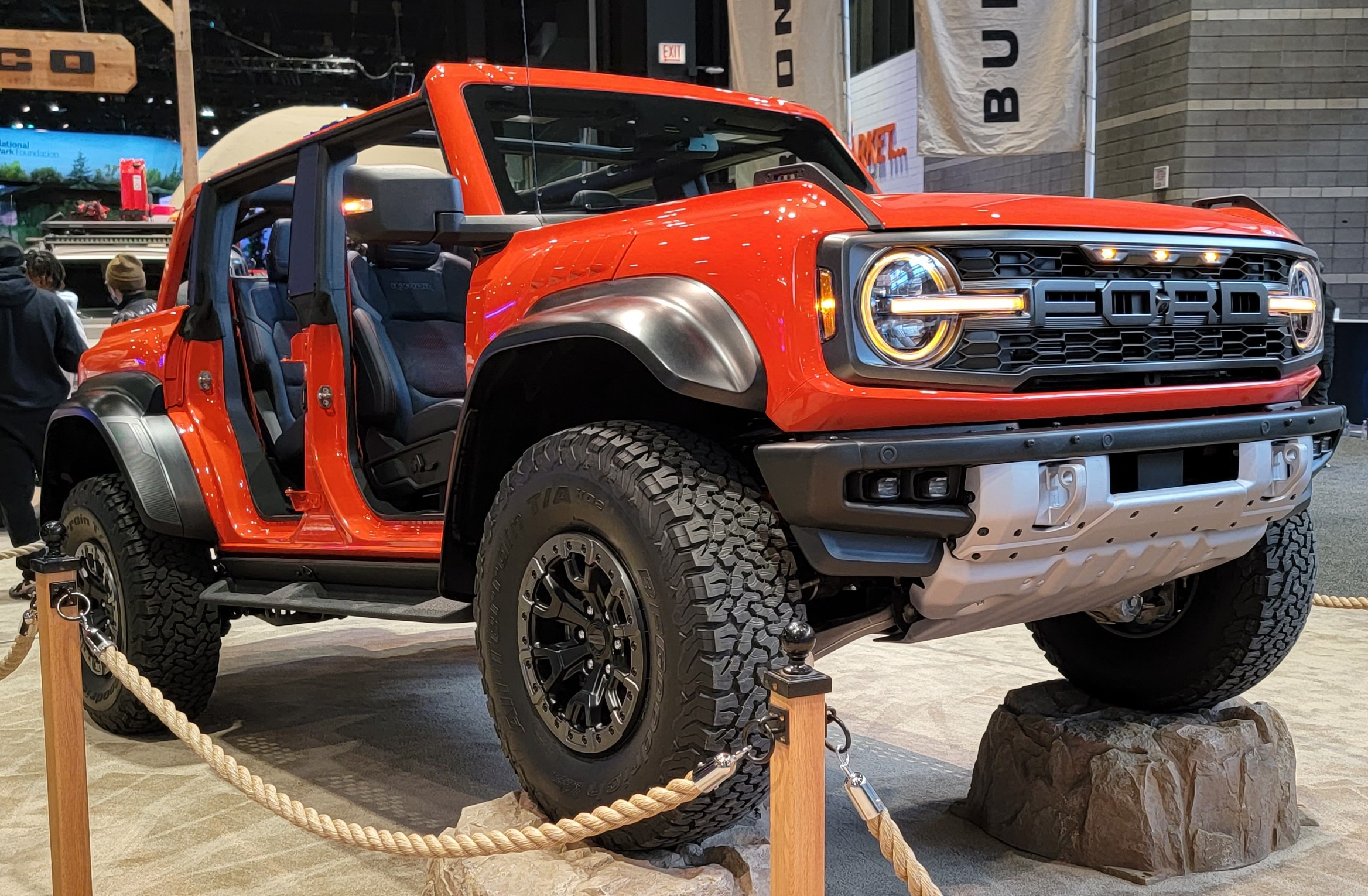
2023 Bronco Raptor

Ford announced a Raptor trim level for 2022 in a 4-door version only. Developed by Ford Performance, the Bronco Raptor has a EcoBoost 3.0 TT V6 with a "Baja Mode", making 418 hp (424 PS; 312 kW) and 440 lb⋅ft (597 N⋅m) of torque. The vehicle also has an upgraded cooling system, which allows the Bronco Raptor to run better in higher temperatures.

The Bronco Raptor is also wider at 85.7 inches (2,180 mm) and sits on a new FOX suspension with 13.1 inches (330 mm) of ground clearance (1.6 inches (41 mm) more than the Bronco with the Sasquatch package). Many other components in the Bronco Raptor have been upgraded or added such as stronger axles, more rigid cross bars, a dual exhaust with several different exhaust modes, 37 inch tires, a higher strength frame, reinforced front bumper, larger drive shafts for increased wheel torque, better brakes (from the F-150 Raptor), Ford nameplate grille (unlike Bronco on other trims), and a tow/haul mode. The Bronco Raptor is capable of towing 4,500 pounds (2,000 kg), which is 1,000 pounds (450 kg) more than the standard Bronco. Due to the Bronco Raptor's width, there is additional government-mandated lighting. The interior of the Bronco Raptor is also different from other trims, with unique "code orange" accents and stitching, additional bolstering to the seats with Raptor embroidered stitching, carbon fiber trim, a thicker steering wheel, magnesium paddle shifters, a leather stitched dashboard, and a larger center touchscreen.

=== Trim levels ===
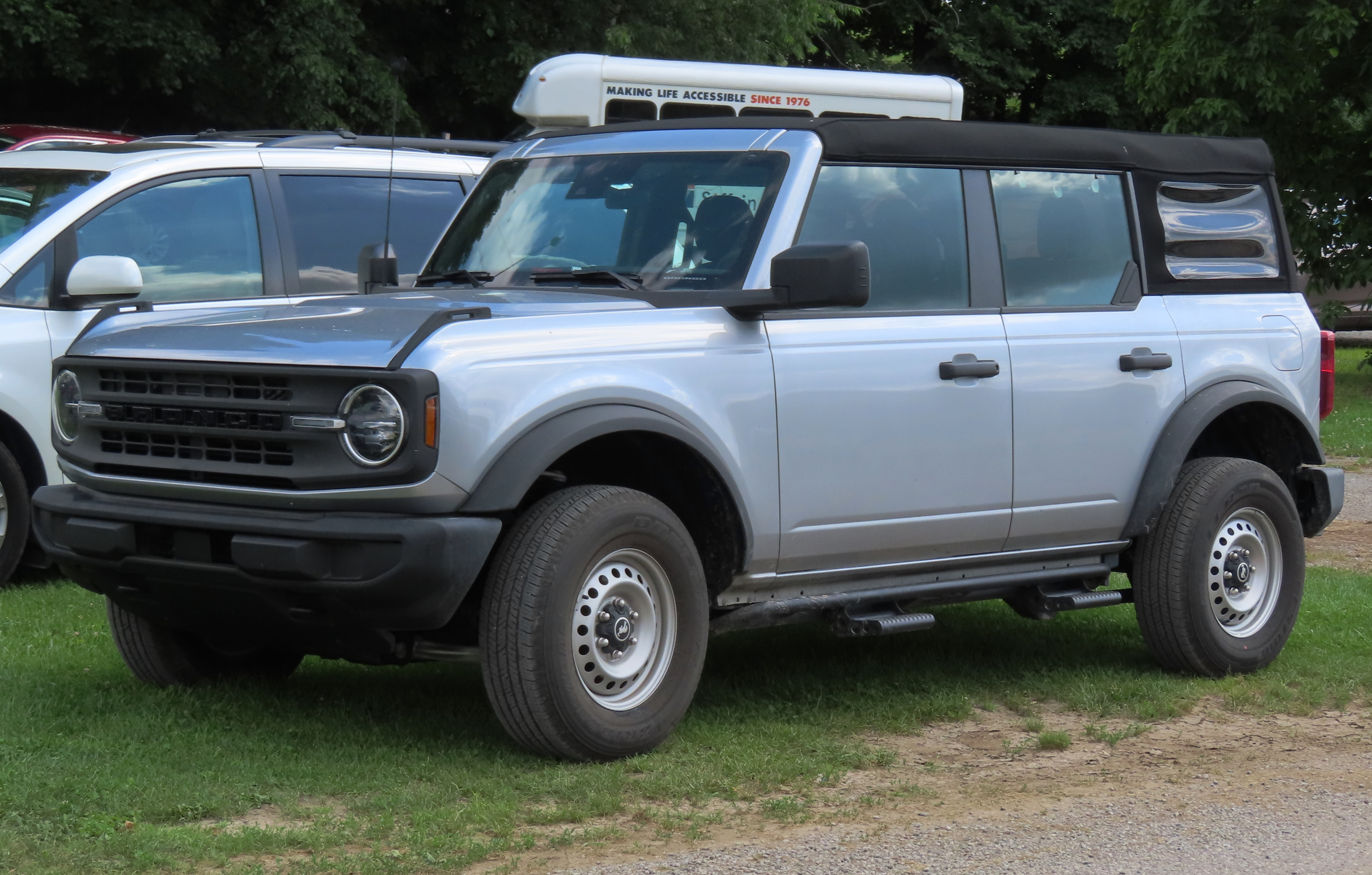
Bronco Base

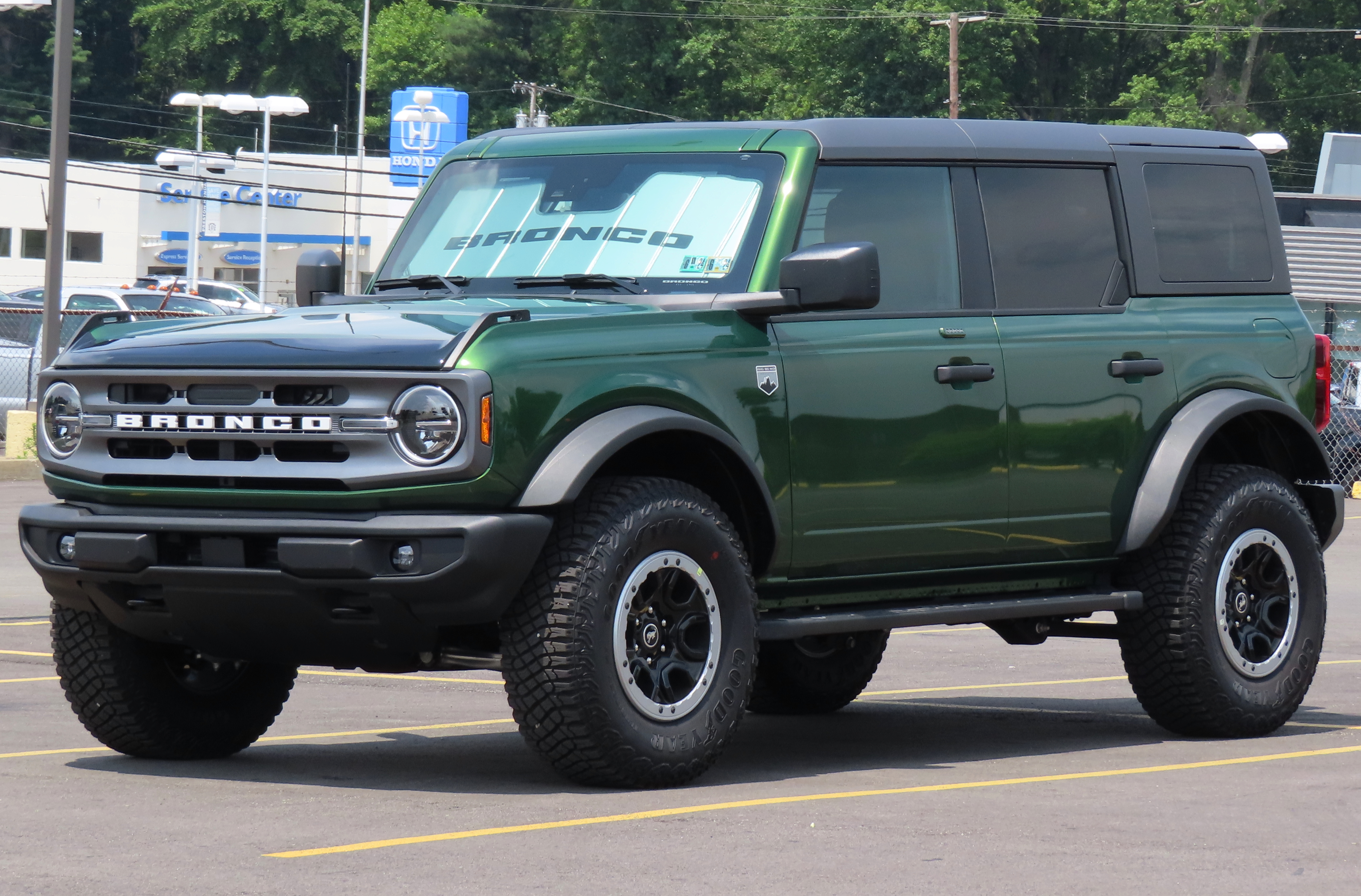
Bronco Big Bend with Sasquatch Package

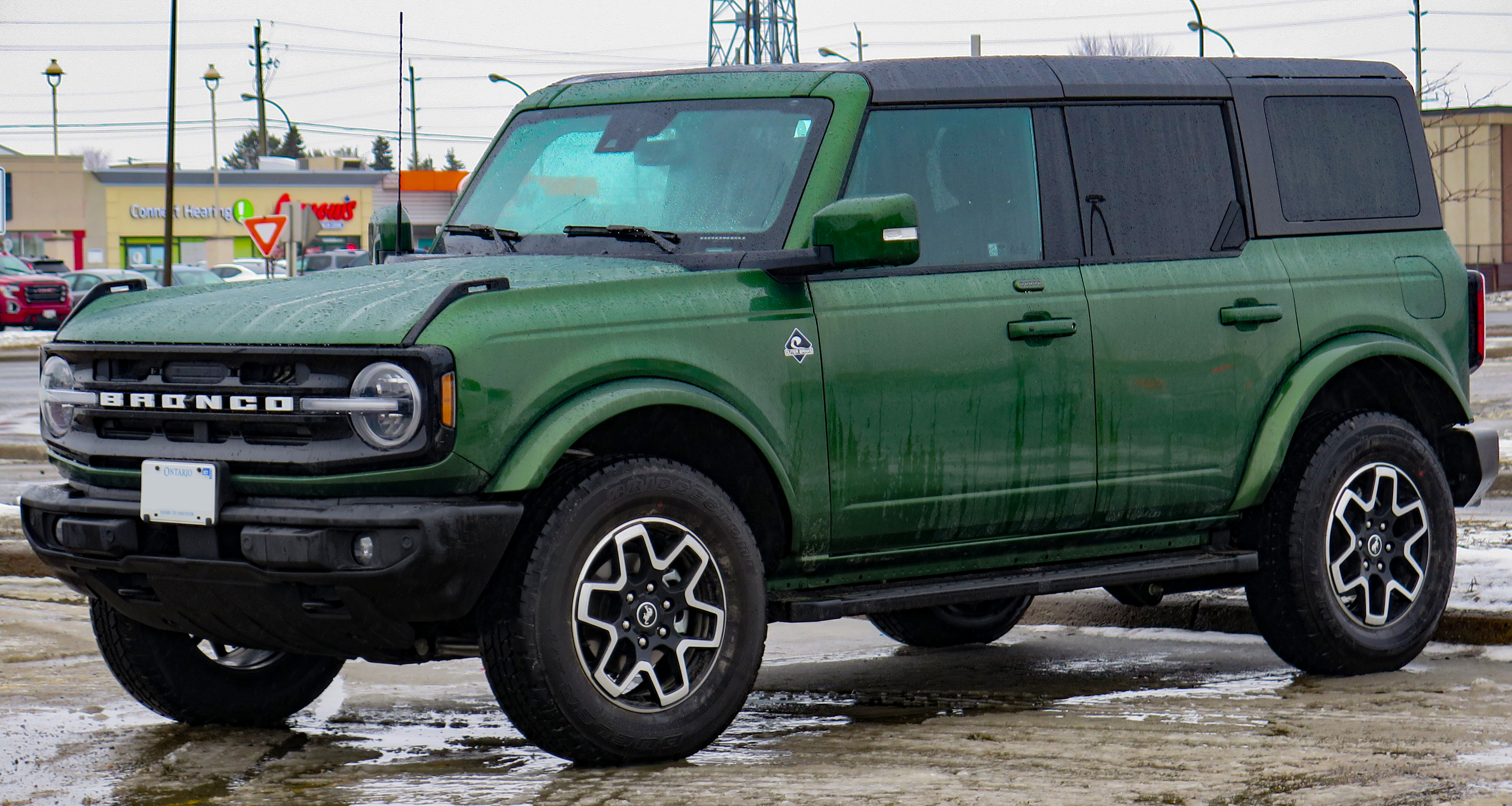
Bronco Outer Banks

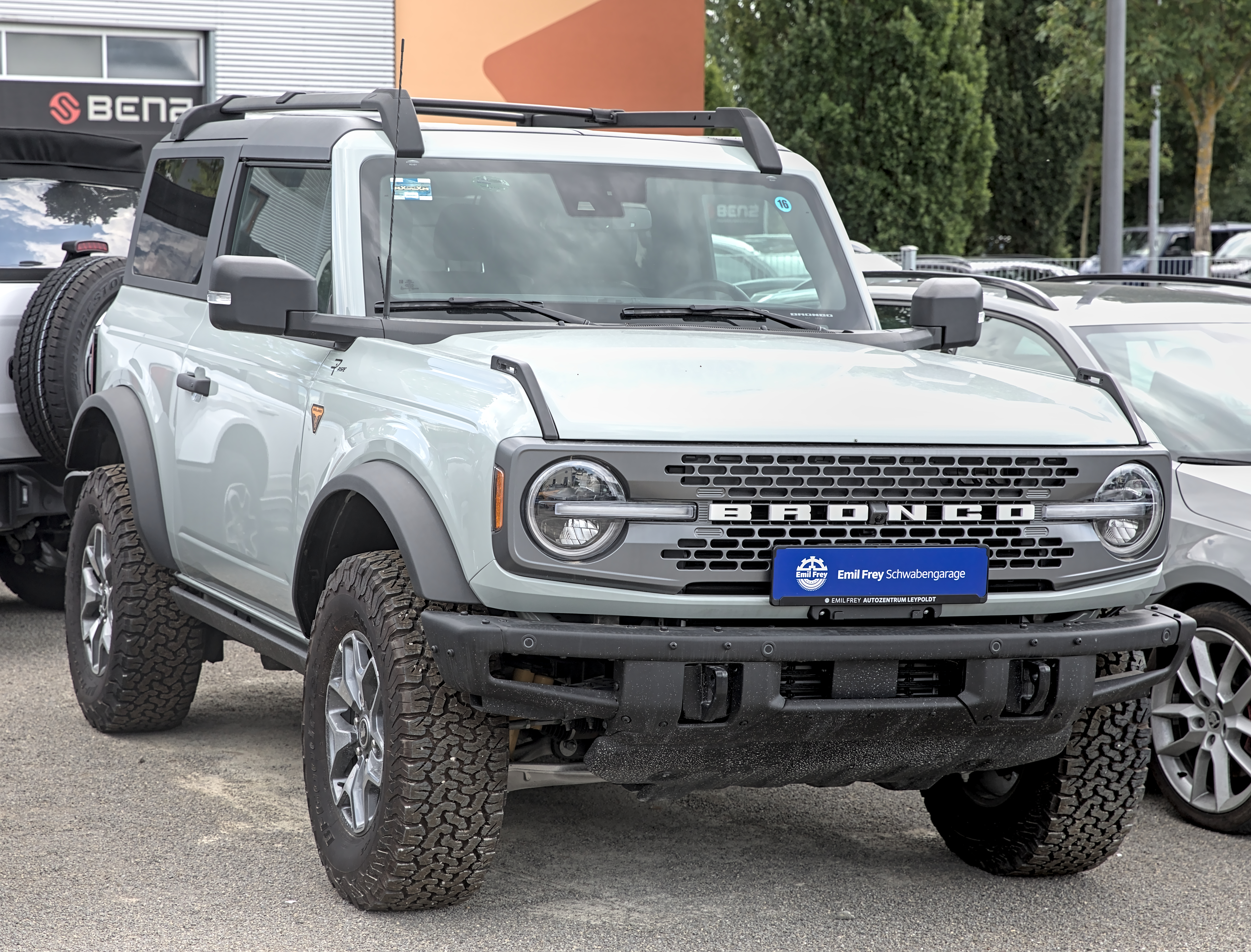
Bronco Badlands

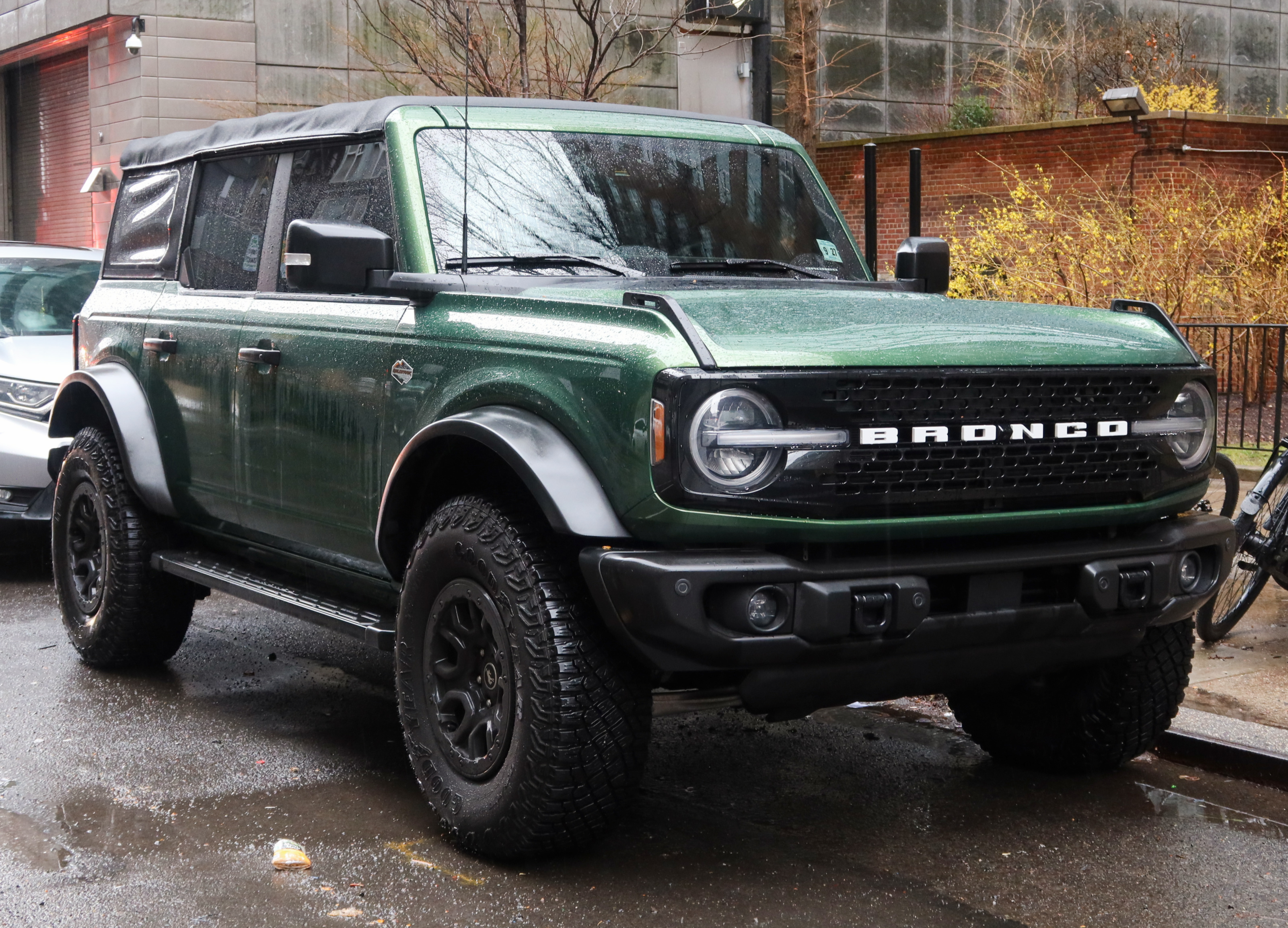
Bronco Wildtrak

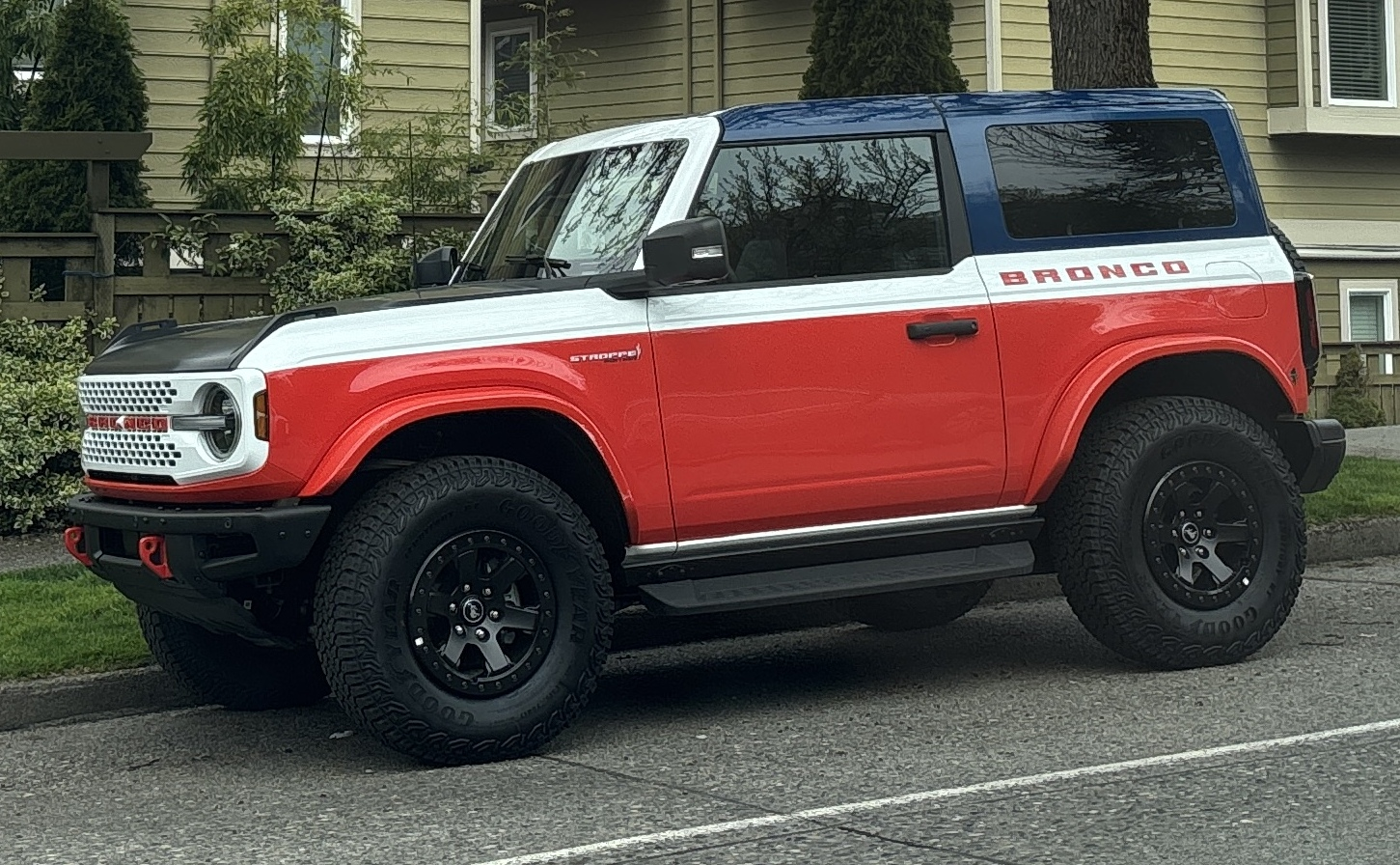
Bronco Stroppe Edition

The Bronco is available in several trim levels:

- The entry-level trim of the Bronco is known as the Base. Available as either a two-door or a four-door model, the Base comes equipped with the 2.3-liter EcoBoost twin-scroll turbocharged inline four-cylinder (I4) gasoline engine mated to a seven-speed manual transmission, the SYNC 4 eight-inch touchscreen infotainment system with wired and wireless Apple CarPlay and Android Auto smartphone integration, a six-speaker audio system, SiriusXM Satellite Radio, a 4G LTE wireless modem, cloth seating surfaces, air conditioning, sixteen-inch silver-painted steel wheels with 30" tires, and keyless entry.
- The Big Bend trim level of the Bronco, available as either a two-door or a four-door model, adds more convenience and styling features to the Base trim, including seventeen-inch Carbonized Gray-finished aluminum-alloy wheels with 32" tires and a leather-wrapped steering wheel and gear lever.
- The Black Diamond trim level of the Bronco is marketed as the "rugged" trim level of the Bronco lineup. Available as either a two-door or a four-door model, the Black Diamond adds features to the Big Bend trim such as seventeen-inch black-painted steel wheels with 32" tires, marine-grade vinyl-trimmed seating surfaces, a powder coated steel front bumper with LED front fog lamps and tow hooks, and rubberized flooring with drain plugs.
- The Outer Banks trim level of the Bronco, available as either a two-door or a four-door model, is the luxury-oriented trim level of the Bronco lineup. Added standard equipment to the Big Bend trim level includes eighteen-inch machined-face aluminum-alloy wheels with 32" tires, dual heated front bucket seats, powder coated side steps, and LED front headlamps and fog lamps.
- The Badlands is one of three off-road oriented Bronco trim levels. Available as either a two-door or a four-door model, the Badlands trim adds features onto the Outer Banks trim level such as seventeen-inch Carbonized Gray-finished aluminum-alloy wheels with 33" tall tires, additional G.O.A.T. modes for the four wheel drive system, upgraded HOSS 2.0 suspension with Bilstein dampers, a front stabilizer bar disconnect, a powder coated steel front bumper with integrated LED front fog lamps and tow hooks, and marine-grade vinyl-trimmed seating surfaces.
- The First Edition model, based on the equipment of the Badlands trim and available as either a two-door or a four-door model, was available for the 2021 model year. Production was initially limited to only 7,000 units, although Ford later increased the amount of First Edition Broncos it would build due to increased demand.
- The Wildtrak is another off-road oriented Bronco trim level available through the 2024 model year. Available as either a two-door or a four-door model, the Wildtrak trim adds features onto the Badlands trim level such as the Sasquatch Package, the 2.7-liter EcoBoost twin-turbocharged V6 gasoline engine mated to a ten-speed automatic transmission, upgraded HOSS 3.0 suspension with Fox dampers, a unique front hood graphic, cloth seating surfaces, and dual heated front bucket seats.
- The Everglades trim, available for the 2022 model year and available only as a four-door model, is a special-edition model based on the standard equipment of the rugged Black Diamond trim, but adds unique front fender graphics that double as a depth meter for fording water, unique aluminum-alloy wheels, a heavy-duty modular front bumper, and the SYNC 4A twelve-inch touchscreen infotainment system with wired and wireless Apple CarPlay and Android Auto smartphone integration and SiriusXM Satellite Radio with 360L.
- The Raptor, introduced for the 2022 model year and only available as a four-door model, is the top-tier Bronco trim level. The Raptor trim adds features onto the Wildtrak trim level such as 37" tall tires and beadlock-capable aluminum-alloy wheels, the 3.0-liter EcoBoost twin-turbocharged V6 gasoline engine mated to a ten-speed automatic transmission, a heavy-duty modular front bumper with Rigid Industries-branded front fog lamps, marine-grade vinyl-trimmed seating surfaces with cloth inserts, specially-bolstered front bucket seats, a 360-degree off-road camera system, the SYNC 4A twelve-inch touchscreen infotainment system with wired and wireless Apple CarPlay and Android Auto smartphone integration and SiriusXM Satellite Radio with 360L, and heavy-duty steel bash plates. The Raptor is the second of three vehicles to join the Raptor lineup, following the Ford F-150 Raptor, and will also be followed by an all-new Ford Ranger Raptor model.
- The Stroppe Edition was introduced for the 2025 model year as a two-door model. It is named for racer Bill Stroppe who built approximately 400 Baja Broncos between 1971 and 1975. It features a Code Orange, Oxford White and Atlas Blue paint scheme reminiscent of the original Stroppe Baja Broncos, and sold for $77,665. For 2026, the Stroppe Edition was moved to the four-door model, and the price was reduced to $69,995.

=== China ===
The Chinese market Bronco (Chinese: 烈马; pinyin: liè mǎ; lit. 'wild/fierce horse') went on sale in January 2024. Produced by Jiangling Ford Auto, the Bronco received upgraded interior materials and quality to meet Chinese customers expectations. It is solely powered by the 2.3-liter Ecoboost turbocharged gasoline engine, and only the 4-door version is available. The infotainment system is also unique to the Chinese market with a Ford SYNC+ system that supports over-the-air software update, powered by a Qualcomm Snapdragon 8155 high-computing chip, 16 GB of RAM and 256 GB of internal storage. Trim levels available are base, Badlands and Everglades.

=== Sales ===
Year	U.S.	Canada	China
2021	35,023	4,261	—
2022	117,057	10,167	—
2023	105,665		—
2024	109,172		8,814
2025	146,007	9,747	6,784

== Concepts and prototypes ==
=== 1966 Bronco Dune Duster ===
For the 1965 Detroit Auto Show Ford constructed a special Bronco roadster. According to Ford,

A special, customized version of Ford Division's 1966 Bronco, the Dune Duster, will be displayed at the Detroit Auto Show from November 27 through December 5. The utility/sports-type vehicle was designed in Ford's Styling Center in Dearborn and built by Parris Kustom in North Hollywood, California. Exterior paint is a specially formulated Golden Saddle Pearl and modifications include an NHRA-approved roll bar with integral headrests, a windshield designed to complement the contour of the roll bar, walnut appliques on the rear side panels and exposed chrome exhaust pipes. Custom interior appointments include a walnut steering wheel and front bucket seats with russet suede bolsters and perforated leather cushions and seatbacks. The instrument panel is trimmed with suede padding and outfitted with walnut-trimmed control knobs. Jump seats have been added to the rear compartment over the wheels and a tonneau cover for rear compartment protection was added for attachment with quick-fastening snaps.

=== 1970 Bronco Wildflower ===
For 1970, Ford re-dressed the Dune Duster as the Wildflower, customized with luxury and safety features in addition to a "multi-colored paint treatment."

=== 1973 Big Bronco prototypes ===
In 1973, Ford Advanced Light Truck Engineering developed four future Ford Bronco prototypes. To better match the market success of the Chevrolet Blazer, Ford required its designers to shift from a dedicated chassis used by the model line to a shortened F-100 as the basis for a future Bronco. Dubbed "Project Shorthorn", the prototype was constructed using the top and tailgate from a Chevrolet K5 Blazer, mating it to a shortened-wheelbase F-100. While the use of Chevrolet components was used purely for proof of concept, further development by Ford adopted a half-cab design (one design objective was the use of F-Series doors, along with a removable top).

Project Shorthorn was among four prototypes, alongside Longhorn (a four-door wagon-style SUV, similar to the Chevrolet Suburban), Midhorn (sized between the Jeep Wagoneer and International Travelall; a precursor to the Chevrolet Tahoe), and the Widehorn (a wide-body F-100 4x4, a precursor to the Ford Raptor).

As the development of Project Shorthorn happened during the OPEC oil crisis, the model program was postponed to the 1978 model year as Ford sought a more promising outcome. While the Longhorn/Midhorn four-door wagons saw a positive response, they were ultimately shelved, as the Project Shorthorn was introduced for only a two-year production (before a full redesign). Ford would not produce a production four-door SUV until the 1991 Ford Explorer (smaller than the Midhorn) and the 1997 Ford Expedition (between the Midhorn and Longhorn in size).

=== 1981 Bronco Montana Lobo ===
Built on a 1977 Bronco chassis, it included "a pair of expansive Plexiglas bubble doors that were removable and that had a vague resemblance to the expanse of clear plastic that passed for four-weather doors on the Dune Duster. It included a rollbar that – though likely not NHRA certified and though integrated with side louvers and lights – still had a rough airfoil shape like the Dune Duster's. It included side pipes like the Dune Duster's. It included fold-up bench seats for bed seating like the Dune Duster's In addition, the Montana Lobo included foam bumpers, a winch integrated into the front bumper, a retractable loading ramp built into the tailgate, storage compartments integrated into the bed sides, a T-top roof, and a massive tinted window between the cab and the bed that slid open."

=== 1988 Bronco DM-1 ===
Built on a Ford Escort platform, the DM-1 concept was a "4-wheel drive concept vehicle was the winning design in a Ford sponsored contest for industrial art students. Mr. Derek Millsap, who created the 5-seat sport-utility vehicle, lent his initials to the Bronco DM-1 name. The bulbous body was made of steel-reinforced fiberglass, and the large hatch extended into the roof."

=== 1992 Boss Bronco ===
The Boss Bronco concept was a restyled Bronco made for a "new generation of light truck buyers", with a modern design and car-like features. It went on display at various auto shows in 1992. The Boss Bronco featured an all-new, modern front end, and a retractable fastback roof. The exterior was painted "lone star" yellow, while the interior trim had a blue/black leather finish.

=== 2001 U260 ===
In 1999, a new Bronco was secretly developed under Moray Callum, as a simple inexpensive off-roader in the spirit of the first generation Bronco, rather than the later full-size models. Planned as a 2-door and 4-door, it was codenamed U260, U meaning utility, 2 meaning 2-door, and 60 referring to the Ford Ranger's T6 platform it would have used. Land Rover underpinnings were considered but was deemed too costly. The project did not progress to a drivable state and was canceled in 2001 due to company cutbacks stemming from the Firestone and Ford tire incident. The project was publicly revealed for the first time in the leadup to the sixth gen Bronco's release, with a full-size research model displayed at the 2021 Concours d’Elegance Of America.

=== 2004 Bronco Concept ===
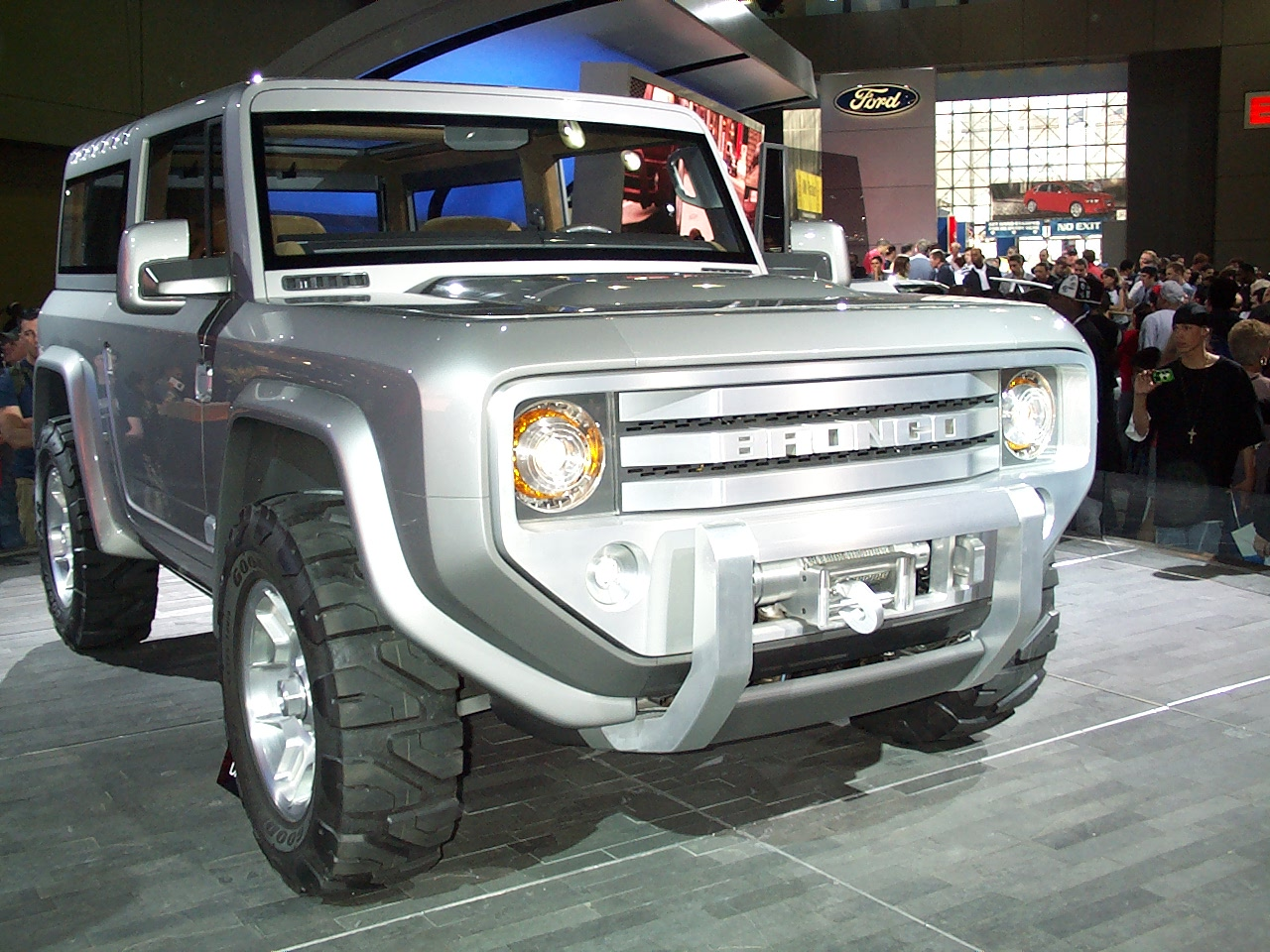
Bronco concept at the 2004 New York Auto Show

At the 2004 North American International Auto Show, a Ford Bronco concept vehicle was unveiled. Inspired by the first-generation (1966–1977) Ford Bronco, the 2004 concept adapted a short wheelbase, round headlamps, and squared-off roofline; the concept marked one of the first uses of a three-bar grille on Ford vehicles. Using a minimalist exterior design, the Bronco design was unveiled alongside a Shelby Cobra Concept at the same show.

Using the Ford CD2 platform of the Ford Escape, the Bronco concept was powered by a 2.0L four-cylinder turbodiesel (from the Ford Mondeo) and a six-speed manual transmission. Replacing ControlTrac II, an "Intelligent" 4-wheel drive system was intended for improved stability and fuel economy.

A new production Bronco was proposed in 2006, adapting the Bronco concept's design over the International Ford Ranger's chassis. It was to be exported to the US from South Africa, where it would have been built alongside the Ranger in Pretoria. It was canceled as it was seen as a risk due to rising gas prices, slowing SUV sales and weakening economy ahead of the Great Recession.

Dwayne Johnson's character drives the Bronco concept in his 2018 film, Rampage.

=== 2013 Expedition "special edition” concept ===
Ford marketer Mark Grueber spoke of a Ford Expedition show build concept that wore an intentionally nondescript rear Bronco badge, solely to prevent expiration of the Bronco trademark. It is unclear which concept he is referring to.

=== 2020 Bronco R Prototype ===
At the 2019 Baja 1000, Ford introduced the Ford Bronco R prototype with the drivetrain of the at-that-time unreleased 2021 Bronco with the intent of testing the engine, transmission and four-wheel-drive system to be used in the production-spec sixth-generation Bronco. The Baja 1000 was thought to be the perfect test for the new off-road vehicle Ford is producing, with 1,000 miles (1,609 km) of some of the world's roughest terrain. The 2020 race was also tougher after being delayed for 24 hours due to excessive rainfall in the days before the event. With the excessive rainfall, one of the Class One co-drivers Ford used in the race referred to it as the "Mud Bog 1000".While the Bronco R prototype model used for the Baja 1000 shared some components with the production Bronco, Ford upfitted the Bronco R with off-road-tuned racing suspension as well as off-road wheels and 37-inch off-road tires. The Bronco R also used a 70-U.S.-gallon (58 imp gal; 265 L) fuel tank during the race, allowing the prototype to travel up to 315 miles (507 km) of the course before refueling. While this would have been a significant advantage to the Bronco R team, the Bronco R team made stops every 130 miles (209 km) to swap drivers, as well as checking the vehicle's condition and making sure there were no repairs needed at the time.

Ford did not disclose details of the engine used in the Bronco R. The only information that is known was that the engine was a twin-turbo EcoBoost engine. When it came to the four-wheel drive system, the vehicle experienced no issues with muddy sections of the course. While the drivers only had to use four-wheel drive with low gearing to get out of thick mud, the Bronco R stopped multiple times along the course to tug other competitors out of the mud, including a near 6,000-pound (2,700 kg) trophy truck. While the Bronco R's engine, transmission and four-wheel drive held up with no issues, many of the aftermarket suspension components did not fare the same. Around mile 495 of the 1,000-mile journey, the passenger side spindle, lower-control arm and CV joint had been destroyed. The team was able to fix most issues and were able to continue the race until around mile 580, when the engine cooling fans began giving out (one fan had completely seized up, while the other was not working at max speed) causing the Bronco R to overheat and needing to be towed about 8 miles (13 km) to the next filling station. After about 30 minutes of working on the Bronco R to try to get it back on course, Ford pulled the vehicle out of the race due to severe mechanical issues.
