= Dodge Power Wagon =

- 1948 Power Wagon

Overview
- Manufacturer: Dodge (Chrysler)
- Production: 1945–1980 (original); 2005–present (Ram HD)
- Model years: 1946–1980 (original); 2005–present (Ram HD)
- Assembly: Warren, Michigan, United States

Body and chassis
- Class: Full-size pickup truck
- Layout: Front engine, four-wheel drive
- Related: Ocdresto Classic truck resto Legacy Dodge Carryall

Powertrain
- Engine: 230 cu in (3.8 L) Flathead I6; 251 cu in (4.1 L) Flathead I6; 318 cu in (5.2 L) LA V8; 360 cu in (5.9 L) LA V8

Dimensions
- Wheelbase: 126 in (3,200 mm)

Chronology
- Predecessor: Dodge WC series
- Successor: Dodge Ram

The Dodge Power Wagon is a four-wheel drive medium duty truck that was produced in various model series from 1945 to 1980 by Dodge. The Power Wagon name was revived for the 2005 model year as a four-wheel drive version of the Dodge Ram 2500. As a nameplate, "Power Wagon" continues as a special package of the four-wheel drive version of 3/4 ton Ram Trucks 2500 model.

The original civilian version, commonly called the "flat fender" Power Wagon (FFPW) or "Military Type", was mechanically based on Dodge's 3/4-ton WC series of World War II military trucks. The Power Wagon was the first 4x4 medium duty truck produced by a major manufacturer in a civilian version. It represents a significant predecessor to the many modern four-wheel drive trucks in use today. It was marketed as the WDX truck. The 230 cubic inch six cylinder engine in the first Power Wagons was known as the T137 – a name still used for the original series by enthusiasts. Following Chrysler Corporation policy of badge engineering to provide a greater number of sales outlets overseas, Power Wagons were also marketed around the world under the Fargo and De Soto badges.

Starting in the 1957 model year, factory four-wheel-drive versions of the Dodge C Series trucks were produced and sold as the W-100, W-200, W-300, and W-500, alongside the older Power Wagon. The pickups had the "Power Wagon" badge on the fender. The older design Power Wagon was marketed as the "Military Type" to distinguish it from the styled pickup versions. Later the "Military Type" was given the series number W-300M, and ultimately WM-300.

The heavy-duty four-wheel-drive W-300 and W-500 trucks were marketed as "Power Giants". The four-wheel-drive version of the Dodge Town Wagon also got the "Power Wagon" badge. The "Military Type" sales in the United States ended by 1968, because the vehicle did not comply with new federal light-duty truck regulations. The "Power Wagon" options continued on the Dodge D-Series through the 1980 model year. For the 1981 model year, "Power Ram" became the marketing name for four-wheel-drive Ram pickups, and aside from a 1999 concept vehicle, the "Power Wagon" name was not used until the 2004 revival.

== Civilian 1-ton (1945-1978) ==
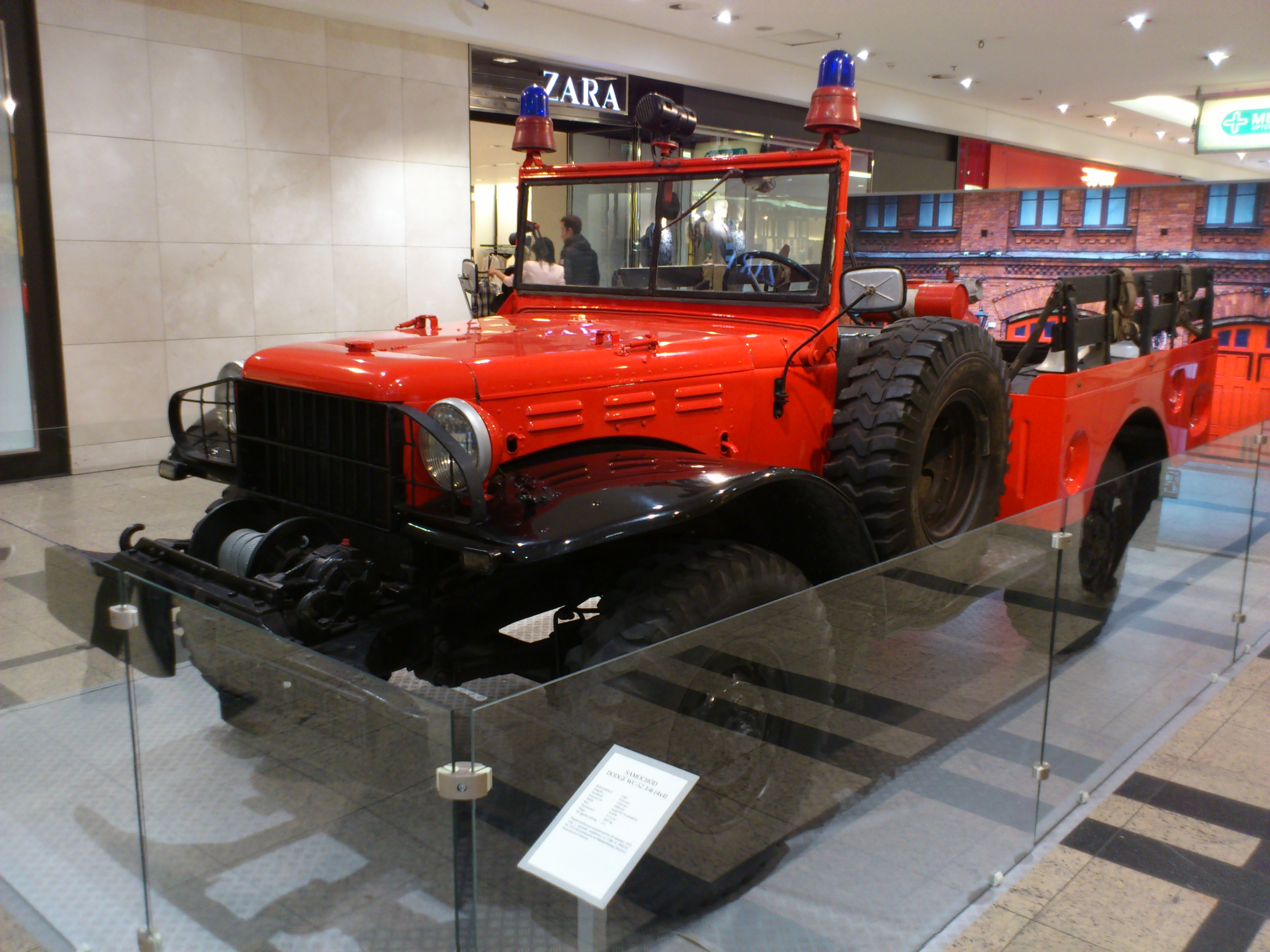
The Power Wagon was developed from the WW II Dodge WC series. Shown WC-52 became a fire truck in 1959 (Kraków, Poland)

The military style Power Wagon had three series during its lifetime, with different model numbers. The nominal one-ton rated Power Wagon's gross vehicle weight rating (GVWR) was 8,700 pounds. Its maximum payload was 3,000 pounds. It was produced starting in the 1946 model year, and U.S. sales ended in 1968. Export sales continued through 1978.

The civilian Power Wagon continued the lineage of limited production Dodge 4WD trucks from the 1930s, that proved basic four-wheel drive design concepts, primarily for the military. Mechanically derived from Dodge's 1942–1945 3/4-ton WC series military trucks, the Power Wagon was introduced in 1946 as the first civilian production 4x4 truck. During its development phase, it was initially named the WDX General Purpose Truck, a name still used on some of the preliminary materials handed out by Dodge, before sales began in March 1946. The 'W' was a continuation of the 1941–1947 model year series, followed by a 'D' instead of a 'C', because the civilian truck was a 1-ton rating instead of the Army's 3/4-ton, and the 'X' was added to indicate four-wheel drive, as opposed to all previous civilian two-wheel driven models.

Meant to compete with military-based Ford/Marmon-Herrington and GMC trucks, it had an enclosed all-weather civilian cab and a purpose-designed 8-foot cargo box. It had a 126-inch (3,200 mm) up to a 147" wheelbase chassis and featured the 230 cubic-inch flathead inline-six engine, a 4-speed manual transmission, a two-speed 1.96-1 ratio low range transfer case for part time 4-wheel drive with a power take off (PTO) which would send power front or rear for operating auxiliary equipment, and 9.00/16-8 ply tires on 16×6.50 inch 5-stud split ring steel rims. In 1961 the 230 was replaced with the 251 cubic-inch flat head six.

=== First series: late 1945-50 ===
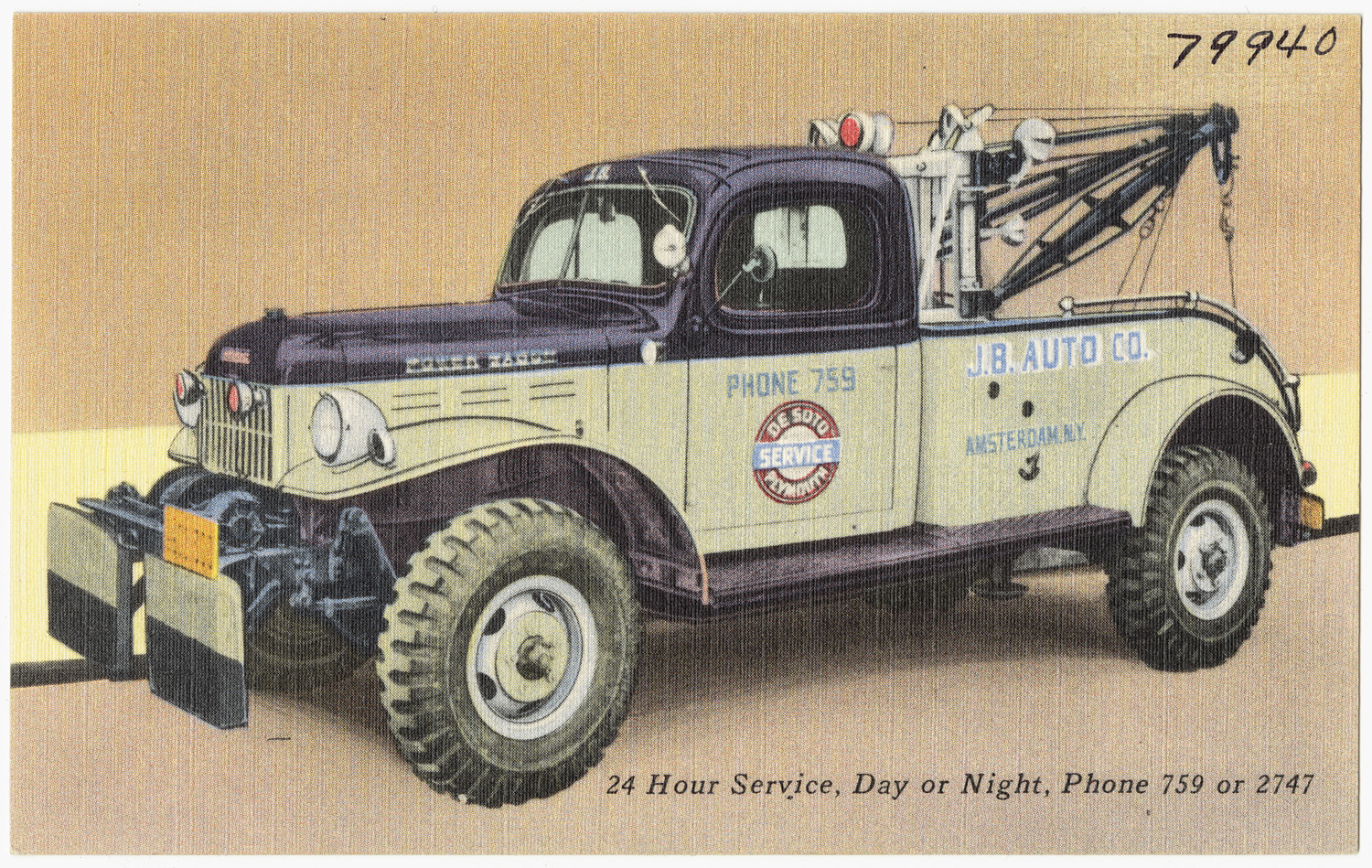
Early post-war postcard of a Power Wagon wrecker truck

Includes the following years and model numbers: 1945-47 WDX; 1948-9 B-1-PW; 1950 B-2-PW; Additional Distinguishing Features: (4) rectangular stake pockets on each side of the bed; round speedometer with a rectangular gauge cluster on each side. The two rectangular gauge housings have the instrument lettering on the glass instead of the face of the gauge.

=== Second series: 1951-56 ===
Includes the following years and model numbers: 1951 B-3-PW; 1952- early 53 B-3-PW; late 1953 B-4-PW; 1954 C-1-PW; 1955- early 56 C-3-PW; Additional Distinguishing Features: (3) slightly curved stake pockets on each side, bed sides are stamped. Looking at these bed sides from the rear, the top rail section of the bed angles out at 45 degrees with a rounded top edge. Group of 4 gauges in the center of the dash (Fuel, Amp, Temp, Oil) with silver/grey faces.

=== Third series: 1956-71 ===
Includes the following years and model numbers: Late 1956 C-4-PW; 1957 W300; 1958-9 W300M; 1960-71 WM300; Additional Distinguishing Features: (3) square stake pockets on each side with stamped bed sides. Looking at the bed sides from the rear, the top of the bed is flat, with a rounded edge. Group of 4 gauges in the center of the dash (Fuel, Amp, Temp, Oil) with black faces. NP420 Synchronized Transmission also used.

=== Third Series EXPORT: 1957-78 ===
M601 open cab, flat-faced cowl models and M615 ambulance

== Light-duty pickup trucks and Town Wagons (W100 and W200, 1957-1980) ==
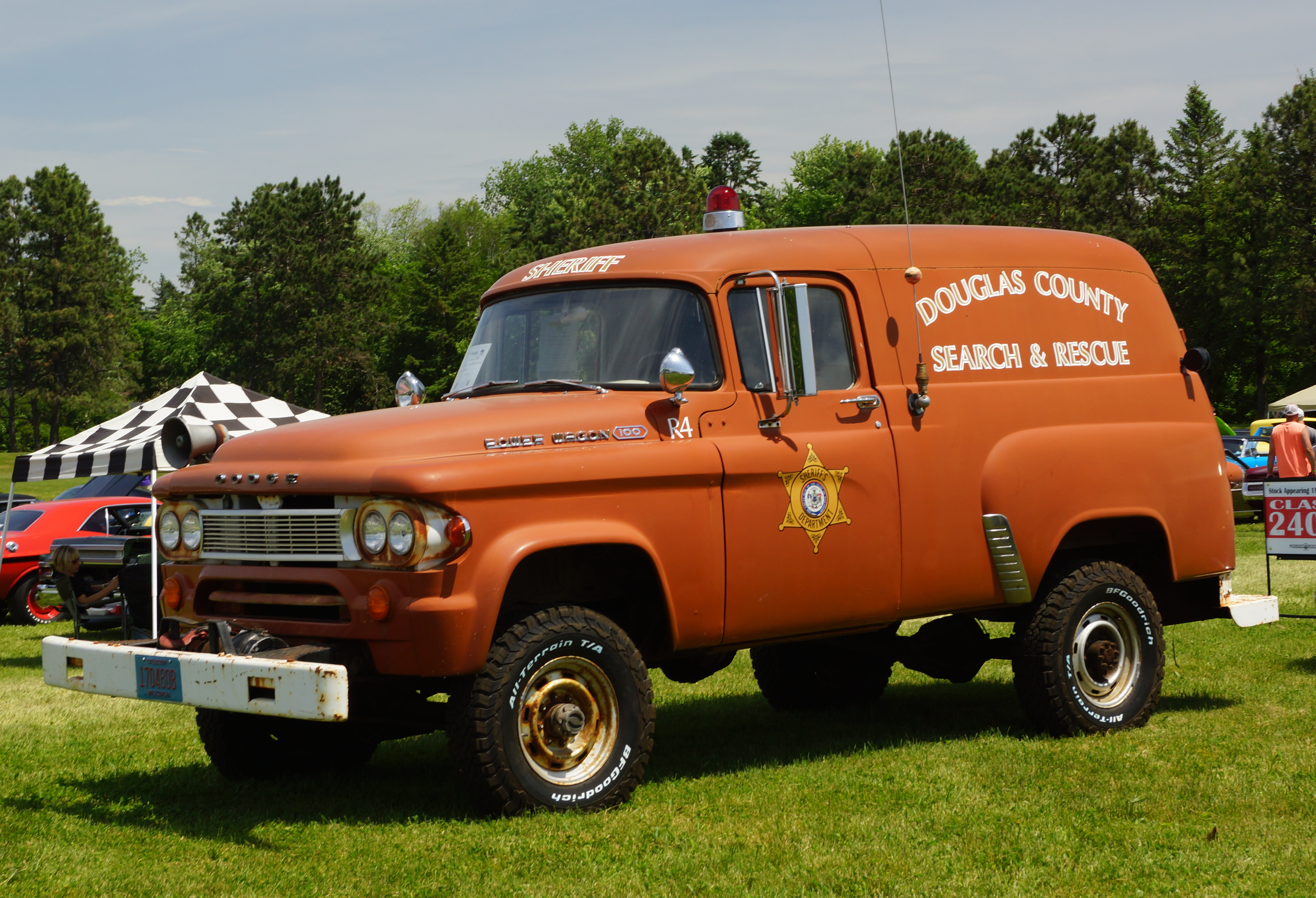
1965 Dodge Power Wagon W-100 Town Panel, Search and Rescue vehicle

The first light-duty styled Power Wagons came out in 1957 with the introduction of the four-wheel-drive versions of the Dodge C Series pickups and Town Wagons, Beginning in 1957, 1/2-ton two-and four-wheel-drive models were designated D100 and W100s, and 3/4-tons as D200 and W200, respectively. These trucks featured the same cabs, bodywork, and cargo boxes used on the conventional models. Their 4WD mechanical components—axles, transfer cases, and transmissions—were sourced from outside manufacturers. Chrysler Corporation owned the New Process Gear Company (competitors generally used Spicer (Dana) transfer cases and Borg-Warner or in-house transmissions).

In 1963, a new 225 cubic-inch Chrysler slant six replaced the 251 cubic-inch six used in 1961 & 1962 W100 & W200 Power Wagon Trucks. The Power Wagon W300 continued to use the 251 cubic-inch L-6 engine. The new 225 cubic-inch engine (the 225–2) was able to power the med. duty trucks due to improvements including roller timing chains, bi-metal connecting rod bearings, stellite-faced exhaust valves, roto caps on exhaust valves, and polyacrylic valve stem seals.

A big-block Chrysler 383 V8 engine became an option starting in 1967. From 1961 to 1971 the body was called the "Sweptline," then transitioned to a more modern body image from 1972 through 1980 with varied grilles and paint schemes. The Town Wagon Power Wagon retained the C Series body style until it was discontinued in 1966. In 1975 the 4-wheel drive became full-time with a 2-speed transfer case; this was changed back to part-time 4-wheel drive in 1980 due to the energy crisis. A huge boost in sales followed the 1974 release of the extended "Club Cab," popular with families and camper hauling. The 4-door crew cab was far less common and is quite desirable to collectors for restoration. Utility and function were unmatched by few competing models, as the towing, payload, and snow plowing capacity of the Power Wagon equipped with "Dana 60" 8-lug axles was very popular with municipal and regional road crews.

== Medium-duty trucks (W300, W500, and W600, 1957-1980) ==
A one-ton W300 light-duty/civilian type Power Wagon was released in 1958. This also had the styled cab and sheet metal as the D300 Medium duty one-ton trucks.

The two-ton W500 Power Wagon (only a chassis cab was built) was introduced in 1956 as the C3-HW and lasted through the 1971 model year. This was replaced in 1972 with the W600 (also cab and chassis only), which was produced until 1977 when all Dodge medium-duty models were discontinued. To compensate for the loss of the medium-duty W600 a new W400 chassis cab was introduced in 1977.

== Dodge Power Ram ==
The Power Wagon nameplate was discontinued in 1981 with the introduction of the Dodge Ram, with the four-wheel-drive models being sold under the "Power Ram" nameplate through 1993.

== Dodge Ram 2500 Power Wagon 2005–2009 (DH) ==
Ram 2500 Power Wagon (DH)

Overview
- Model years: 2005–2009

Body and chassis
- Body style: 2-door regular cab 4-door extended cab ("Quad Cab")

Powertrain
- Engine: 5.7 L (345 cu in) HEMI V8
- Transmission: 5-speed 545RFE automatic

Dimensions
- Wheelbase: 140.5 in (3,570 mm)
- Length: 227.7 in (5,780 mm) (Quad Cab); 229.7 in (5,830 mm) (Regular Cab)
- Width: 79.6 in (2,020 mm)

For 2005, Dodge resurrected the Power Wagon name on a version of the Dodge Ram 2500. It was an off-road version of the Ram 2500 with a 5.7 L Hemi V8 as the only engine option. Interior configurations remained similar to standard models. From 2005 to 2009, the Power Wagon offered a choice between a regular cab with an 8 ft (2.4 m) bed or a Quad Cab (extended cab) with a 6.25 ft (1.9 m) bed on a 140 in (3,556 mm) wheelbase.

Special features of the Power Wagon include:

- Electronically controlled locking differentials (front and rear)
- Electronically disconnecting front sway bar
- Integrated 12,000 lb electric Warn winch
- 17-inch diameter Alcoa forged wheels
- Large 33-inch (285/70R17) diameter BF Goodrich All Terrain T/A tires.
- Bilstein Monotube Gas Charged Shocks
- Extensive skidplates: front stabilizer bar, transfer case, fuel tank, special skid plate cross members welded to the frame with open bars bolted to them across the midsection.
- 1.4" factory lift in front, 1.0" in the rear (0.4" front and rear due to larger tires). Softer rate springs.
- Strengthened torque converter
- 4.56:1 axle ratio
- Revised clutch fan
- Strengthened steering gear
- Low range 4x4 throttle mapping changed.

Upgraded suspension and larger tires naturally give the truck a taller ride height. Clearance lights and tow hooks are standard equipment. Fender flares are standard equipment as well. The fender flares assist with tire coverage due to the Power Wagon's wider tires.

=== Powertrain ===
- 5.7 L Hemi V8 (345 hp / 375 lb-ft of torque) for 2005 - 2009 model years

==== Transmission ====
The 6-speed manual G56 transmission was standard, with the 5-speed 545RFE automatic transmission optional.

==== Transfer case ====
The transfer case was a New Venture 271 and had a 2.72:1 low range gear ratio. A transfer case skid plate was and is standard equipment. A floor-mounted manual shift-on-the-fly transfer case is the only choice available.

==== Axles ====
The axles are manufactured by American Axle & Manufacturing, Inc. The front is an AAM 9.25 and the rear is a hybrid AAM 10.5 with the larger axle shafts from the AAM 11.5. Despite the fact the axles have locking differentials, the rear axle is also a helical-type limited-slip differential when unlocked. The Power Wagon is equipped with a 4.56:1 axle gear ratio not available on other 2500 models.

== Ram 2500 Power Wagon 2010–present (DJ) ==
Ram 2500 Power Wagon (DJ)
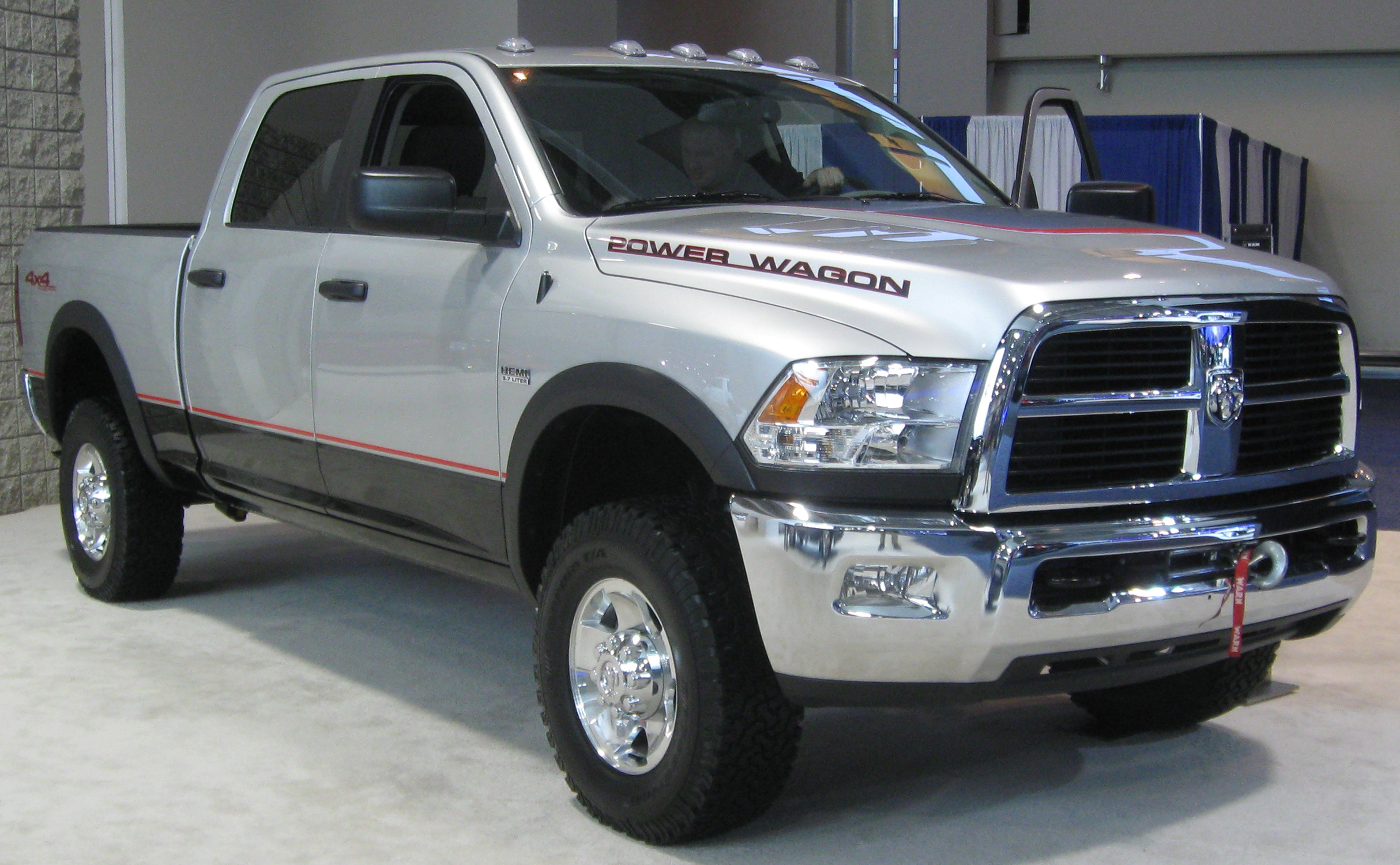
- 2011 Power Wagon (pre-facelift)

Overview
- Model years: 2010–present

Body and chassis
- Body style: 4-door crew cab

Powertrain
- Engine: Gasoline: 5.7 L (345 cu in) Hemi V8 (2010–2013); 6.4 L (392 cu in) Hemi V8 (2014–present); Diesel: 6.7 L Cummins ISB turbo I6 (2027–present)
- Transmission: 5-speed 545RFE automatic (2010–2011); 6-speed 66RFE automatic (2012–2018); 8-speed 8HP75-LCV automatic (2019–present); 8-speed ZF Torqueflite 8AP1075 Powerline automatic (2027–present)

Dimensions
- Wheelbase: 149.3 in (3,790 mm)
- Length: 237.3 in (6,030 mm) (2010-2018; 238.8 in (6,070 mm) (2019-)
- Width: 79.1 in (2,010 mm)
- Height: 81 in (2,100 mm)

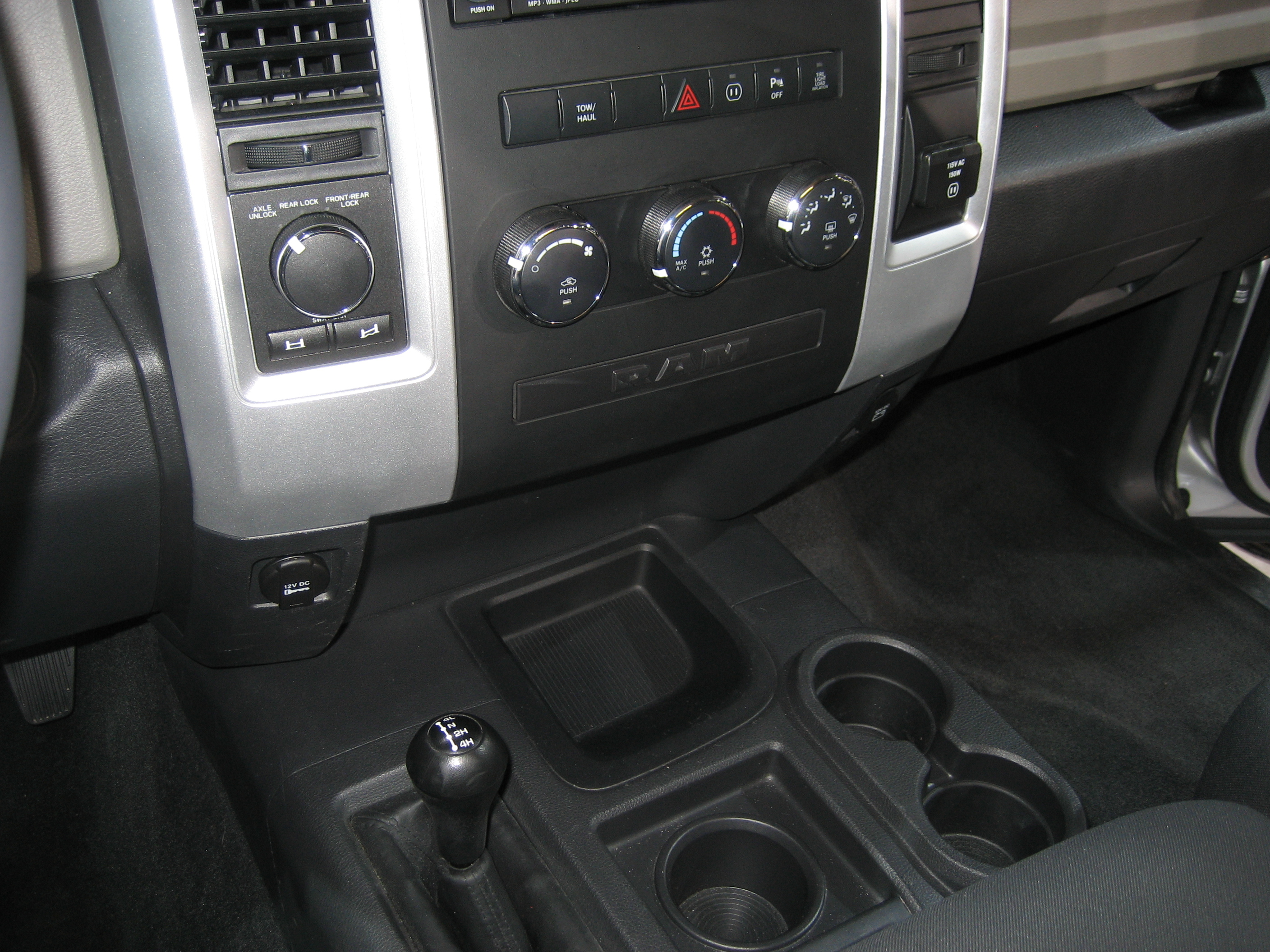
Locker selection control/sway bar disconnect control

In 2010, Dodge trucks were re-branded as Ram, and the Heavy Duty lineup received a major redesign. The Power Wagon model continued, now only available as a crew cab with a 6.33 ft (1.9 m) bed on a 149 in (3,785 mm) wheelbase. Unlike other Ram HD trucks, it was only available with a Hemi engine with no Cummins diesel option, as the tow winch uses the space needed for the Cummins' intercooler. The Cummins engine also impacted its off-road capabilities, being significantly heavier than the Hemi engine. The Power Wagon features off-road-tuned suspension, electronically locking differentials, electronic sway bar disconnects, and a 12,000 lb winch. Due to the softer suspension, the Power Wagon models have a reduced GVWR, and consequentially a lower payload and towing capacity, compared to a standard 2500.

=== Powertrain ===
==== Engines ====
Model years	Engine	Power	Torque
2010–2013	5.7 L Hemi V8	383 hp (286 kW) at 5,600 rpm	400 lb⋅ft (542 N⋅m) at 4,000 rpm
2014–	6.4 L Hemi V8	2014–2024: 410 hp (306 kW) at 5,600 rpm 2025–present: 405 hp (302 kW) at 5,600 rpm	429 lb⋅ft (582 N⋅m) at 4,000 rpm
2027–	6.7 L Cummins ISB high output I6	430 hp (321 kW) at 2,800 rpm	1,075 lb⋅ft (1,458 N⋅m) at 1,800 rpm

==== Transmission ====
Beginning in 2010, the Power Wagon is only available with automatic transmissions.

Model year	Transmission
2010–2011	5-speed 545RFE automatic
2012–2018	6-speed 66RFE automatic
2019–present	8-speed ZF 8HP75-LCV automatic
2027–present	8-speed ZF Torqueflite 8AP1075 Powerline automatic

==== Transfer case ====
A floor-mounted, manual-shift transfer case was the only option on the Power Wagon, until the 2021 model year when the electronic-shift transfer case was made available as an option. For 2025, electronic-shift is standard and manual-shift is no longer available.

For 2019, the front driveshaft switched to a CV joint connection at the transfer case.

Transfer case	Low range ratio	Model year	Notes
New Venture 271	2.72:1	2010–2012	Floor-mounted manual shift-on-the-fly, up to January 2012
Borg-Warner 44-47	2.64:1	2012–2024	Floor-mounted manual shift-on-the-fly, January 2012 and later
Borg-Warner 44-46	2.64:1	2021–present	Electronic shift-on-the-fly, optional 2021–2024, standard from 2025 on

==== Axles ====
Power Wagon models use AAM's "TracRite" locking differentials. The EL model for the front and GTL model in the rear, the differentials are electronically lockable on-demand using controls located on the dashboard, and the rear is limited-slip under normal conditions.

2010 Power Wagon models (along with other Ram trucks) received larger universal joints but retained the AAM 9.25 front and AAM 10.5 rear axle with a 4.56:1 final drive.

For the 2014 model year, with the introduction of the more powerful 6.4 L engine, the axle ratio was reduced to 4.10:1. The larger AAM 11.5 rear axle is also introduced for the 2014 model year.

In the 2019 model year changes, the Power Wagon retained the AAM 9.25 front axle, AAM 11.5 rear axle, and 4.10:1 gear ratio; however rear axle internals were changed including different axle shafts, differential carrier, and larger 32-spline pinion.

=== 2014 update ===
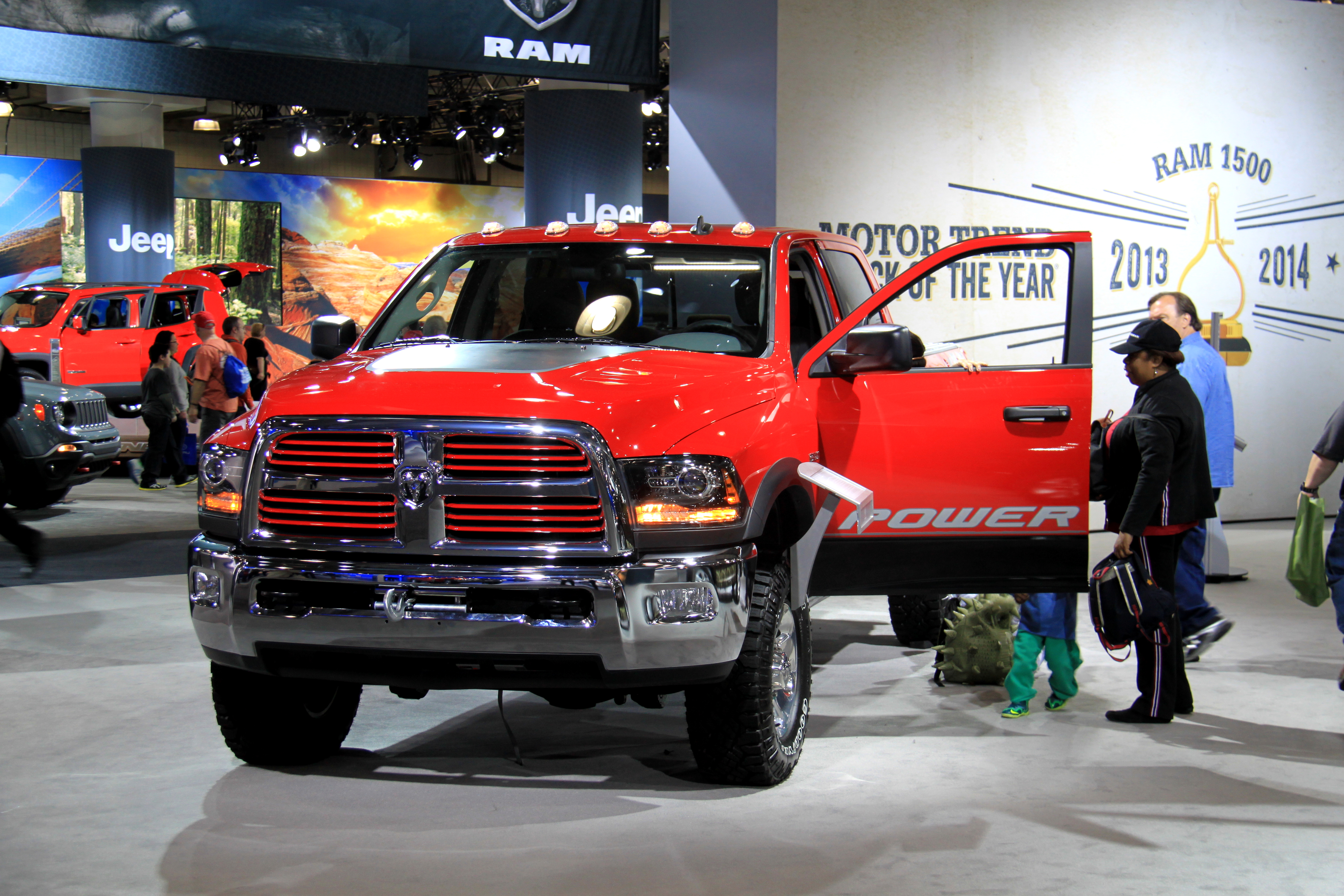
2015 Ram 2500 Power Wagon (first facelift) at the New York International Auto Show

The 2014 Ram Power Wagon underwent extensive changes. Starting with 2014 models, the Power Wagon comes standard with the new, larger 6.4L Hemi V8. The transmission and transfer case remain unchanged, but the axle ratio changes from 4.56:1 gear ratio to 4:10 gear ratios. The rear axle is exchanged for the larger 11.5 AAM axle.

2018 Ram 2500 Power Wagon (second facelift)

For 2014, the entire Ram 2500 lineup rear suspension is changed from traditional leaf springs to 5-link coil spring arrangement, and the front suspension has been changed to a radius arm arrangement (3-link) instead of the 5-link previously used. The Power Wagon is equipped with approximately 2" lift over the standard Ram 2500 and is equipped with softer rate springs for off-road performance. Unique to the Power Wagon 3-link front suspension is the "Articulink" front radius arms, which add an extra link and rubber bushing, enabling additional axle articulation. The Power Wagon continues to use Bilstein 4600 shocks. The Power Wagon is equipped with a 5th Bilstein damper, connected to the rear axle to dampen "power hop", a symptom of the 5-link rear suspension during wheel spin.

Factory-equipped tires are changed to Goodyear Wrangler Duratrac but remain 33" (285/70R17).

The 2014 Power Wagon is available in 3 trim levels: Tradesman, SLT, and Laramie. The Power Wagon Laramie trim was discontinued in 2018.

=== 2019 update ===
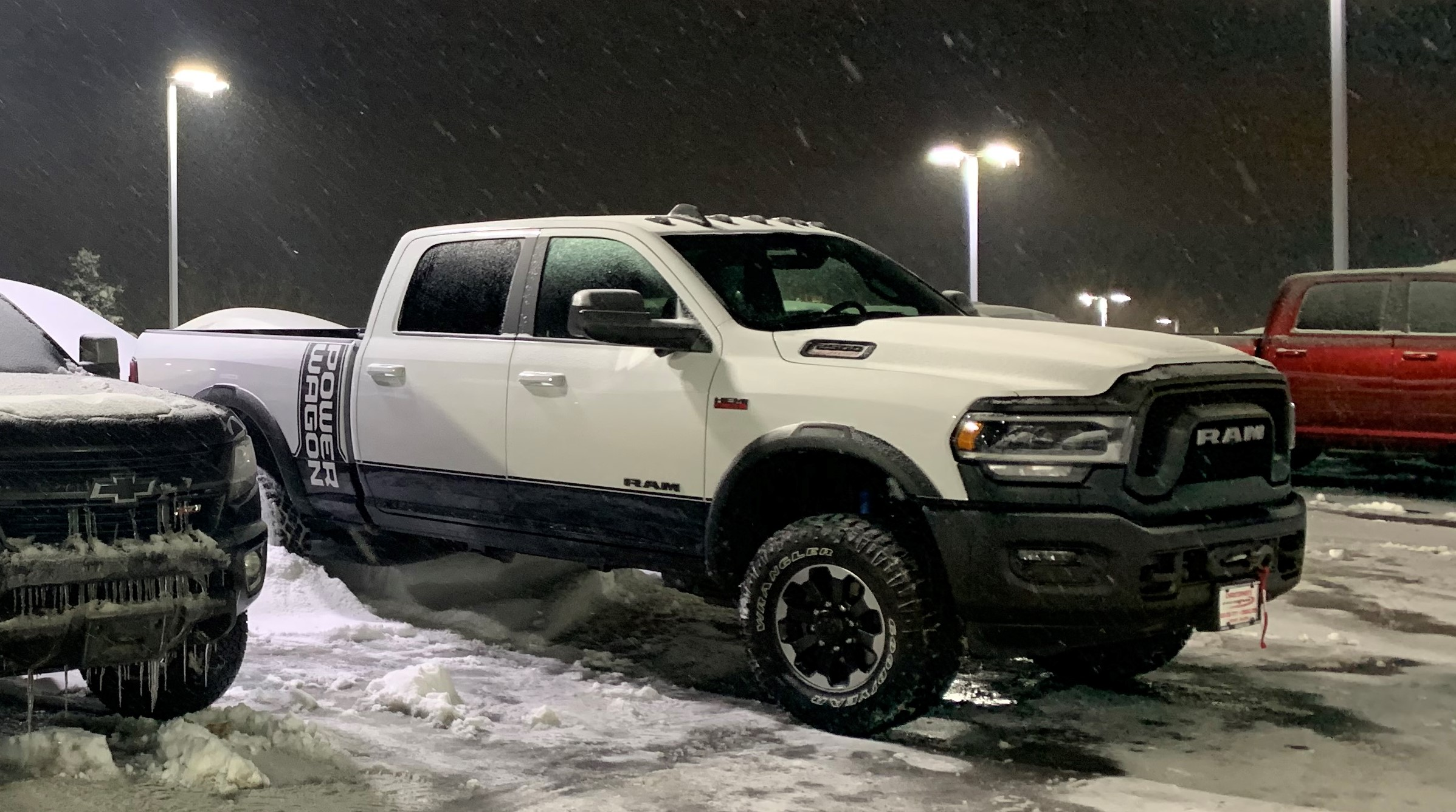
2019 Ram 2500 Power Wagon

For the 2019 model year, Ram provided a major overhaul of the Heavy Duty lineup. This included a new, fully boxed frame, entirely new front end, and interior updated similar to the DT Ram 1500. However, mechanically the Power Wagon stayed mostly unchanged from the 2018 model year. Notably, it received the ZF 8-speed transmission, over the outgoing Chrysler built 66RFE 6-speed unit. The Power Wagon becomes its own trim level, while "Power Wagon Package" is still available for "Tradesman" trim 2500's, adding the same suspension, axles, wheels/tires, skid plates, and winch as the "Power Wagon" trim version, but in an otherwise more spartan package. For the 2019 model, the winch is updated with a Warn Zeon 12 based unit, with synthetic rope.

==== 75th Anniversary Edition ====
For the 2021 model year, the Power Wagon is offered with a special "75th Anniversary Edition Package", celebrating the Power Wagon name-plate heritage going back to 1946. The 75AE featured a special "jail bar" vertical bar grille, special badging including an individually numbered plate on dashboard, electronic-shift transfer case, new 17x8.0 beadlock-capable wheels, rock slider steps, special "Mountain Brown" leather bucket seats with center console, and LED projector headlamps borrowed from the top-trim "Limited" models. The 75AE was the first Power Wagon ever available with an electronic shift transfer case, though the option quickly became available on regular Power Wagons. The beadlock capable wheels and rock-slider steps were also later added as available options to regular Power Wagon models.

==== 2025 update ====
All Ram HD trucks, including the Power Wagon, received a facelift for model year 2025. Changes include new headlamps and grilles, tail lamps, and the interior. For 2025 the manual-shift transfer case is discontinued.

2026 Ram 2500 Power Wagon

=== 2026 update ===
On January 1, 2026, the 2027 Ram 2500 Power Wagon was revealed, and it now features the highly requested 6.7 L Cummins diesel engine. However, adding the diesel engine required the removal of the tow winch on the front of the truck due to the engine's intercooler, and also some compromised off-road capabilities. On the same day, the 2027 Ram 1500 SRT TRX was also unveiled.

=== Graphics packages & styling ===
The 2010–2013 Power Wagons were available with a red and black graphics package, with large "Power Wagon" lettering on the tailgate and hood.

The 2014–2016 Power Wagons in SLT trim received a special red grille, and colorful "splash" graphics down the side of the truck with "Power Wagon" spelled out in large lettering on the doors. A large "Power Wagon" decal is also added to the tailgate and blackout hood decal. Blackout projector headlamps are standard. The Laramie Power Wagon receives only a chrome "Power Wagon" emblem on the tailgate.

The years 2017–2018 saw a slightly more subtle graphics package that pays homage to the late 1970s Dodge Macho Power Wagon, with black lower two-tone paint tying into a vertical black stripe on the bedsides with "Power Wagon" spelled out. It received a slight change to the "Power Wagon" decal on the tailgate and a black-out decal on the top of the hood.

Starting in 2017, Power Wagons got a unique matte-black "handlebar mustache" grille, and black powder-coat front and rear bumpers, blackout emblems, as well as new black eight-spoke wheels. Laramie and Tradesman trim Power Wagons retained chrome bumpers and regular grilles.

The 2019 graphics package was largely the same as 2018, but with a slight change in font. A "handlebar mustache" grille is retained but redesigned for the new front end. Blackout LED headlamps are standard as well as blackout emblems.

In 2021, the 75AE received special "outline" Power Wagon decals on the front doors and tailgates and did not have the standard hood decal or vertical bed-side decal. It received a new "jail bar" vertical-bar grille, and special "75 Years of Service" emblems on the C pillars. The "jail bar" grille and outline graphics package became optional on 2022 model year trucks.

== Gallery ==
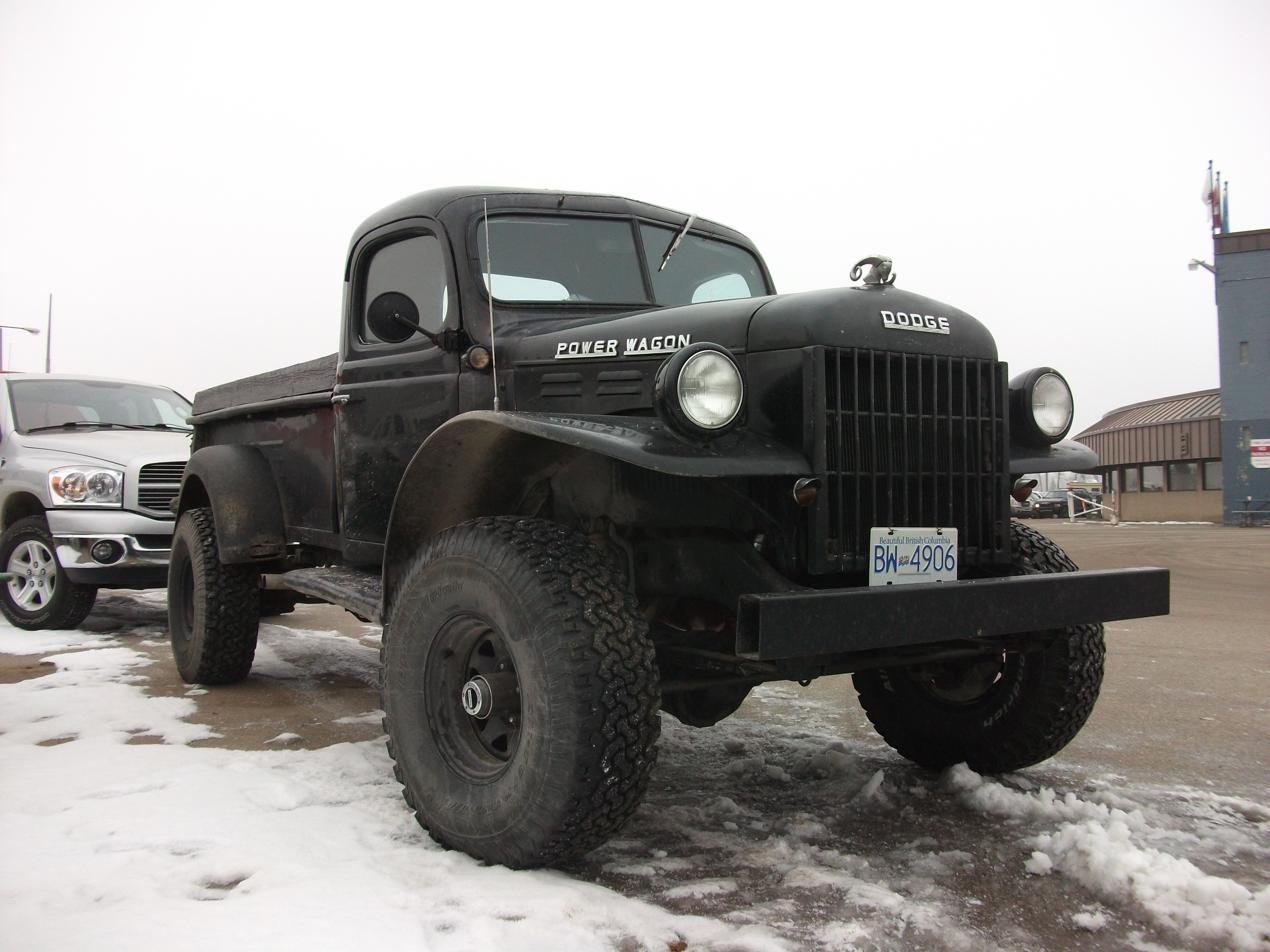
Power Wagon WM-300. This model was sold into the mid-1960s

1954 Power Wagon

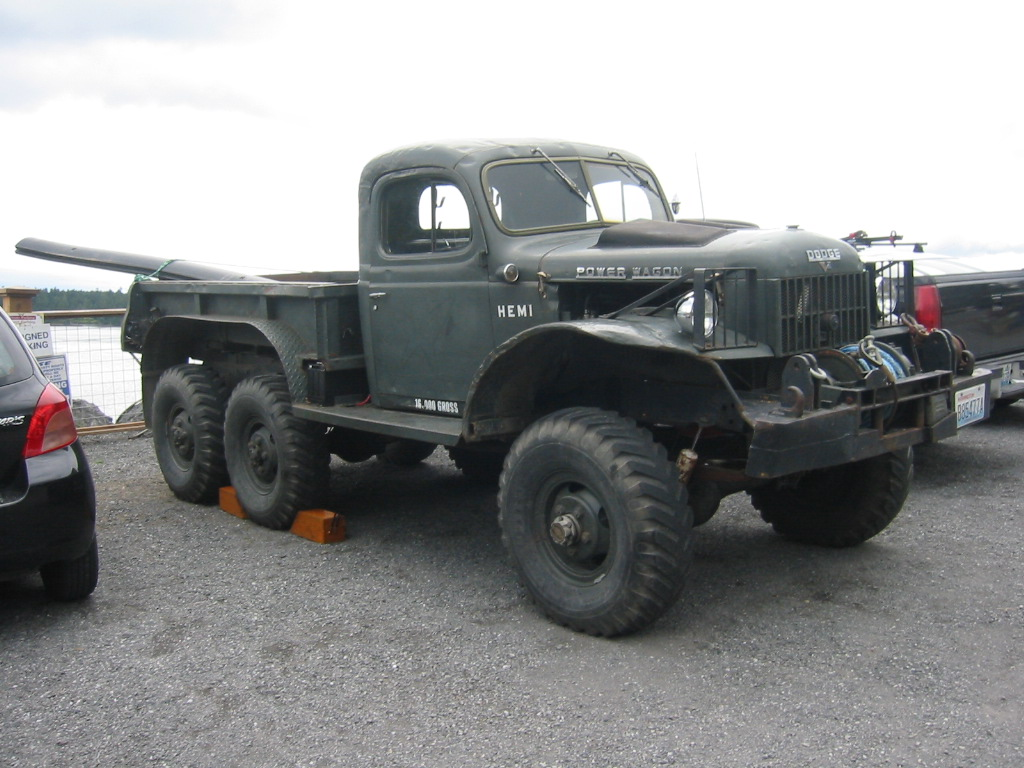
Power Wagon with a custom conversion to 6 wheel drive

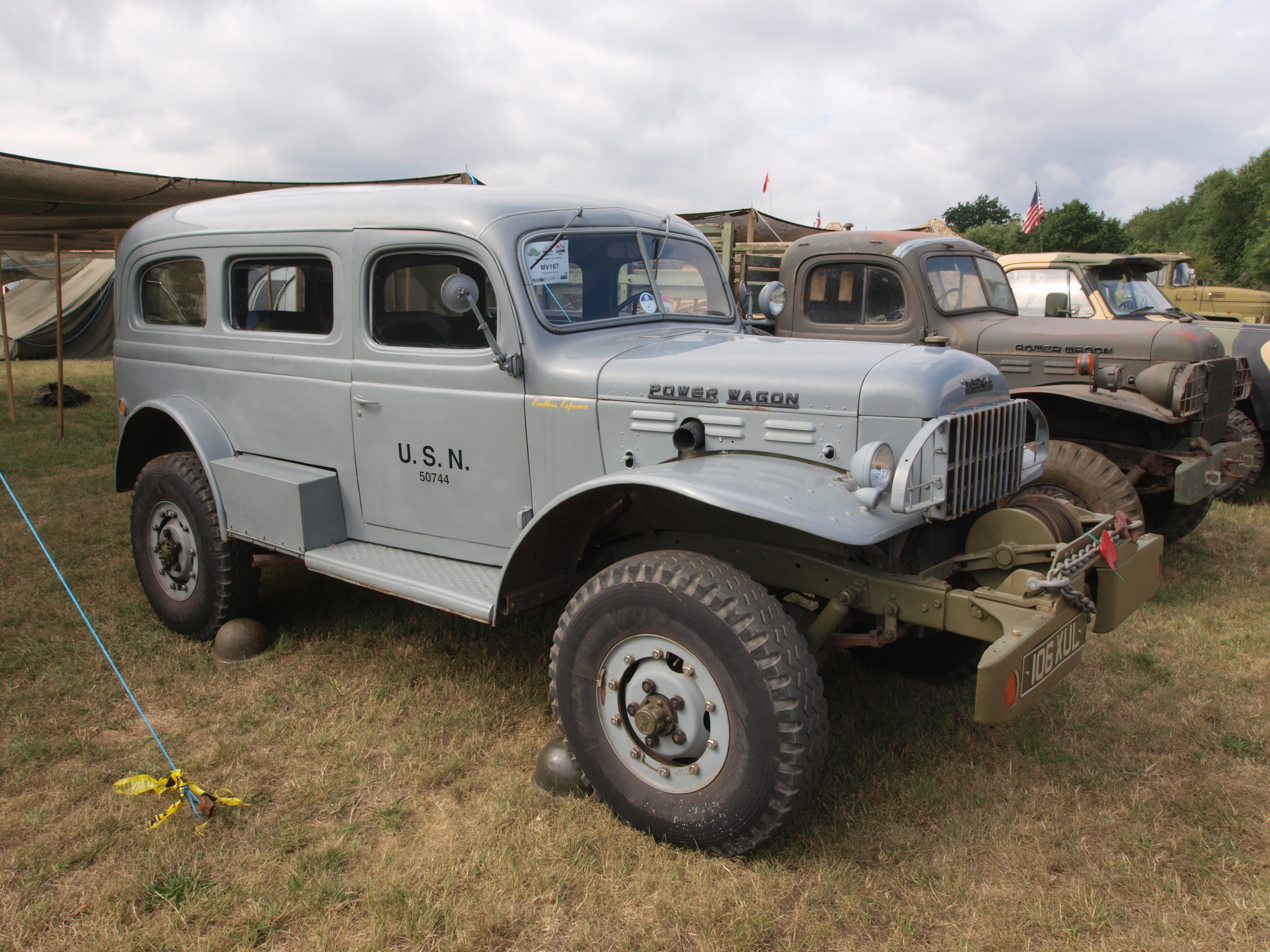
1958 WM-300 carryall in US Navy livery

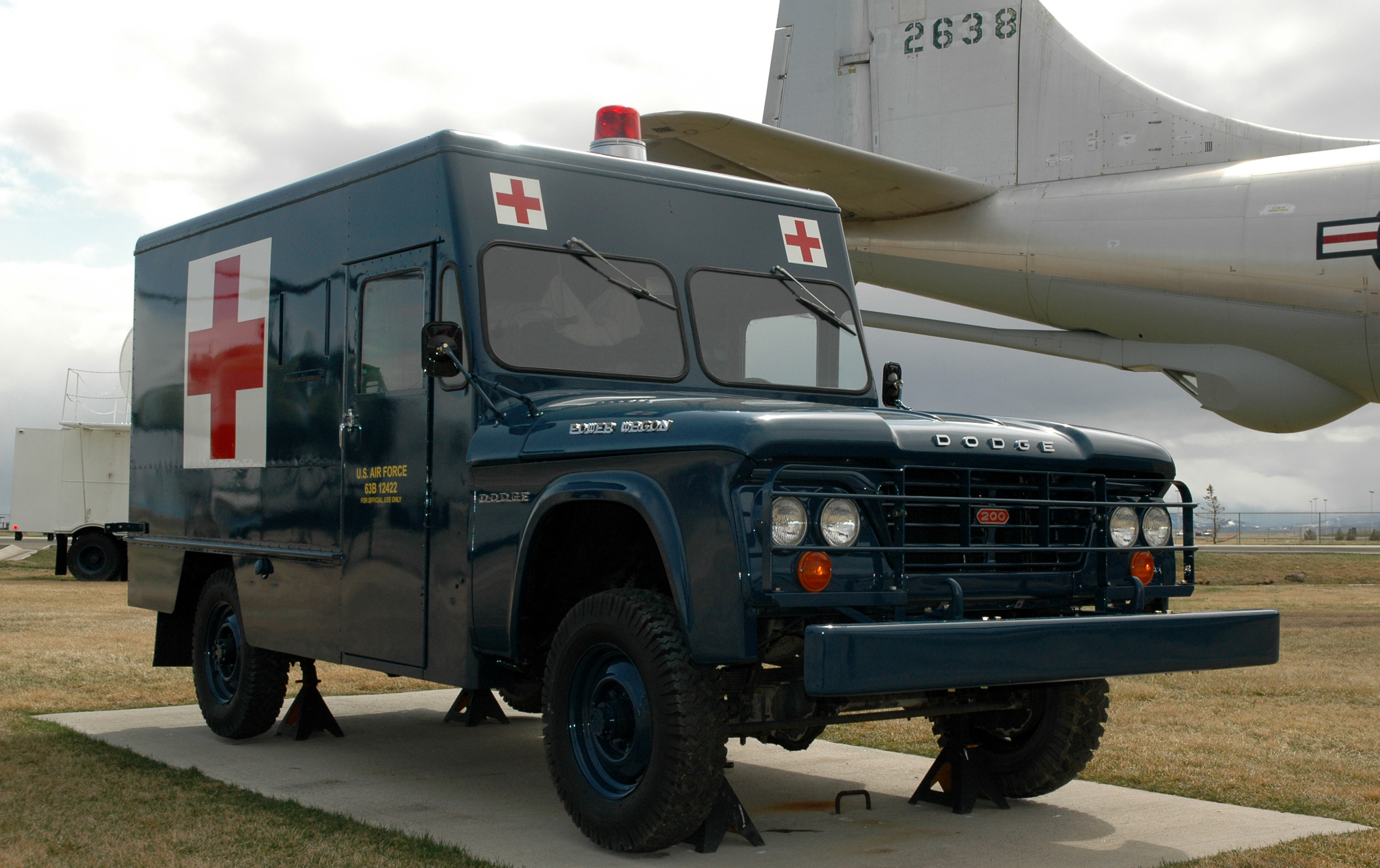
1963 Dodge W200 Power Wagon ambulance, on display at Malmstrom Air Force Base, Montana

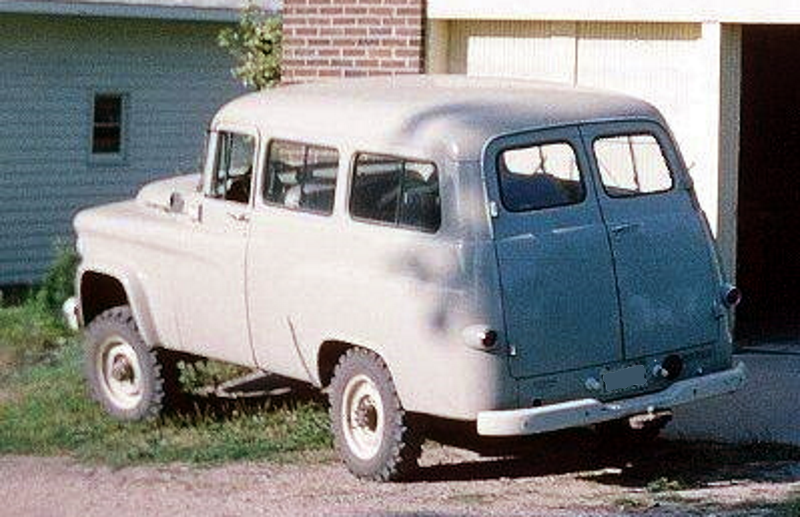
1965 Dodge Town Wagon Power Wagon W100

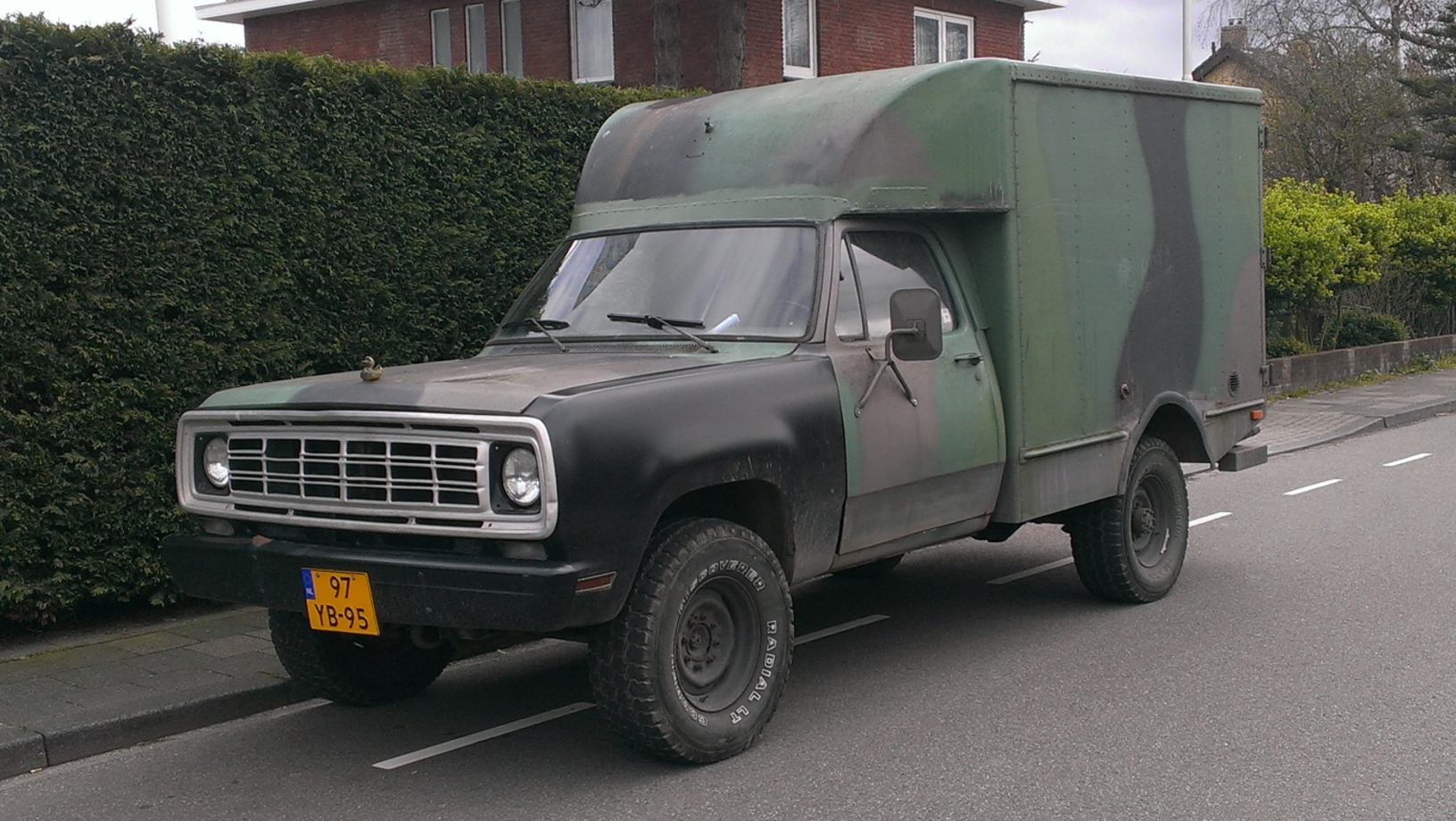
1976 Dodge W200 CUCV

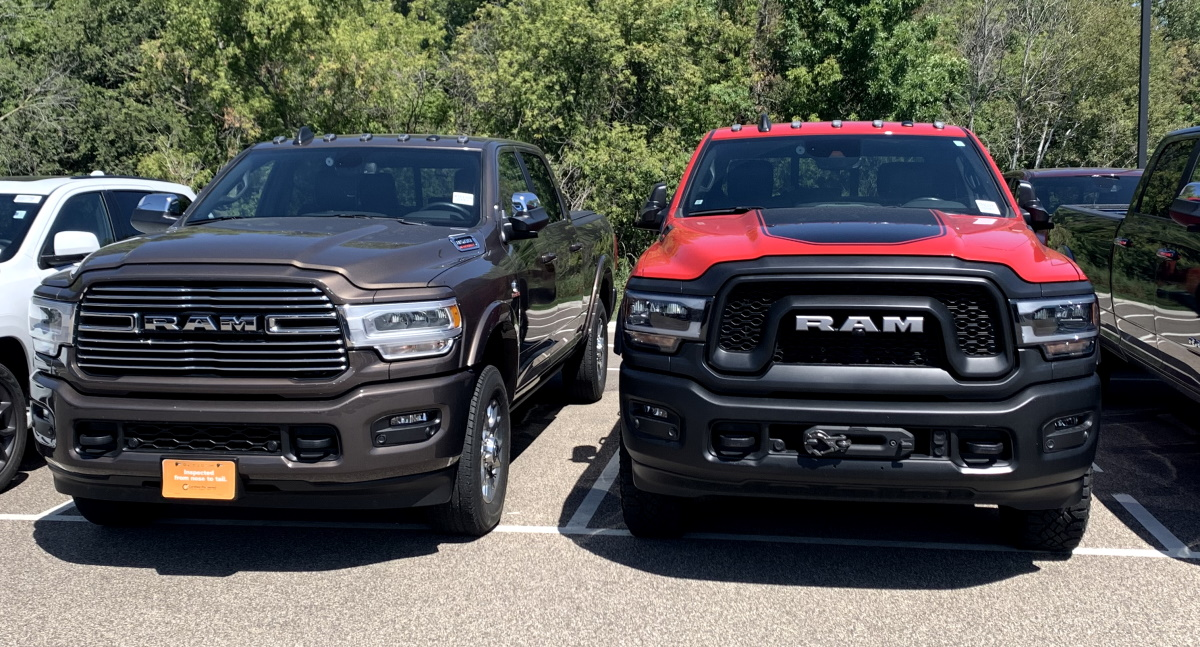
Ram 3500 next to a Ram 2500 Power Wagon, showing the distinctive grill and winch for the Power Wagon

== See also ==
- Dodge WC series
- Dodge W-series/Power Ram
- Dodge Town Panel and Town Wagon
- List of Dodge automobiles
- Commercial Utility Cargo Vehicle
