= Vehicle weight =

Measurement of wheeled motor vehicles

Vehicle weight is a measurement of wheeled motor vehicles; either an actual measured weight of the vehicle under defined conditions or a gross weight rating for its weight carrying capacity.

== Curb or kerb weight ==
Curb weight (American English) or kerb weight (British English) is the total mass of a vehicle with standard equipment and all necessary operating consumables such as motor oil, transmission oil, brake fluid, coolant, air conditioning refrigerant, and sometimes a full tank of fuel, while not loaded with either passengers or cargo. The gross vehicle weight is larger and includes the maximum payload of passengers and cargo.

This definition differs from definitions used by governmental regulatory agencies or other organizations. European Union manufacturers include the weight of a 75-kilogram (165 lb) driver and luggage to follow EU Directive 95/48/EC. Organizations may also define curb weight with fixed levels of fuel and other variables to equalize the value for the comparison of different vehicles.

The United States Environmental Protection Agency regulations define curb weight as the actual or the manufacturer's estimated weight of the vehicle in operational status with all standard equipment, and weight of fuel at nominal tank capacity, and the weight of optional equipment computed in accordance with §86.1832–01; incomplete light-duty trucks have the curb weight specified by the manufacturer.

For a motorcycle, wet weight is the equivalent term.

== Dry weight ==
Dry weight is the weight of a vehicle without any consumables, passengers, or cargo. It is significantly less than the weight of a vehicle in a drivable condition and therefore rarely used. Quoting a dry weight can make a car's weight and power-to-weight figures appear far more favorable than those of rival cars using curb weight.

The difference between dry weight and curb weight depends on many variables such as the capacity of the fuel tank. There is no standard for dry weight, so it's open to interpretations.

Some vehicle manufacturers have used the term shipping weight, which refers to the vehicle in as-built, no-option condition. This would include engine oil, coolant, brake fluid and at least some small quantity of fuel, as vehicles have traditionally been driven off the assembly line and these fluids were necessary to do so.

=== Motorcycles ===
The dry weight of a motorcycle excludes some or all of the following: gasoline (or other fuel), engine oil, coolant, brake fluid, or battery.

There is no standardized way to test the dry weight of a motorcycle. Inconsistencies will almost always be found between a motorcycle manufacturer's published dry weight and motorcycle press and media outlet's published dry weight. This is due to different testing techniques, differences in what is being excluded, and a lack of defining how testing was conducted by the organization doing the testing.

== Gross weight ratings ==
=== Gross vehicle weight rating ===
The gross vehicle weight rating (GVWR), or gross vehicle mass (GVM), is the maximum operating weight/mass of a vehicle as specified by the manufacturer including the vehicle's chassis, body, engine, engine fluids, fuel, accessories, driver, passengers and cargo but excluding that of any trailers.

The weight of a vehicle is influenced by passengers, cargo, even fuel level, so a number of terms are used to express the weight of a vehicle in a designated state. Gross combined weight rating (GCWR) refers to the total mass of a vehicle including all trailers. GVWR and GCWR are used to specify weight limitations and restrictions. Gross trailer weight rating specifies the maximum weight of a trailer and the gross axle weight rating specifies the maximum weight on any particular axle.

==== Australia ====
A car driver licence is limited to driving vehicles up to a maximum GVM of 4,500 kg (9,921 lb). Beyond this, a different class of licence is required. A vehicle with a GVM up to 4,500 kg is termed a light vehicle, while those over 4,500 kg are termed heavy vehicles.

Many models of small trucks are manufactured to have a GVM rating of 5,000 to 7,000 kg (11,023 to 15,432 lb) but sold with the option of a GVM of just under 4,500 kg so that they can be driven on a car licence.

Many minor roads, including some in rural areas and some in suburban areas, have GVM restrictions such as 5,000 kg or 8,000 kg. These restrictions may be applied for technical reasons such as load limited bridges, or as a method of reducing the number of heavy vehicles on local roads.

==== United Kingdom ====
A standard car driving licence issued by an EU country (i.e. class B) limits the licence-holder to driving vehicles with a "maximum authorised mass" (i.e. GVWR) of 3,500 kg (7,700 lb). This includes holders of UK class B driving licences who passed their driving tests on or after 1 January 1997. The gross vehicle weight is also referred to as the revenue weight.

A UK driving licence holder who passed their class B driving test in or before 1996 is limited to driving vehicles with a GVWR of 7,500 kg (16,500 lb) or less, including minibuses not used for hire or reward.

Anyone looking to drive a heavy goods vehicle (i.e. any vehicle other than those used for passenger transport) with a GVWR of over 7,500 kg (16,500 lb) must obtain a class C licence. Anyone looking to drive any vehicle with a GVWR of up to 3,500–7,500 kg (7,700–16,500 lb) must obtain a class C1 licence. Anyone with a class C licence can drive class C1 vehicles.

==== United States ====
In the United States, three important GVWR limitations are 6,000, 8,500, and 26,000 pounds [lb] (2,722, 3,856, and 11,793 kg). Vehicles over 6,000 lb are restricted from some city roadways, although it is not always clear if this restriction is for actual curb weight or GVWR. Commercial vehicles over the 8,500 lb threshold are required to have insurance under the Motor Carrier Act of 1980 and 49 CFR 387.303.

Vehicles or combinations with a GVWR over 26,000 lb (11,793 kg) generally require a Commercial Driver License (CDL) or a Non-Commercial Class "A" or "B" license. A CDL is also required for certain vehicles under 26,000 lb GVWR, such as buses and for-hire passenger vehicles of 16 or more passengers, all vehicles transporting placarded hazardous materials or wastes regardless of weight or load class, and any vehicle towing a trailer with a Gross Trailer Weight over 10,000 lb (4,536 kg) where the combined weight ratings of the vehicle and trailer are greater than 26,000 lbs.

Weigh-station requirements in the United States vary by state. Some states require all commercial motor vehicles to stop, while others require only vehicles above a specified weight. There is no single nationwide 10,000-pound threshold. Vehicle-registration fee formulas also vary by jurisdiction. For example, California assesses certain commercial-vehicle weight fees based on declared gross vehicle weight (GVW) or combined gross vehicle weight (CGW). New Hampshire’s state registration fee schedule, by contrast, uses gross-weight categories and charges a fee per 100 pounds for vehicles in specified weight ranges.

==== Labeling ====
On vehicles designed for the North American market, the GVWR can be found alongside other vehicle technical specifications on the Vehicle ID Plate that is usually located on the interior of the B-pillar according to U.S. or Canadian Federal Motor Vehicle Safety Standards (inside the driver's door, near the door latch).

Most U.S. and Australian commercial trucks are required by licensing authorities to have this information printed on the outside of the vehicle, and for it to be clearly visible from a specified distance.

=== Gross trailer weight rating ===
The gross trailer weight rating (GTWR) is the total mass of a road trailer that is loaded to capacity, including the weight of the trailer itself, plus fluids and cargo, that a vehicle is rated to tow by the manufacturer. In the United States and Canada, the static tongue load, the weight of the trailer as measured at the trailer coupling, is generally recommended to be 10–15% of the GTWR.

In the United States and Canada, there are four main weight classes of trailer hitches as defined by the Society of Automotive Engineers (SAE):

- Class I – rated to 2,000 pounds (907 kg)
- Class II – rated to 3,500 pounds (1,588 kg)
- Class III – rated to 5,000 pounds (2,268 kg)
- Class IV – rated to 10,000 pounds (4,536 kg)

=== Gross combined weight rating ===
The gross combined weight rating or gross combination weight rating (GCWR), also referred to as the gross combination mass (GCM), gross train weight (GTW), is the maximum allowable combined mass of a road vehicle, the passengers and cargo in the tow vehicle, plus the mass of the trailer and cargo in the trailer. This rating is set by the vehicle manufacturer.

The GCWR is a function of the torque output of the engine, the capacity and ratios of the transmission, the capacity of the driving axles and tires, the capacity of the radiator, and the ability of the chassis to withstand that torque.

=== Gross axle weight rating ===
The gross axle weight rating (GAWR) is the maximum distributed weight that may be supported by an axle of a road vehicle. Typically, GAWR is followed by either the letters FR or RR, which indicate front or rear axles respectively.

==== Importance ====
Road damage rises steeply with axle weight, and is estimated "as a rule of thumb... for reasonably strong pavement surfaces" to be proportional to the fourth power of the axle weight. This means that doubling the axle weight will increase road damage (2×2×2×2)=16 times. For this reason, trucks with a high axle weight are heavily taxed in most countries.

Examples of GAWR on common axles:

Axle	GAWR (max.)	Manufacturer
Dana 30	2,770 lb or 1,260 kg	Dana Holding Corporation
Dana 35	2,770 lb or 1,260 kg	Dana Holding Corporation
Dana 44	3,500 lb or 1,600 kg	Dana Holding Corporation
Dana 50	5,000 lb or 2,300 kg	Dana Holding Corporation
Dana 60	6,500 lb or 2,900 kg	Dana Holding Corporation
Dana S 60	7,000 lb or 3,200 kg	Dana Holding Corporation
Dana 70	10,000 lb or 4,500 kg	Dana Holding Corporation
Dana 80	12,000 lb or 5,400 kg	Dana Holding Corporation
Dana S 110	14,700 lb or 6,700 kg	Dana Holding Corporation
Dana S 130	16,000 lb or 7,300 kg	Dana Holding Corporation
Ford 9-inch axle	3,600 lb or 1,600 kg	Ford Motor Company
Ford 8.8 axle	3,800 lb or 1,700 kg	Visteon
Sterling 10.5 axle	9,750 lb or 4,420 kg	Visteon
10.5" Corporate 14 Bolt Differential	8,600 lb or 3,900 kg	American Axle
11.5 AAM	10,000 lb or 4,500 kg	American Axle
10.5 AAM	9,000 lb or 4,100 kg	American Axle
Saginaw 9.5-inch axle	6,000 lb or 2,700 kg	American Axle

==== Maximum weight laws ====
In the EU and U.S. legal maximum load restrictions are placed on weight, independent of the manufacturer's rating. In the EU a tractor can generally have 10 tonnes (22,000 lb) on a single axle, with suspension type and number of tires often allowing slightly higher loads. In the U.S. weight restrictions are generally 20,000 pounds (9,100 kg) on a single axle, and 34,000 pounds (15,000 kg) (less than two single axles) on a tandem. The primary factor is distance between axle centerlines, also used to measure bridge formulas. A bridge formula does not reduce axle load allowance, rather gross vehicle weight (GVW), which can affect load distribution and actual axle weights.

== See also ==
- Vehicular metrics
- Vehicle size class
- Truck scale
- On-board scale
