= Center axle disconnect =

Type of automotive drivetrain

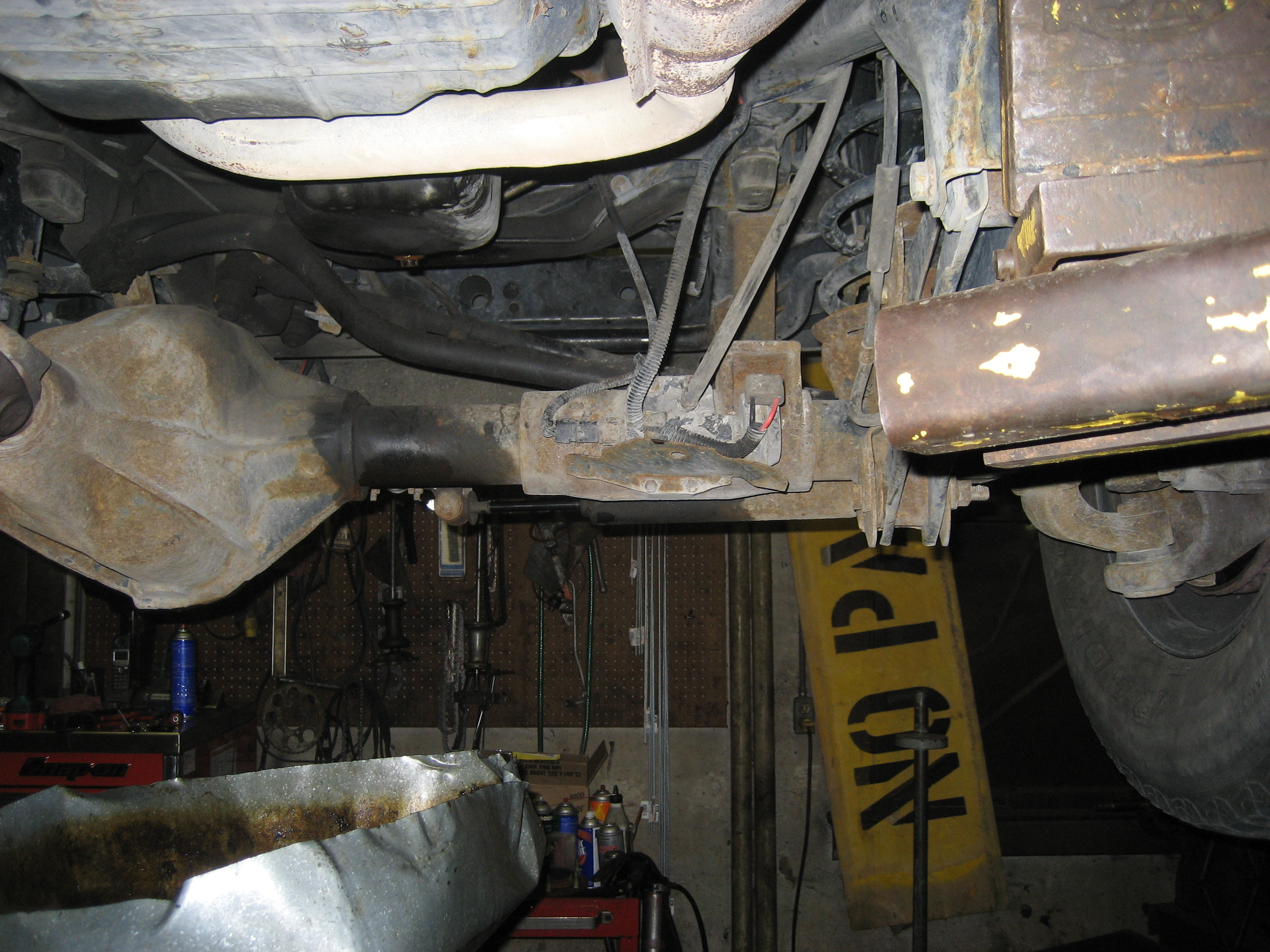
Center axle disconnect on a Dana 60, in a 1999 4x4 Dodge 2500HD

A center axle disconnect system or CAD is an alternative to locking hubs. CAD systems are typically used in front drive axles on four wheel drive vehicles. A CAD system works by having an axle shaft (typically the longer shaft) split into two pieces. One piece is connected to the carrier, the other connected to the wheel. This reduces drag on the axle by allowing only the spider and side gears to spin, while the differential carrier, pinion and drive shaft are at rest (as is the inner portion of the disconnected long shaft and its associated side gear). The axle is engaged by connecting the two split axle shafts. The ends of the axles are typically splined and use a collar to connect the two shafts together by sliding over both shafts.

== Comparison with locking hubs ==
Although a widely used system, this system is not as efficient as a system with locking hubs. A CAD system spins the axle shafts, spider gears, and side gears in the carrier during normal driving. Locking hubs disengage the axle at the wheels, allowing all of the axle to be at rest during normal driving. Nevertheless, a CAD system still makes for much less drag than having the axle completely locked in (which would spin the axles, differential, driveshaft and part of the internals of the transfer case).

Like locking hubs, the CAD system is designed to improve fuel efficiency of the vehicle. Other, often debated, benefits of CAD systems are reduced vibration, axle wear, and noise, as well as improved steering and drivability.

== Advantages and disadvantages ==
Unlike locking hubs, CAD systems are generally automatic and engaged when the vehicle is placed in four wheel drive. Due to the lack of driver control over the CAD, it is not as well known to the public as manual locking hubs are (but no different from automatic locking hubs in terms of driver involvement, and manual hubs are rare on modern 4x4 vehicles).

Locking hubs are obtrusive and damage can occur that can cause the four wheel drive system to fail — damage that would not be an issue in a CAD system. However CAD systems are mostly vacuum controlled and damage can occur to the vacuum system and to the CAD itself. Rotting of vacuum lines will cause the four wheel drive system to fail — damage that would not be an issue with locking hubs.

== Later CAD systems ==
Ram Trucks used the CAD from 1994-2001. In 2002 it was phased out of the 2500 and 3500, leaving some late models without a CAD system. Ram 2013 model year trucks began using a CAD system again, this time electronically controlled instead of vacuum.
