= Saginaw 9.5-inch axle =

The Saginaw 9.5-inch axle is an automotive axle manufactured by American Axle & Manufacturing, Inc. This differential has three major variants. A rear solid axle, a front solid axle and independent front suspension. General Motor's Saginaw Division started production of this axle in the late 1970s and all three variations are still in production today. The maximum GAWR for this axle is 6000 pounds.

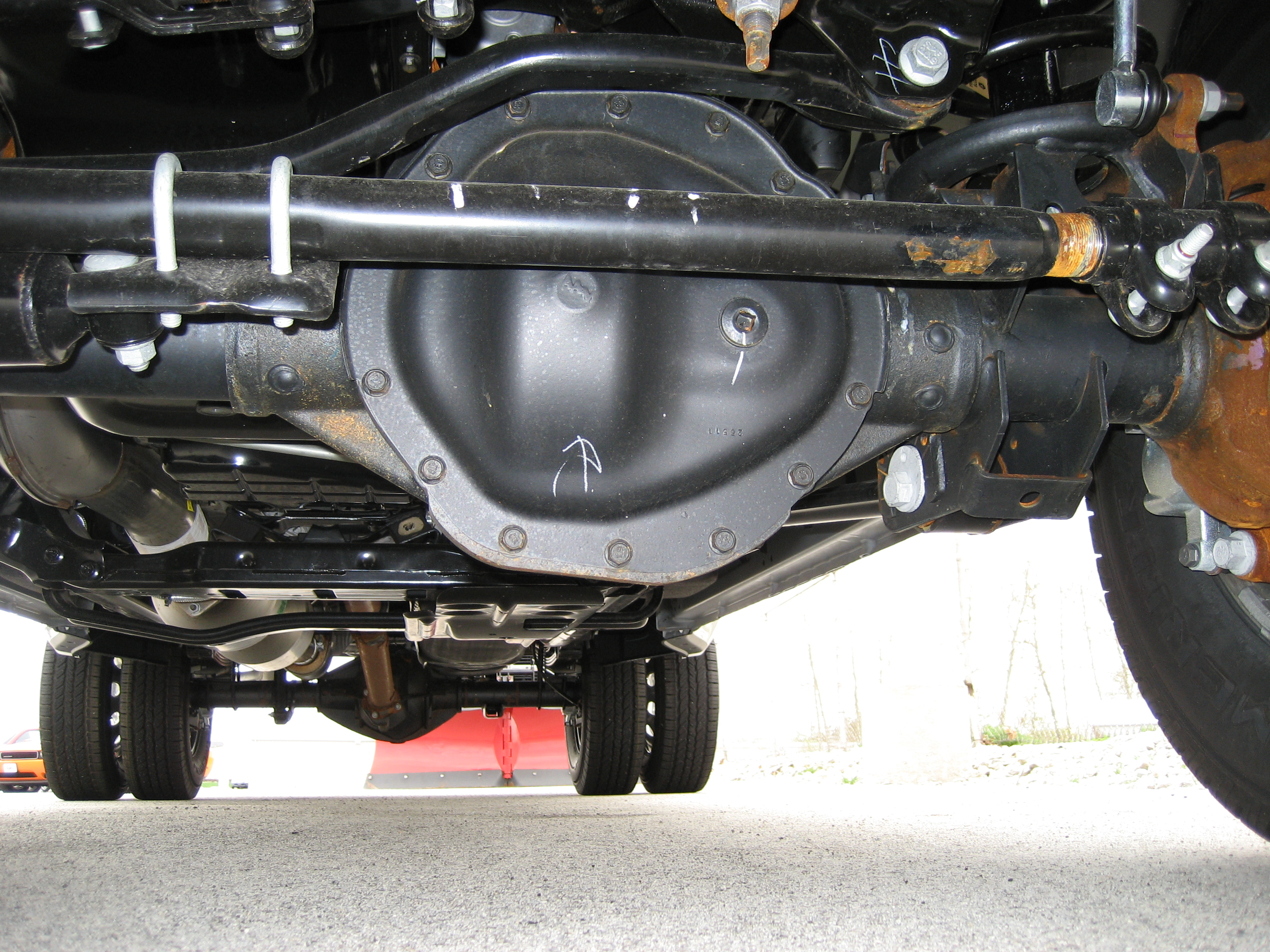
2012 AAM 9.25 in Ram 3500

== Saginaw 9.5-inch rear axle ==
The Saginaw 9.5-inch axle began production in the late 1970s for GM's truck, van and suburban line up. It is a Semi-floating axle made for "light duty" 3/4 Ton vehicles.

== GM 9.25 IFS ==
The GM 9.25 IFS has been the main front differential in Four-wheel drive 3/4 Ton and 1 Ton GM trucks since 1988. The Dana 60 solid axle front end was used selectively in trucks with a higher GVWR from 1988 to 1991. The original Saginaw 9.5 differential, ring and pinion were modified to work with the independent front suspension. The ring and pinion were also reverse-cut as well.

== AAM 9.25 ==
The AAM 9.25 solid axle was developed for 3rd generation Dodge Rams (3/4 and 1 Ton). The axle uses a modified Saginaw 9.5 differential, ring and pinion. The differential housing covers are identical except for one bolt hole at the 3 o’clock position. Model year 2010 and later Rams use larger universal joints than the 2003-2009 models.
