= Ford 9-inch axle =

Motor vehicle part

The Ford 9-inch is an automobile axle manufactured by Ford Motor Company. It is known as one of the most popular axles in automotive history. It was introduced in 1957 model year cars and ended production in 1986, having been phased out in favor of the Ford 8.8 inch axle. However, aftermarket companies still produce the 9-inch design. It is a semi-floating drop-out axle and had a GAWR up to 3,600 lb (1,630 kg).

Early in 1955, Ford’s engineering staff recommended that a new-design rear axle be built for its 1957 model year Ford and Mercury cars, and its 1/2 ton truck. The new unit's differential uses a straddle-mounted pinion gear, which Ford had previously employed with success in its truck axles. The design trend in U.S. cars was then to lower-sitting frames and bodies, but the new axle’s 2.25-inch pinion offset (increased from the 1956 axle’s 1.5 inches) permitted Ford to retain a driveshaft with the conventional two universal joints, rather than having to resort to the more elaborate and expensive three-joint setup.

One of the features which distinguishes this axle from other high-performance or heavy-duty domestic solid axles is that unlike other axle designs, access to the differential gears is not through the rear center cover; rather, in the Ford 9-inch axle, the rear cover is welded to the axle housing, and access to internals is obtained by removing the center cover on the pinion (front) side of the axle through which the driveshaft yoke connects, with the differential assembly coming out of the axle as a unit attached to the cover. Although this requires disconnecting the driveshaft to access the internal gearset, it offers the advantage of being able to disassemble and reassemble the differential gears and adjust clearances conveniently on the benchtop, rather than with the restricted access of working within the axle housing under the car.

== General specifications ==
- Ring gear measures 9.00 in (228.6 mm)
- Factory nodular center sections are usually marked with an "N".
- Factory center section's biggest flaw is the pinion bearing pilot support, which are prone to cracking due to the nature of the pinion gear/crown gear relationship.
- Factory center sections carry two (2) different bearing dimensions (3.0625 and 3.250 in or 77.7875 and 82.5500 mm).
- Factory axle shaft and differential spline count is 28 and 31, although aftermarket axles with 35 and 40 spline count are readily available from reputable manufacturers.
- Wide variety of axle bearing flanges were fabricated.
- Although most factory assemblies carried drum brakes, there were units which were fitted with disc brakes (Thunderbird, etc.).
- Factory axle (wheel) bearings are retained via a press-on collar, and not an internal c-clip inside the differential.
- Axles are straight, and not tapered (which can be cut and resplined, if so needed).

== Common applications ==
- 1957-1986 Ford F-100 & F-150
- 1958-1960 Edsel (All series including Wagons)
- 1976-1980 Ford Granada
- 1976-1979 Lincoln Versailles
- 1957-1970 Ford Fairlane
- 1957-1971 Ford Thunderbird
- 1964 1/2-1973 Ford Mustang
- 1966-1983 Ford Bronco
- 1967-1984 Ford Falcon (Australia)
- 1968-1976 Ford Torino
- 1969-1970 1/2 Ford Falcon (North America)
- 1957-1959 Ranchero and Wagon
- 1967-1973 Ranchero

Note: (Note: Incomplete list. Common applications only.)

== See also ==
- GM 10.5-inch 14-bolt differential
- Dana 60
