= Legacy Classic Trucks =

American manufacturer

- Company type: Private
- Industry: Automotive industry
- Headquarters: Jackson Hole, Wyoming, United States
- Area served: Worldwide
- Products: Automobiles, Aftermarket engines and transmissions
- Owner: Westbank Investments LLC
- Website: www.legacypowerwagon.com

Legacy Classic Trucks is an American manufacturer of aftermarket replica vehicles, accessories, and conversion kits. The company's main product is the Legacy Power Wagon, which is a modern, more powerful recreation of the original 1945–1959 Dodge Power Wagon. All of the company's replica cars have near modern identical interior and exterior parts to the original. The trucks are currently manufactured in Jackson Hole, Wyoming.

== Current automotive models ==
- Legacy Power Wagon: 2door, 4door, and extended cab, replica of the 1945–1959 Dodge Power Wagon
- Legacy Dodge Carryall: Carryall replica of the 1958 Dodge Ram Carryall
- Legacy Scramble Conversion: A modified replica of the Jeep CJ
- Legacy FJ-60 Conversion: A replica of the Toyota Land Cruiser 70
