= Ford 8.8 axle =

American automotive axle

The Ford 8.8 is an automotive axle manufactured by Ford Motor Company at the Sterling Axle Plant in Sterling Heights, MI. It was first used in model year 1983 Ford trucks. The axle was developed to replace the Ford 9-inch axle. This axle is still in production today for a variety of Ford vehicles.

== General Specifications ==
- Ring gear measures 8.8".
- 28 Spline axle shafts with a 1.29" diameter
- 31 Spline axle shafts with a 1.32" diameter
- Ratios: 2.26, 2.47, 2.73, 3.08, 3.27, 3.31, 3.45, 3.55, 3.73, 4.10, 4.56 & 5.14

== 8.8 Solid Axle ==
Ford first used the 8.8 axle in 1983 model year trucks and is still in production for the Ford Ranger and Ford F-Series. It was also used in the Ford SUVs until Independent suspension replaced the solid axle. Ring, pinion and carrier all remained between the solid axle and independent rear suspension.

The solid rear axle from 1995-2001 Explorers is a popular swap for older Jeep Wranglers and Cherokees. In addition to being nearly the same width, they have the same wheel bolt pattern, are equipped with disc brakes, and are much stronger than the Dana 35 they replace.

It was also used in V8 equipped Mustangs from 1986 to the 2014 model years; and all Mustang models from 2011-2014.

=== Common Applications ===
- 1986-2014 Ford Mustang
- 1983-2014 Ford F-150
- 1983-1996 Ford Bronco
- 2001-2005 Ford Explorer Sport Trac
- 1991-2011 Ford Ranger 4.0L models
- 1991-2001 Ford Explorer (Solid axle)
- 1985-2011 Ford Panther platform vehicles

Super 8.8

Ford released an updated version in both solid and IRS form for 2015+ Mustangs and F-150. The most apparent difference is a 12 bolt cover instead of the traditional 10. The super 8.8 also uses larger bearings, longer pinion with larger nut, and most significantly 34 spline axles or half shafts. First Look: Ford Performance Super 8.8-inch Ring And Pinion For S550

== 8.8 Independent Rear Suspension ==
The 8.8 IRS first saw use in the 1989 model year Ford Thunderbird and later Ford adapted independent suspension to its 3rd generation Explorer and 2nd generation Expedition SUVs. The Mustang first used the 8.8 IRS on 1999-2004 Cobra models. The IRS became standard across the Mustang line for the 2015 model year with the "super 8.8."

=== Applications ===
- 1988-1997 Ford Thunderbird
- 1999-2004 Ford Mustang Cobra
- 2003-2010 Ford Explorer
- 2003-2010 Mercury Mountaineer
- 2003-2005 Lincoln Aviator
- 2003-2006 Ford Expedition
- 2003-2006 Lincoln Navigator

== 8.8 Independent Front Suspension ==
The 8.8 IFS was first used in the 1997 model year Ford F-150 and Ford Expedition and has been in use ever since.

=== Applications ===
- 1997-2008 Ford F-150 (28-spline)
- 1997-2008 Ford F-250 (28-spline)
- 1997-2008 Ford Expedition (28-spline)
- 2008-2019 Ford F-150 (31-spline)
- 2008-2019 Ford Expedition (31-spline)
