= GM 10.5-inch 14-bolt differential =

Automotive heavy duty differential

The GM 10.5-inch 14-bolt differential stands as a robust drivetrain component extensively featured in Chevrolet and GMC trucks, SUVs, and vans from 1973 onward, including specific versions of the Cadillac Escalade. Introduced in 1973, this differential employs a full-floating design, boasting a substantial ring gear diameter measuring 10.5 inches (270 mm). Its nomenclature, "14-bolt," represents the 14 bolts securing the differential cover, although the ring gear itself is fastened by 12 bolts. Notably, the 14-bolt differential gained traction among Jeep Wrangler owners seeking axle replacement options, earning the moniker "corporate" 14-bolt because of its association with GM's corporate structure during the 1970s.

Distinguishing it from the GM 14-bolt 9.5-inch ring gear rear differential is the latter's utilization of C-clips to retain axles, differing from the free-floating axle mechanism of its heavy-duty counterpart. Identification between the two can be made by examining the hub: the protrusion of the hub through the center of the wheel denotes the preferred 10.5-inch full-floating rear axle. While the 9.5-inch rear end exhibits its own durability, it is generally considered less favorable for high-torque applications.

The 9.5-inch C-clip rear differential was featured in both the Suburban and pickups, available in 6- or 8-lug variations, employing 33-spline axles. This differential remained in production through 2009 and even found use in vehicles like the TrailBlazer SS, Saab 9-7X, and SSR.

== General specifications ==
- 10.5 in (270 mm) diameter ring gear
- Axles are 30-spline axles
- 1.590 in (40.4 mm) diameter shank on the pinion
- Gear ratios: 3.21, 3.42, 3.73, 4.10, 4.56, 4.88, 5.13, and 5.38
- Carrier break: 3.21:1–4.11:1 and 4.56–5.38
- 1.5 in (38 mm) axle spline diameter
- 1.34 in (34 mm) axle shaft diameter
- Axles are different lengths from side to side
- Removable pinion support
- Weight: 550 pounds (250 kg)
- GAWR: 8,600 pounds (3,900 kg) max.
- Pinion supported with bearings on both sides of the teeth (straddle mount), which minimizes pinion deflection

== Design ==
The initial design of the GM 10.5-inch 14-bolt differential spanned from 1973 to 1984, remaining unaltered until 1986. This iteration featured brake drums secured by wheel studs and utilized a smaller diameter pinion bearing compared to the subsequent design. The second design, in production since 1986, introduced notable improvements. Some models allowed for the removal of the brake drum without requiring hub and axle shaft removal. Additionally, a larger diameter bearing enhanced the durability of the pinion while maintaining its original diameter. Notably, both designs employed a full-floating axle system, bolstering their robustness.

=== Brakes ===
Braking systems in the 14-bolt differentials manufactured until the 1998 model year predominantly incorporated drum brakes. However, select 1999 models with the 14-bolt configuration received upgrades to disc brakes; for example, the new Silverado/Sierra 2500 trucks. Full-size GM vans continued featuring drum brakes for several more years, transitioning entirely to disc brakes by 2003. The original design of the braking system within the 14-bolt differentials accommodated diverse wheel sizes, initially fitting drums suitable for 15-inch wheels and later adapting to cater to the needs of 3/4-ton and 1-ton vehicles. Enthusiasts often opt to convert this section of the axle assembly to disc brakes for enhanced performance and reduced maintenance costs.

=== Pinion ===
The pinion is supported both in front of and behind the pinion teeth, an arrangement often referred to as "straddle mounting." Straddle mounting greatly reduces pinion deflection under high torque loads, conferring increased longevity and torque capacity. The pinion is also removable from the back as well, making for easier access.

=== Re-purposing ===
The 10.5-inch 14-bolt differential and axle is quite popular with Jeep Wrangler owners who want to upgrade their standard Dana 30, Dana 35, or Dana 44 axle. While the 10.5-inch 14-bolt axle is heavier than the standard Dana axles offered on the Wrangler, it is much stronger. This increased strength allows Jeep Wrangler owners to mount up to 44-inch tires with sticky compound without concern about axle shaft breakage. Additionally, for Wrangler owners with high-horsepower GM LS engines, the 14-bolt can handle the engines' increased stress. Many Wrangler owners will have up to two inches removed from the bottom of the 10.5-inch 14-bolt differential housing to maximize ground clearance.

The popularity of GM trucks and vans made 10.5-inch 14-bolt axles a common sight in junkyards, making them an option for vehicle customization projects, including buggy builds and even classic trucks.

== 11.5 AAM ==
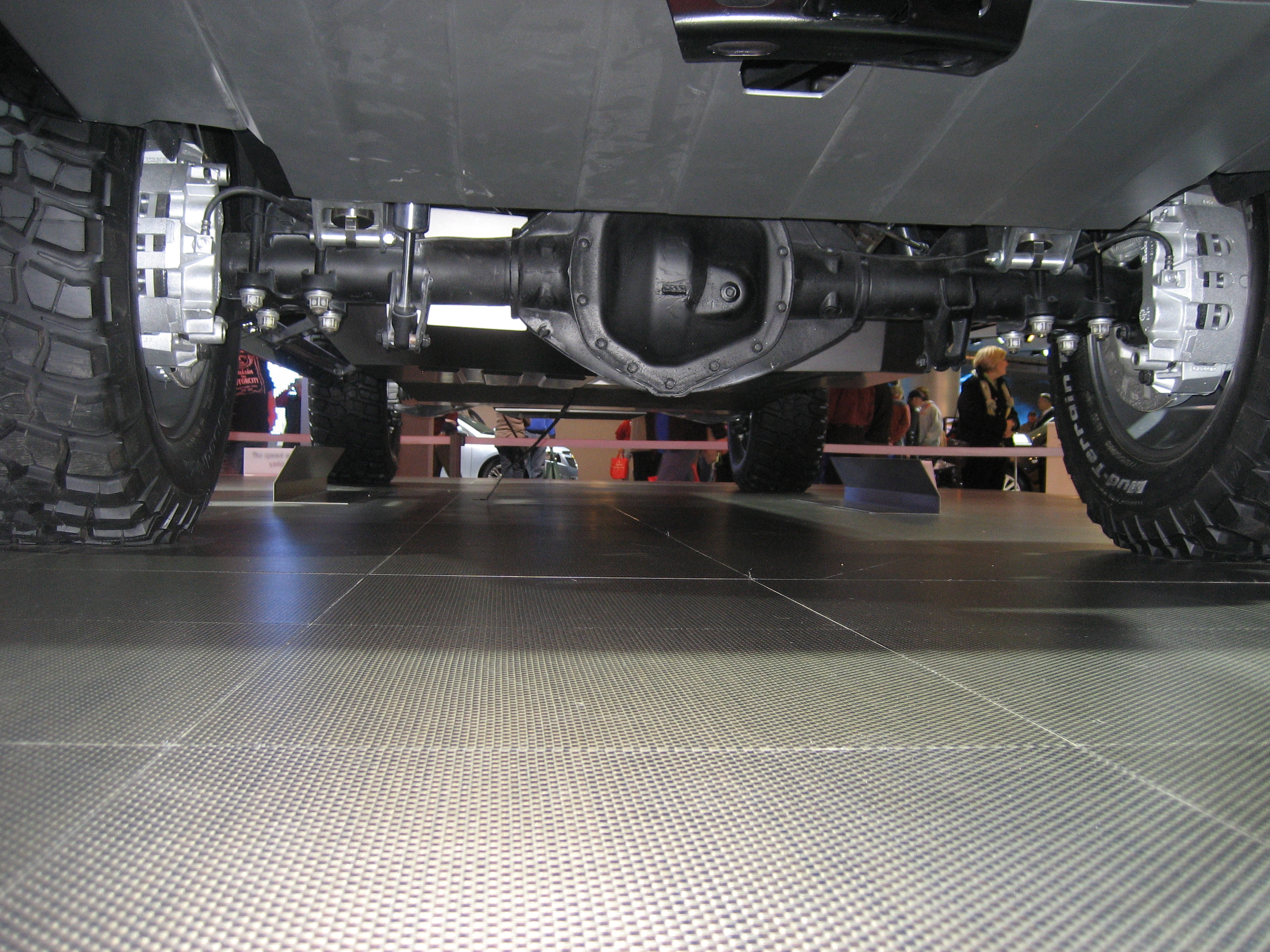
GMC All Terrain concept truck with 11.5 AAM axle

The 11.5 AAM 14-bolt rear differential started replacing the 10.5-inch 14-bolt in Chevrolet Silverado and GMC Sierra trucks from the 2001 model year onwards. However, the 10.5-inch 14-bolt axle remains in production today, specifically utilized in GMC Savana and Chevrolet Express vans. Notably, the 11.5-inch 14-bolt axle is featured in third-generation Dodge Ram 2500 and 3500 trucks.

There are discernible differences between the GM and Ram versions, evident in the gaskets used and the axle cover designs. The GM AAM axle tubes exhibit a smaller diameter at the spindle compared to the AAM Dodge axles—measuring 4 inches for GM and 3.5 inches for Dodge from the housing. In design variation, newer GM trucks are aligned with Dodge axles. Additionally, GM incorporates a vibration damper on the yoke, while Dodge positions it on the drive shaft. This configuration became the standard axle across all Ram 2500 and 3500 trucks starting from the 2014 model year.

=== Features ===
- Increased GAWR: 6,900 pounds (3,100 kg) Max.
- 1541 alloy axle shafts
- Larger ring and pinion versus the "14-bolt" axle, although the pinion lacks support bearings similar to the 14-bolt design.
- Selectable locking differential available on the 2014–present Ram Power Wagon.

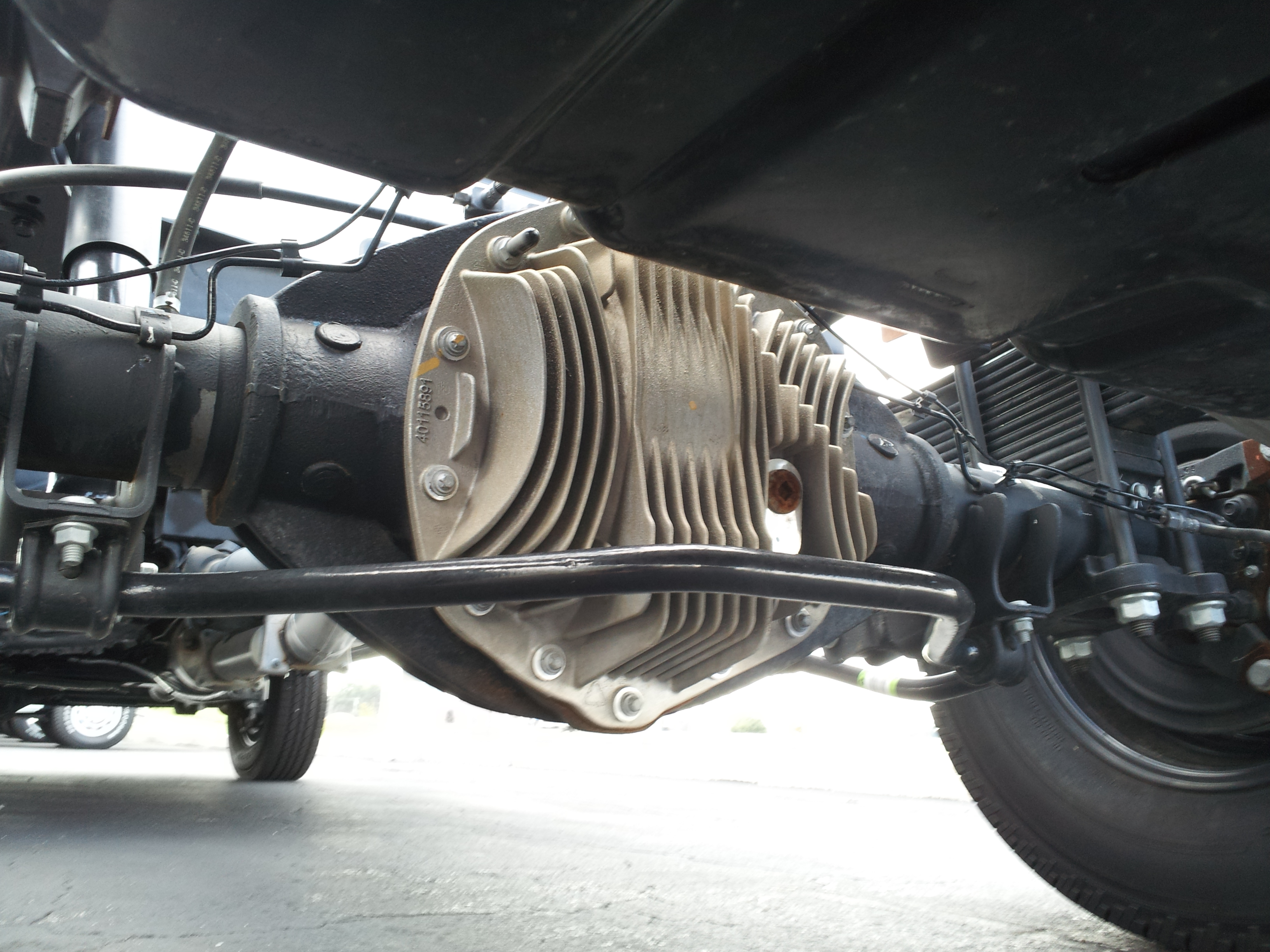
11.8 AAM axle, optioned on Ram 3500 trucks with the High Output package

== 10.5 AAM ==
In third-generation Dodge Ram 2500 trucks, the 10.5 AAM axle was used in all V8-equipped trucks, with some early-model diesel and V10 trucks also adopting this axle. Similar to the 11.5 variant, this axle also features a reusable rubber gasket and bears a resemblance to the 11.5 axle in its appearance. Notably, the Ram Power Wagon incorporates this axle type equipped with a locking differential. The 2013 model year marked the final usage of this axle configuration in the Ram 2500 and 3500 trucks.

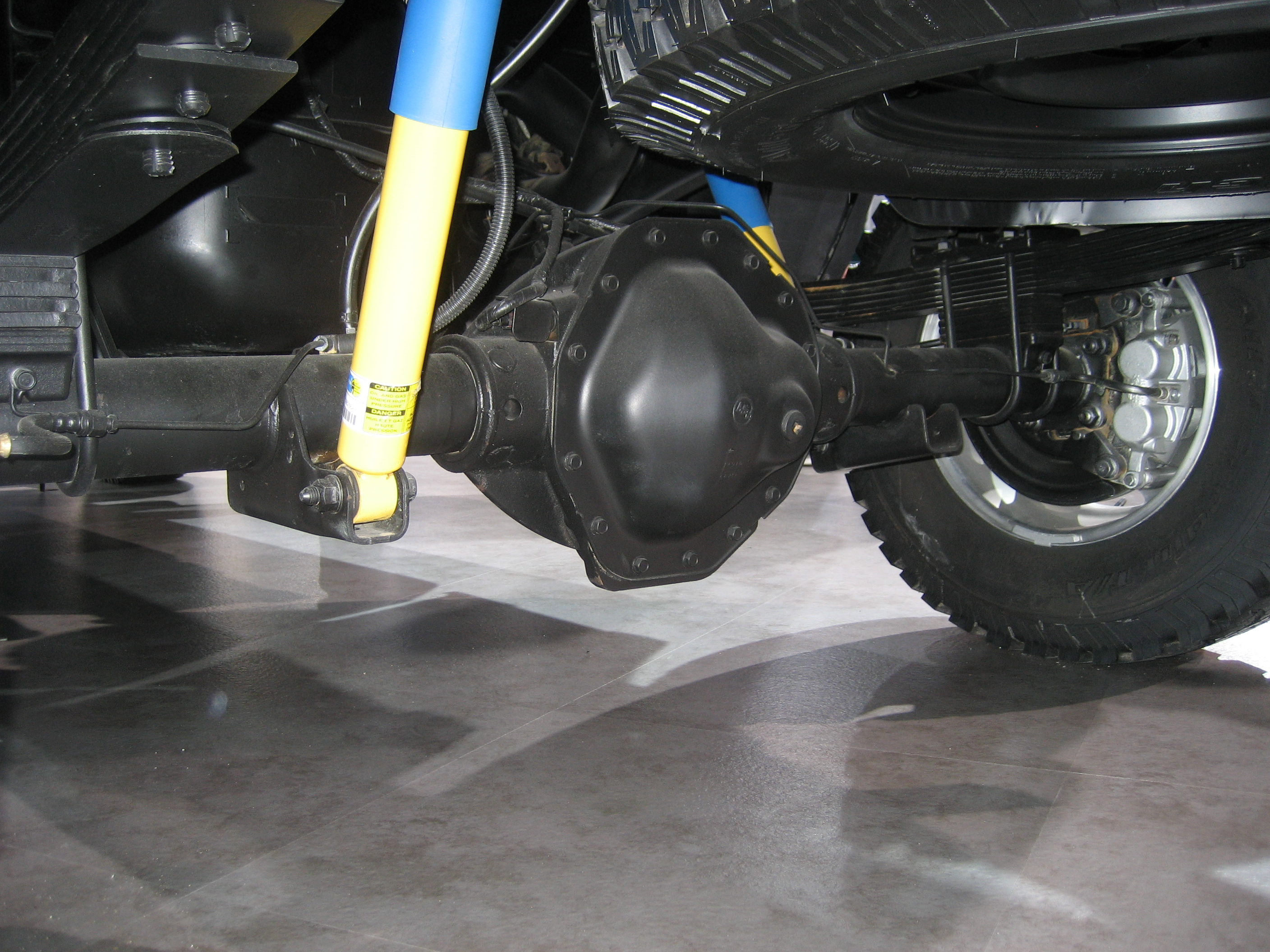
2011 Ram Power Wagon 10.5 AAM with electric locking differential

== See also ==
- Powertrain
- Gear train
- Dana 60
- Ford 9-inch axle
