= Locking hubs =

Vehicle component

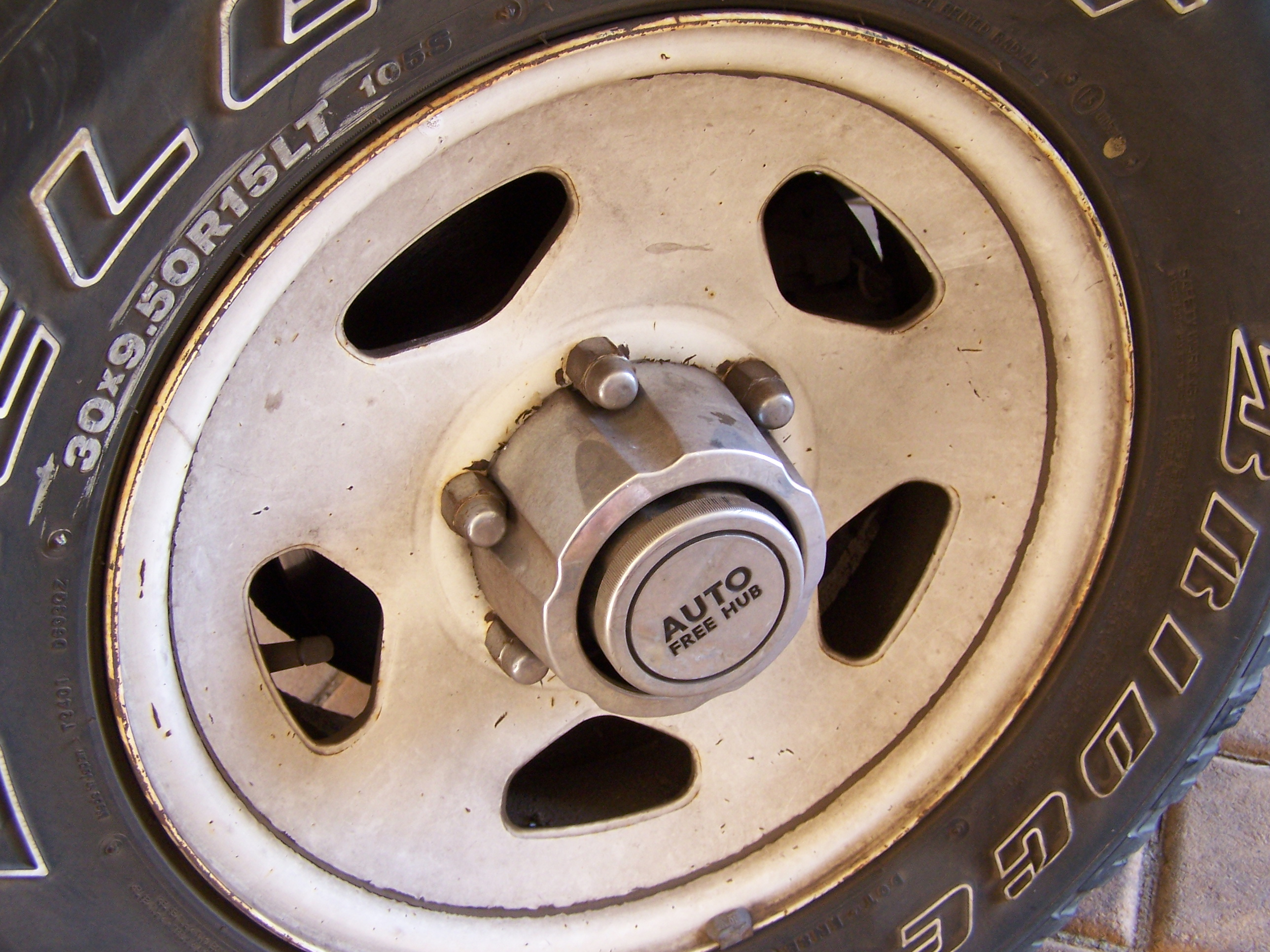
Automatic free wheeling hub of a 1986 Mitsubishi Pajero

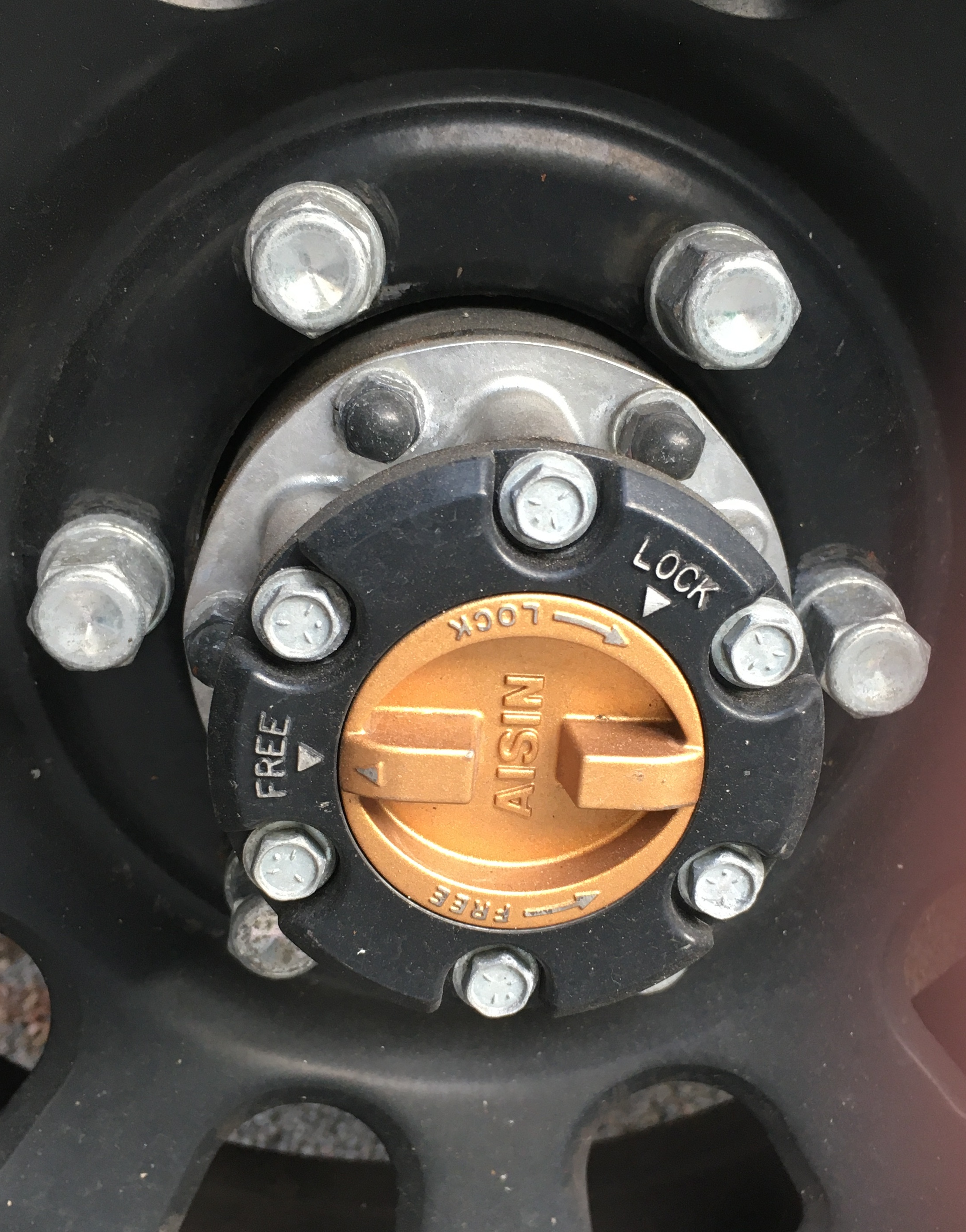
Mechanically (manually) activated free wheeling hub on a Toyota Land Cruiser J60 from the 1980s, with marked turning positions free and lock

Locking hubs, also known as free wheeling hubs are fitted to some (mainly older) four-wheel drive vehicles, allowing the front wheels to rotate freely when disconnected (unlocked) from the front axle. This is done to reduce the mechanical resistance of the front-portion of the drivetrain when four-wheel drive is not in use. The hub, along with the wheel, is designed to engage (lock) onto the axle, to be powered by the drivetrain in four-wheel drive; or the hub can disengage (unlock) from the axle when four-wheel drive is not needed, thus allowing the front wheels to rotate freely within the hub. The hub is a component where the wheel is directly mounted to, and is outside the axle.

The benefits of unlocking hubs for normal road use are mainly found in increased fuel efficiency. When the front hubs are locked, even if no power is sent to the front axle (by means of a transfer case), the turning of the wheels will still spin the front axle, differential, and driveshaft, which puts extra load on the engine. Unlocking the hubs disconnects the wheels from the axle, which eliminates this extra load. Other benefits also include keeping the front-differential free from unnecessary wear, quieter operation, less vibration, and lower wear in other drive line components. However, many manufacturers list engaging the hubs (even in 2WD mode) for several miles a month to lubricate the front drive train as part of the vehicle's regular maintenance schedule.

Mechanically activated locking hubs are activated by hand by turning a switch on the end of the axle. The advantage to mechanical hubs is that they are often considered more robust, and less prone to issues due to maintenance negligence. The disadvantage of this is that the driver needs to get out of the vehicle to activate the hubs.

In some other vehicles, automatic locking hubs are used which, as the name implies, engage automatically when 4WD is engaged. The main advantage is that the driver does not need to leave the vehicle to connect the wheels to the axle. The disadvantage with this system is that most designs require the vehicle to move some distance (usually a whole wheel turn, often going backwards) after engaging the hubs in order for the hubs to engage or disengage. This might not be possible if the vehicle gets completely stuck (due to a lack of torque and/or traction) before the hubs have been engaged, meaning automatic hubs require more caution on the driver's part. Most modern vehicles with automatic hubs, automatically lock their hubs when using low range gearbox, making it difficult or impossible to use torque multiplication in conjunction with FWD or RWD.

Locking hub mechanisms also generally extend further beyond the wheel than most axles, and exposed hub locks can be broken or damaged by off-road conditions, rendering 4×4 useless and leaving the vehicle stranded. Also, in some axle designs (such as those used on older Land Rovers), the top swivel bearing can become starved for lubrication (which is normally supplied by oil slung up by the rotating axle), unless the hubs are locked every few hundred miles. Also, since locking hubs generally do not require a key to operate, they can be maliciously locked or unlocked by persons other than the vehicle owner.

== See also ==
- Freewheel
- Full spool
