= Dauch Corporation =

American automobile components manufacturer

- Company type: Public
- Traded as: NYSE: DCH; S&P 600 component
- Industry: Automotive industry
- Founded: 1994
- Founders: Richard E. "Dick" Dauch and James W. McLernon
- Headquarters: Detroit, Michigan, U.S.
- Area served: Worldwide
- Products: Drivetrains; Metal Forming
- Revenue: ▲US$ 6.27 billion (FY 2017)
- Operating income: ▲US$ 223.4 million (FY 2011)
- Net income: ▲US$ 337.1 million (FY 2017)
- Total assets: ▲US$ 2.3 billion (FY 2011)
- Total equity: ▲US$ -419.6 million (FY 2011)
- Number of employees: 25,000 (2017)
- Subsidiaries: Albion Automotive, United Kingdom
- Website: www.dauch.com

Dauch Corporation, formerly American Axle & Manufacturing, Inc. (AAM), headquartered in Detroit, Michigan, is an American manufacturer of automobile driveline and drivetrain components and systems.

== History ==
American Axle & Manufacturing (AAM) was founded in 1994 when a private investor group, led by Richard E. "Dick" Dauch, James W. McLernon, Raymond Park and Morton E. Harris purchased the Final Drive and Forge Business Unit from GM's Saginaw Division.

In 1999, AAM went public, and was traded as "AXL" on the New York Stock Exchange (NYSE) until becoming "DCH" on its 2026 renaming to Dauch. AAM grew to supply various OEM manufacturers around the globe in the passenger car, light truck, and commercial vehicle segments.

The company's World Headquarters building, erected in 2004, is located on the Detroit/Hamtramck border.

AAM was renamed Dauch in 2026.

== 2008 strike ==
On February 26, 2008, approximately 4600 AAM employees went on what would be a three-month-long strike to protest a proposed wage and benefit cut by the company's management. The proposal would reduce production workers' hourly wage from $28 to $18 and cut skilled trade wages $5 per hour. The strike cost General Motors $2.6 billion as the automaker lost the production of its Chevrolet Malibu sedan and other vehicles.

== 2026 strike ==
On midnight at June 1, 2026, the United Auto Workers declared a strike at Dauch's Three Rivers production facility, affecting nearly 1,000 employees, in response to Dauch failing to reach a deal with the union regarding wage hikes before the May 31 deadline. UAW president Shawn Fain criticized the company for making an "empire of profit" of $8.4 billion since the UAW agreed to drop wages in 2008. In response to the strike, the company stated it "believes that the best outcomes for everyone – our Associates, the union, and the Company – are reached at the bargaining table. We remain committed to negotiating with the union in good faith and hope to promptly reach a fair agreement."

== Products ==
Key products include axles, drive shafts, front axle, universal joints and sealing and thermal-management products.

=== Axles ===
- 10.5" Corporate 14 Bolt Differential
- Saginaw 9.5-inch axle

== Demolition ==
After closing its factories in Detroit in 2012, American Axle and Manufacturing had started a demolition project. In late 2013, much of the old manufacturing facility had been demolished by bulldozers and cranes. Also, in February 2014, it was reported and confirmed that most of the Detroit/Hamtramck manufacturing site had been sold to a California-based Industrial Realty Group, IRG LLC who specialize in the use of industrial buildings for other developments such as apartment complexes. In 2014, American Axle continued to own its headquarters and greenbelt property at the site. It planned to build an engineering facility in the sole building left standing from the original manufacturing complex.

== UK subsidiary ==
Albion Automotive is a Glasgow-based subsidiary.

In 2002, the Court of Appeal ruled in a case brought by staff employed at Albion's Farington site in Lancashire, Albion Automotive Ltd w. Walker and others, that a contractual term entitling employees to an enhanced redundancy payment could be implied into the employees' contracts of employment based on the employer's custom and practice.

== US competitors ==
- Meritor
- Dana
