= List of Dodge vehicles =

List of vehicles from American brand

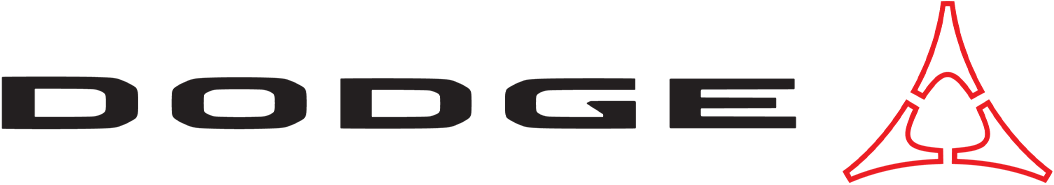
Dodge Logo (2025–)

Dodge, an American brand of Stellantis, has produced numerous vehicles carrying the brand name including pickup trucks, SUVs, and vans.

== Current production models ==
Vehicles currently not sold in the United States

Model	Calendar year introduced	Current model		Vehicle description
Model	Calendar year introduced	Introduction	Update/facelift	Vehicle description
Cars
Attitude	2006	2024	–	Compact sedan marketed in Mexico, rebadged Trumpchi Empow.
Charger	1966	2024	–	Full-size, rear-wheel-drive (AWD optional) muscle sedan and coupe. Available as a gas powered model or an EV.
SUVs
Durango	1997	2011	2021	Mid-size SUV/crossover.
Journey	2021	2021	–	Compact SUV/crossover marketed in Mexico, rebadged Trumpchi GS5.

== Former production models (automobiles) ==
The following list includes only automobiles. Utility vehicles / SUVs / trucks, are listed separately below.

=== United States ===
==== 1910s–1940s ====
Name	First	Last	Image
30-35	1914	1916	
Fast Four	1927	1928	
D5/D6/D7	1937	1937	
D8/D9/D10	1938	1938	
Coronet	1949	1959	
Coronet	1965	1976	
Custom	1946	1949	
Kingsway (Note: Rebadged Plymouth vehicle.)	194?	1959	
Meadowbrook	1949	1954	
Wayfarer	1949	1952	

==== 1950s ====
Name	First	Last	Image
Custom Royal	1955	1959	
1955	1955	1956	
La Femme	1955	1956	
Lancer	1955	1962	
Royal	1954	1959	

==== 1960s ====
Name	First	Last	Image
330	1962	1964	
440	1962	1964	
Charger (1966)	1966	1978	
Charger Daytona	1969	1970	
Custom 880	1962	1965	
Challenger (1970)	1970	1974	
Dart	1960	1976	
Matador	1959	1960	
Monaco	1965	1992	
Polara	1960	1973	
Super Bee (Note: Based on the Dodge Coronet. The Super Bee name was later applied to the 1971 Dodge Charger and again in the 2000s.)	1968	1971	

==== 1970s–1980s ====
Name	First	Last	Image
Aspen	1976	1980	
Diplomat	1977	1989	
Magnum (Note: The name Magnum was revived in 2005 for a performance wagon model.)	1978	1979	
St. Regis	1979	1981	
400	1982	1983	
600	1982	1988	
Aries (Note: Rebadged Plymouth.)	1981	1989	
Charger (1981)	1982	1987	
Daytona	1984	1993	
Dynasty	1988	1993	
Lancer (relaunch) (Note: Unlike the original Lancer, this version was a rebadged Chrysler LeBaron.)	1985	1989	
Mirada	1980	1983	
Shadow	1987	1994	
Spirit	1989	1995	

==== 1990s ====
Name	First	Last	Image
Avenger	1995	2000	
Intrepid	1993	2004	
Neon (Note: Rebadged Chrysler and Plymouth model.)	1993	2005	
Stratus	1994	2006	
Viper	1992	2010	

==== 2000s–present ====
Name	First	Last	Image
Avenger Sedan	2007	2014	
Charger Daytona (relaunch)	2006	2020	
Charger (2005)	2006	2023	
Challenger (2008)	2008	2023	
Caliber	2007	2012	
Dart (PF) (Note: Launched by then Fiat Chrysler (FCA), marketed in Europe as a Fiat (with several names).)	2012	2016	
Neon (relaunch)	2016	2021	
Viper (VX I)	2013	2017	

=== Global ===
The following list includes original "Dodge" models designed outside the US or rebadged models from other manufacturers/brands.

==== 1950s–1970s ====
Name	Orig.	First	Last	Image
Crusader	CAN	1951	1958	
Husky (Note: Rebadged Rootes Arrow.)	UK	1970	1979	
Mayfair	CAN	1953	1959	
Regent	CAN	1951	1959	
Viscount (Note: Rebadged Plymouth Fury.)	CAN	1959	1959	
Phoenix	AUS	1960	1972	
1500 (Note: rebadged Hillman Avenger.)	UK	1970	1981	
Alpine (Note: Marketed in Latin America as "Dodge Alpine". In the UK, it was marketed as "Chrysler Alpine".)	FRA	1975	1986	
Arrow (Note: A rebadged Mitsubishi.)	JPN	1973	1981	
Colt	JPN	1971	1994	
Colt Challenger	JPN	1976	1984	
Dart/Charger	BRA	1970	1979	
Magnum (Note: Took the name from the US 1970s model. Built in Brazil 1979–81, and Mexico 1981–82.)	BRA; MEX	1979	1982	
Omni (Note: rebadged European Chrysler Horizon.)	UK	1978	1990	
Omni 024	UK	1979	1982	
SE	AUS	1971	1976	

==== 1980s–present ====
Name	Orig.	First	Last	Image
Colt Vista (Note: Mitsubishi Chariot rebadging.)	JPN	1983	2003	
Conquest (Note: Mitsubishi Starion rebadging.)	JPN	1983	1989	
Attitude (Note: Marketed under the "Attitude" name in Mexico from its 3rd. generation.)	KOR	2005	2019	
Stealth (Note: Mitsubishi 3000 rebadging.)	JPN	1991	1996	
Brisa (Note: Marketed in Venezuela, rebadged from Hyundai Accent (1st. gen) and Getz (2nd. gen).)	KOR	2002	2009	
i10 (Note: Rebadged Hyundai, marketed in Mexico (1st. gen only).)	KOR	2007	2015	

== Former production models (other vehicles) ==
=== SUVs / utilities ===
Name	Orig.	First	Last	Image
Ramcharger	USA	1974	1993	
Rampage (Note: Had a rebadged model, the Plymouth Scamp.)	USA	1982	1984	
Magnum (relaunch)	USA	2005	2008	
Nitro	USA	2007	2012	
Journey	USA	2009	2020	
Hornet (Note: Rebadged Alfa Romeo Tonale.)	ITA	2022	2026	

=== Vans / minivans ===
Name	Orig.	First	Last	Image
Town Panel	USA	1954	1966	
A100	USA	1964	1970	
Space Van (Note: After Rootes Group was purchased by Chrysler, the SpaceVan (previously commercialised by Commer) was also sold under the Dodge, DeSoto and Fargo marques.)	UK	1967	1978	
Ram Van	USA	1970	2003	
Caravan	USA	1984	2020	
1000 (Note: Rebadged Mitsubishi, marketed in Mexico.)	JPN	1986	2007?	
Sprinter (Note: Rebadged Mercedes-Benz Sprinter.)	GER	2003	2009	

=== Trucks ===
==== United States ====
Name	First	Last	Image
T Series	1939	1947	
WC Series (Note: Military vehicles, also produced under the 'Fargo' brand.)	1940	1945	
Power Wagon	1945	1980	
B Series	1948	1953	
C Series	1954	1960	
D Series	1960	1993	
LCF Series	1960	1976	
Travco (Note: Produced by RV manufacturer Travco, sold with Dodge branding)	1964	late 1980s	
Ram 50	1979	1986	
Dakota	1987	2011	

==== Global ====
Name	Orig.	First	Last	Image
100 Kew	UK	1949	1957	
300	UK	1957	1965	
500	UK	1964	1977	
100 Commando	UK	1970s	1980s	
50 Series	UK	1979	1983	
D50 / Ram 50 (Note: Rebadged Mitsubishi Triton.)	JPN	1979	1994	
H100 (Note: Rebadged Hyundai, marketed in Mexico.)	KOR	2003	2020?	
