= Dodge Town Panel and Town Wagon =

Dodge Town Wagon Dodge Town Panel
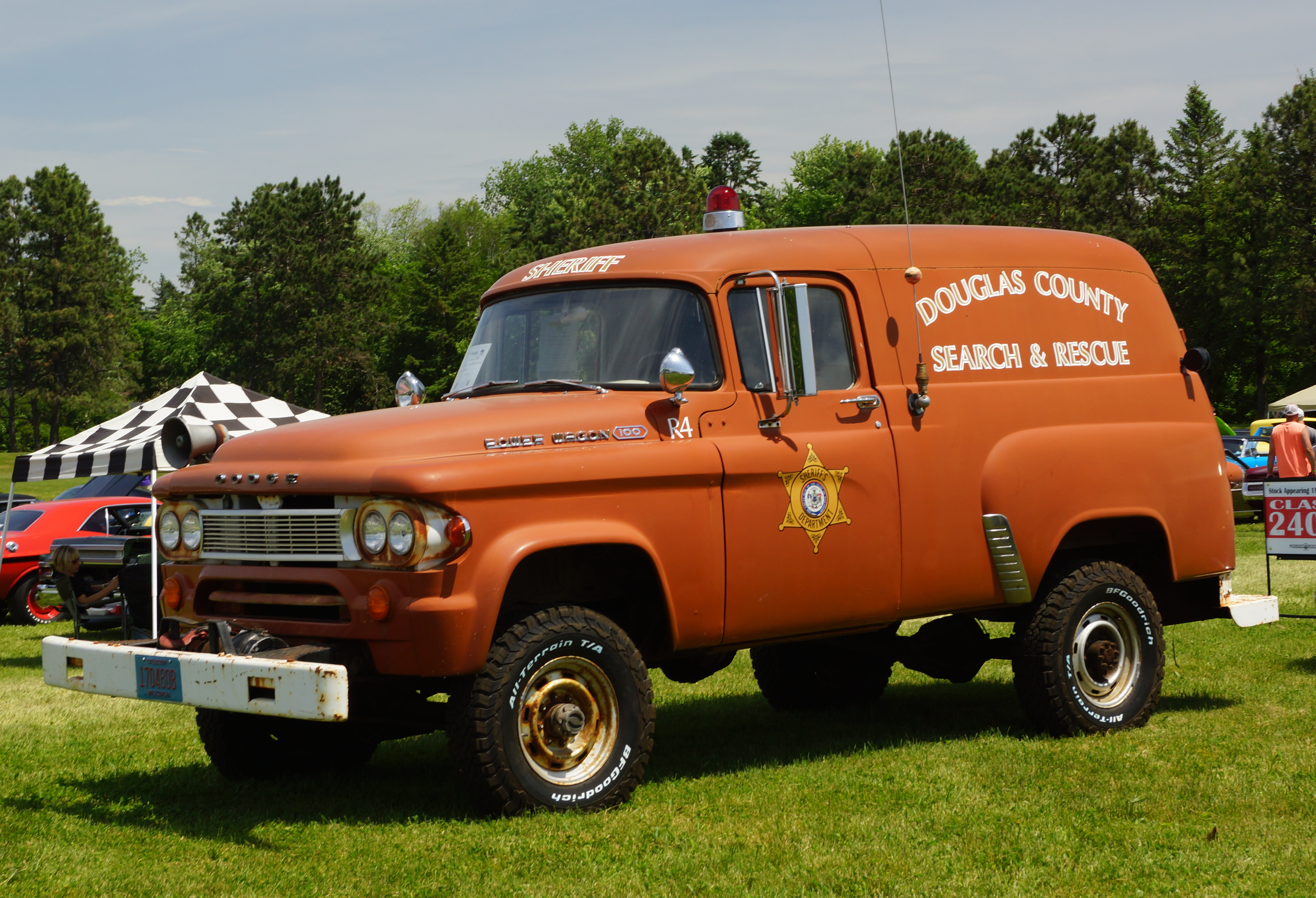
- 1965 Dodge Power Wagon W-100 Town Panel

Overview
- Manufacturer: Dodge
- Production: 1954–1966 (U.S.); 1954–1971 (Argentina)
- Assembly: Warren Truck Assembly (Warren, Michigan)

Body and chassis
- Class: Van (Town Panel); SUV (Town Wagon)
- Body style: 2-door van 2-door SUV
- Layout: FR layout
- Related: Dodge C series Dodge LCF series

Powertrain
- Engine: 230 cu in (3.8 L) I6; 315 cu in (5.2 L) V8; 318 cu in (5.2 L) V8; 331 cu in (5.4 L) V8

Dimensions
- Wheelbase: 108 in (2,743 mm); 116 in (2,946 mm)

Chronology
- Successor: Dodge Ramcharger (Town Wagon); Dodge A100 (Town Panel)

The Dodge Town Panel and Dodge Town Wagon are respectively a panel truck and a carryall, manufactured between 1954 and 1966 in the U.S. and between 1954 and 1971 in Argentina by Dodge. The Town Panel and Town Wagon trucks were based upon the design of the Dodge C series pickup trucks with round fenders and wraparound windshields. Even after the Dodge D series "Sweptline" pickup trucks with square fenders and flat windshields were released, the Town Wagons retained the 1958 sheet metal design of the C series pickups and LCF heavy-duty trucks. They were produced until 1966, when the Dodge A100 commercial and passenger vans eliminated the need for the pickup chassis version. A passenger sport utility version of a Dodge pick-up truck was not again developed until the Dodge D series–based Dodge Ramcharger, a competitor to the Chevrolet K5 Blazer.

== Town Panel ==
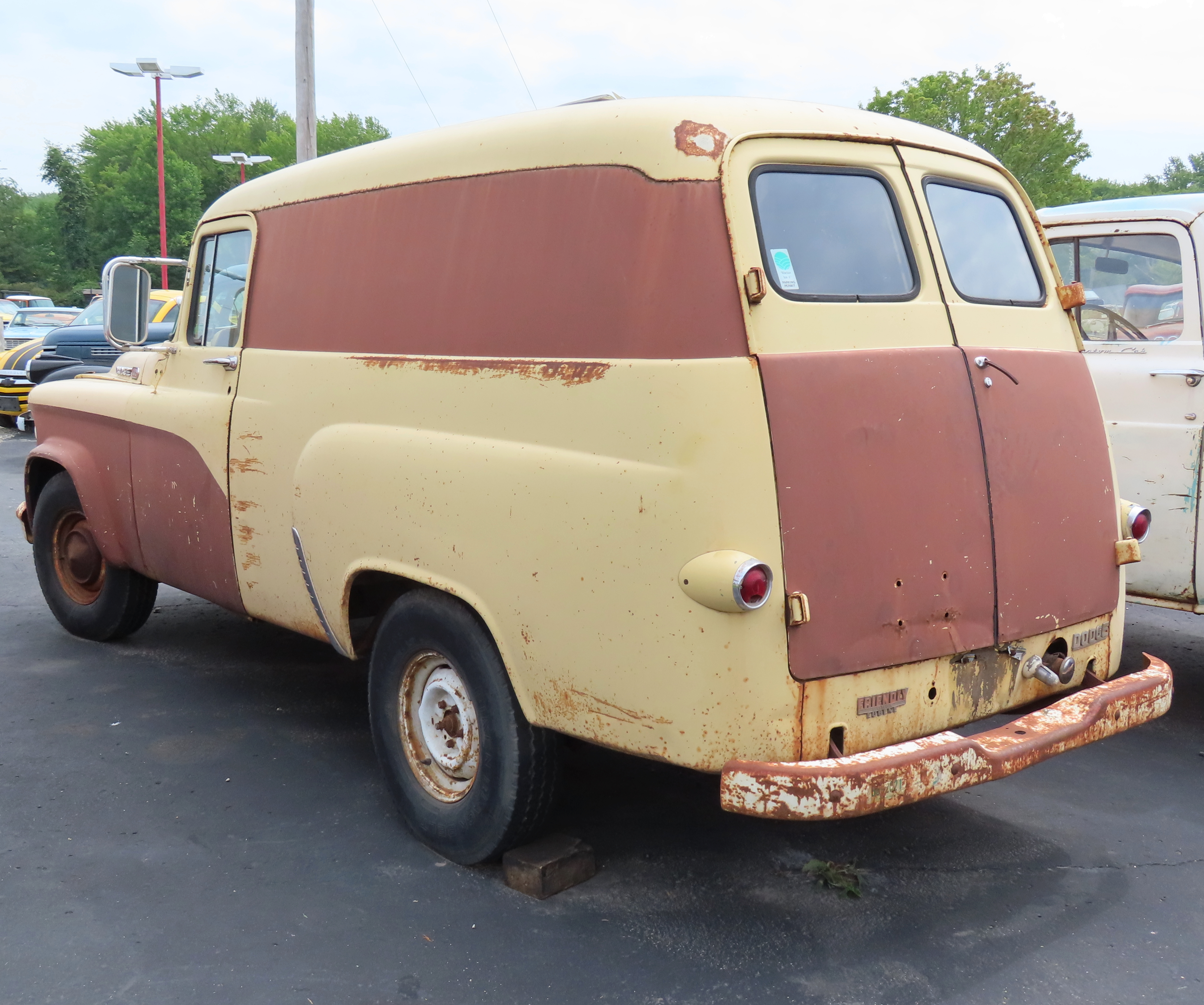
1963 Dodge D100 Town Panel, rear view

The Town Panel truck was introduced in 1954 as a panel truck variant of the Dodge C series pick-up truck. At the 1954 Chicago Auto Show, a golden Town Panel truck in a "jewel box setting" was used to celebrate the 50th (golden) anniversary of the Chicago Automobile Trade Association. The new Dodge Town Panel styling was heavily promoted. It proved to be popular with local delivery companies, such as Montgomery Ward. The Town Panel had no windows or seats behind the driver and was a commercial-use vehicle. It was designed to protect loads from weather and pilferage. Dodge had previously built panel-delivery trucks on their B series and older truck chassis prior to the Town Panel, but did not specifically market them separately.

== Town Wagon ==
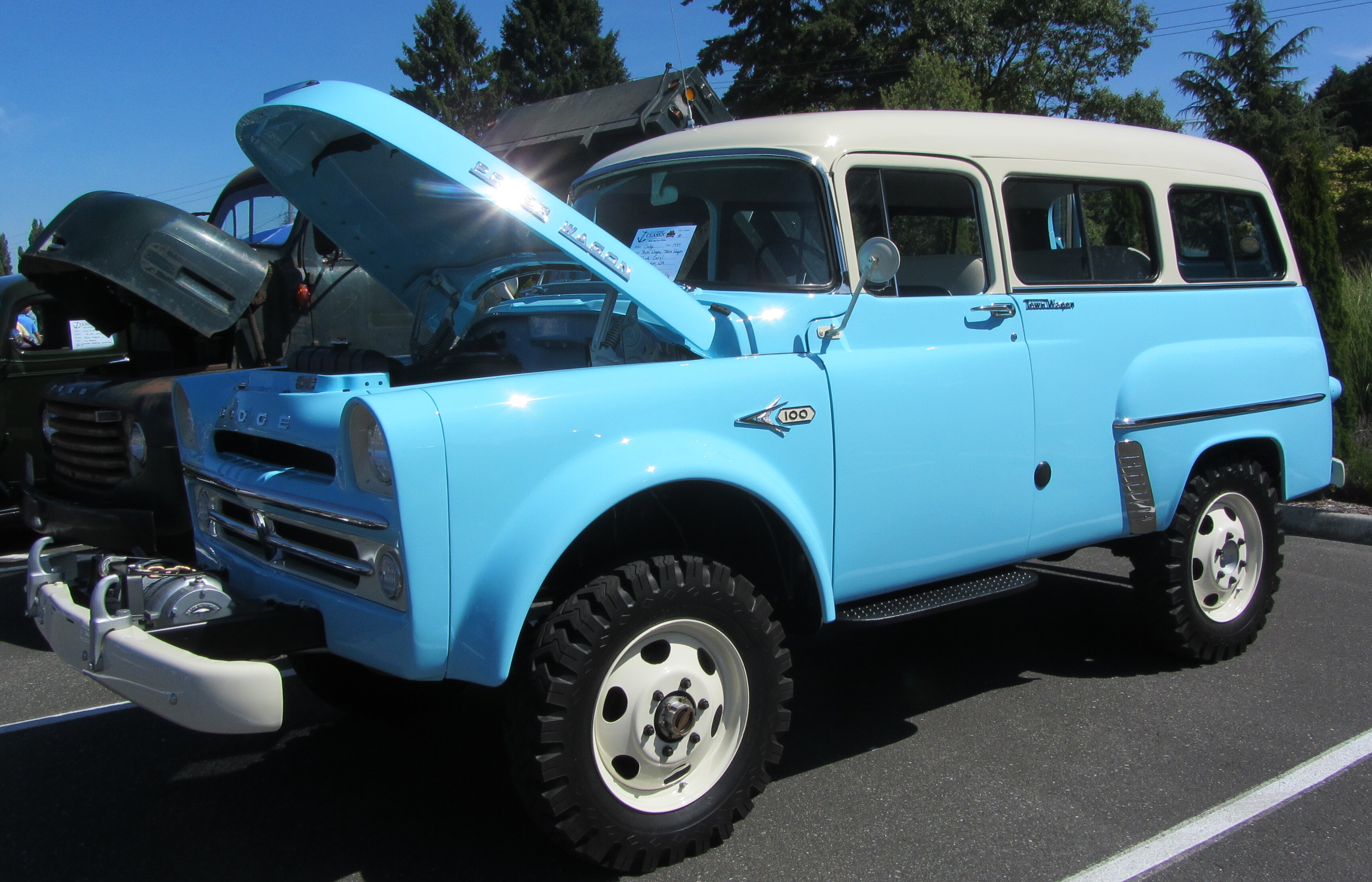
1957 Dodge Town Wagon

The Town Wagon was introduced in 1956. It was a passenger version of the Town Panel with rear passenger windows. It had two bench seats and upholstery for a passenger vehicle. It competed with the Chevrolet Suburban and International Harvester Travelall, station wagons built upon pickup truck chassis. The Town Wagon, along with truck-chassis wagon competitors from Chevrolet, Jeep, and International, were precursors to the SUV. As American cars were built lower to the ground to run on newer highways and interstates, sportsmen needed higher-riding vehicles to go onto more primitive roads, and this was a market where the Town Wagon proved relatively popular. Dodge would not market another SUV with an optional third row of seats until the 1998 Dodge Durango.

== Town Wagon Power Wagon ==
The Town Wagon in factory four-wheel-drive configuration was called the Town Wagon Power Wagon. It was offered starting in 1957. The Dodge C series vehicles were given the W-100 designation for their now-available half-ton four-wheel-drive versions. It had a higher stance and larger fender flares. It gained a "Power Wagon" fender badge, along with the W series "Sweptline" pickup trucks, linking it to the Dodge Power Wagon WC300 "Military Type."
