= Dodge LCF series =

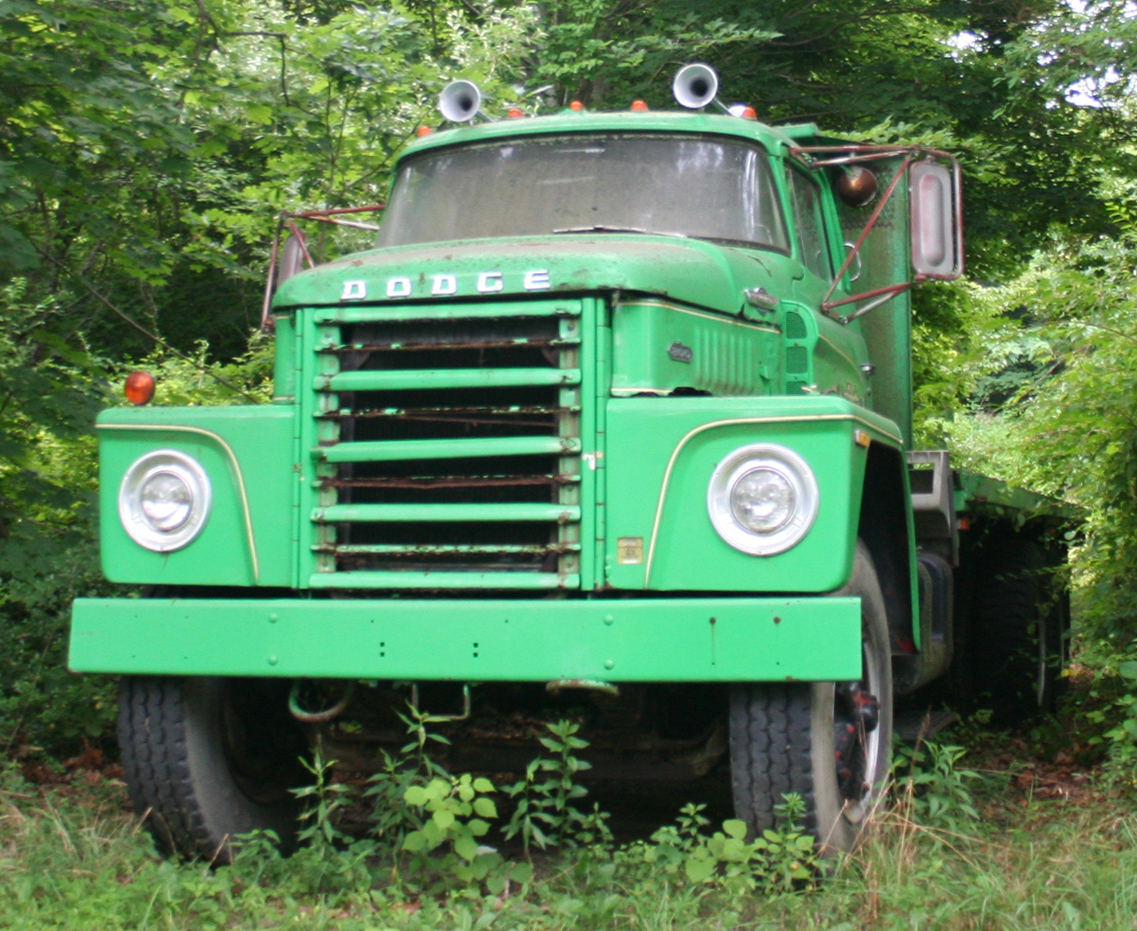

Overview
- Manufacturer: Dodge (Chrysler)
- Also called: Dodge C/CT series Dodge NC/NCT series Dodge PC/PD series Fargo LCF
- Production: 1960–1976
- Assembly: Warren, Michigan, United States (Sherwood Assembly); Bogotá, Colombia (Chrysler Colmotores: 1967–1978)

Body and chassis
- Class: Heavy-duty truck
- Body style: 2-door truck
- Layout: Front engine, rear-wheel drive
- Related: Dodge C series

Powertrain
- Engine: Gasoline: 318 cu in (5.2 L) A V8; 361 cu in (5.9 L) B V8; 413 cu in (6.8 L) RB V8; 478 cu in (7.8 L) IH LV V8; 537 cu in (8.8 L) IH LV V8; Diesel: 354 cu in (5.8 L) Perkins 6.354 I6; Caterpillar units; Cummins units; Detroit Diesel units

Dimensions
- Wheelbase: 121–212 in (3,073–5,385 mm)

Chronology
- Predecessor: Dodge COE

The Dodge LCF (for "Low Cab Forward") was a series of medium- and heavy-duty trucks built by Dodge from 1960 until 1976. They replaced the Dodge COE range of cabover trucks built in the 1950s. The 500 through 700 series were medium duty only, while 800 through 1000 series were reserved for heavy-duty versions.

The LCF range was also sold in Canada with the Fargo badge. In addition, following Chrysler Corporation policy of badge engineering to provide a greater number of sales outlets overseas, LCFs were also marketed in some countries with the De Soto badge.

== Description ==
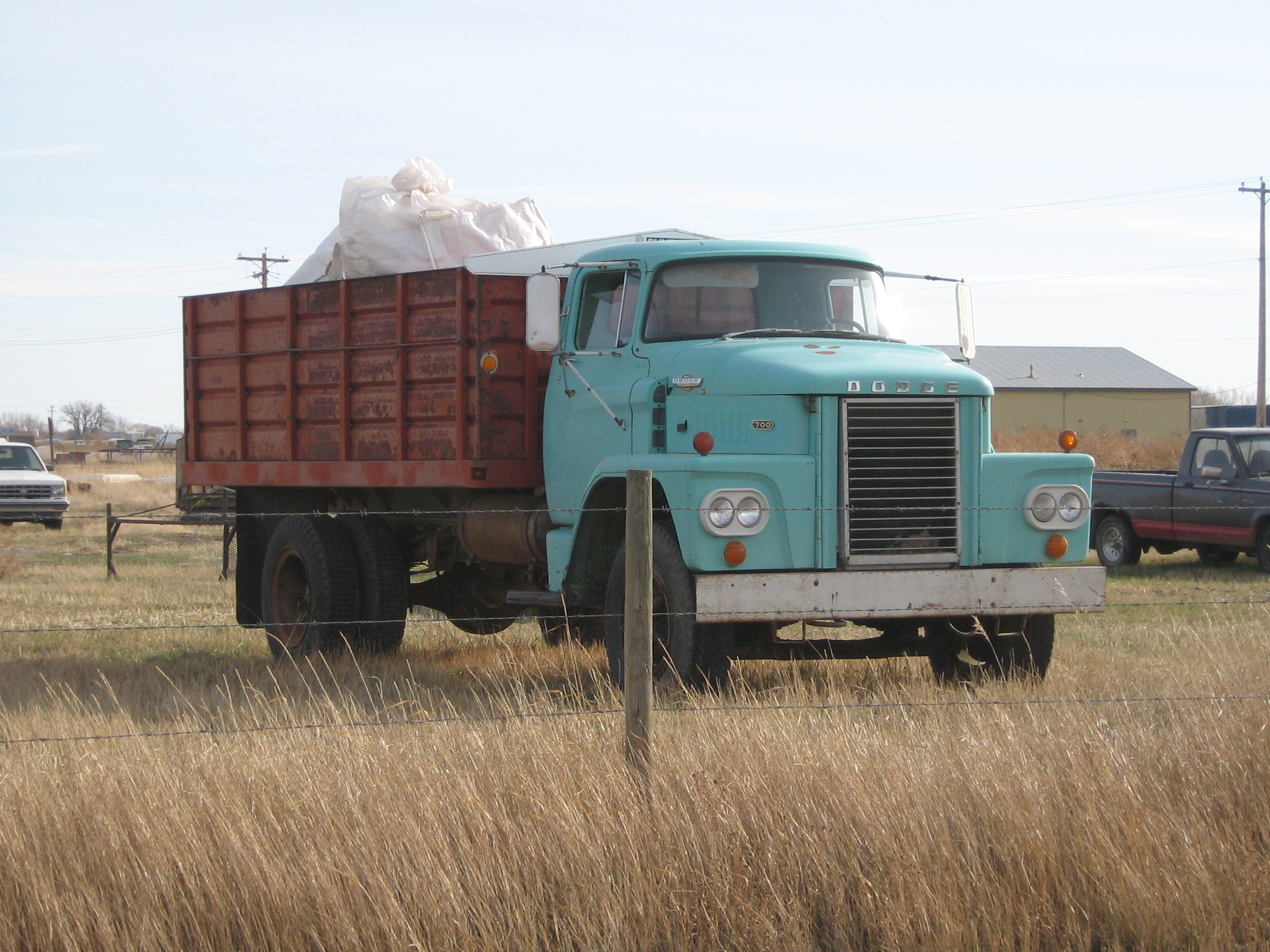
Dodge C-500 grain truck, with quad headlights

The LCF cabin section was taken directly from the 1956–1960 range of Dodge pickup trucks, with its panoramic windshield, but was fitted with a unique front section. One of the Dodge LCF's main selling points was accessibility; the sides of the engine compartment and fenders being arranged to swing open. A mechanic could easily stand between the engine and the front wheel while working. Chrysler Corporation outsourced production of the cab body to Checker Motors Corp. Assembly took place on Checker line 2 in Kalamazoo, Michigan.

A range of Dodge and International Harvester gasoline engines were available, as were diesels from Perkins (for lighter variants), Cummins, Caterpillar, and Detroit Diesel for the heaviest duty versions, both six-cylinder and V8 versions. Gasoline-powered versions were simply called the "C" series, followed by a numeral indicating weight class, and all of them were V8-powered. Perkins diesel-engined units were called "PC", while inline diesels were called "CN" and V-type diesels were "CV". A "T" following the letters indicates a tandem rear axle. On LCFs equipped with inline-six diesels the engine intruded into the cabin. This was covered with a removable panel for maintenance. A near unlimited range of engines, transmissions, and rear axles were available for what was usually a built-to-order truck. The biggest diesel available was the Cummins V-903, a giant 903 cu in (14,794 cc) unit with a modest 289 hp (216 kW) max output. The smaller 567 cu in (9,299 cc) Detroit Diesel 8V-71N was the most powerful engine, with 300 hp (224 kW) on tap.

With Dodge pulling out of the heavy truck business, the C series' last year in the US market was 1975. A few hundred more CNT800s and CNT900s were exported in 1976 as CKD kits to Latin American countries, where the last units were assembled until 1978.
