= Dodge B series =

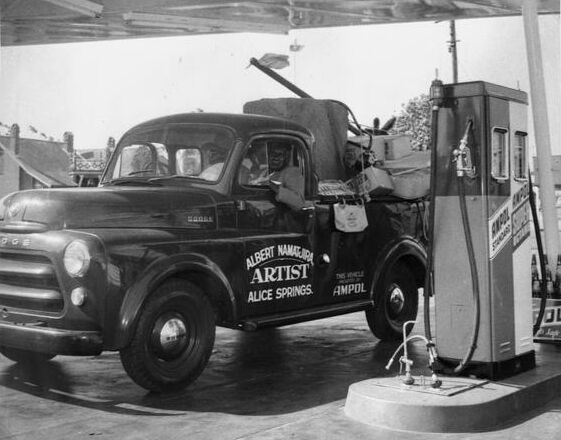
- Dodge B series, with a C-series grille

Overview
- Manufacturer: Dodge (Chrysler)
- Model years: 1948–1953
- Assembly: United States: Los Angeles, California (Los Angeles Assembly); Stockton, California; Warren, Michigan (Warren Truck Assembly)

Body and chassis
- Class: Full-size pickup truck
- Body style: 2-door pickup truck
- Layout: FR layout

Powertrain
- Transmission: 3-speed manual

Dimensions
- Wheelbase: 108 in (2,743 mm) (6.5' bed); 116 in (2,946 mm) (7.5' bed); 126 in (3,200 mm) (9' bed)

Chronology
- Predecessor: Dodge T-, V-, W-Series
- Successor: Dodge C Series

Dodge has used the B series name on two different vehicles, a pickup truck and a van.

== Pickup truck ==
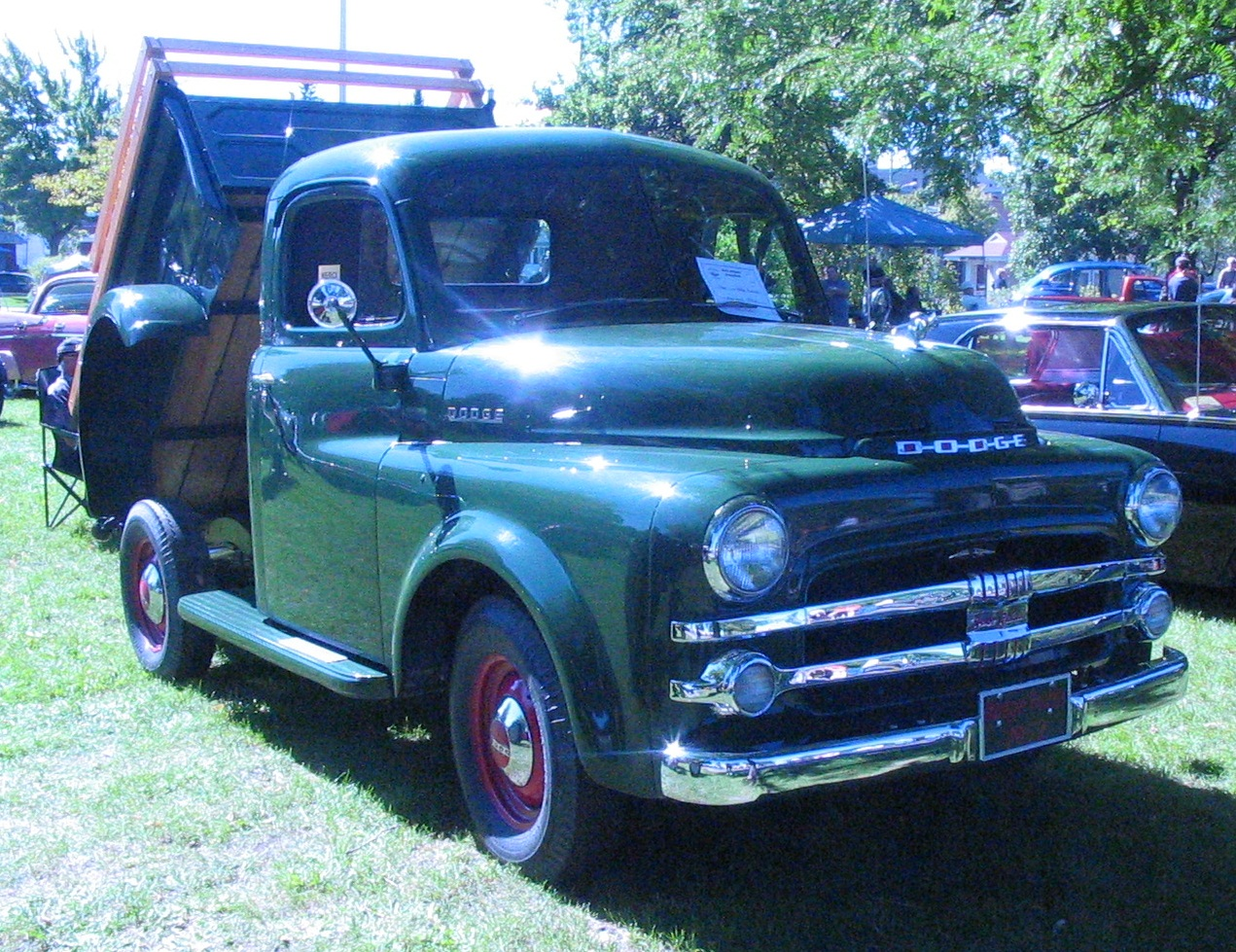
1952 Dodge B series

The B-series pickup trucks were sold from 1948 to 1953. They replaced the prewar Dodge truck and were replaced by the Dodge C series in 1954. The B-series trucks came in several different variants. The B1-B were ½-ton trucks standard with a 95 hp (71 kW) flathead-straight-six engine while the B1-C were ¾-ton trucks with a standard 108 hp (81 kW) flathead-straight 6 engine. It also came in several other variants such as the B1-T and B1-V which were semi-truck cabs and vans, respectively. A woodie version, the "Suburban", was also available from outside companies.

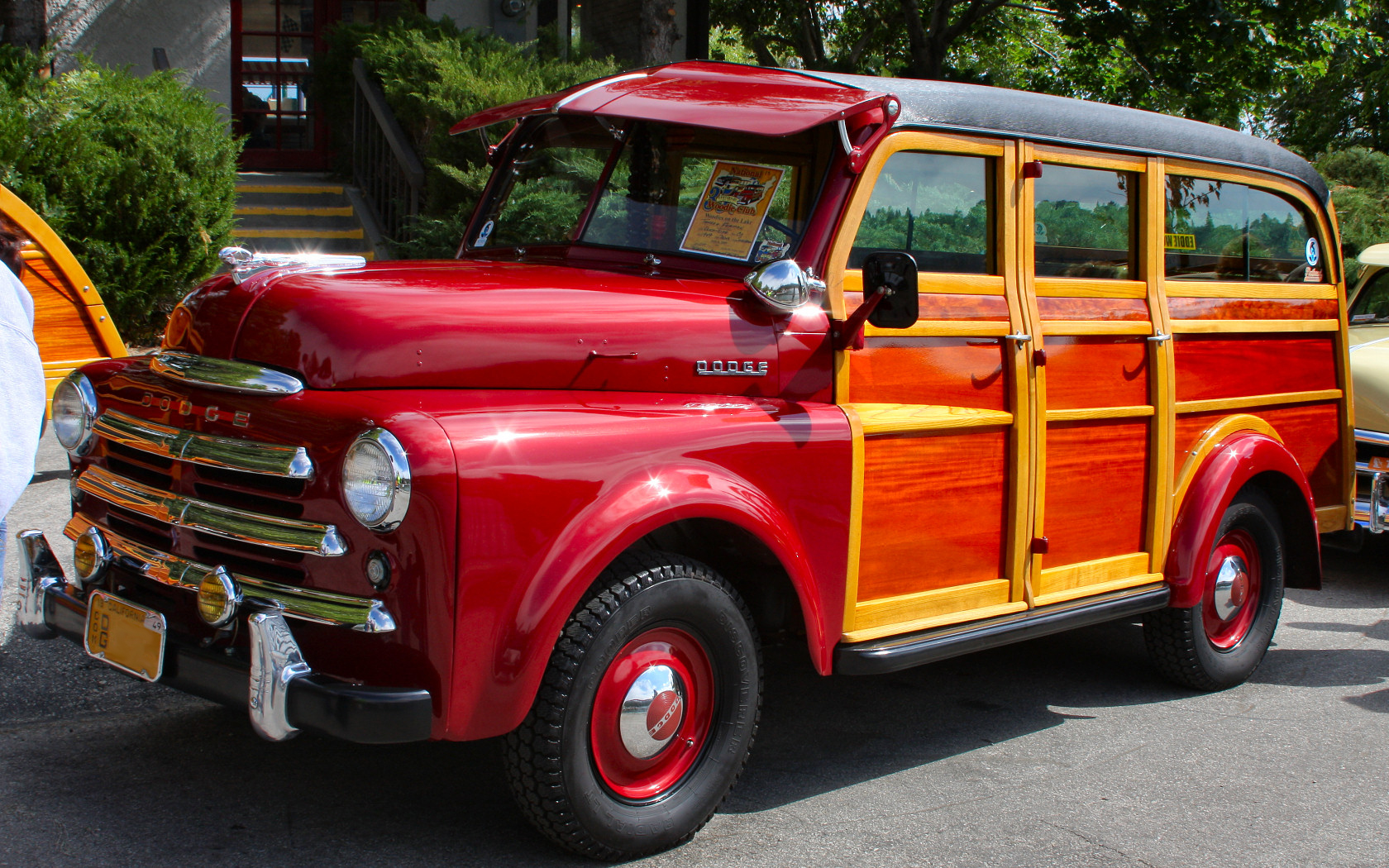
1949 Dodge B-series woodie carryall

The B-series trucks featured a high-visibility "pilot-house" cab with optional rear quarter windows. The engine was shifted forward and the front axle moved back on the frame for better weight distribution as well as a shorter wheelbase, moving from 116 in (2,900 mm) to 108 in (2,700 mm) on ½-ton models. The cargo bed sides were made higher to increase capacity by 40%. The redesigned cab could seat three people, with 2.5 in (64 mm) more height, 6 in (152 mm) more width and 3 in (76 mm) additional in length. The cab was mounted on rubber mounts for an improved ride. Another innovation for the time was the use of cross-steering arrangement, giving the trucks a 37° turning radius. The cargo box space was increased over previous models and overload springs made optional on all variants to increase hauling capacity. In 1950 the trucks, now named B2 (B2-B, B2-C, B2-D), gained more new features while the 3-speed manual shift lever was relocated to the steering column instead of on the floor. A fluid drive standard transmission, with 3 or 4 speeds, became an available option. The front end and dashboard/gauge layout were redesigned for 1951, now in the B3 iteration.

1953 was the last year of the "pilot-house" trucks, now named B4, but brought many new changes. The Truck-O-Matic transmission, a fully automatic transmission was available for ½ and ¾-ton models. The longer 7.5 ft (2.3 m) bed previously only available on ¾-tons became available on ½-tons as well, which would increase the wheelbase to 116 in (2,946 mm). New, longer rear fenders were added, which would continue to be used by Dodge through 1985.

== Van ==
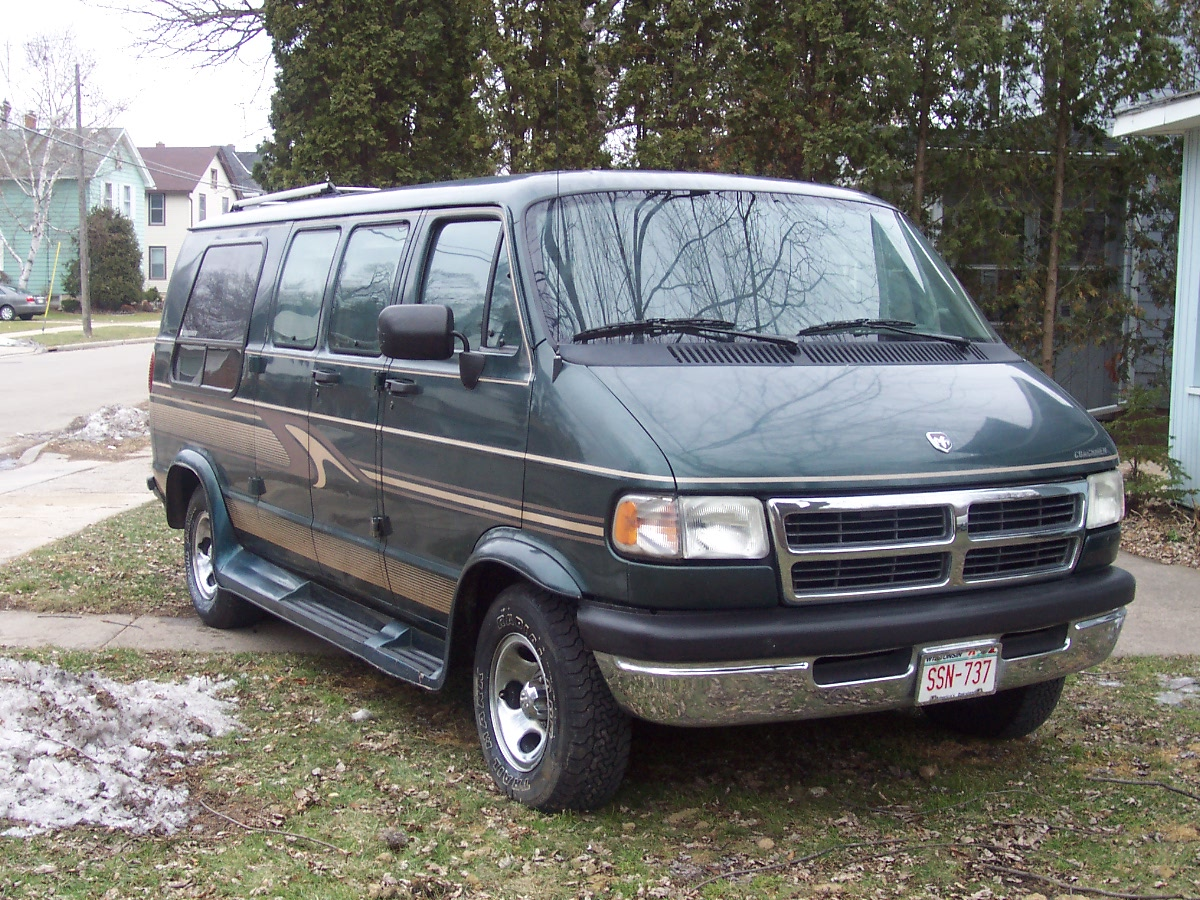
1996 Dodge Ram Van Wagon

The B series also includes full-sized vans made by the Dodge division of Chrysler Corporation from 1970 (as early 1971 models) through 2003. During that time, they were originally numbered B100, B200, and B300; the numbers were later upped by 50 (B150, etc.) and finally multiplied by 10 (B1500, B2500, B3500) in the mid-1990s. The actual names were Dodge Sportsman, Dodge Tradesman, Dodge Van, at first; they later changed to Ram Van, Ram Wagon, and, briefly. There was also a Kary Van extended height model.

The cargo and passenger vans used the same frame and powerplants (both 6- and V8 engines), but the passenger vans had seats for up to 15 passengers (on the extended length, long-wheelbase Maxivans), dual air-conditioning systems (in later years), and large windows on both sides. The 15-passenger vans are today commonly used by military, commuters, church groups, scouts, urban camping, and some corporations. Throughout their run, two wheelbases were used: 109 in (2,769 mm) and 127 in (3,226 mm), with an extended-length version based on the longer wheelbase. Engines ranged from the 198 in³ Slant Six (available only in 1970–71), to the 440 in³ V8 (only briefly available in the late 1970s), with factory compressed-natural-gas 318 in³ (5.2 L) engines available from around 1995 onwards, to fleet buyers only. A popular Kary Van (basically a factory-built cube van, instead of upfitted by an aftermarket company), which extended the cargo area height to 6 ft 2 in (1.88 m), was added in 1972. A sliding door was made optional in 1974; that same year, the original stamped aluminum grille was also replaced with a molded plastic part. A one-piece rear door and hard-service interior were made optional in 1975.

For many years, Dodge was the sales leader for vans, including conversions for tradespeople, ambulances, school buses, and campers, working with numerous upfitters to provide alternatives for customers. However, in 1979, the RV market crashed, and Dodge stopped making RV chassis; their van sales also dropped roughly in half. After that, upgrades to the "B-vans" came more slowly, especially as the vans' utility was in some ways duplicated by the company's own popular Plymouth Voyager and Dodge Caravan minivans.

In 1988, a 239 in³ (3.9 L) V6 originally developed for the Dodge Dakota mid-size pickup replaced the 225 in³ (3.7 L) Slant Six, and throttle body injection was given to the 318 V8. The 360 in³ (5.9 L) V8 gaining fuel injection and a roller camshaft in 1989. In 1990, rear wheel antilock brakes were made optional, along with a heavy-duty four-speed automatic transmission.

In 1992, the V6 and 5.2L V8 engines were fitted with sequential multiple-port fuel injection (SMPI) and a "barrel" / "kegger"-type intake manifold, which boosted power dramatically, and the outboard positions of the rear seat gained three-point belts. In the same year, compressed natural gas 5.2 L engines became optional for fleet buyers. The 5.9 L received the new intake and SMPI for 1993.

Numerous changes to the drivetrain, body, and suspension were made after 1993, as Dodge tried to make the vans more competitive, leading to a fairly sizeable redesign in 1998, which added numerous features, made the vans more driveable and safer, and added power to the 5.9 L V8 engine. More, and also substantial, changes were made for the 2000 model year, but little was changed from then until the final vans. Dodge stopped making the vans in June 2003, citing the expense of meeting future safety standards and slow sales. The Pillette Road plant in Windsor, Ontario which made the vans was closed down and later demolished.
