= Dodge A100 =

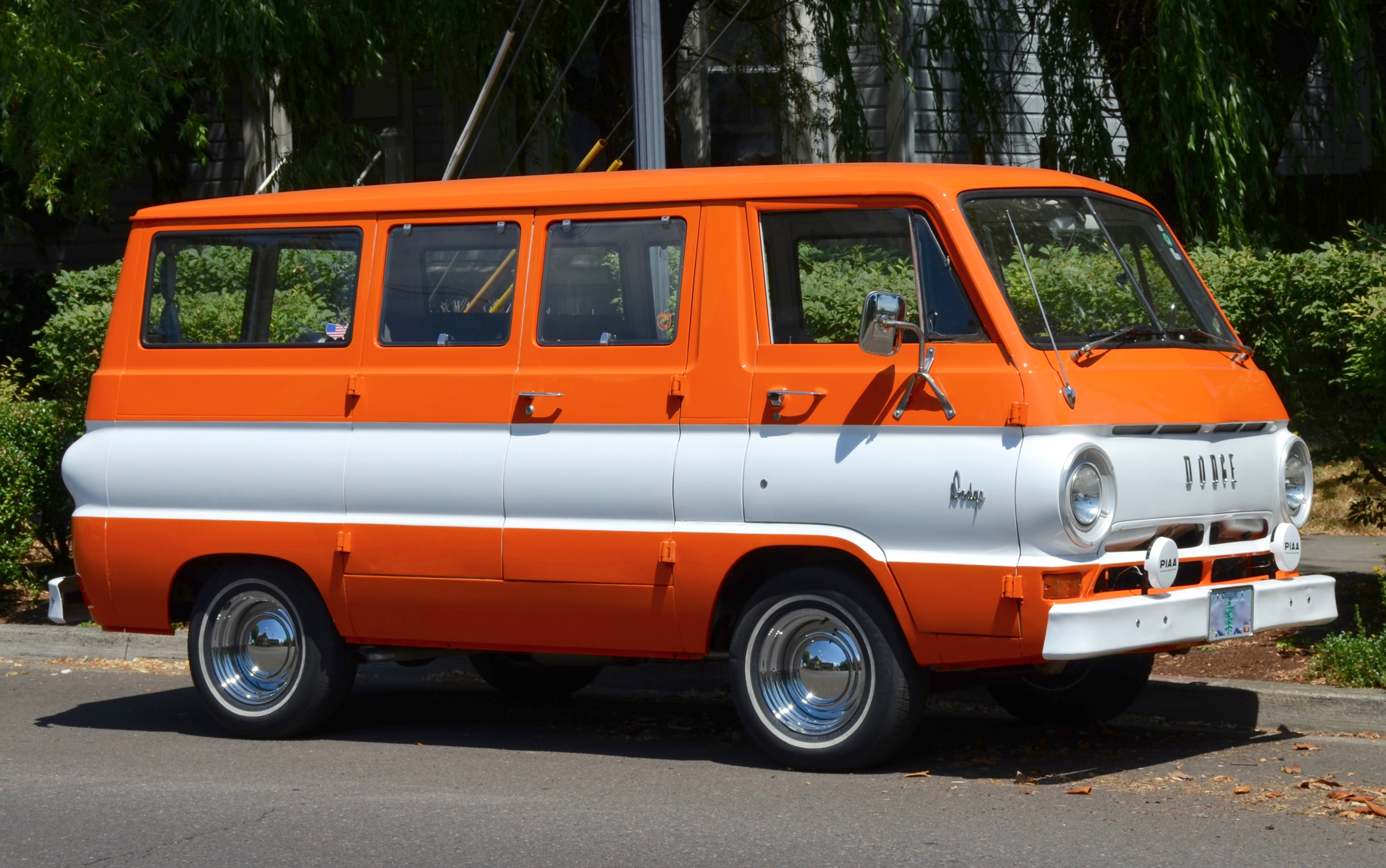
- Dodge A100 Sportsman

Overview
- Manufacturer: Dodge (Chrysler)
- Also called: Fargo A100 (Canada)
- Production: 1964–1970
- Assembly: Warren, Michigan, United States (Warren Truck Assembly)

Body and chassis
- Class: Compact truck Compact van
- Body style: 2-door pickup truck 2-door van
- Layout: FMR layout
- Platform: Chrysler A platform

Powertrain
- Engine: 170 cu in (2.8 L) Slant-6 I6; 225 cu in (3.7 L) Slant-6 I6; 273 cu in (4.5 L) LA V8; 318 cu in (5.2 L) LA V8
- Transmission: 3-speed manual 3-speed automatic

Dimensions
- Wheelbase: SWB: 90.0 in (2,286 mm); LWB: 108.0 in (2,743 mm)
- Length: 171.0 in (4,343 mm)
- Width: 78.6 in (1,996 mm)

Chronology
- Predecessor: Dodge Town Panel
- Successor: Dodge B-series

The A100 is a range of compact vans and trucks manufactured and marketed from 1964 to 1970 by Chrysler Corporation under the Dodge marque in the United States and the Fargo marque in Canada.

The A100 competed with the Ford Econoline, Chevrolet Van, Chevy Corvair Greenbrier, and the Volkswagen Type 2. The range included a pickup truck and van, both with a "forward control" design. Placing the driver on top of the front axle with the engine between the front seats, just behind the front wheels makes it a "cab over" vehicle. The unibody vehicles used a short 90 in (2,286 mm) wheelbase. An A108 was also available from 1967 to 1970, with a longer 108 in (2,743 mm) wheelbase. The A108 was popular with camper conversion companies. A substantially modified, Hemi-powered A100 wheelstanding exhibition pickup called the "Little Red Wagon", driven by Bill "Maverick" Golden, was a popular drag strip attraction from the 1960s to the early 2000s.

The A100 was replaced for 1970 by the larger B-series, which was only available as a van and did not include a pickup truck variant.

== Engines ==
- 1964–1966 170 in^{3} (2.8 L) Slant-6 I6, 101 hp (75 kW)
- 1970 198 in^{3} (3.2 L) Slant-6 I6, 125 hp (93 kW)
- 1964–1970 225 in^{3} (3.7 L) Slant-6 I6, 145 hp (108 kW)
- 1965–1966 273 in^{3} (4.5 L) LA V8
- 1967–1970 318 in^{3} (5.2 L) LA V8, 210 hp (160 kW)

== L-Series trucks ==
From 1966 to 1971, Dodge built L-Series medium-duty cabover engine trucks with a tilting forward-control cab based on the forward body of the A-100.

The cab was also used in Villaverde, Spain to build the Barreiros 42/45 and 42/55 trucks after 1969. The Spanish trucks relied on a locally built inline-four diesel engine.

== In popular culture ==
The Dodge A100 was featured in the American television series That '70s Show episode "Red's Last Day", as Michael Kelso's new van. It also appeared in the movie Cars as the character Dusty Rust-eze, in the remake of The Texas Chainsaw Massacre, as well as the comedy Stealing Harvard. An A100 appeared in many different colors in the 1960s Batman TV series. More often than not, it was the preferred getaway vehicle of each episode's villain.

The Dodge Little Red Wagon was a famous exhibition drag racing truck introduced in 1965 based on the A100 pickup.

== Gallery ==
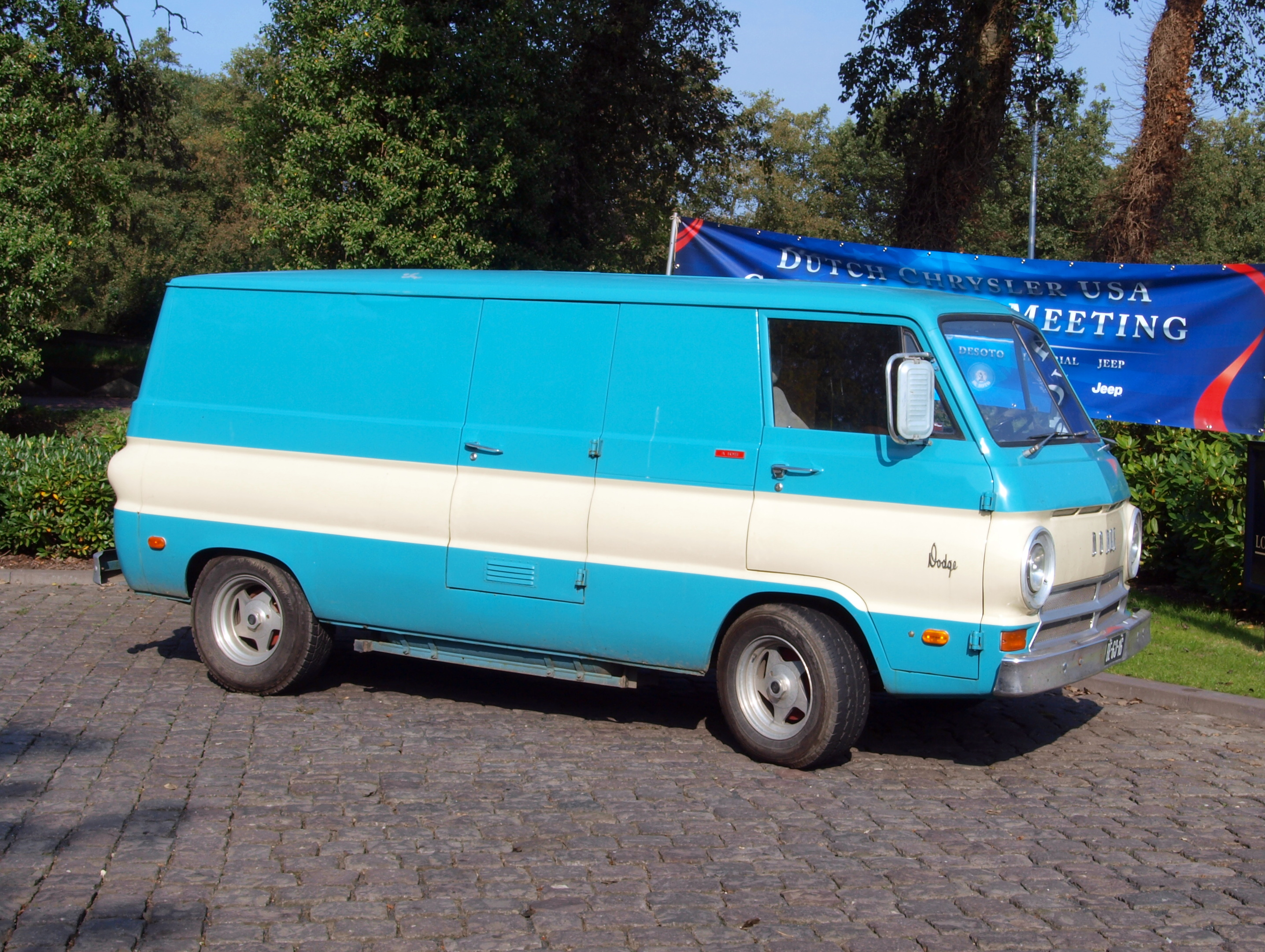
1970 Dodge A108 (LWB) van

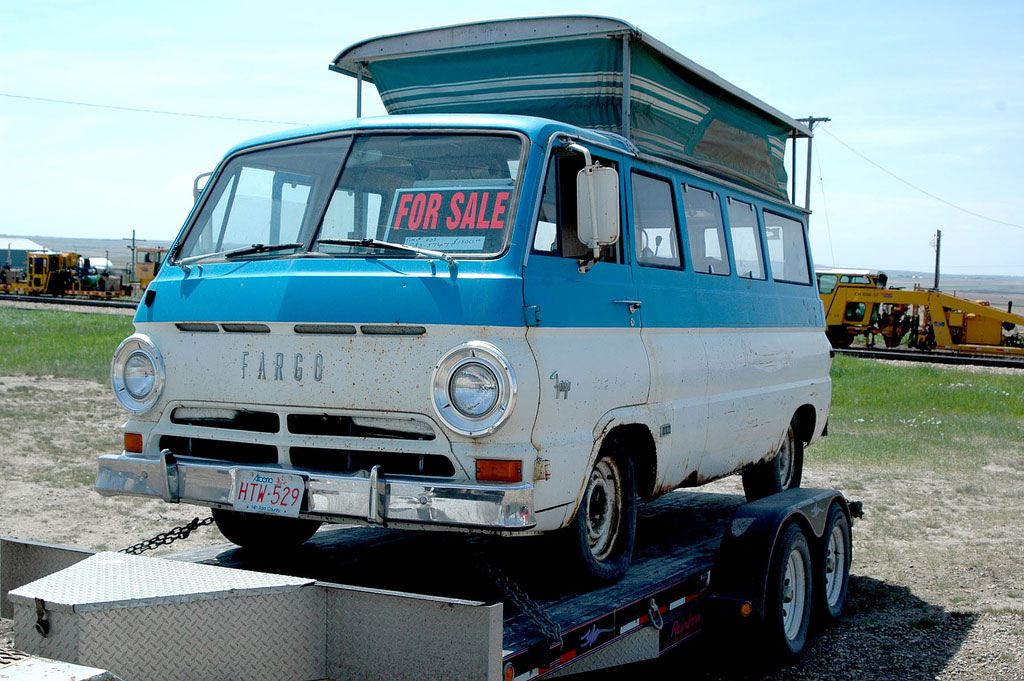
A Canadian Fargo camper conversion on the longer, 108-inch wheelbase

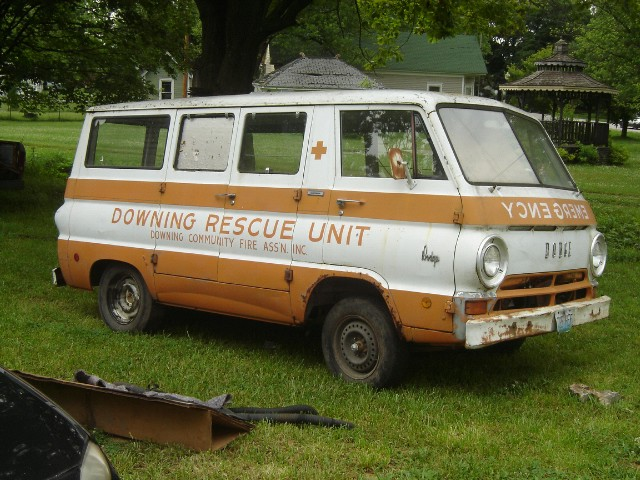
An A100 modified as an emergency vehicle

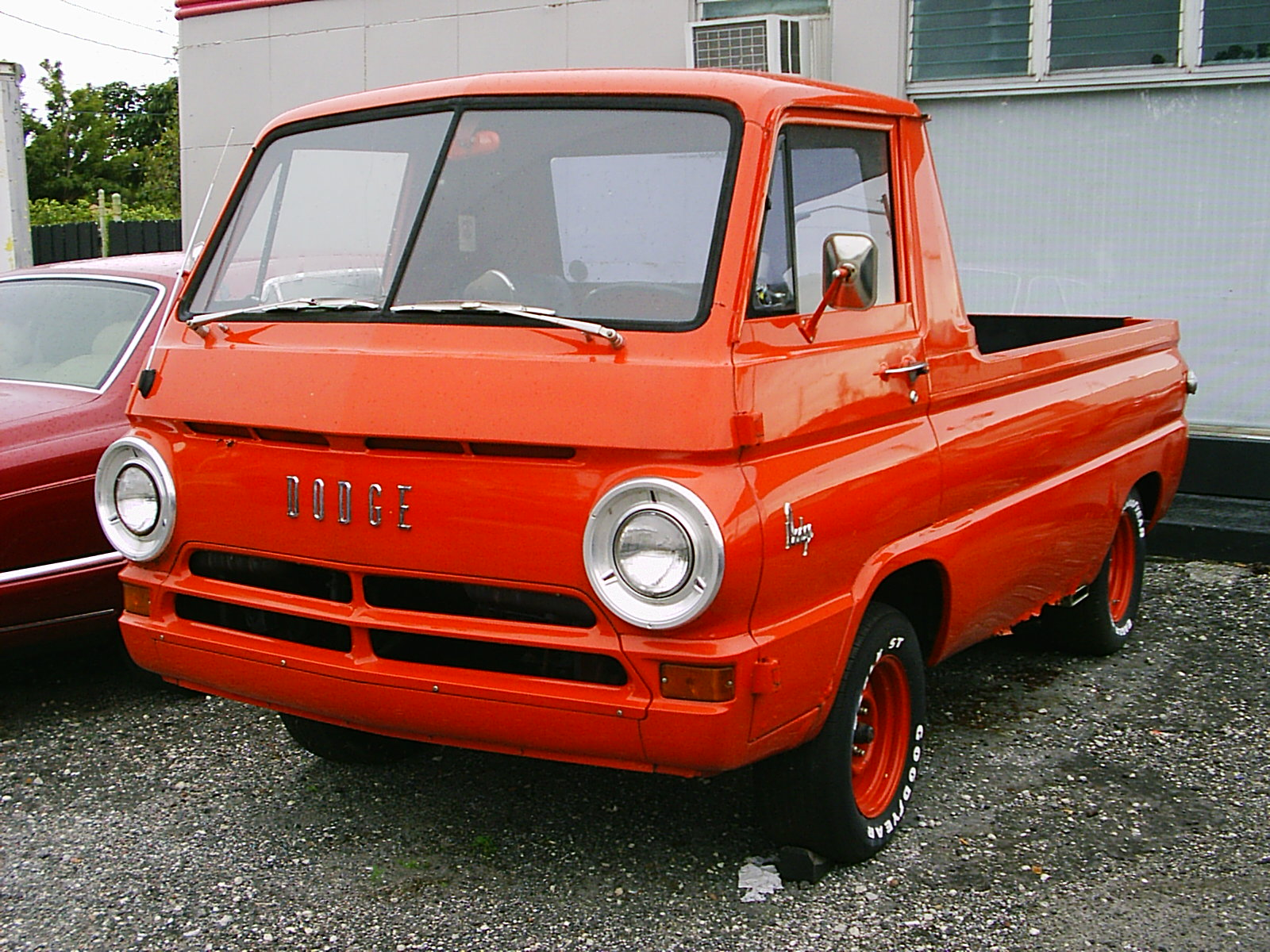
Dodge A100 Pickup

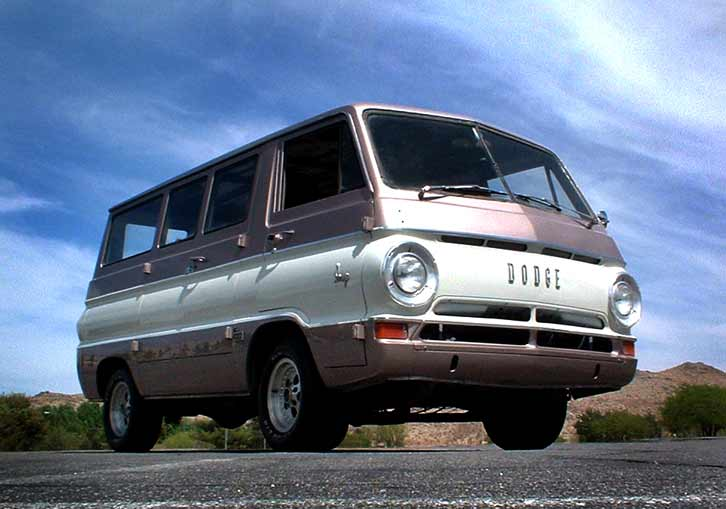
A100 Custom Sportsman
