= Panel truck =

Van based on the chassis of a pickup truck

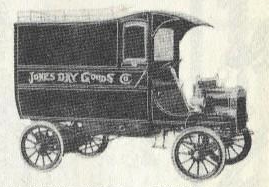
1906 Kansas City Motors panel truck

A panel truck (also called a panel delivery or pickup truck-based van) in U.S. and Canadian usage is a small delivery truck with a fully enclosed body. It typically is high and has no rear windows in the rear cargo area. The term was first used in the early 1910s. Panel trucks were marketed for contracting, deliveries, and other businesses. Often described as a small van (based on the chassis of a truck or pickup truck) used mostly for delivery rounds, the British equivalent is a "delivery van."

== History ==
Consumer demand from farmers and businesses for stripped-down Model T versions prompted Henry Ford to market vehicles that independent builders could supply cabs and cargo enclosures according to users' needs.

During World War I the U.S. Army ordered 20,000 Dodge half-ton chassis sets for use as cargo trucks and ambulances that were then marketed after the war as the "Screenside Commercial Car"—a pickup with a roof and roll-up side covers or a fully enclosed cargo-bed.

Chevrolet made a van-like version of their Chevrolet Suburban, which was a station wagon version of the Chevrolet pickup truck from the 1930s. Panel truck versions of the Suburban were made until 1973.

Ford made panel truck versions of their pickup trucks until 1960. Panel trucks were also converted into canopy expresses, which were primarily used by farmers.

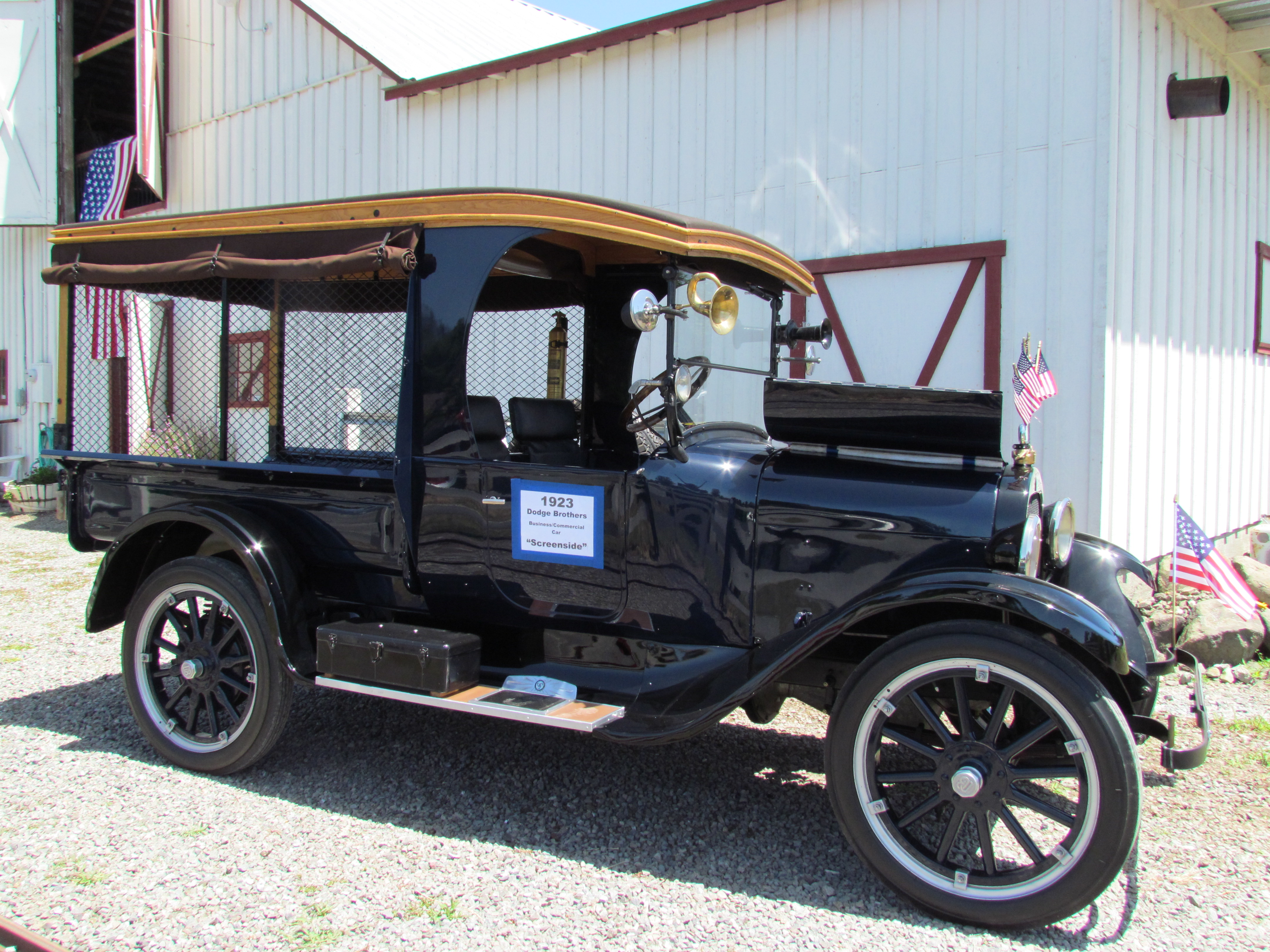
1923 Dodge Brothers Screenside (canopy) truck

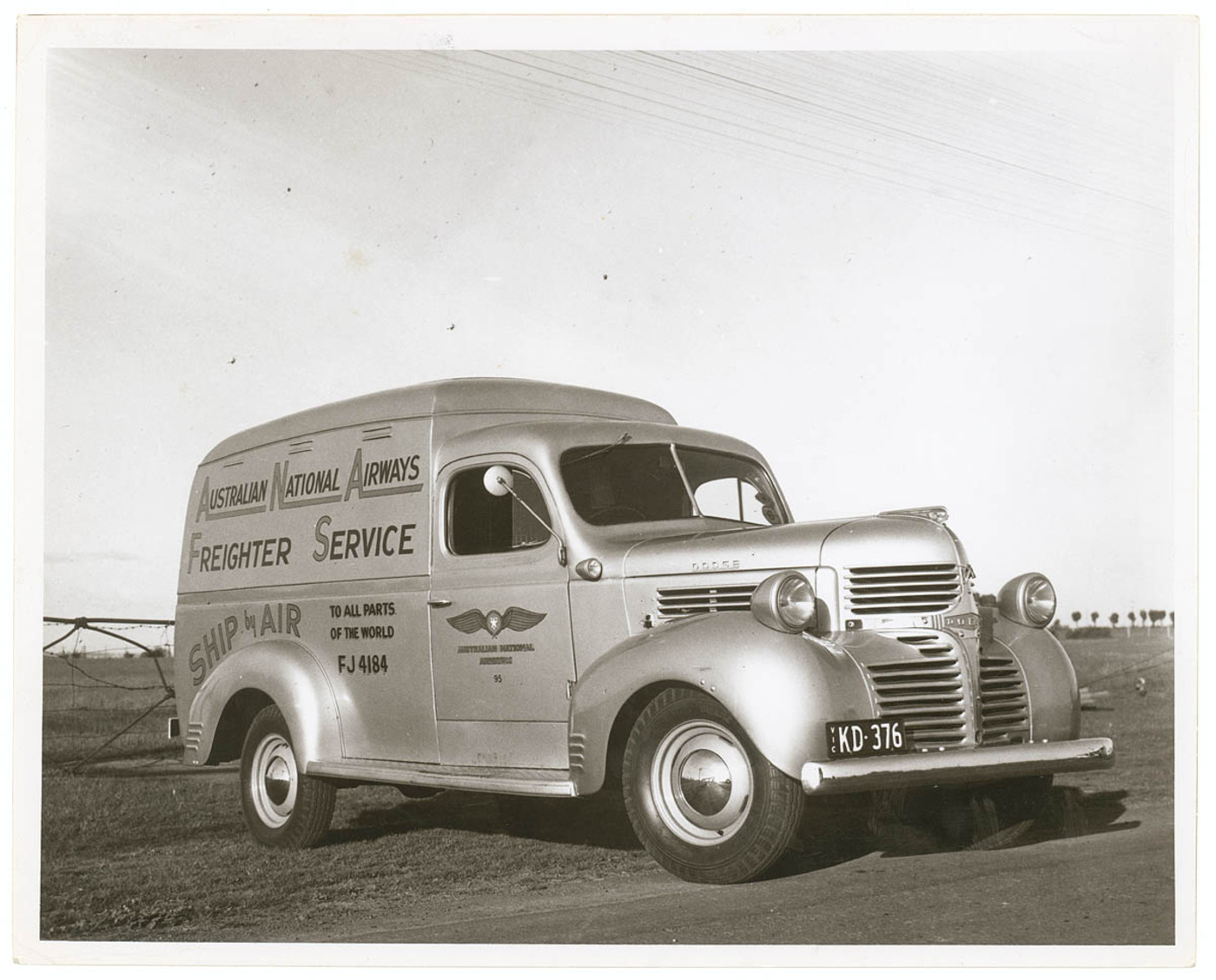
1940s Dodge panel truck

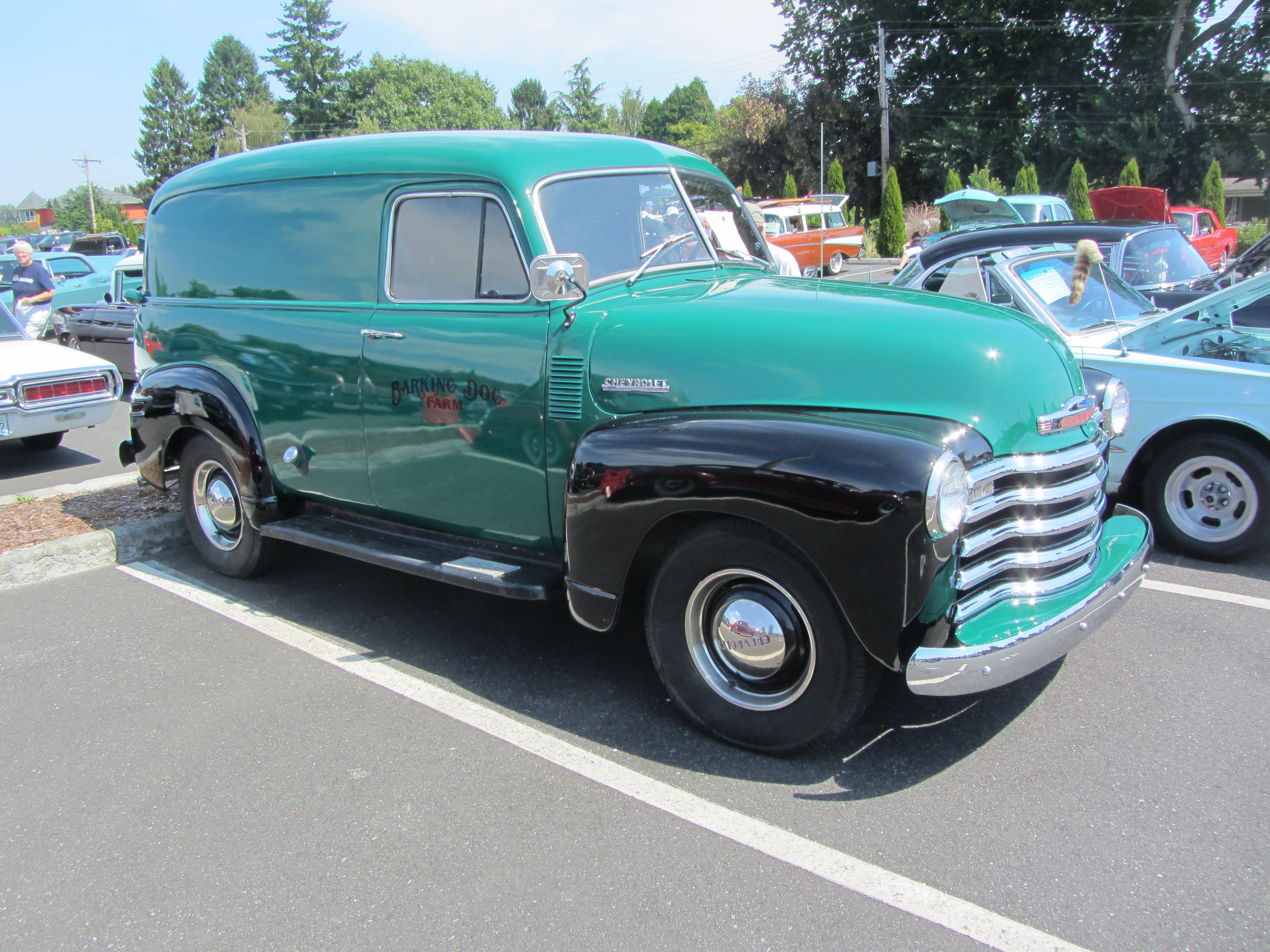
Chevrolet Advance Design panel truck

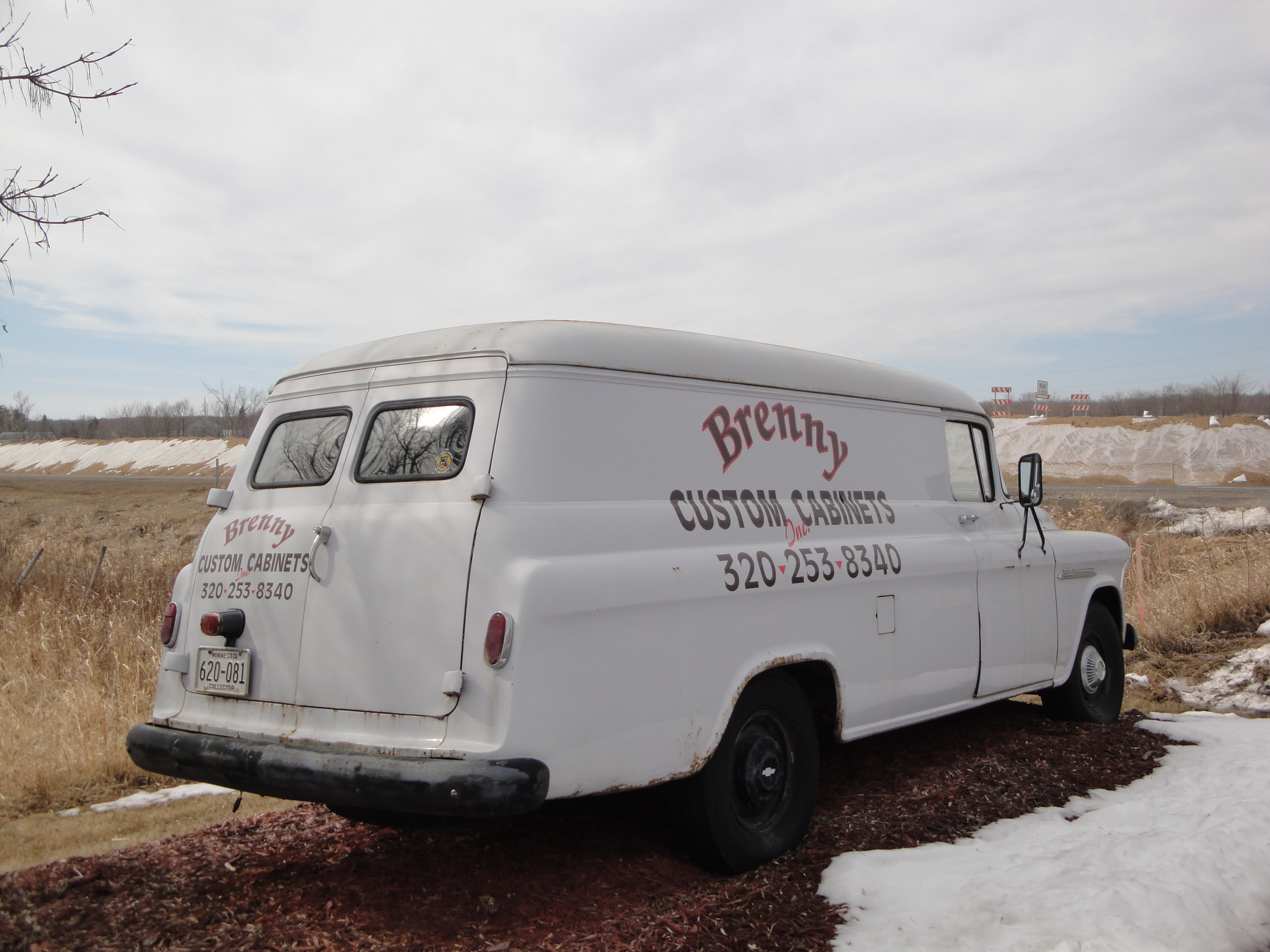
1955 Chevrolet 3800 Panel Truck

The style of the panel trucks from the 1930s to 1950s inspired the style of both the Chrysler PT Cruiser and the Chevrolet HHR. However, both of these were car platform-based models (Chrysler PL and GM Delta platforms respectively), not built on a pickup truck chassis.

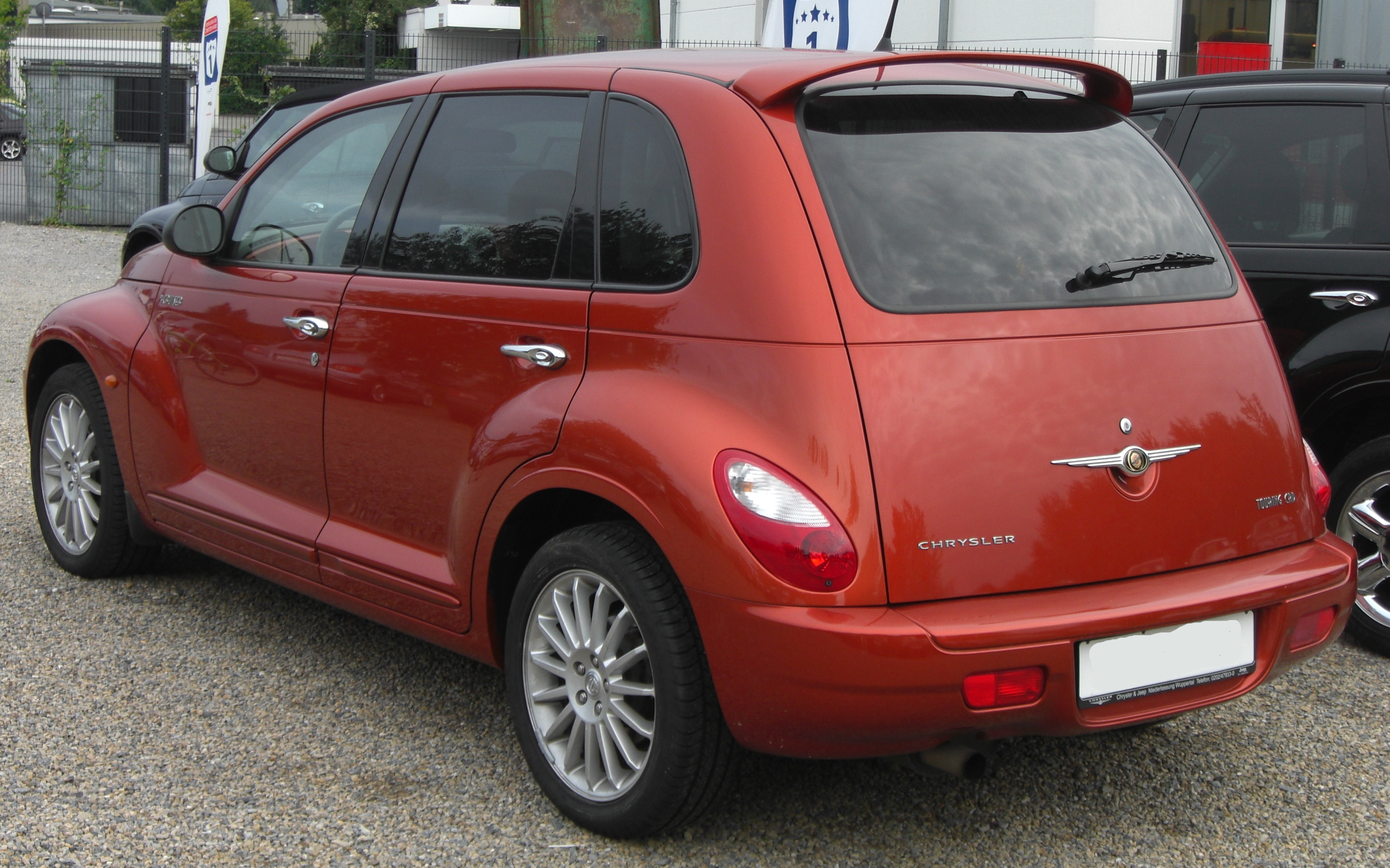
Chrysler PT-Cruiser

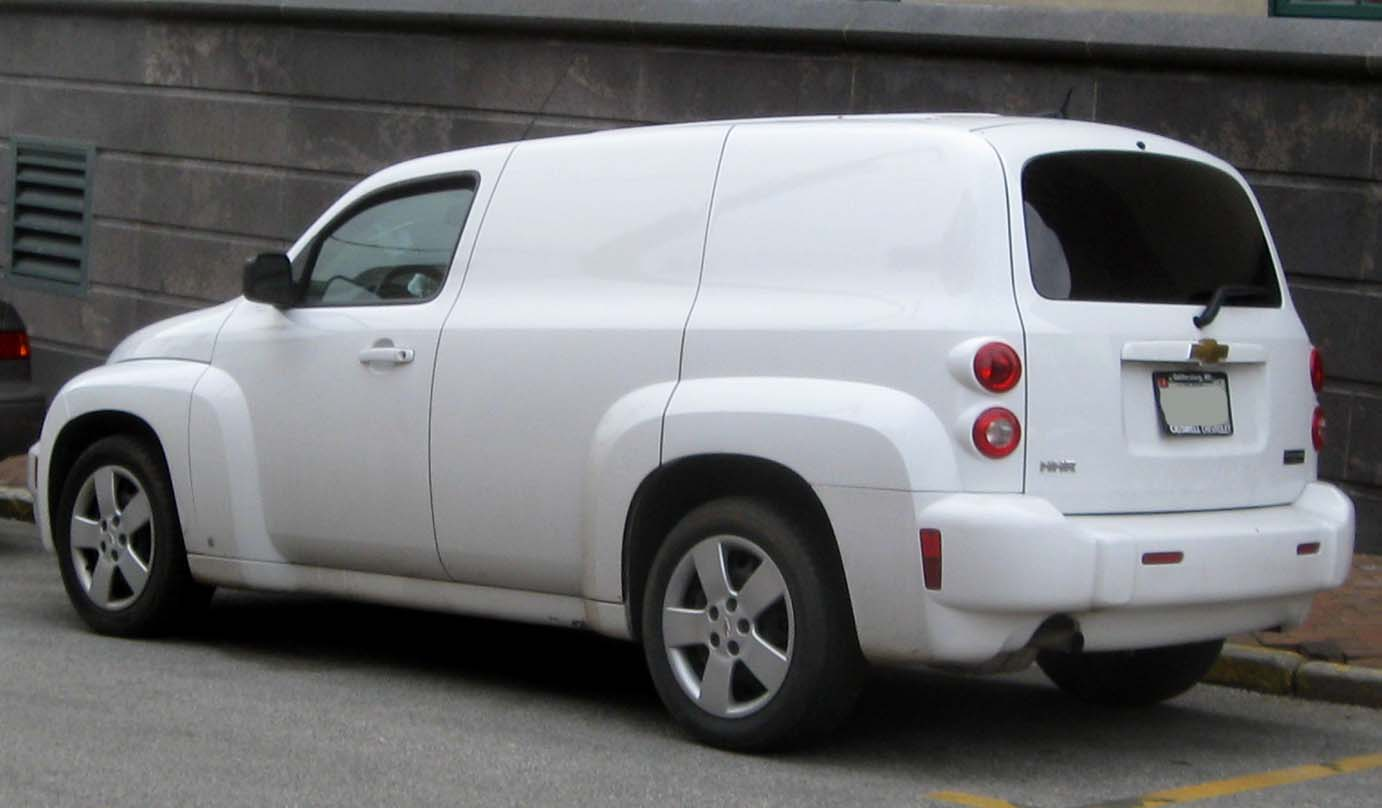
Chevrolet HHR panel

The current use of panel trucks describes commercial delivery vans.

== Difference ==
The difference between a sedan delivery and a panel truck is that the sedan delivery is based on the chassis of a sedan, hatchback, or station wagon, while a panel truck is based on the chassis of a pickup truck. Unibody-based vans are similar in size and in functionality but have a unibody chassis.

== Canopy express ==
A canopy express (also known as a "huckster truck") is a light-duty cargo van based on the chassis of a panel truck. Canopy express vehicles have open display areas behind the driver's seat commonly used for peddling vegetables and fruit, but also used for other kinds of deliveries that require easy access, such as newspapers and radio equipment.

Canopy express trucks evolved as a more stylized version of standard pickup trucks that contained open canopies installed over the pickup bed. They were built by Dodge, General Motors, and International Harvester as well as other manufacturers. Ford Canopy Express trucks were merely aftermarket conversions of their existing panel trucks.

As the United States became more suburbanized after World War II, sales of canopy express vehicles declined. Dodge ceased production of these trucks in 1948, while GM offered the last of them in 1955.

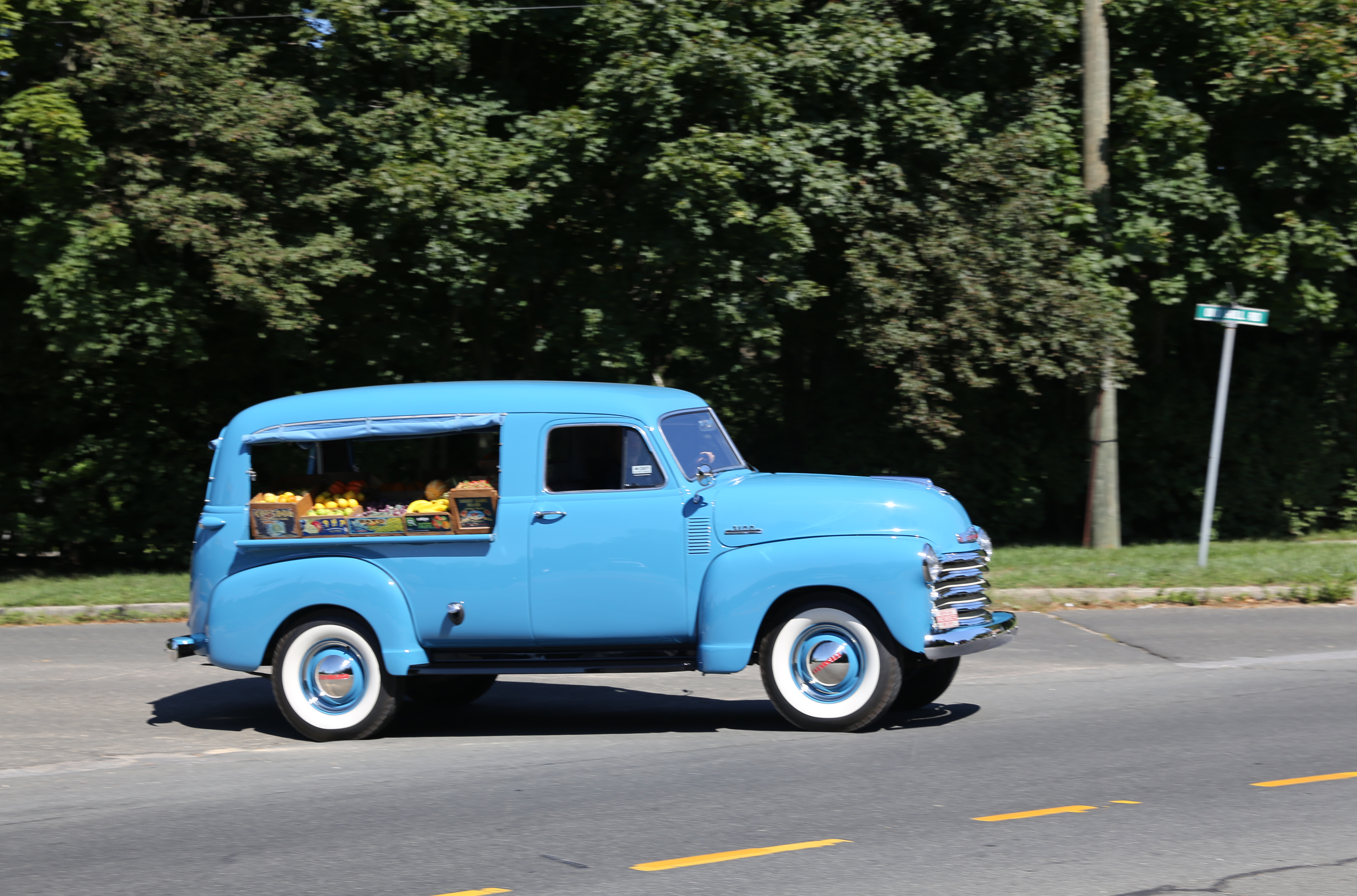
1953 Chevrolet 3100 canopy express

== See also ==
- Carryall
- Multi-stop truck
- Panel van
- Pickup truck
