= Dodge Ramcharger =

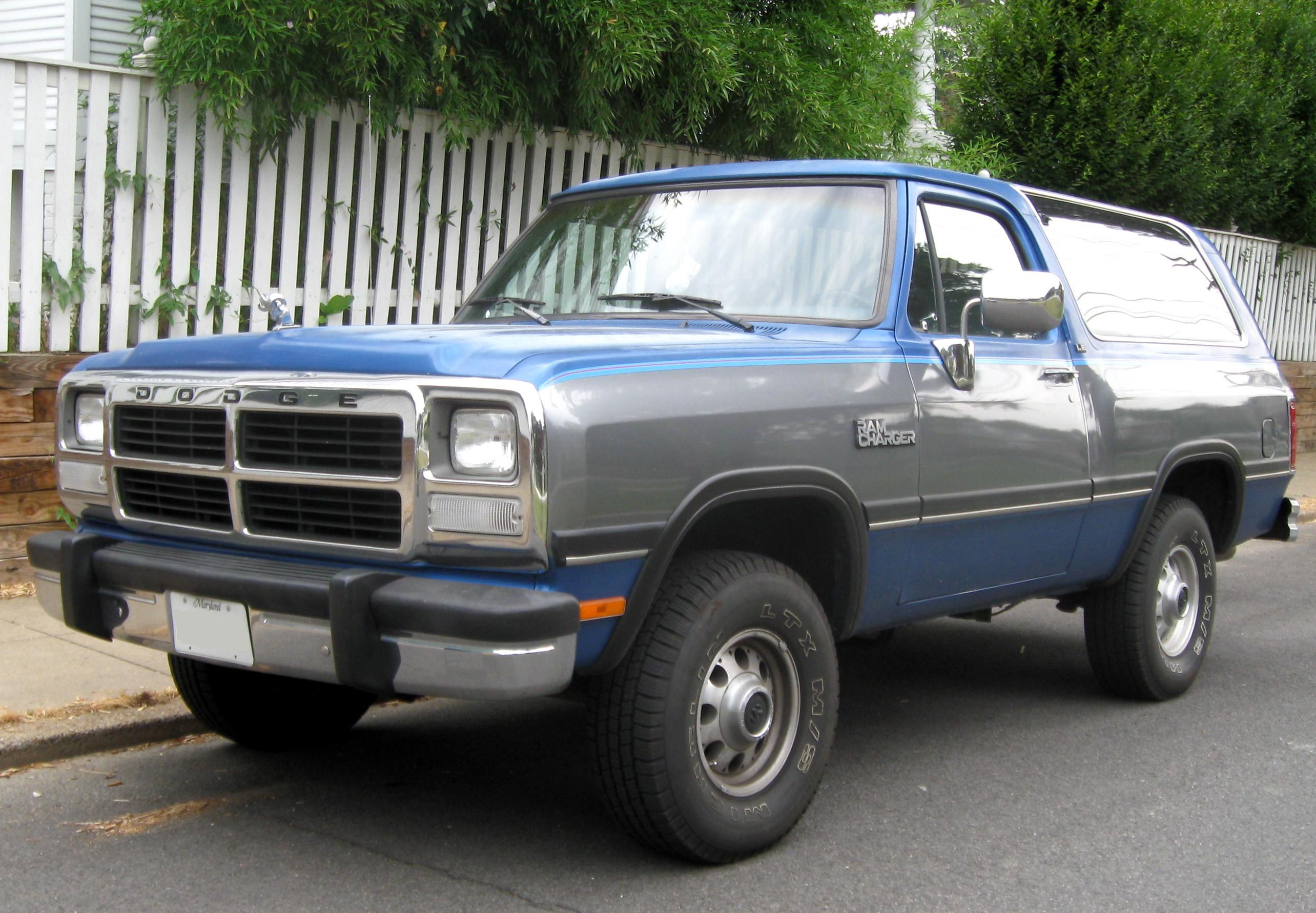

Overview
- Manufacturer: Chrysler Corporation (1974–1996); DaimlerChrysler (1999–2001)
- Also called: Plymouth Trail Duster
- Production: 1974–2001
- Assembly: Warren, Michigan, United States (Warren Truck Assembly)

Body and chassis
- Class: Full-size SUV
- Body style: 2-door SUV
- Platform: Front engine, rear-wheel drive / four-wheel drive

Chronology
- Predecessor: Dodge Town Wagon
- Successor: Dodge Durango

The Dodge Ramcharger is a large sport utility vehicle built by Dodge from 1974 to 1993, based on a shortened-wheelbase version of the Dodge D series/Ram pickup chassis. A Plymouth version, named the Plymouth Trail Duster, offered from 1974 to 1981, was Plymouth's only SUV.

The Ramcharger was mostly produced as a two-door, 4×4 vehicle, although a two-wheel-drive version was available. As a full-size SUV, it competed with the Chevrolet K5 Blazer and the 1978–1996 Ford Bronco.

The Ramcharger was discontinued at the end of the 1993 model year in North America. In Mexico, however, production continued until 1996. It was then brought back from 1999 to 2001, still as a two-door SUV and sharing the design of the contemporary Ram pickup. Approximately 30,000 were produced, with all examples being two-wheel-drive only.

In November 2023, Stellantis announced that the Ramcharger nameplate would be revived for a plug-in hybrid and extended-range electric vehicle truck version of the 2025 Ram 1500.

== First generation (1974–1980) ==
First generation
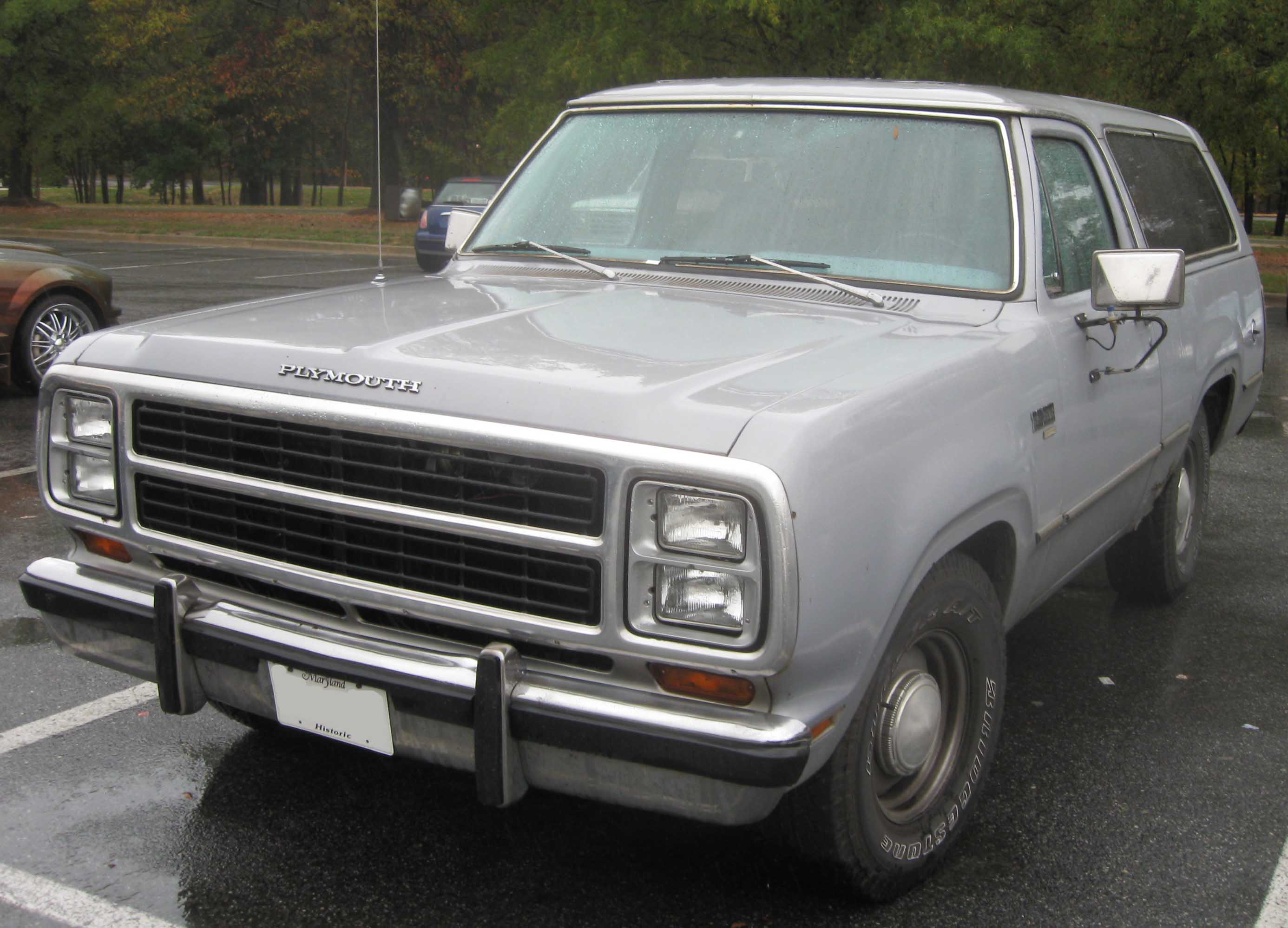
- 1977-1980 Plymouth Trail Duster

Overview
- Also called: Plymouth Trail Duster (1974–1981)
- Production: 1974–1980

Body and chassis
- Platform: Chrysler AD platform
- Related: Dodge D Series; Dodge Ram

Powertrain
- Engine: 225 cu in (3.7 L) I6; 318 cu in (5.2 L) V8; 360 cu in (5.9 L) V8; 400 cu in (6.6 L) V8; 440 cu in (7.2 L) V8
- Transmission: 4-speed manual 3-speed TorqueFlite automatic

During development, it was known as the "Rhino." The Ramcharger/Trail Duster were built using a version of the Dodge Ram's Chrysler AD platform with a 9 inches (230 mm) shorter wheelbase. Originally available in four-wheel-drive exclusively, a rear-wheel-drive only version was available starting in 1975. The 1974 through 1980 models came without a roof, with a dealer-installed fabric top, or an optional removable steel roof with a flip-up rear tailgate window. The early 1974 year model differs from the others in that its door pillars are attached to the removable roof. The "half doors" were used up to the build date of June 10, 1974; afterwards, the roof was changed to use normal pickup-style doors. Marketed as a basic utility vehicle, only the driver's seat was standard equipment with the passenger seat optional up to 1976. Also available was an insulated center console for keeping items cool when filled with ice.

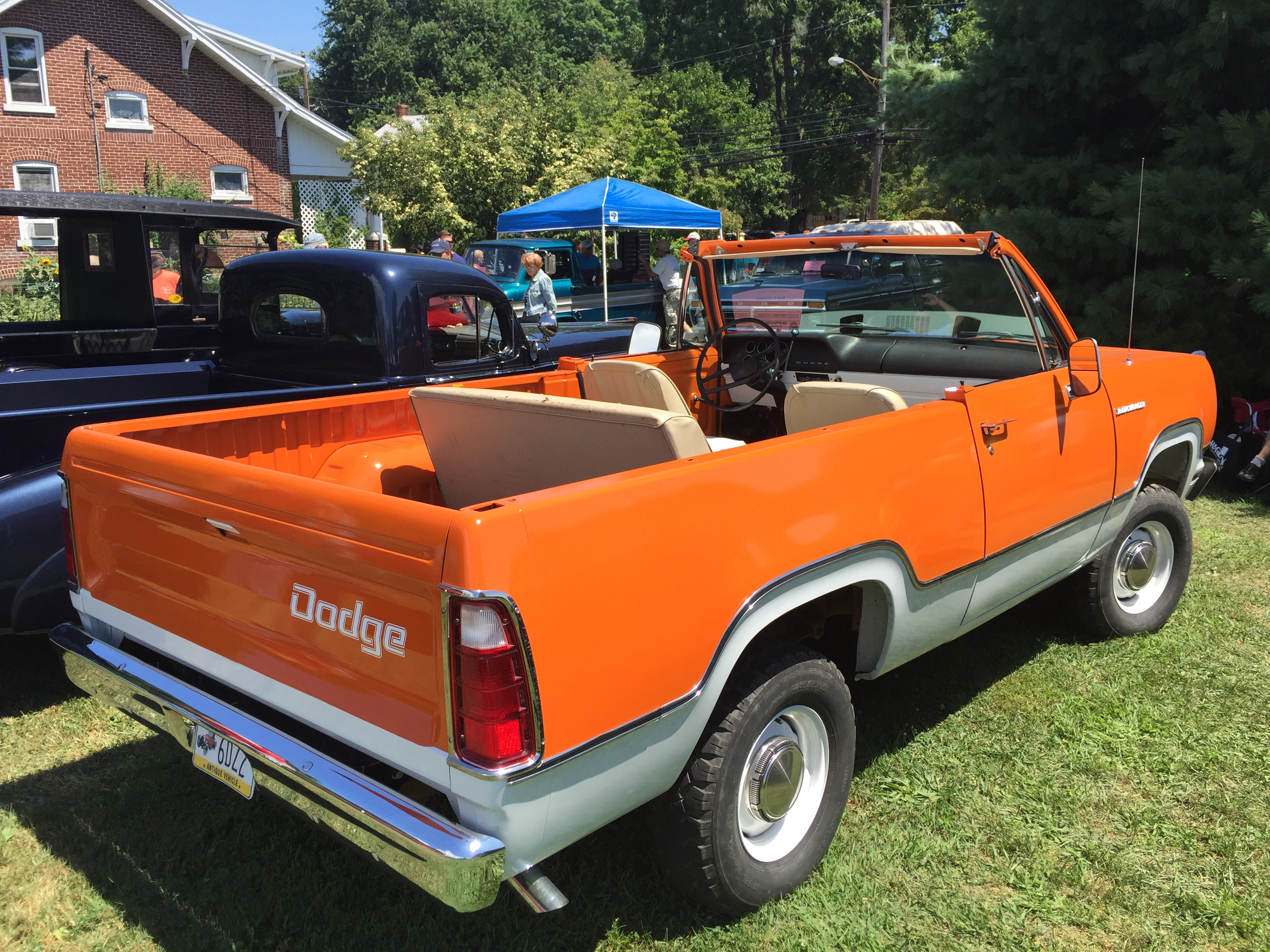
1974 Ramcharger with optional passenger and rear bench seats

The Ramcharger was entered in rallying and placed first in the 1975 Sno*Drift event.

The standard engine was a 225 cu in (3.7 L) Slant Six. 318 cu in (5.2 L) and 360 cu in (5.9 L) versions of the "LA" series Chrysler small-block V8 were available, along with the larger big-block "B" and "RB" wedge series in 400 cu in (6.6 L) and 440 cu in (7.2 L). In 1978, the 360 cu in (5.9 L) output was 175 hp (130 kW; 177 PS). In 1979, it was rated at 160 hp (119 kW; 162 PS).

== Second generation (1981–1993) ==
Second generation
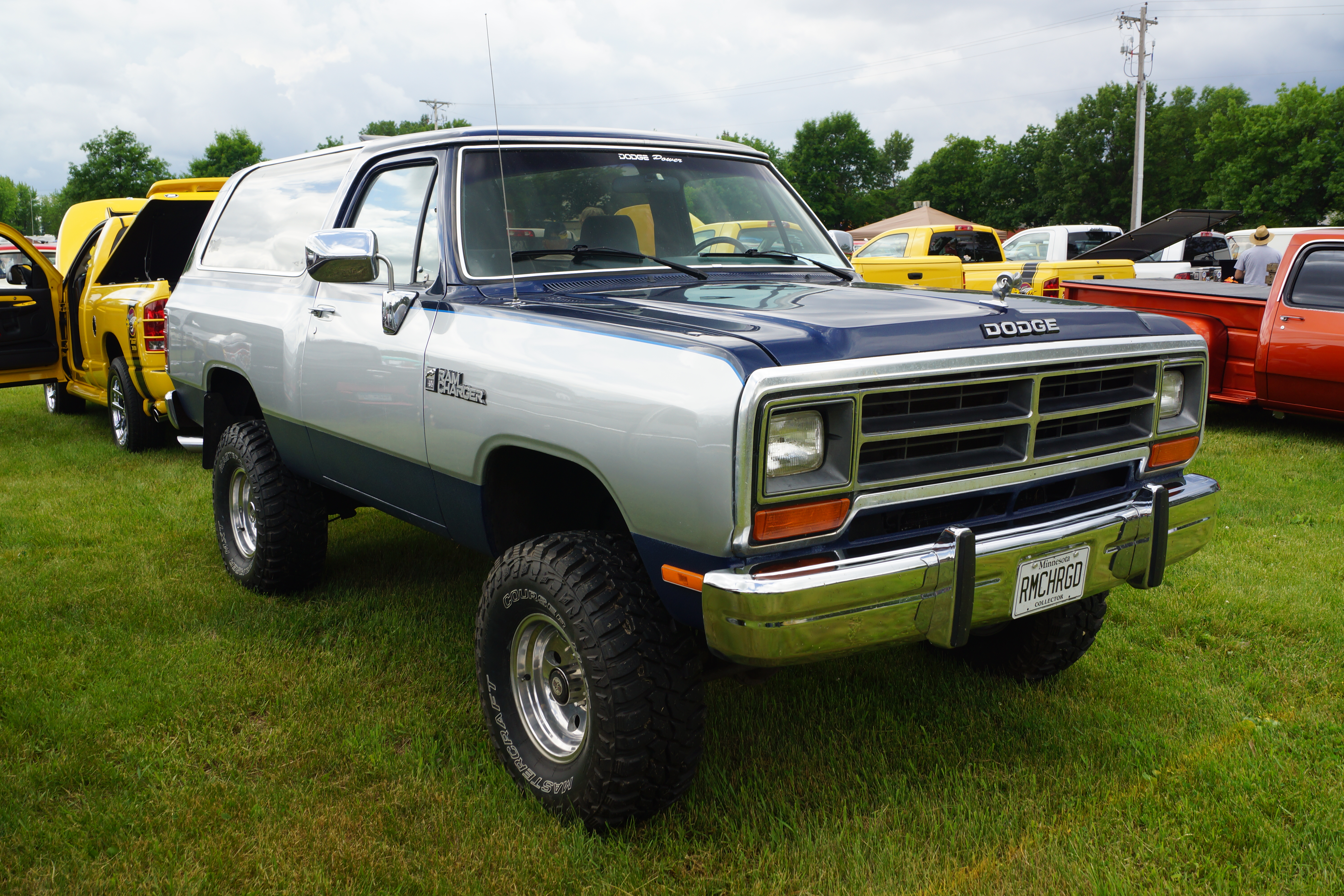

Overview
- Also called: Plymouth Trail Duster
- Production: 1981–1993; 1988–1996 (Mexico)

Body and chassis
- Platform: Chrysler AD platform
- Related: Dodge Ram

Powertrain
- Engine: 318 cu in (5.2 L) V8; 360 cu in (5.9 L) V8
- Transmission: 3-speed automatic 3-speed manual 4-speed manual 5-speed manual

Dimensions
- Wheelbase: 106.0 in (2,692 mm)
- Length: 1988–1990: 184.6 in (4,689 mm); 1991–93: 188.0 in (4,775 mm)
- Width: 79.5 in (2,019 mm)
- Height: 1988–1990 2WD: 69.7 in (1,770 mm); 1988–1990 4WD: 73.1 in (1,857 mm); 1991–93 4WD: 74.1 in (1,882 mm); 1991–93 2WD: 70.6 in (1,793 mm)

The Ramcharger and Trail Duster followed the D-series pickup's 1981 redesign into the Ram and is considered the second generation. They had an egg crate-style grille which was used until the 1986 model year, when the front was redesigned to the crosshair grille that remains common on many Dodges today. In 1991, there were another batch of grille changes that lasted until 1993 when American Ramcharger production stopped. The second-generation trucks had a few different trim and interior option levels, but not much changed over the years. These models had a non-removable welded steel top instead of the removable top. The Trail Duster was only available for one year with the Ram design and steel non-removable top, as it was dropped after the 1981 model year.

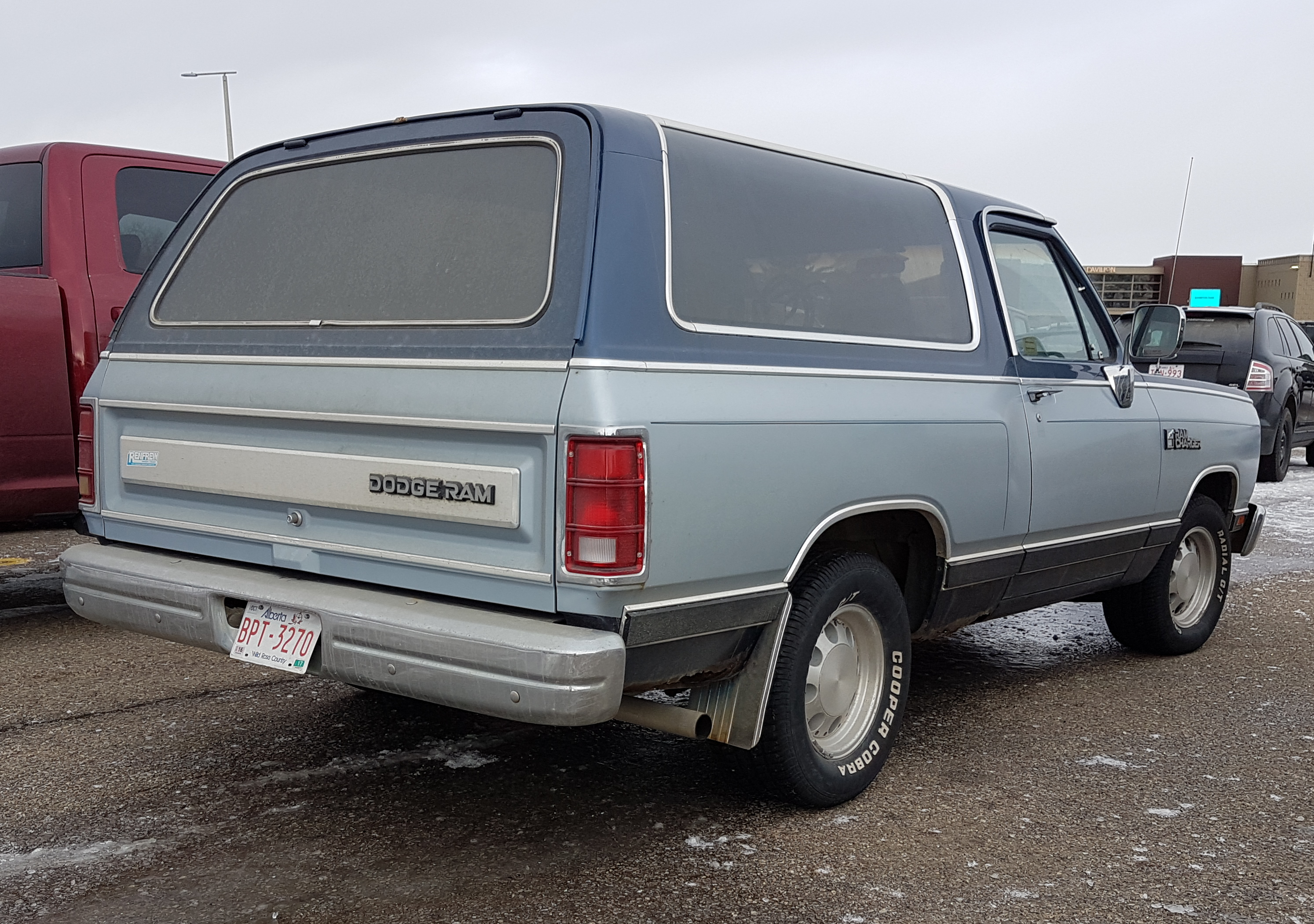
1990 Dodge Ramcharger rear

From 1981 through 1987, all models were carbureted, but in 1988, throttle-body fuel injection (TBI) was added to the 318 cu in (5.2 L) V8 engine. Fuel injection was added to the 360 cu in (5.9 L) V8 engine in 1989. Power output for the TBI 318 was 170 hp (127 kW; 172 PS) and 245 lb⋅ft (332 N⋅m) of torque. The 360 with TBI was rated at 193 hp (144 kW; 196 PS) and 285 lb⋅ft (386 N⋅m) of torque. In 1992, the multiport fuel-injected Magnum 318 was the standard engine, while the LA 360 with TBI was still offered as an option. In 1993, the Magnum 360 replaced the LA engine.

Many manual transmissions were offered throughout the years, starting with the A-230 three-speed and ending with the A-535 five-speed in 1992. The NP435 "granny gear" 4 speed was the most common in 4WD models, as well as the close ratio version, the NP445. In 1988 the clutch was converted from a mechanical linkage to a hydraulic system. Automatic transmission models had the Chrysler Loadflite TF-727A or B until, in 1991, it was replaced with the A-500/A-518 four-speed.

An all-wheel-drive NP-203 transfer case was standard until 1980, when it was replaced with the part-time NP-208. This was supplanted by the NP-241 in 1988. Axles were Dana 44 front and 9.25" or 8.25" Chrysler corporate rear. AWD models (1973–1979) were equipped with the full-time version of the Dana 44 that had no provision for locking hubs and had a front wheel bearing design with a somewhat dubious reputation. In 1978, when the part-time 4WD system was introduced, the front Dana 44 was equipped with a more conventional front wheel bearing design and automatic locking hubs. Late in the 1984 model year, the Dana 44 was switched to a CAD (Center Axle Disconnect) version. The CAD Dana 44 was vacuum-actuated by a switch on the transfer case and powered by engine vacuum. The CAD Dana 44 was carried on until the end of Ramcharger production in 1993. The vacuum switch on the transfer case would occasionally fail and either leave the CAD engaged or not engage the CAD at all. Limited-slip differentials were available for the 9¼" rear axle. The AWD versions used a 5 on 4.5" wheel bolt circle and the part-time 4WD models used a 5 on 5.5" bolt circle. 2WD models used the 5 on 4.5" wheel bolt circle, which was changed to the 5 on 5.5" pattern in 1985.

The Ramcharger continued to be sold in Mexico until 1996, with minor running changes from the last version sold in the U.S. and Canada in 1993.

== Third generation (1999–2001) ==
Third generation
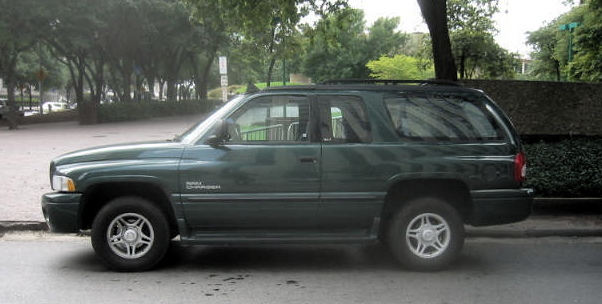

Overview
- Production: 1998–2001
- Model years: 1999–2001
- Assembly: Saltillo, Coahuila, Mexico

Body and chassis
- Related: Dodge Ram

Powertrain
- Engine: 318 cu in (5.2 L) V8; 360 cu in (5.9 L) V8
- Transmission: 4-speed automatic 4-speed manual

Dimensions
- Wheelbase: 113.7 in (2,888 mm)
- Length: 198 in (5,029 mm)
- Curb weight: 5,300 lb (2,404.0 kg)

The third generation Ramcharger was produced in Mexico from 1998 for the 1999 model year, based on the same platform as the Dodge Ram pickup and sharing most of its componentry with the Ram as well. It had also shared some of its parts and components with the third-generation Chrysler minivans (Chrysler Town & Country, Dodge Caravan/Plymouth Voyager) as well. It was only sold in Mexico where the previous-generation Ramcharger had been successful. It was available in the ST, SLT, SLT Plus, and Sport trim levels. Powered by the 318 cu in (5.2 L) or 360 cu in (5.9 L) Magnum V8 engine and offered exclusively with rear-wheel drive, it was discontinued after the 2001 model year.

One of the features of this generation was a small third-row folding seat in the cargo area that faced sideways, making it less practical for long trips.
