= Carryall =

Type of vehicle

The term carryall refers to several types of vehicles, including: historical carriages, automobiles, sleighs, and tractors.

== Horse-drawn carriage ==
Historically, a carryall was a type of carriage used in the United States in the 19th century. It is a light, four-wheeled vehicle, usually drawn by a single horse and with seats for four or more passengers. The word is derived by folk etymology from the French cariole.

== Automobile ==
The name carryall was later used for a panel truck with rear windows and folding rear seats, allowing for the transport of either passengers, cargo, or both. This sort of vehicle is an ancestor of today's sport utility vehicles. These vehicles were often converted by smaller coachbuilders as sales numbers were generally too small to justify tooling for series production. The Chevrolet Suburban SUV was once known as the Carryall Suburban.

== Sleigh ==
In Canada, the term "carryall" is often also used to refer to a type of sleigh. It is about 4 m (13 ft) long and 0.5 m (1.5 ft) wide, fitted with a canvas or hide container. It is pulled by dogs or a snowmobile. It is used principally by trappers and hunters to transport people and goods.

== Earthmoving equipment ==
The term is also used for a carrier with a scraper-like self-loading device drawn by a tractor, pushed by a bulldozer or self-propelled. It is used especially for hauling earth and crushed rock. Similarly in agricultural parlance it is often used to describe a platform device mounted to the rear three point linkage of smaller tractors for carrying materials particularly tools or stock feed.

== See also ==
- Chevrolet Suburban – offered as a "Carryall Suburban"
- Project Carryall, a Project Plowshare program to excavate for a highway in California with nuclear explosives
