= Warren Truck Assembly =

Chrysler automotive factory

- Built: 1938
- Operated: 1938–present
- Location: 21500 Mound Road; Warren, Michigan, United States
- Coordinates: 42°27′27″N 83°02′33″W
- Industry: Automotive
- Employees: 3,518 (2023)
- Area: 86.8 acres (0.351 km^{2})
- Owners: Chrysler (1938–1998); DaimlerChrysler (1998–2007); Chrysler (2007–2014); Fiat Chrysler Automobiles (2014–2021); Stellantis (2021–present)

Warren Truck Assembly is an automobile factory in Warren, Michigan owned and operated by Stellantis.

== History ==
The factory opened in 1938 and was known as "Dodge City" until the mid-2000s. The nearby Warren Stamping opened in 1949. In 1953, the Mound Road Engine plant opened just south of Eight Mile Road in Detroit.

There was once a nearby Sherwood Assembly, that closed in the late 1970s when Chrysler halted production of the Dodge Medium and Heavy Duty trucks and exited the market. It was located on the southwest corner of 9 Mile Road and Sherwood, adjacent to the Warren Assembly site on the east.

The facility was the site of Dodge Dakota production from 1987 to 2011, with over 2.75 million vehicles produced.

The Warren Truck plant became the sole source of Ram 1500 Rebel production in 2015.

The factory received a US$1 billion investment to upgrade and convert the facility to produce the revived Jeep Wagoneer, which was completed in 2020. In 2018, Fiat Chrysler said that it would move production of its Ram Heavy Duty trucks from Mexico to Warren. In 2021, Chrysler's new owner, Stellantis, announced that Heavy Duty trucks will continue to be produced in Mexico.

In August 2024, it was announced up to 2,450 workers at Warren Truck could be laid off as Ram 1500 Classic production comes to a close.

== Products ==
=== Current ===
- Jeep Wagoneer/Grand Wagoneer

=== Past ===
- Dodge A-Series
- Dodge B-Series Pickup
  - Dodge B-Series Van
- Dodge C-Series Pickup
- Dodge D-Series Pickup
- Dodge M Series motorhome chassis
- Dodge W-Series Pickup incl. Power Wagon
- Dodge Ramcharger through 1985
- Plymouth Trailduster
- Dodge Dakota
- Dodge Ram
- Dodge T-, V-, W-Series (1939–1947; civilian / commercial)
- Dodge M37
- Dodge VC, WC, VF and WF series (1940–1945; military)
- Mitsubishi Raider
- Ram 1500 Classic
- Ram Dakota

== See also ==
- List of Chrysler factories
