= Dodge C series =

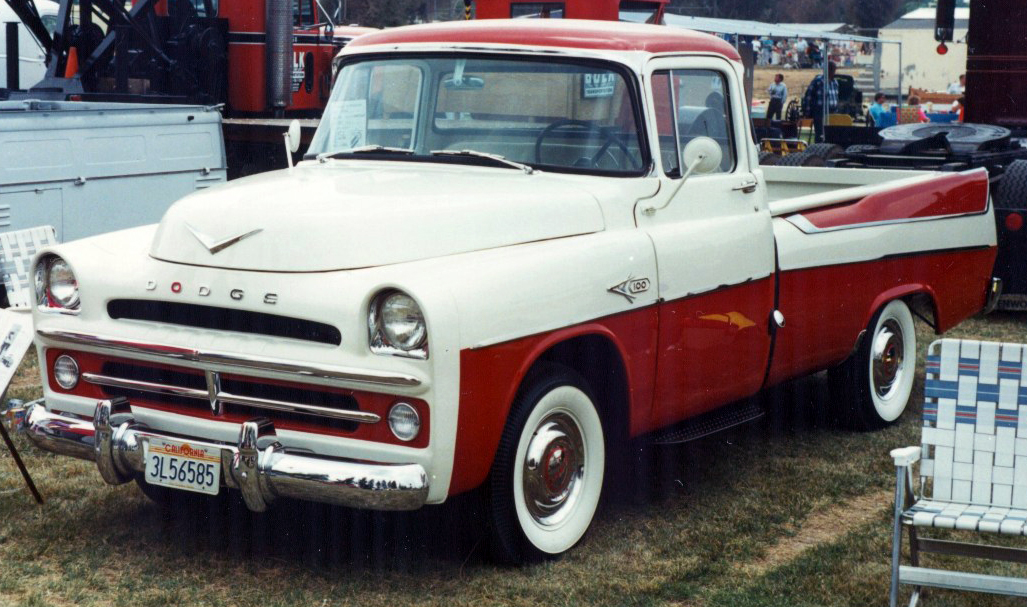
- 1957 C-100 Sweptside

Overview
- Manufacturer: Dodge (Chrysler)
- Production: 1954–1960
- Assembly: United States: Warren, Michigan (Warren Truck Assembly); United States: Los Angeles, California (until 1955)

Body and chassis
- Class: Full-size pickup truck
- Body style: 2-door pickup truck
- Layout: FR layout

Powertrain
- Engine: 230 cu in (3.8 L) I6; 315 cu in (5.2 L) V8; 318 cu in (5.2 L) V8; 331 cu in (5.4 L) V8
- Transmission: 3-speed automatic 2-speed PowerFlite automatic

Dimensions
- Wheelbase: 108 in (2,743 mm); 116 in (2,946 mm)

Chronology
- Predecessor: Dodge B series
- Successor: Dodge D series

The Dodge C series is a line of pickup trucks sold by Dodge from 1954 until 1960. It replaced the Dodge B series of trucks and was eventually supplanted by the Dodge D series, introduced in 1961. Unlike the B series, which were closely related to Dodge's prewar trucks, the C series was a complete redesign. Dodge continued the "pilot house" tradition of high-visibility cabs with a wrap-around windshield introduced in 1955. A two-speed "PowerFlite" automatic transmission was newly available that year. The Dodge Town Panel and Town Wagon also used the new design.

== History ==
The early models continued the naming convention of the predecessor - 1954 ½ ton trucks were named C-1-B, ¾-ton trucks C-1-C and 1 ton trucks C-1-D, whilst the 1955 models were named C-3 and 1956 C-4.

Chrysler called the Hemi-powered Dodge trucks "Power Giant" in 1957, and introduced power steering and brakes, a three-speed automatic, and a 12-volt electrical system. From 1957 to 1959, Dodge offered the Sweptside pickup, a rival to the Chevrolet Cameo Carrier, but it never became a bestseller. A flat-sided (and thus wider) "Sweptline" cargo box came in 1959. In 1957, the company also adopted the standard pickup truck numbering scheme, also used by Ford and GM at that time. Thus, the ½ ton Dodge was now called the D100, the ¾ ton D200 and 1 ton model D300. The traditional separate-fender body "Utiline" version remained available, with a GVWR of up to 9,000 lb (4,100 kg) on 1-ton models.

After an agreement between Dodge and Studebaker, the C-Series' pickup bed also saw use in the Studebaker Champ pickup truck range.

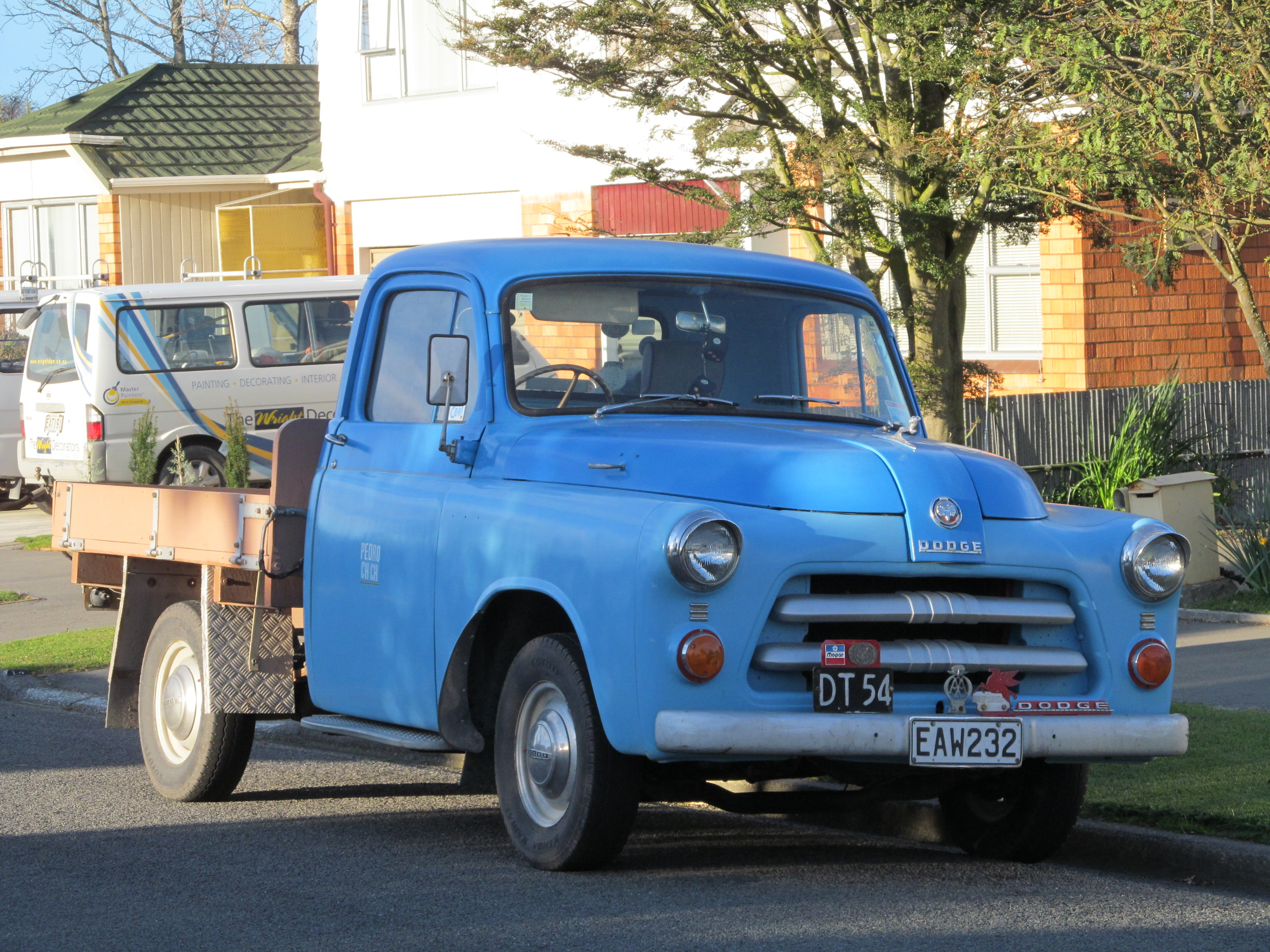
1954–1956 model

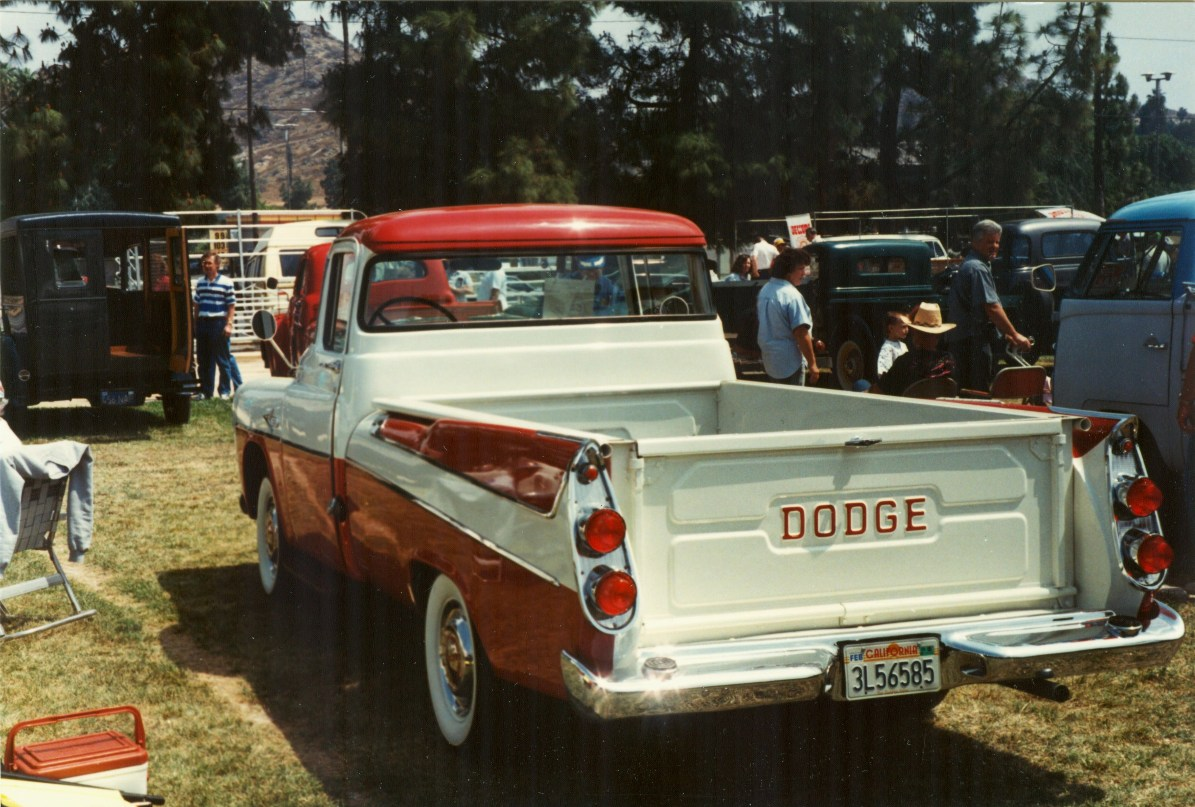
1957 model (Sweptside pickup)

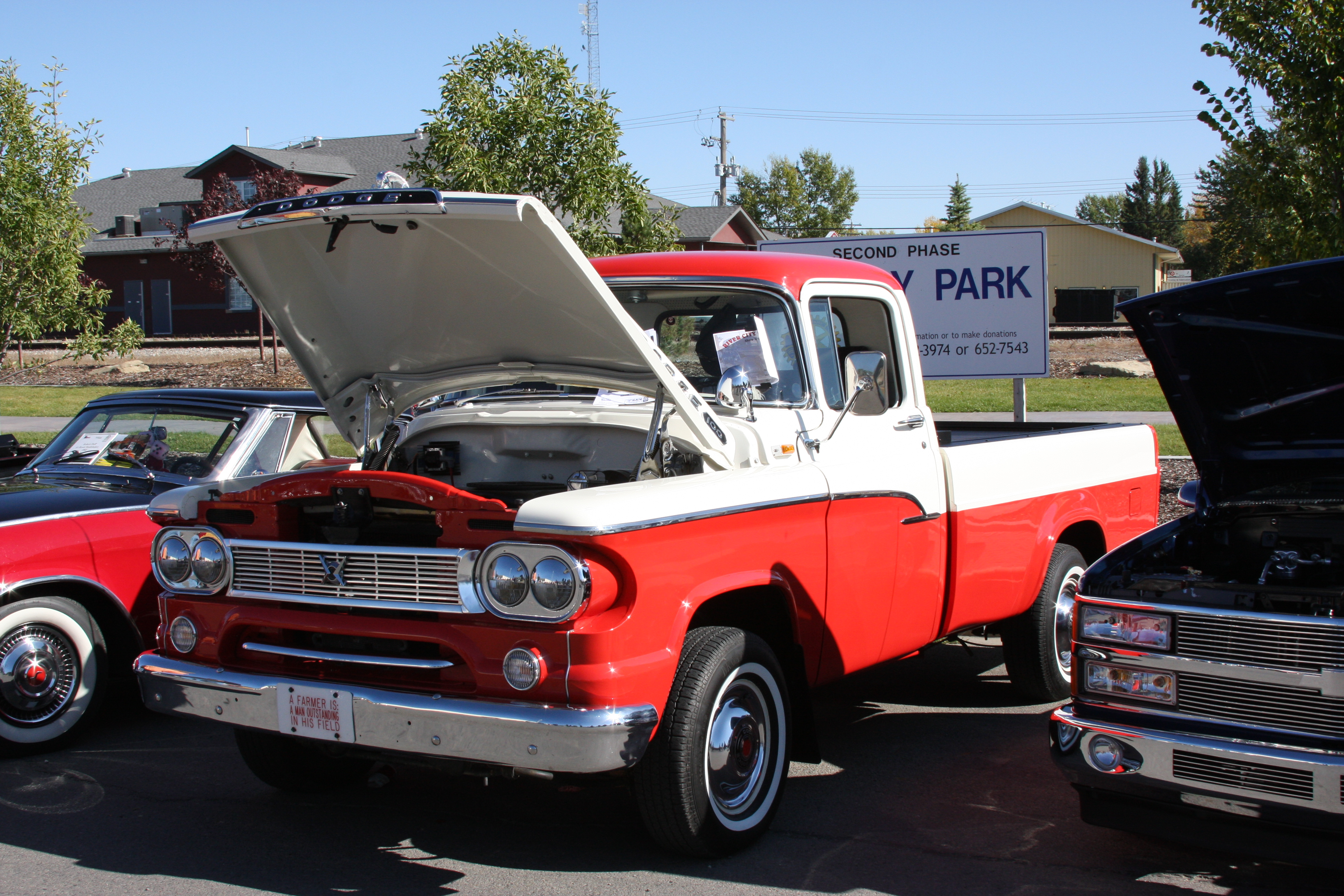
1958–1960 model

== Four-wheel-drive W-Series Power Wagons ==
Starting in the 1957 model year, factory four-wheel-drive versions of the Dodge C series trucks were produced and sold as the W-100, W-200, W-300, and W-500, alongside the older WDX/WM-300 "Military Style" Power Wagon. The latter had the "Power Wagon" badge on the fender. The heavy-duty four-wheel-drive W-300 and W-500 trucks were marketed as "Power Giants".

== Engines ==
- 1957–1960: 230 cu in (3.8 L) Flathead I6, 120 hp (89 kW)
- 1959: 331 cu in (5.4 L) FirePower V8, 172 hp (128 kW)
- 1957–1959: 315 cu in (5.2 L) Red Ram V8, 204 hp (152 kW)
- 1959: 318 cu in (5.2 L) A-type V8, 200 hp (149 kW)

== Medium-duty/heavy-duty C series ==
Since it still used the older cab design, the C series name was continued for Dodge's line of medium- and heavy-duty trucks (better known as the LCF series) through the 1975 model year, long after most of Dodge's other trucks had moved to the newer D series designation.

Four Wheel Drive also utilized the C series cabs for many of its medium- and heavy-duty trucks. Because Chrysler needed plant capacity for its newer light-duty truck models, manufacture of these later C series cabs — for both Dodge and FWD — was outsourced to Checker in Kalamazoo, MI, beginning in 1962.
