= Ford F-Series (seventh generation) =

Seventh generation of the Ford F-Series pickup trucks

Ford F-series (seventh generation)
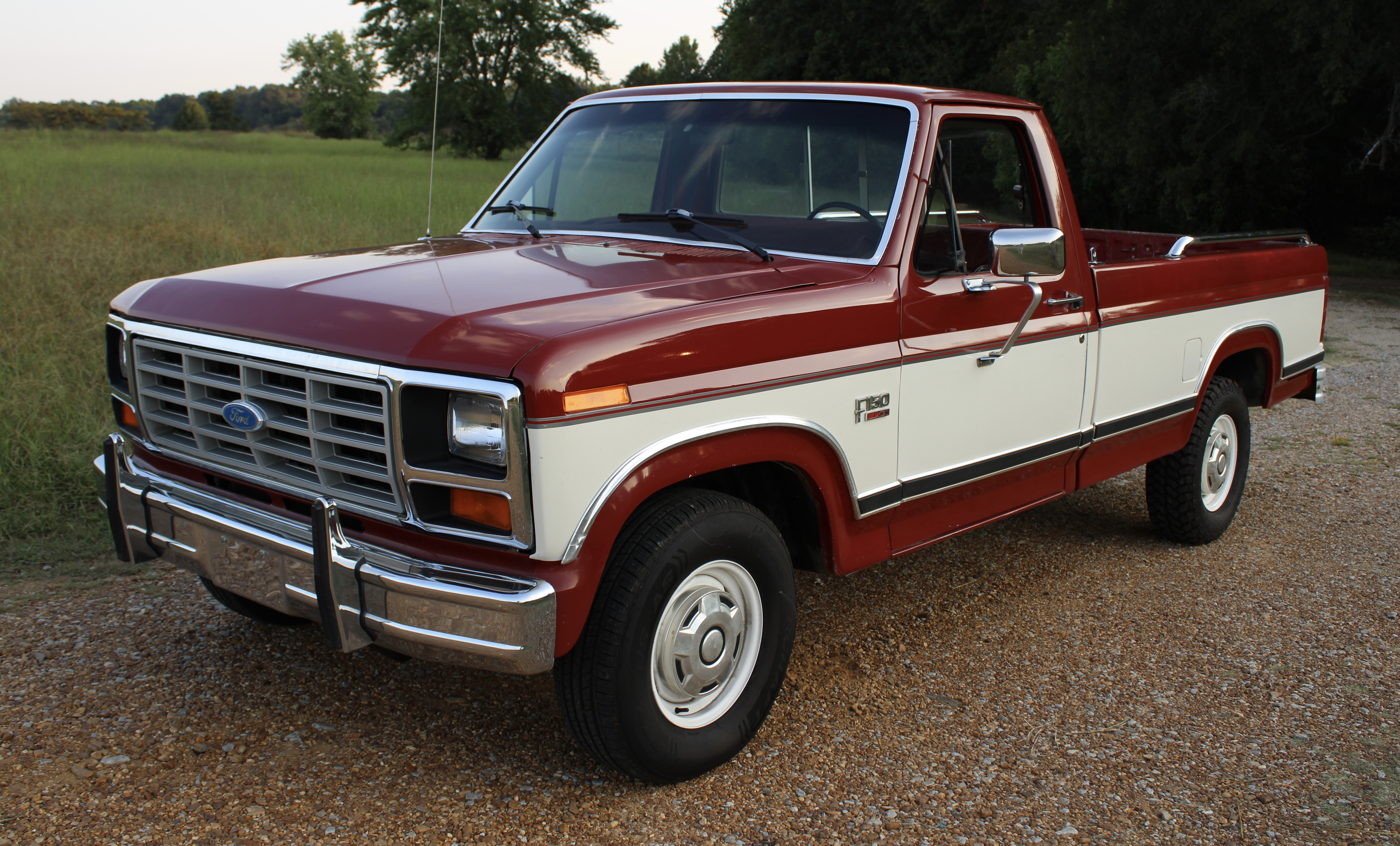
- 1986 Ford F-150 XL

Overview
- Manufacturer: Ford
- Production: September 1979 – 1986; 1980–1986 (Mexico and Venezuela); 1981–1987 (Argentina: light-duty); 1982–1990 (Argentina: Ford medium duty)
- Model years: 1980–1986
- Assembly: North America: Dearborn, Michigan (Ford Rouge Complex); Louisville, Kentucky (Louisville Assembly); St. Paul, Minnesota (Twin Cities Assembly); Claycomo, Missouri (Kansas City Assembly); Norfolk, Virginia (Norfolk Assembly); Wayne, Michigan (Michigan Truck Plant); Milpitas, California (San Jose Assembly); Oakville, Ontario, Canada (Ontario Truck); Cuautitlán Izcalli, Mexico (Cuautitlán Stamping and Assembly); International production: General Pacheco, Argentina (Pacheco Stamping and Assembly); Broadmeadows, Australia

Body and chassis
- Body style: 2-door pickup 2-door extended cab 4-door pickup

Powertrain
- Engine: Gasoline; 221 CID (3.6 L) Falcon (F-100, Argentina); 232 CID (3.8 L) Essex V6 (1982-83 (US), 1986 F-150, Mexico); 250 CID (4.1 L) I-6 (Australia); 255 CID (4.2 L) small block V8; 292 CID (4.8 L) Fase II V8 (F-150, F-250, F-350 and F-600, Argentina); 300 CID (4.9 L) I6; 302 CID (5.0 L) small block V8; 335 CID (5.4 L) small block V8 (F-600, Mexico); 351 CID (5.8 L) Windsor V8; 351 CID (5.8 L) Cleveland V8 (1980–85, Australia); 400 CID (6.6 L) 335 V8; 460 CID (7.5 L) 385 V8; Diesel; 203 CID (3.3 L) Perkins I4 (F-100, Argentina); 305 CID (5.0 L) Perkins I6 (F-250, F-350, F-400 and F-600, Argentina); 354 CID (5.8 L) Perkins I6 (F-600 and F-700/7000, Argentina); 373 CID (6.1 L) Deutz I6 (F-700/7000, Argentina); 420 CID (6.9 L) International IDI V8
- Transmission: Automatic; 3-speed Ford C4; 3-speed Ford C6; 4-speed Ford AOD; Manual; 3-speed (Column); 4-speed Borg-Warner T18; 4-speed Borg-Warner T19; 4-speed New Process NP435; 4-speed Ford RUG/TUG/SROD

Dimensions
- Wheelbase: Regular cab 8' box: 133 in (3,378 mm); Regular cab 6.75' box/Flareside: 117 in (2,972 mm); SuperCab 8' box: 155 in (3,937 mm); SuperCab 6.75' box: 138.8 in (3,526 mm); Crew cab: 168.4 in (4,277 mm)
- Length: Regular cab 8' box: 213.3 in (5,418 mm); Regular cab 6.75' box: 197.1 in (5,006 mm); SuperCab 8' box: 235.3 in (5,977 mm); SuperCab 6.75' box: 219.1 in (5,565 mm); Crew cab: 248.9 in (6,322 mm)
- Width: 79 in (2,007 mm)

Chronology
- Predecessor: Ford F-Series (sixth generation) (1973–1979)
- Successor: Ford F-Series (eighth generation) (1987–1991)

The seventh generation of the Ford F-Series is a range of trucks that was produced by Ford from the 1980 to 1986 model years. The first complete redesign of the F-Series since the 1965 model year, the seventh generation received a completely new chassis and body, distinguished by flatter body panels and a squarer grille, earning the nickname "bullnose" from enthusiasts. This generation marked several firsts for the model line, including the introduction of the Ford Blue Oval grille emblem, the introduction of a diesel engine to the model line, and a dashboard with a full set of instruments (optional). Conversely, this generation marked the end of the long-running F-100, the Ranger trim, and sealed-beam headlamps.

Serving as the basis for the eighth and ninth-generation F-Series, the 1980 F-Series architecture lasted through the 1997 model year, also underpinning the Ford Bronco from 1980 to 1996. Though sharing almost no body parts, the model line again shared mechanical commonality with the Ford E-Series.

Through its production, this generation of the F-Series was produced by Ford by multiple sites in North America and by Ford Argentina and Ford Australia.

== Background ==
Halfway through its model cycle, the sixth-generation Ford F-Series became the best-selling truck in the United States in year 1. During the development of the seventh-generation F-Series, the 1979 oil crisis led to increased attention toward fuel economy; in addition, light trucks (including most models of the F-Series) saw the introduction of federal fuel economy standards (CAFE).

In contrast to Ford full-size car lines (such as the Ford LTD), downsizing could not be considered as a practical design option. Though minor adjustments in size could be made to the model line, preserving payload capability was a key consideration, along with retaining and upgrading design features that consumers had found popular in the previous generation.

Along with increasing capability and fuel economy, a central part of the development was to improve corrosion protection. While the previous generation phased in plastic fender liners in 1977, Ford further researched corrosion reduction, designing the cab and bed to reduce the amount of trapped road grime.

== Design history ==
=== 1980–1981 ===
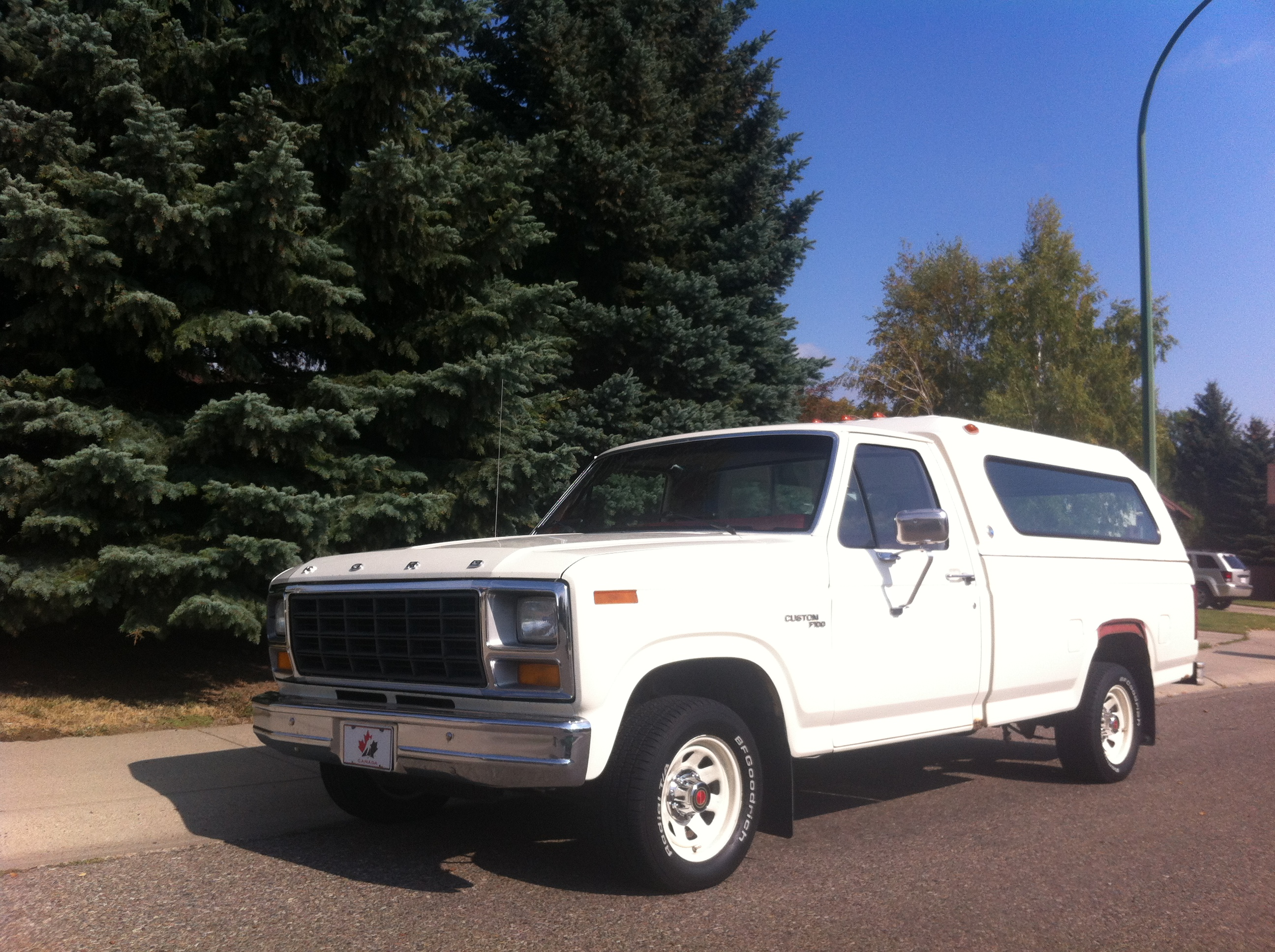
1980 F-100 Custom

For 1980, the seventh-generation F-Series was introduced, offering the standard cab and the SuperCab extended cab. As part of several functional upgrades, the vehicle received a column-mount ignition switch and an interior-mount hood release. While the 4-door crew cab was dropped from the line, a new "Six Wheeler" dual-rear-wheel option for the standard cab F-350 pickup was introduced.

For 1981, the exterior and interior were effectively carryover, with Ford focusing revisions to the powertrain. After standardizing them on two-wheel-drive trucks the year before, Ford made radial-ply tires standard on all F-Series pickups. In another change, halogen headlamps were introduced as a standard feature. As an additional model, Ford introduced the F-250HD, effectively a hybrid of the F-250 and F-350, with GVWRs in excess of 8,500 pounds.

=== 1982–1983 ===
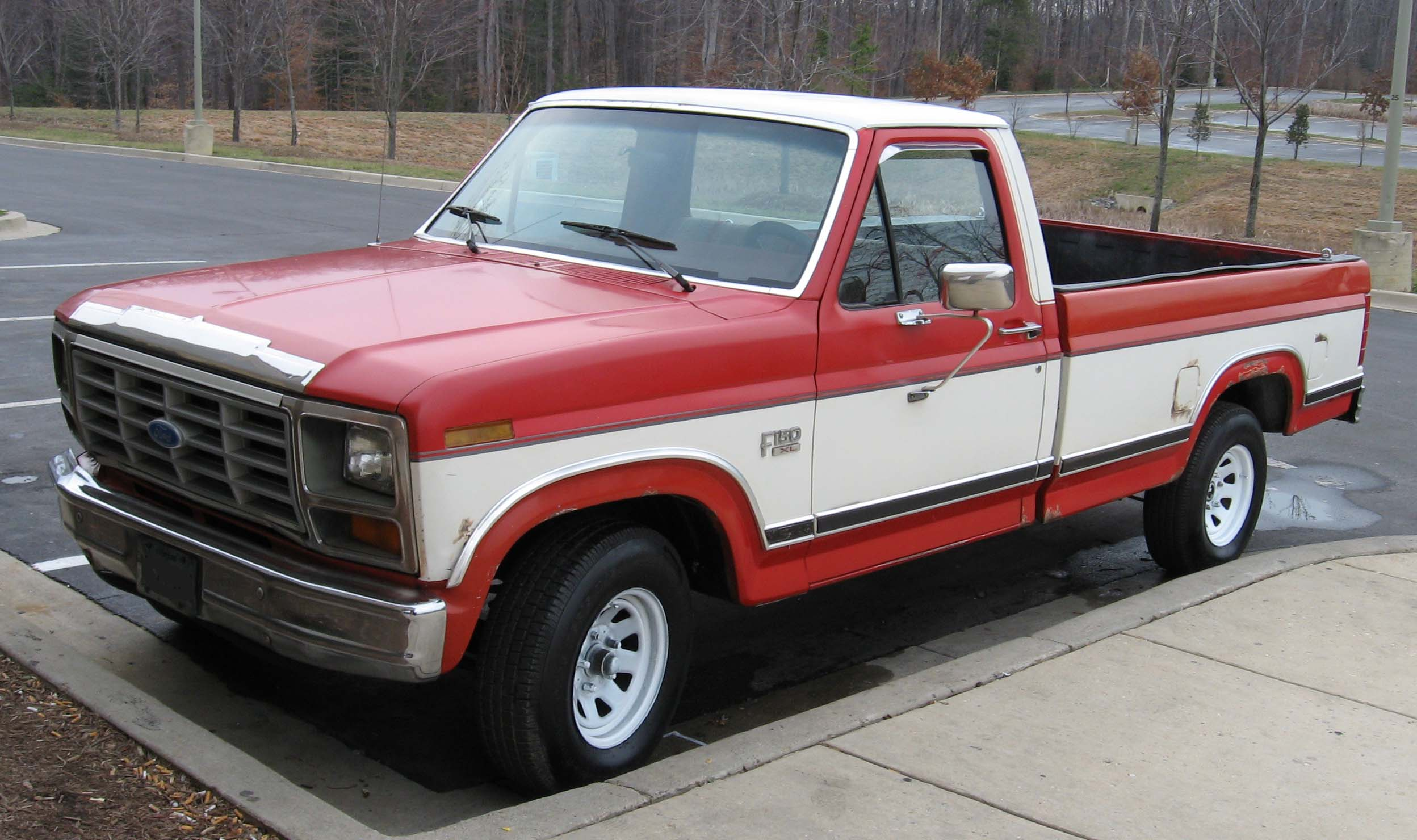
1982–1983 Ford F-150 XL

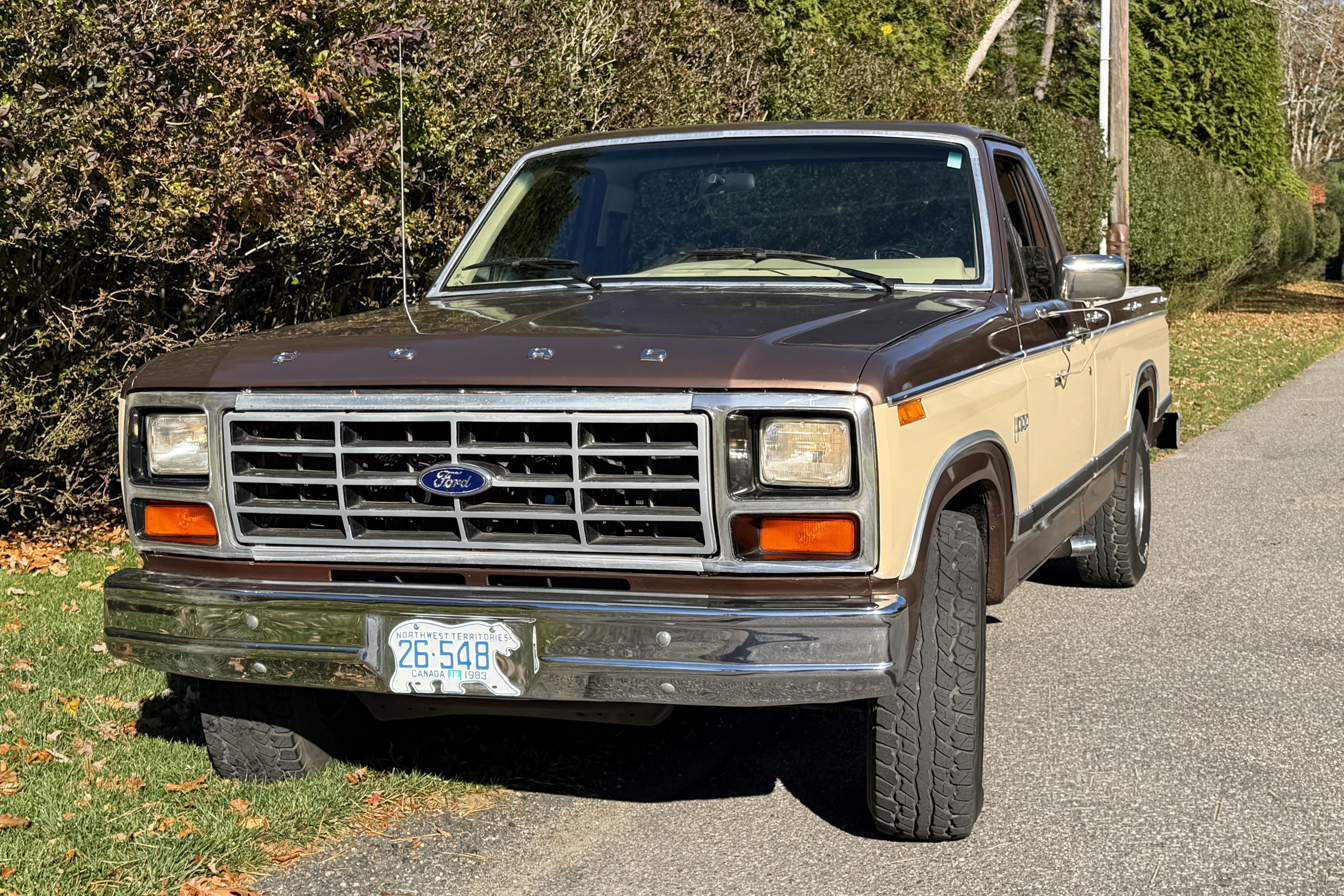
1983 Ford F-100, the final model year of the F-100 in the United States

For the 1982 model year, the F-Series underwent a minor facelift to the front fascia. Along with a simpler grille design, the update replaced the "FORD" hood lettering with the Ford Blue Oval emblem centered in the grille; with the exception of Ford Raptor vehicles, this design remains in use on currently-produced F-Series vehicles. In another change, fender badging was redesigned, switching emphasis from trim to model series (with larger F-100/F-150/F-250/F-350 badges). To accommodate for the introduction of the Ford Ranger compact pickup truck, the Ranger trim was dropped and multiple revisions were made to the trim line. In another change, the free-standing Camper Special option package was discontinued, functionally combined with the Trailer Towing package.

For 1983, Ford returned the four-door crew cab to the model line (last seen for 1979), offering it only for the single-rear-wheel F-350. The options and trim lines underwent further revision, as the Free-Wheeling option package became a free-standing XLS trim level (still intended as the sportiest version of the F-Series). As the model line was largely overshadowed by both the F-150 and the smaller Ranger (with some versions nearly matching it in payload capability), 1983 was the final year for the long-running F-100 pickup truck.

=== 1984–1986 ===
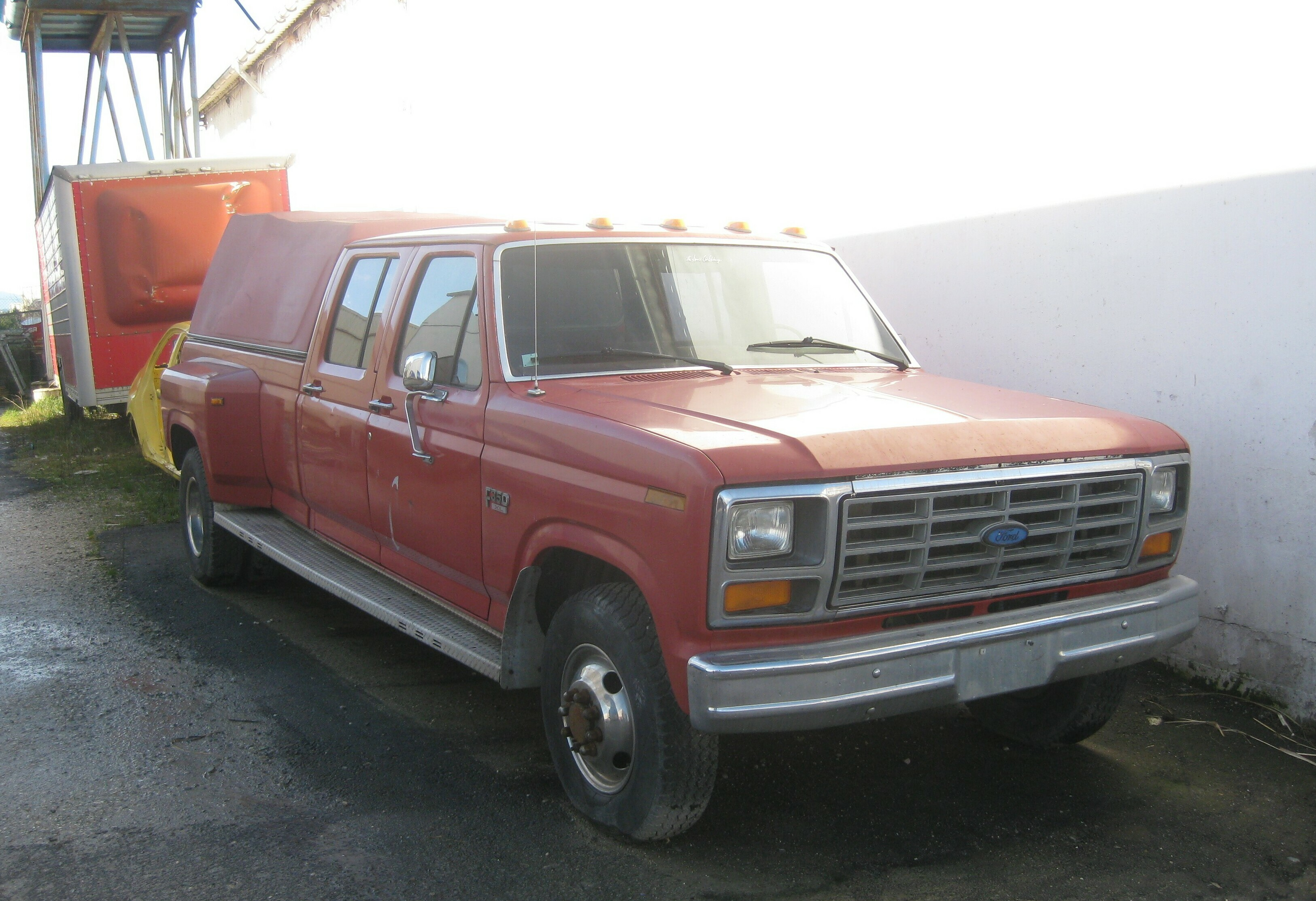
1985–1986 F-350 crew cab DRW

For 1984, the F-150 became the smallest version of the model line, following the retirement of the F-100. As a safety change, a clutch interlock prevented engine starts without depressing the clutch pedal. To further combat corrosion, Ford increased the use of galvanized and pre-treated steel body panels.

For 1985, the interior underwent a minor revision. While the dashboard design remained the same, the optional woodgrain trim was updated for a more modern appearance; in a similar fashion, the seat trim was updated. The F-350 model line was expanded, as the crew cab became available with dual rear wheels. As an option on higher-trim vehicles, Ford introduced a brushed-aluminum overlay trim panel for the rear tailgate, mounted flush between the taillamps.

For 1986, the F-Series saw few substantial changes. To streamline production, all vehicles received a full set of instruments (with only the tachometer remaining optional). Two-tone paint options were revised, as Ford deleted options that painted the roof and/or cab with the accent color. To simplify ordering and production, Preferred Equipment Packages were paired directly with trim levels, reducing the number of distinct options; traditional stand-alone option packages remained in place.

== Design overview ==
=== Chassis ===
The first ground-up change to the F-series platform since 1965, the 1980 F-Series chassis used an all-new design, though returning to body-on-frame construction. Again using 8-inch frame rails for the ladder frame, the new chassis adopted nearly identical wheelbases from the 1973–1979 generation.

==== Powertrain details ====
During its production, the seventh generation would see multiple revisions to the powertrain line, also marking several firsts for the F-Series. For 1980, the powertrain line was nearly carryover from 1979. The standard engine was a 4.9 L I6 (the 300 Truck Six), with an optional 4.9 L V8 (the 302 V8, branded as 5.0 L), 5.8 L V8 (351M), and 6.6 L V8 (400); the 7.5 L V8 was dropped from the F-Series entirely. Several different transmissions were offered for the wide variety of engines used by the model line. On two-wheel-drive trucks, a column-shifted three-speed manual was standard, with a four-speed manual offered as an option (the latter was standard on four-wheel-drive trucks). In 1980, the three-speed "Select-Shift" C6 automatic was the sole automatic transmission offering.

For 1981, Ford introduced a 4.2 L V8 (a smaller-displacement 4.9 L) as an option (exclusive to the F-100); the 115-hp engine was the smallest-displacement V8 offered on a modern American pickup truck. A four-speed manual overdrive transmission and a four-speed automatic with overdrive became offered as options.

For 1982, a 110-horsepower 3.8 L V6 was introduced as the standard engine for the F-100 (the 4.9 L six remained available on the F-150 and F-250), becoming the first V6 engine offered in the F-Series (and the smallest-displacement engine offered since 1953).

For 1983, several changes were made to the engine line. The 4.2 L V8 was discontinued, making the 3.8L V6 the base engine for the F-100, the 4.9L Six (required in California) and 4.9 V8 were optional. As the 5.8 L (351M) and 6.6 L V8s ended production altogether, Ford introduced a different 5.8 L (351W) to the model line, serving as the first F-Series engine with computerized engine controls. Replacing the 6.6 L engine, the 7.5 L V8 made its return in the F-250HD and F-350 (becoming offered for four-wheel-drive models for the first time); the first diesel engine in a light-duty F-Series model was also introduced (the International 6.9 L IDI V8).

For 1984, the 3.8 L V6 was dropped from the F-Series (as the F-100 had been discontinued), with the 4.9 L now again serving as the standard engine. As an additional option, an "HO" version of the 5.8 L V8 was introduced; a 4-bbl carburetor increased output from 150 to 210 hp.

For 1985, Ford revised several engines of the F-Series (though the powertrain lineup remained unchanged). After its introduction to the 5.8 L V8 for 1983, the 5.0 L V8 and 4.9 L I6 both received EEC-IV computer controls; the 4.9 L V8 became the first Ford light truck engine to receive fuel injection (adding 52hp to its output).

For 1986, the engine line returned virtually unchanged. The column-shifted 3-speed manual transmission was in its final year; the second-to-last American vehicle with the design (ending in 1987 with Chevrolet/GMC half-ton two-wheel-drive pickup trucks).

Ford F-Series engines (1980–1986)
| Engine | Configuration | Fuel delivery | Production | Output | | Notes |
| Engine | Configuration | Fuel delivery | Production | Power | Torque | Notes |
|---|---|---|---|---|---|---|
| Ford Essex V6 | 3.8 L (232 cu in) V6 | 2bbl | 1982–83 (1986 in Mexico) | 110 hp (82 kW) | 183 lb⋅ft (248 N⋅m) | Standard on F-100 models Not available in California |
| Ford Alloy Head/Alloy Head II I6 | 4.1 L (250 cu in) crossflow I6 | 1bbl 2bbl | 1980–82 1982–85 | 126 hp (94 kW) 131 hp (98 kW) | 215 lb⋅ft (292 N⋅m) 229 lb⋅ft (310 N⋅m) | Australian market only |
| Ford Small Block V8 | 4.2 L (255 cu in) V8 | 2bbl | 1981–82 | 115 hp (86 kW) | 206 lb⋅ft (279 N⋅m) | |
| Ford Truck Six (300) | 4.9 L (300 cu in) I6 | 1bbl | 1980 | 117 hp (87 kW) | 227 lb⋅ft (308 N⋅m) | |
| Ford Truck Six (300) | 4.9 L (300 cu in) I6 | 1bbl | 1980 | 120 hp (89 kW) | 229 lb⋅ft (310 N⋅m) | Only available on F-350 |
| Ford Truck Six (300) | 4.9 L (300 cu in) I6 | 1bbl | 1981–86 | 125 hp (93 kW) | 250 lb⋅ft (339 N⋅m) | |
| Ford Small Block V8 | 4.9 L (302 cu in) V8 | 2bbl | 1980–85 | 133 hp (99 kW) | 233 lb⋅ft (316 N⋅m) | |
| Ford Small Block V8 | 4.9 L (302 cu in) V8 | EFI | 1985–86 | 190 hp (142 kW) | 285 lb⋅ft (386 N⋅m) | |
| Ford 351M V8 | 5.8 L (351 cu in) V8 | 2bbl | 1980–82 | 136 hp (101 kW) | 262 lb⋅ft (355 N⋅m) | |
| Ford Small Block V8 | 5.8 L (351 cu in) V8 | 2bbl | 1980–82 | 136 hp (101 kW) | 262 lb⋅ft (355 N⋅m) | |
| Ford Cleveland V8 | 5.8 L (351 cu in) V8 | 4bbl | 1980–85 | 217 hp (162 kW) | 306 lb⋅ft (415 N⋅m) | Australian market only |
| Ford Small Block V8 | 5.8 L (351 cu in) V8 | 2bbl | 1983–85 | 150 hp (112 kW) | 280 lb⋅ft (380 N⋅m) | |
| Ford Small Block HO V8 | 5.8 L (351 cu in) V8 | 4bbl | 1984–86 | 210 hp (157 kW) | 305 lb⋅ft (414 N⋅m) | 1984–85 only available on special-ordered F-150 models (VIN code well as HD F-250 and F-350 models 1986 available all models |
| Ford 400 V8 | 6.6 L (400 cu in) V8 | 2bbl | 1980–82 | 153 hp (114 kW) | 309 lb⋅ft (419 N⋅m) | Only available on models over 8,500 pounds GVWR (F-250 HD and F-350) |
| International Harvester IDI V8 (diesel) | 6.9 L (420 cu in) V8 | IDI (diesel) | 1983–86 | 150 hp (112 kW) | 285 lb⋅ft (386 N⋅m) | Only available on models over 8,500 pounds GVWR (F-250 HD and F-350) |
| International Harvester IDI V8 (diesel) | 6.9 L (420 cu in) V8 | IDI (diesel) | 1983–86 | 170 hp (127 kW) | 315 lb⋅ft (427 N⋅m) | Only available on models over 8,500 pounds GVWR (F-250 HD and F-350) |
| Ford 385 V8 | 7.5 L (460 cu in) V8 | 4bbl | 1983–86 | 245 hp (183 kW) | 380 lb⋅ft (515 N⋅m) | Only available on models over 8,500 pounds GVWR (F-250 HD and F-350) |

==== Suspension components ====
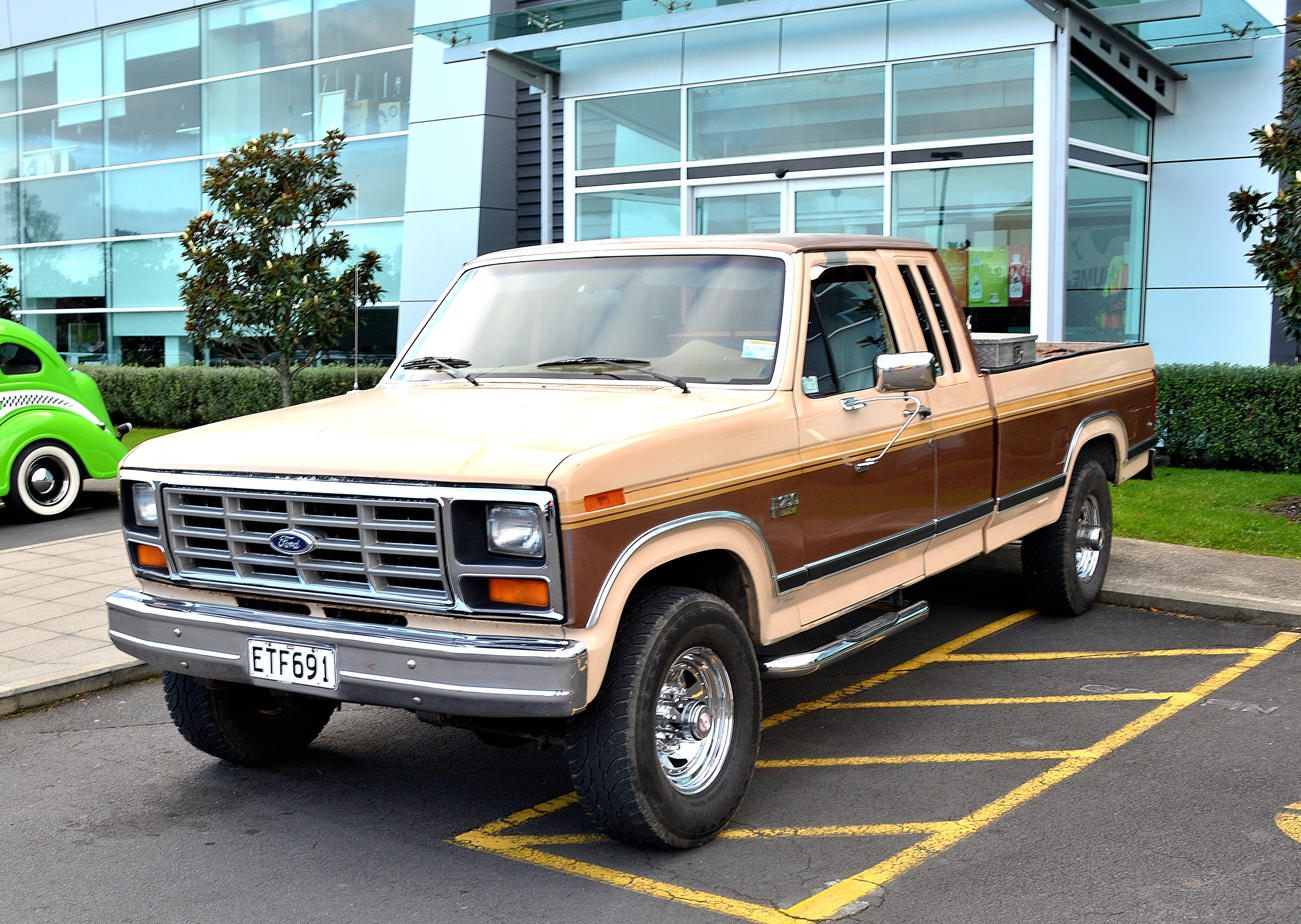
1986 Ford F-250 XLT Lariat SuperCab 4x4

On two-wheel-drive vehicles, the Twin-I-Beam independent front suspension made its return; on four-wheel-drive vehicles, the live front axle was replaced by a "Twin Traction Beam" design. The first standard-equipment independent front suspension system used in a four-wheel-drive pickup truck, Twin Traction Beam (TTB) is a variant of the Twin-I-Beam design, with one of the coil-sprung front I-beam axles supporting the front differential.

The F-150 used a light duty Dana 44 TTB. From 1980 to 1984, the rear axle was typically a Ford 9-inch axle, with the Ford 8.8 axle being phased in gradually; the 9-inch ended production (alongside this generation) in 1986.

The F-250 used an 8-lug version of the Dana 44 TTB called the Dana 44 TTBHD with the Dana 50 TTB being an option. The standard rear axle was a Dana 60 until mid-1985 when Ford phased out that axle for their own Sterling 10.25. Dana 60s could be either full-floating or semi-floating and came with a range of gear ratios. Semi-floating Dana 60s were either C-clip style, which used C-clips to hold the axle shafts in, or pressed-in bearings which held the axles in with a special wheel bearing that bolted to the outer axle housing inside the brake drum. These were typically used in lighter-duty trucks. Up until then, early 1985 models were built with leftover 1984 materials, making some parts difficult to find. For the 1983 model year, and the release of the 6.9 IDI, the F-250 HD offered the Dana 70 single-rear-wheel rear axle used in the F-350. The only difference between the F-250 HD and the SRW F-350 is the leaf size.

The F-350 used the Dana 50 TTB in front until a mid-year change in 1985, when the F-350 was fitted with the Dana 60 solid front axle. F-250s could be ordered with a Dana 50 TTB if it was a heavier duty model; all other F-250s were equipped with a Dana 44 TTB. These trucks were leaf sprung and used a single gas shock with no coil springs and radius arms like on the F-150. For the rear axle, the F-350 trucks used a Dana 60 for the single-rear-wheel trucks and a Dana 70 for the heavier-duty SRW and dual-rear-wheel trucks until mid-1985, when Ford once again phased in its own Sterling 10.25 axle.

Factory lifts used 2" blocks on the rear suspension, or 2" front and 4" rear on HD trucks, usually on F-250s and higher trims. Heavier duty F-150s could be ordered with 2" blocks.

==== Four-wheel drive system ====
With the exception of the F-100, four-wheel drive was offered for all versions of the seventh-generation F-Series during its production. Along with manual front hubs, the F-Series also offered automatically locking front hubs. Through its entire production, the model line used either the New Process Gear NP208F or transfer cases sourced from Borg-Warner. Using a manual two-speed design, the F-Series 4×4 used a stick-shift 4WD engagement (4 Low, 4 High, Neutral, and 2 High).

=== Body design ===
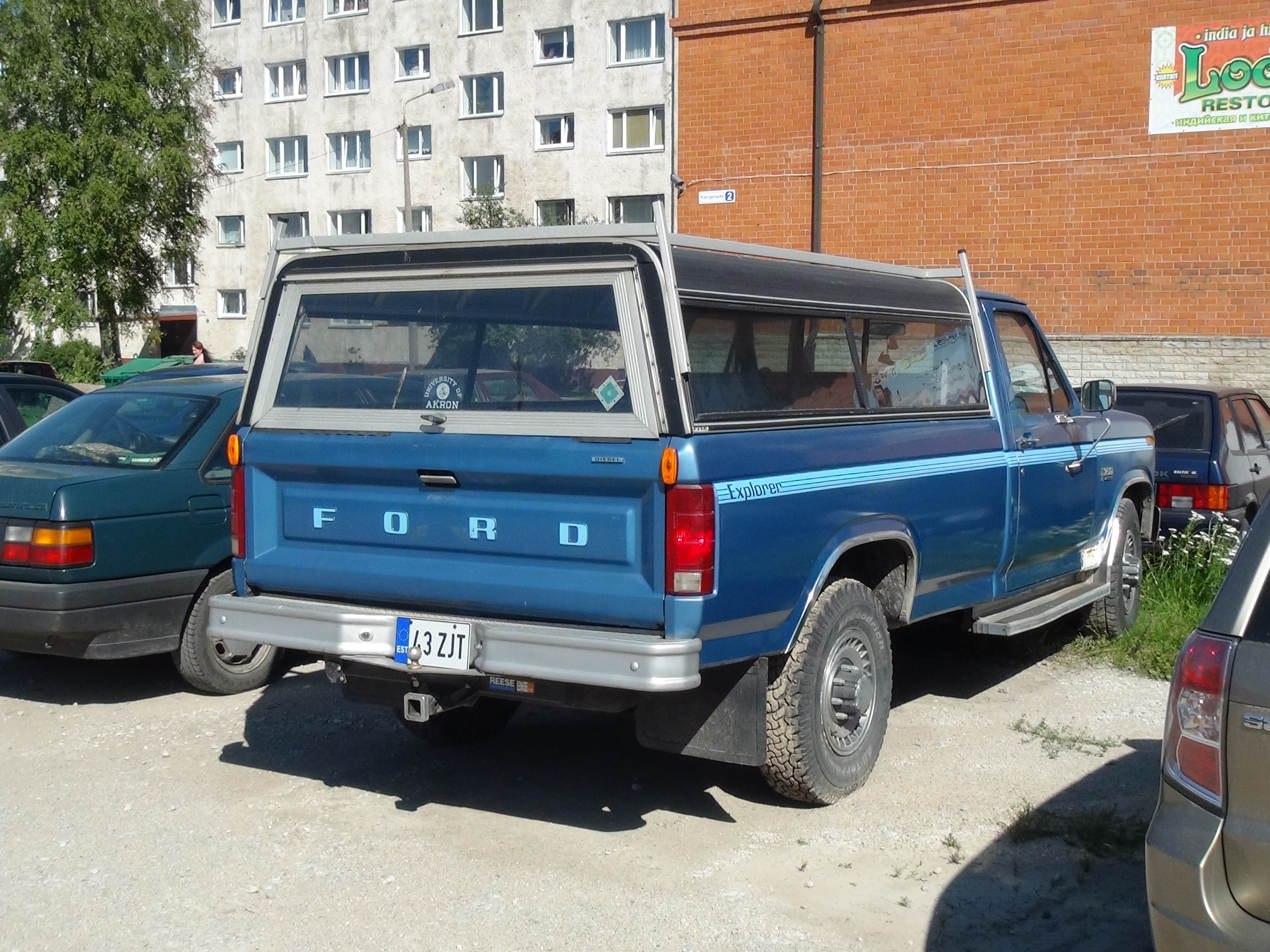
1983–1986 Ford F-250 rear view

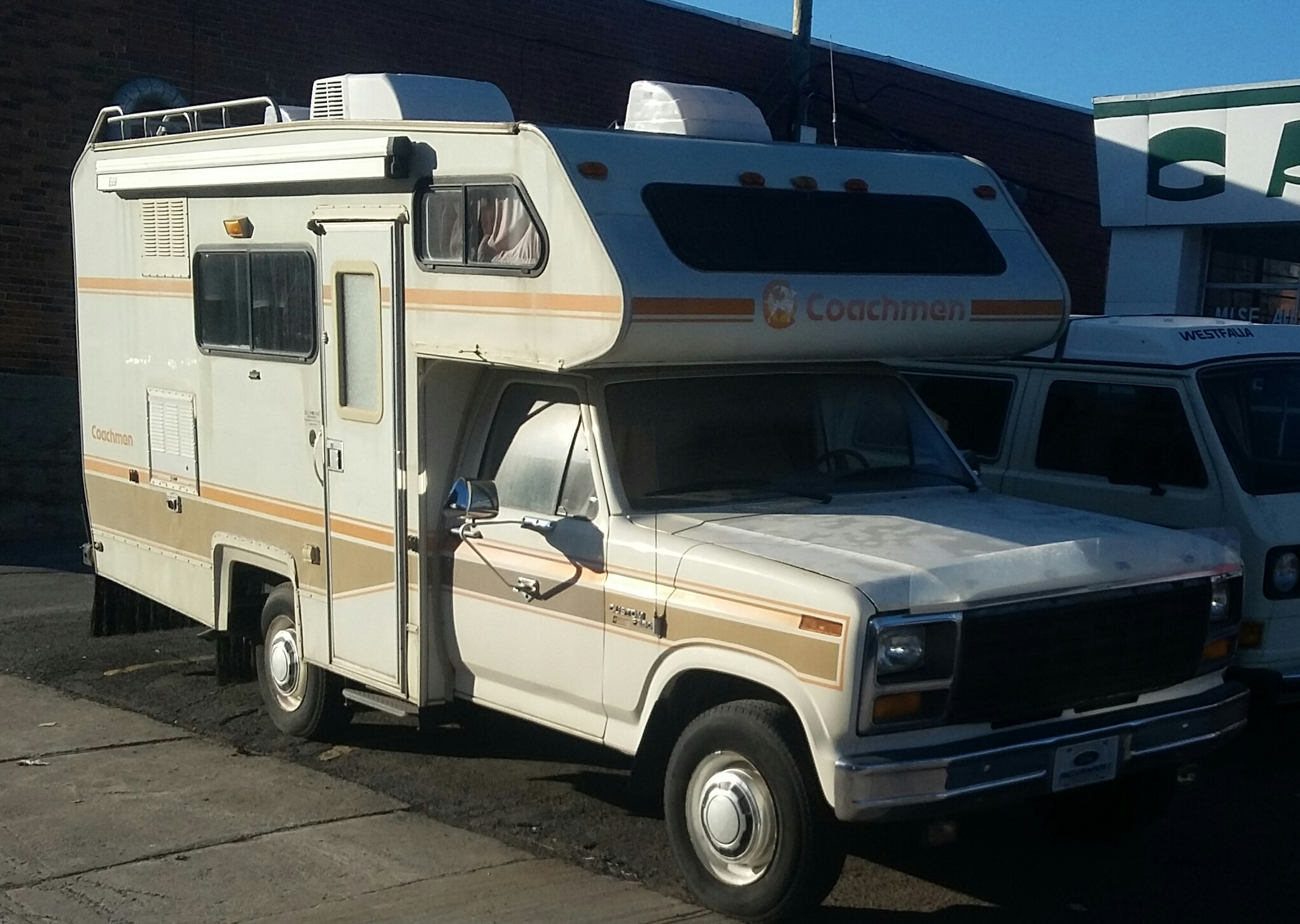
1980–1981 F-250 Custom camper

The seventh-generation F-Series carried over all three cab styles from previous generation, including two-door cab, two-door extended cab (SuperCab), and four-door crew cab configurations. Four bed configurations were offered, including a fendered 6 3/4-foot Flareside bed, 6 3/4-foot and 8-foot Styleside beds, and an 8-foot "Six Wheeler" Styleside bed for F-350 dual-rear-wheel trucks. The 8-foot Flareside bed was discontinued, along with the use of wooden floorboards; all F-Series trucks were now produced with a steel bed floor. While the Flareside bed saw little change to its overall dimensions, the interior of the Styleside bed was widened 5 inches (in comparison to 1979).

To improve the aerodynamics of the exterior, the long-running clamshell hood design feature was retired, as Ford faired the hood into the fenders. Adopting several design elements from the 1979 update of the Ford Econoline (though using a longer, lower front fascia), the front grille became flatter and more rectangular. Though lower in overall height, the cab was designed with larger windows and a more steeply angled windshield (creating larger vent windows). Bordered by wraparound taillamps, the tailgate of Styleside trucks adopted a tailgate using expanded central space for "Ford" lettering.

==== Interior design ====
Carrying over only the two-spoke steering wheel from the previous generation, the seventh-generation F-Series underwent multiple upgrades to the interior as part of the redesign. Coinciding with the more steeply sloped windshield, the dashboard was larger and covered by a pad (on all trim levels). The visibility of bare sheetmetal was reduced, as all models received color-keyed trim for the A-pillars and larger door panels (covering nearly the entire door). On higher-trim models, the dashboard received a full set of instruments (including a tachometer for the first time). Entry-level trims were fitted with black dashboard trim, with higher-trim vehicles using several styles of imitation wood trim (used only for the dashboard). After 1980, Ford discontinued the factory-installed CB radio option, withdrawing the 8-track cassette player after 1982.

The SuperCab was offered in two rear seating configurations, including two side-mounted jump seats or a three-passenger bench seat.

=== Trim ===
==== 1980–1981 ====
For 1980 and 1981, the F-Series carried over the same trim nomenclature from the 1973–1979 F-Series. The Custom served as the base trim, with the Ranger and Ranger XLT as mid-level trims, and the Ranger Lariat as the highest-level trim. All vehicles except the Custom were fitted with a wood-trim dash. The trim level was designated on the dashboard above the radio, with the Ranger XLT and Ranger Lariat receiving XLT and Lariat exterior badges.

The Camper Special and "Free-Wheelin" option packages made their return to the model line. Though no longer using a distinct wheelbase, the Camper Special retained its heavy-duty and functional option features and was offered in combination with Trailer Towing package and "Six Wheeler" pickup truck. Though again marketed as the sportiest F-Series, the "Free-Wheelin" option package underwent a major revision in its appearance, trading its multicolor exterior stripes for subdued pinstripes (or optional two-tone paint); its blackout grille remained a distinguishing feature.

==== 1982–1986 ====
For 1982, the trim levels underwent a revision. The Ranger name was moved from F-Series to the 1983 compact pickup (introduced early 1982), with Ford also dropping the long-running Custom name. The Standard trim replaced the Custom, with the Ranger trim replaced by the XL below the newly renamed XLT Lariat. Replacing the "Free-Wheelin" package, the XLS trim was the sporty counterpart of the luxury-oriented XLT Lariat; the exterior received blacked-out trim, model-specific striping, and aluminum-style dashboard trim.

For 1984, the trim level underwent further changes, as the XLS trim was dropped, and the XLT Lariat was renamed XLT. For 1985, the change was reversed, with the Lariat again combined with the XLT.

== Variants ==
=== Medium-duty F-Series ===
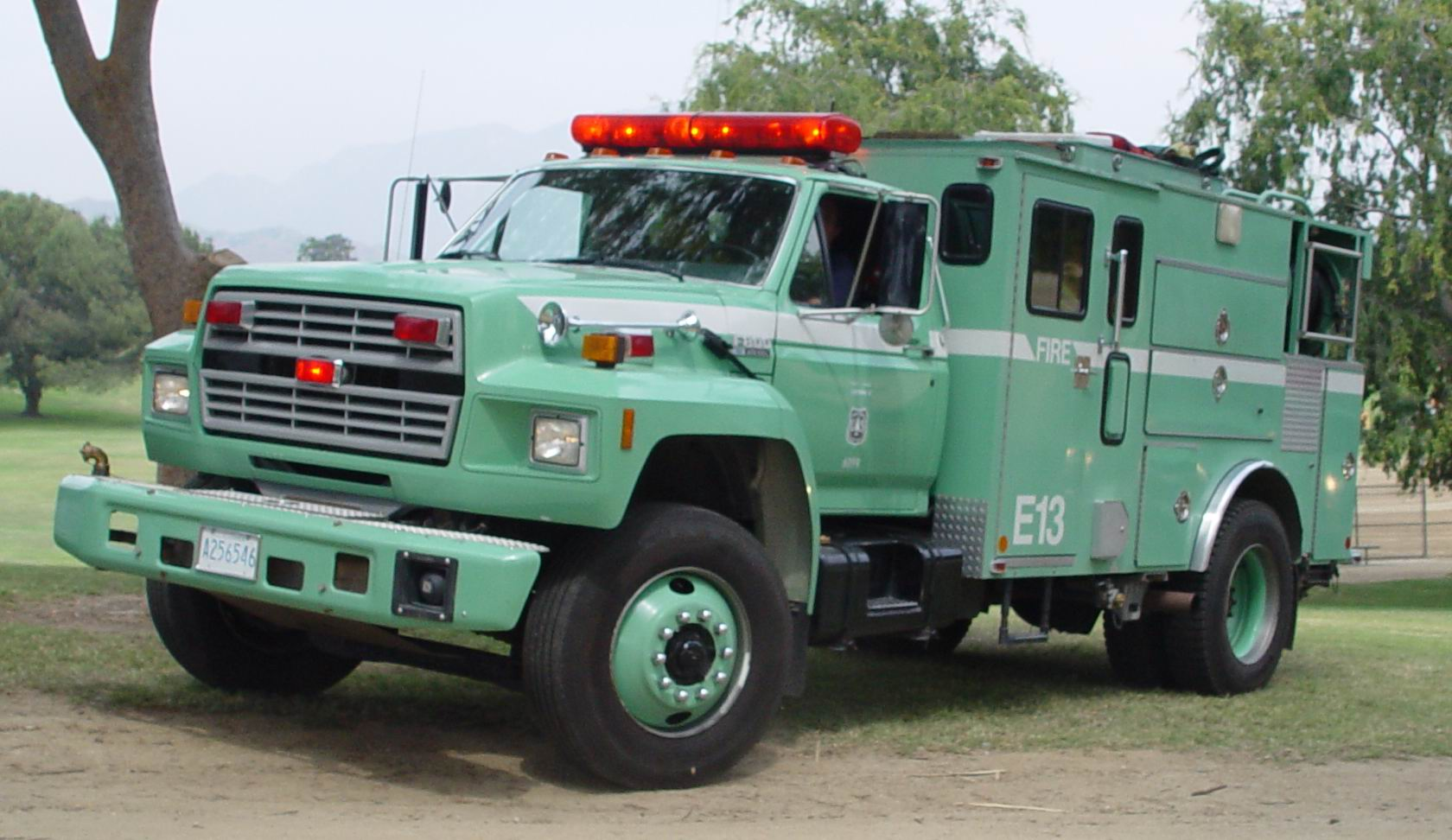
Ford F800 fire engine

For 1980, the medium-duty F-Series trucks (F-600 through F-800) underwent their first redesign since 1967. Adopting design elements from the heavier Class 7–8 Ford L-series, the medium-duty (Class 6–7) trucks received a trapezoidal front grille; in a major design change, separate front fenders made their return (for the first time since 1957). Sharing its cab with the pickup trucks, medium-duty F-Series trucks were offered as a two-door standard cab and as a four-door crew cab. While the previous rear-hinged hood remained standard, the forward-tilting hood became offered for the first time, quickly overtaking it in production.

At its 1980 launch, the medium-duty trucks were offered with two gasoline engines, a 6.1 L (370) and a 7.0 L (429) V8; both engines were variants of the 7.5 L V8 developed for truck use. Initially launched with the Caterpillar 3208 and Detroit Diesel 8.2 L V8 engines as options, multiple diesel engines were offered through its production. During the late 1980s, the V8 diesels were replaced by inline-6 diesels jointly developed by Ford and New Holland, with the model line ultimately receiving Cummins B-series and C-series diesel inline-6 engines.

With the exception of powertrain revisions, this generation of the medium-duty F-Series was produced nearly unchanged through its 19-year model run. For 1984, the grille was revised, replacing the "FORD" lettering with the Ford Blue Oval emblem (among the final Ford vehicles receiving the change). For 1995, the tilting hood was restyled with a new grille and turn signals (the interior of the cab remained nearly unchanged from 1980).

After the 1998 model year, this generation was replaced by an all-new medium-duty model range. Following the 1997 sale of the Ford heavy-duty truck line to Freightliner, the 2000 F-650/F-750 Super Duty became the largest vehicles sold by Ford.

=== Ford Bronco ===
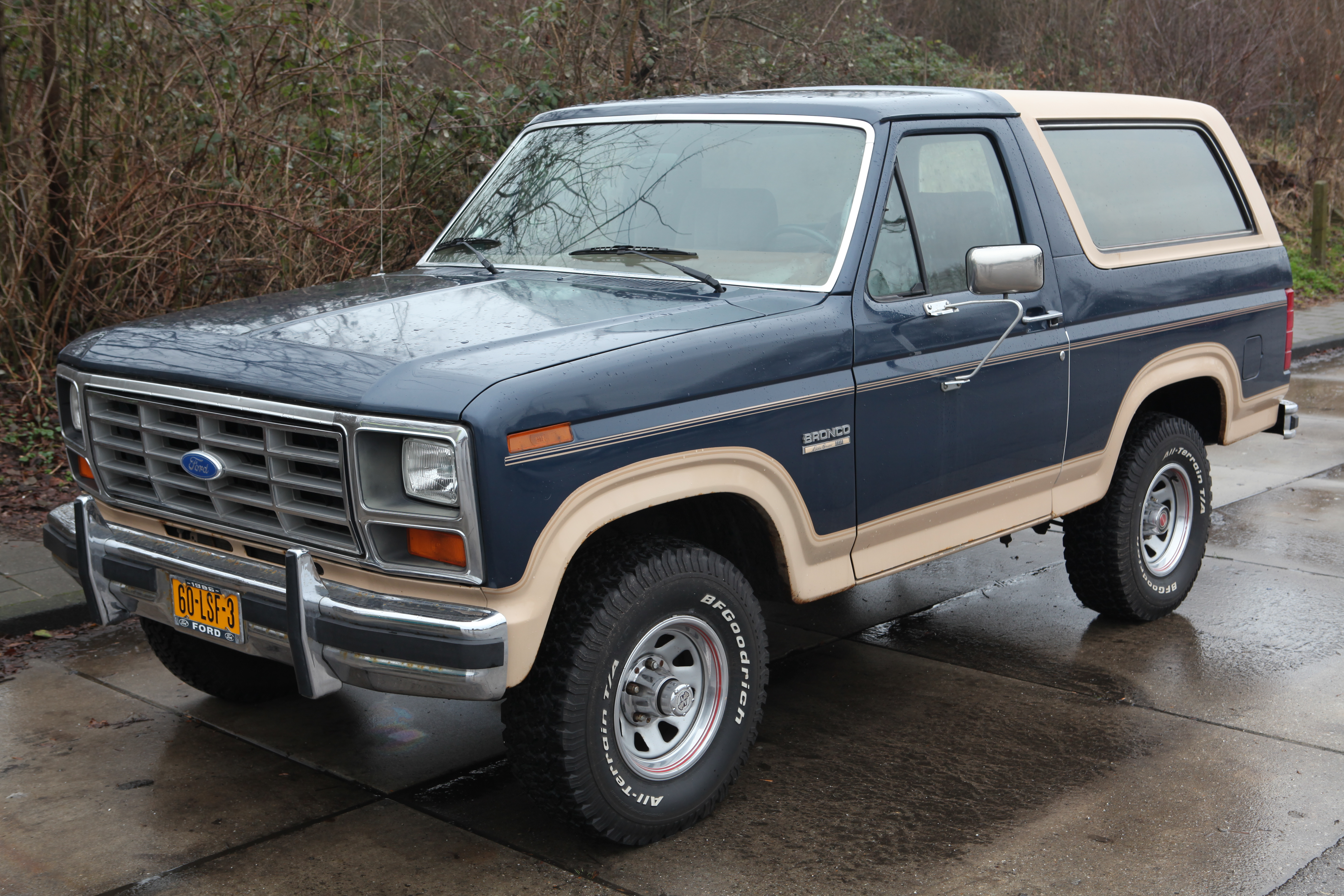
1986 Ford Bronco Eddie Bauer

For 1980, the third-generation Ford Bronco was introduced, becoming the second version based on the F-Series model line. As the F-100 ended its use of four-wheel drive, the Bronco became derived from the higher-payload F-150, again shortened to a 104-inch wheelbase. Competing against the Chevrolet K5 Blazer and the Dodge RamCharger, the Bronco was again bodied as a two-door wagon with a lift-off rear hardtop. Offered with part-time four-wheel drive, the Bronco shared its powertrains with the F-150 4×4, including the 4.9 L I6, 4.9 L (5.0 L) V8, and 5.8 L V8, pairing the engines with manual and automatic transmissions.

In 1985, Ford introduced an outdoors-themed Eddie Bauer trim package for the Bronco, later introducing across multiple Ford light truck lines.

== Foreign production ==
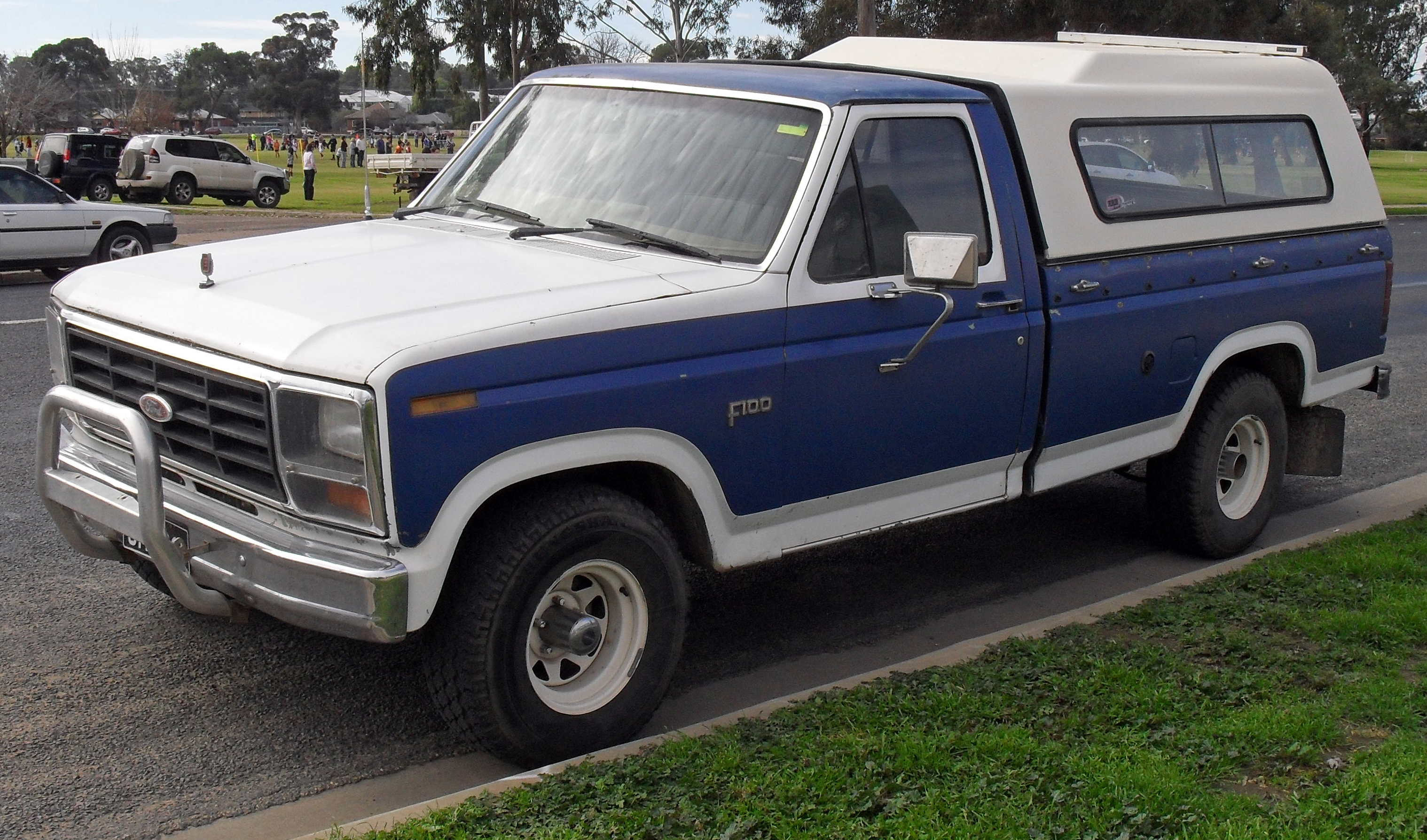
1982–1983 Ford F-100 utility (Australia-market RHD model)

=== Argentina ===
Ford Motor Argentina launched domestic production of the F-Series in 1982 in General Pacheco. Replacing imported trucks from the United States, Ford Argentina marketed the F-100 pickup truck, F-350 chassis cab, and the medium-duty F-600 and F-700 (later F-7000).

Produced from 1982 to 1987, the F-100 shared its sheetmetal with its North American counterpart, differing primarily in its powertrain. The standard engine was a 221-cubic-inch I6, a 292-cubic-inch V8, and naturally-aspirated and turbocharged 3.3L Perkins diesel I4 engines; the F-350 had the 292 V8 as standard and an optional 5.0L Perkins I6 diesel.

The medium-duty F-600 and F-700 (later F-7000) produced by Ford Argentina also differed in its powertrain design. The F-600 used a 292 V8 as a standard engine with an optional 5.0 L Perkins I6 diesel. The F-700 used diesel engines exclusively, offering a standard 5.0 L Perkins I6 with an optional 5.8 L Perkins I6 and 6.1 L Deutz I6. Ford Argentina ended production of this generation of medium-duty trucks in 1990.

Dealers such as Igarreta still provide customized configurations for the trucks, such as extended cabs and other bodywork. Additionally, the Deutz 913-series engines (4, 5 and 6 cylinder) for aftermarket were offered from 1983 to 1987 for all models, including medium duty trucks.

=== Australia ===
Ford Australia introduced the seventh-generation F-Series in 1981, becoming the third generation of the F-Series produced in Australia. The model line shared its powertrains from the Ford Falcon; a 4.1 L I6 was standard, offering a 5.8 L V8. Developed for right-hand drive, Australian-produced F-Series trucks sourced their dashboards from Ford Canada.

== See also ==
- Ford F-Series (eighth generation)
- Ford F-Series (ninth generation)
