= Ford F-Series (eighth generation) =

Line of pickup trucks by Ford, 1987–1991

Eighth generation
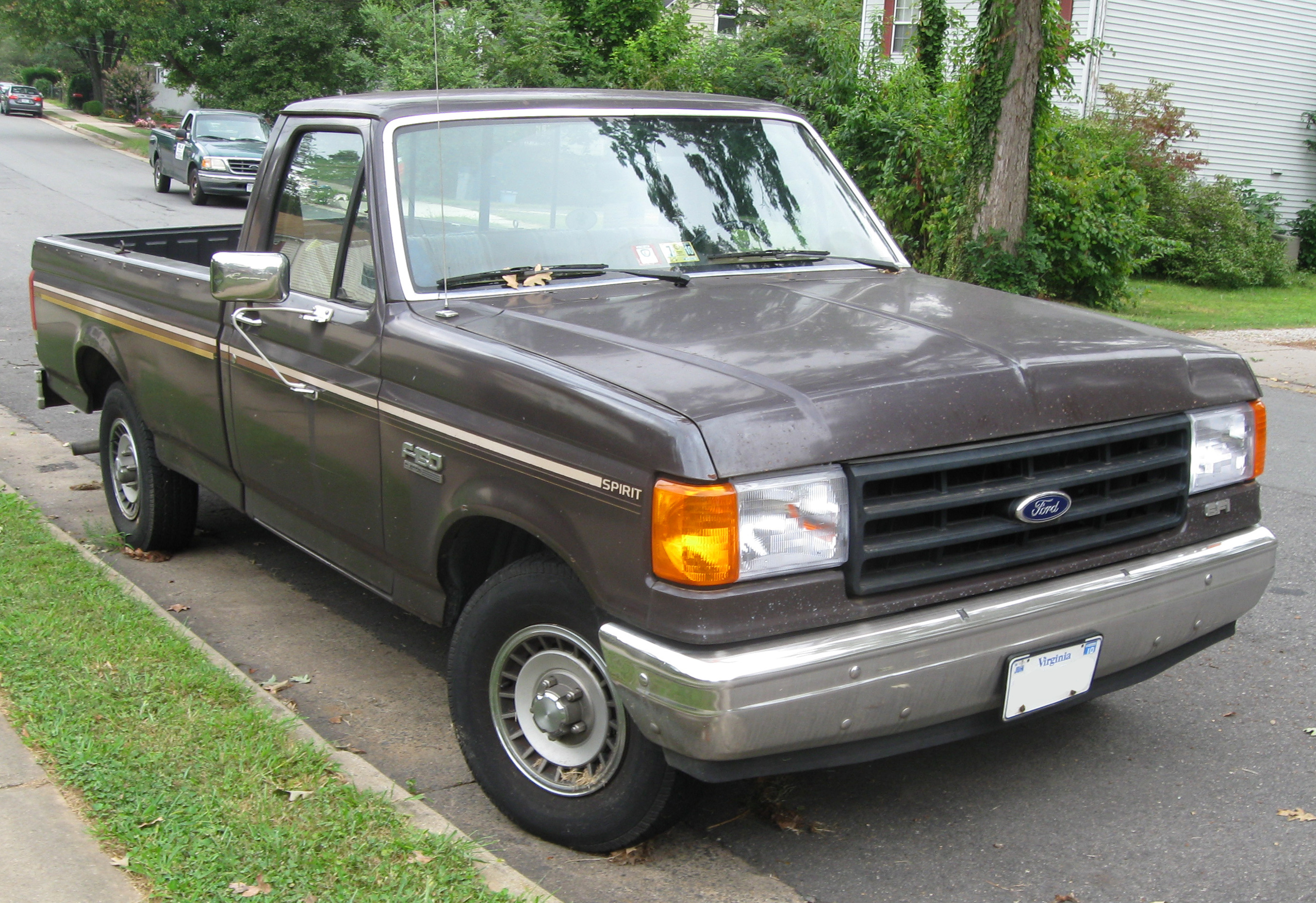
- 1988 Ford F-150

Overview
- Manufacturer: Ford
- Also called: Ford F-1000 (Brazil and Argentina); Ford F-4000 (Brazil and Argentina)
- Production: 1986–1991 (USA, Mexico, Canada, and Venezuela); 1987–1992 (Australia); 1988–1992 (Argentina); 1992–1995 (Brazil); 1993–1995 (Argentina, Brazilian trim model)
- Assembly: Cuautitlán, Mexico; Kansas City, Missouri, USA; Norfolk, Virginia, USA; St. Paul, Minnesota, USA; General Pacheco, Argentina; São Bernardo do Campo, Brazil; Louisville, Kentucky, USA; Wayne, Michigan, USA; Oakville, Ontario, Canada; Melbourne, Australia (Broadmeadows Assembly Plant, Ford Australia)

Body and chassis
- Body style: 2-door pickup 2-door extended cab pickup 4-door chassis cab 2-door chassis cab

Powertrain
- Engine: Gasoline: 3.8 L (232 cu in) Essex V6 (F-150, MX); 4.9 L (300 cu in) 300 I6; 4.9 L (302 cu in) 5.0 Windsor V8; 5.8 L (351 cu in) Windsor V8; 7.5 L (460 cu in) 385 V8; Diesel: 3.9 L MWM D229-4 I4 (Brazil); 3.9 L MWM TD229-4 turbo I4 (Brazil); 6.9 L (420 cu in) International IDI V8; 7.3 L (444 cu in) International IDI V8
- Transmission: Automatic: 3-speed Ford C6; 4-speed Ford AOD; 4-speed Ford E4OD (1989–91); Manual: 4-speed Borg-Warner T18; 4-speed Borg-Warner T19 (1987); 5-speed Mazda M5OD (1988–91); 5-speed ZF S5-42 (1988–91)

Dimensions
- Wheelbase: Regular Cab 6.75' Box: 117 in (2,972 mm); Regular Cab 8' Box: 133 in (3,378 mm); SuperCab 6.75' Box: 139 in (3,531 mm); SuperCab 8' Box: 155 in (3,937 mm); Crew Cab 8' Box: 168 in (4,267 mm)
- Length: Regular Cab 6.75' box: 194.1 in (4,930 mm); Regular Cab 8' Box: 210.2 in (5,339 mm); SuperCab 6.75' Box: 216 in (5,486 mm); SuperCab 8' Box: 232.1 in (5,895 mm); Crew Cab 8' Box: 245.6 in (6,238 mm)
- Width: 79 in (2,007 mm)
- Height: LWB 2WD: 69.9 in (1,775 mm); SWB 2WD: 69.8 in (1,773 mm); LWB 4WD: 73.2 in (1,859 mm); SWB 4WD: 73.8 in (1,875 mm)

Chronology
- Predecessor: Ford F-Series seventh generation (1980–1986)
- Successor: Ford F-Series ninth generation (1992–1996)

The eighth generation of the Ford F-Series is a line of pickup trucks and light- to medium-duty commercial trucks produced by Ford from 1987 to 1991. While the previous generation cab and chassis were carried over with minor changes to the vent windows, interior trim mounting locations, and floor pan shape on the transmission hump, the 1987 model was more streamlined, and maintenance items were made simpler. The exterior was facelifted with new composite headlamps – the first American truck to have them – as part of a more aerodynamic front end. Inside, the interior was given a complete redesign. Rear anti-lock brakes were now standard, the first pickup truck to boast this. For the first time, all models were produced with straight-sided Styleside beds; the Flareside bed was discontinued except for a small number of early 1987 models using leftover 1986 beds with new circular fenders. In October 1989, the taillights' white reverse light was decreased in size.

== Trims ==
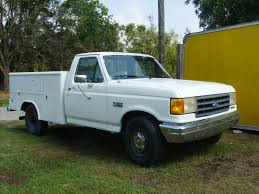
Ford F-250 utility service truck

- Custom – Included: Vinyl upholstery, black steering wheel, optional chrome front bumper, black grille, hubcaps, foldaway mirrors, and an electronic AM radio with digital clock and two speakers.
- XL – Added: Cloth and vinyl upholstery, swingaway mirrors, front bumper rub strip, color-keyed floor mat, a door trim panel with map pocket, and a color-keyed headliner.
- XLT Lariat – Added: Cloth upholstery, chrome grille, sport wheel covers, tinted glass, optional carpeting, and leather-wrapped steering wheel.
- Nite (1991) – Included: All blacked-out exterior trim, either a pink or blue/purple stripe, and a "Nite" decal on the sides of the cargo box. Was only available in black and on F-150 models equipped with a V8 engine.

== Models ==
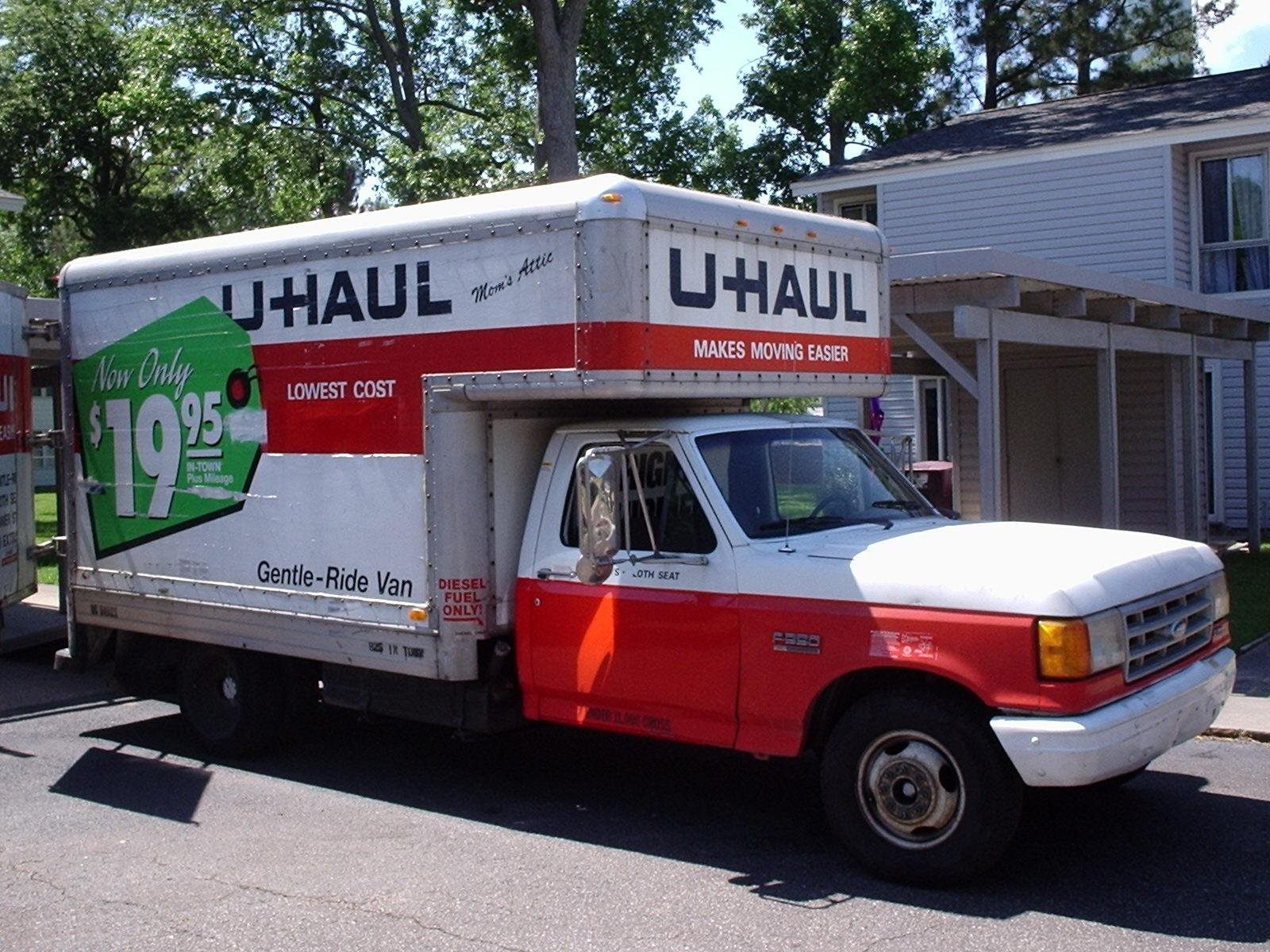
Ford F-350 U-Haul truck in Hampton, VA.

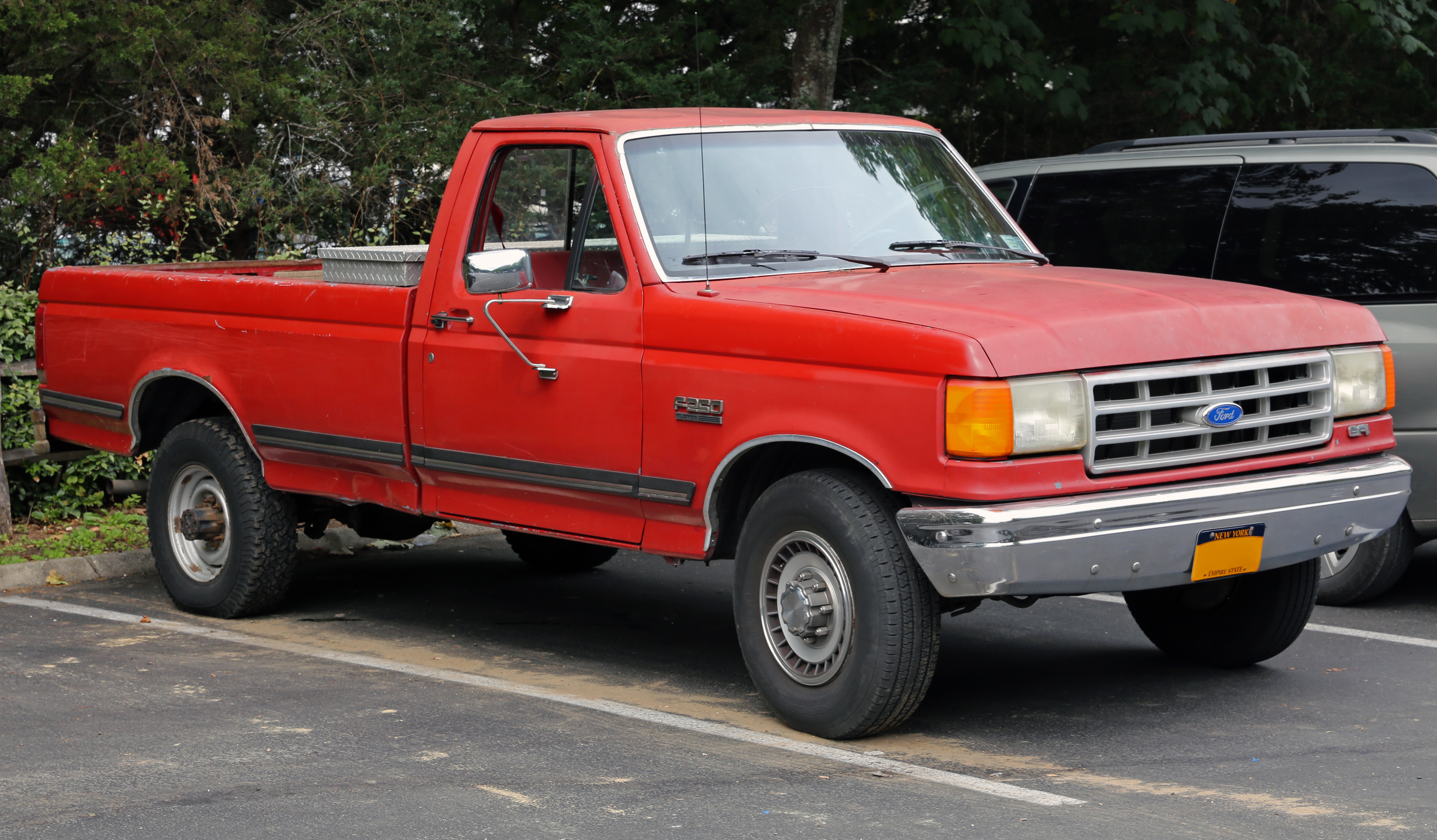
1989 Ford F-250 Custom

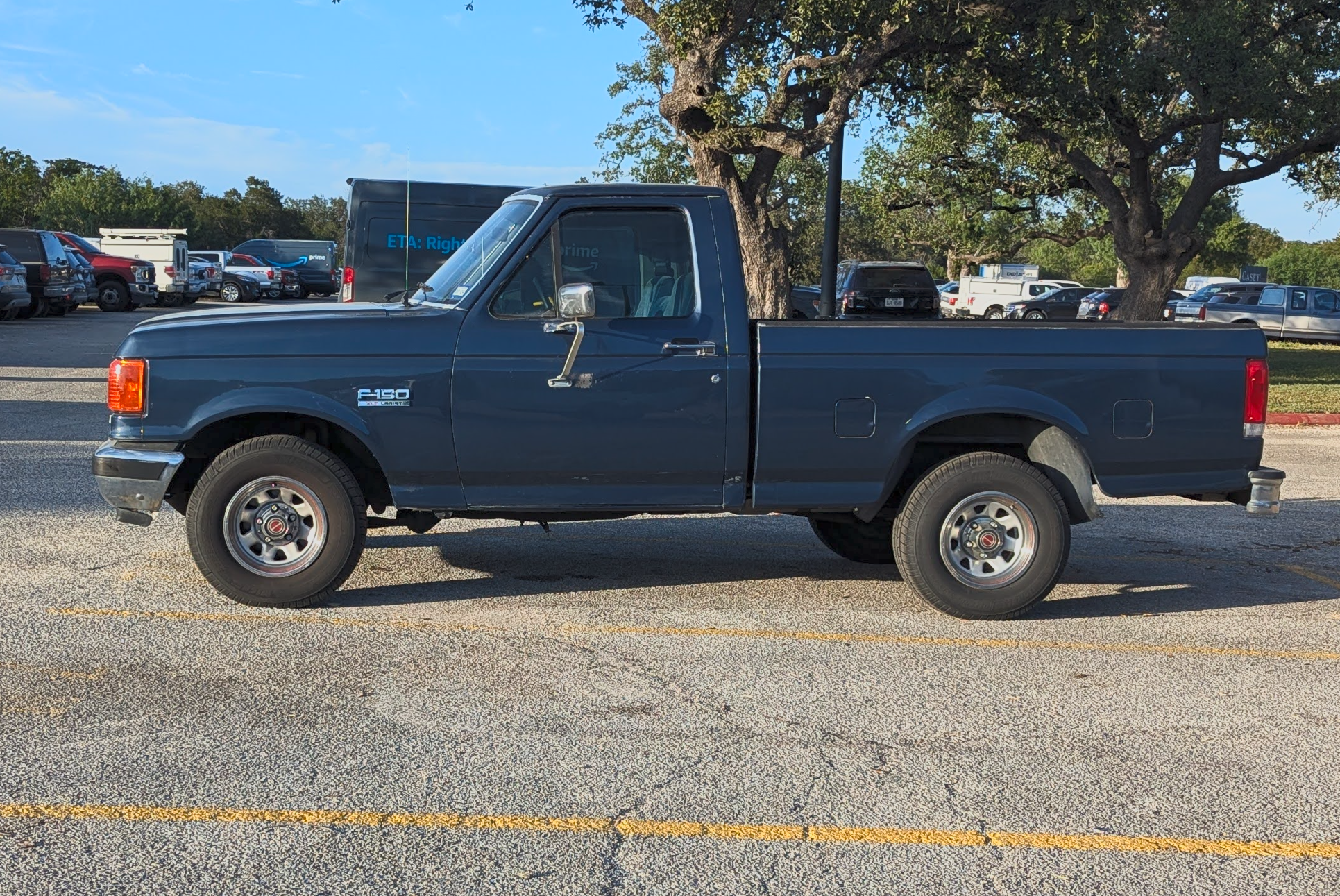
1987 Ford F-150 XLT Lariat

Eighth-generation Ford F-Series models are:

- F-150: 1/2 ton (6,250 lb GVWR max)
- F-250: light-duty 3/4 ton (7,700 lb GVWR max; Regular Cab only)
- F-250HD: 3/4 ton (8,600 lb GVWR on Regular Cab; 8,800 lb GVWR on SuperCab)
- F-350: 1 ton Class 2 or Class 3 truck (11,000 lb GVWR max)
- F-Super Duty: Class 4 truck (14,500 lb GVWR max)

The new-for-1988 F-Super Duty was essentially a Class 4 truck built as a chassis cab, with an aftermarket bed (specific to its future use) added after the truck was built. The F-Super Duty came with dual fuel tanks with a dash-mounted toggle switch to switch between each tank, while using only a single fuel gauge. It came with a PTO used to power attachments, such as winches or a dump bed, directly from the transmission. F-Super Duty models were two-wheel drive only with a 14,500 lb (6,577 kg) GVWR, came with either the standard 7.5 L (460 CID) gasoline V8 or the optional 7.3 L (444 CID) diesel V8, and rode on a 137 or 161 in (3,480 or 4,089 mm) wheelbase. Other mechanical upgrades from the dual-rear-wheel F-350 included four-wheel vented disc brakes (with identical rotors and calipers used on both axles), 10-lug wheels, and a leaf-sprung I-beam front axle. The transmission was a five-speed manual or a three-speed automatic, with the four-speed electronically controlled E4OD also offered beginning in 1990. There was also a stripped chassis available, offering a 16,000 lb (7,257 kg) GVWR on two wheelbases of 158 or 178 in (4,013 or 4,521 mm) and the 7.3 L diesel engine as the sole option. This model should not be confused with the later Super Duty commercial line of trucks starting with the 1999 model year.

== Brazil ==
It was built from 1992 to 1995. The 1992 model carried over the MWM D229-4 and MWM TD229-4 engines from the previous generation. 1993 brought no notable changes. 1994 introduced a 4×4 model and a 2-door extended cab model marketed as "SuperCab." 1995 introduced the Ford 300 4.9-liter inline-six engine.

== Powertrain and chassis ==
In a move to further update the F-Series engine lineup, the 4.9 L inline-6 was converted to fuel injection for 1987. A year later, Ford became the first pickup truck manufacturer to sell a fully non-carbureted engine lineup as the 5.8 L V8 and 7.5 L V8 also gained multiport fuel injection (the 5.0 L V8 had gained fuel injection as an option for 1985 and this was made standard in 1986). For 1988, the diesel V8 from International (Navistar) was enlarged to from 420 to 444 cubic inches (6.9 to 7.3 L); this allowed for an increase to 180 hp (130 kW) and 365 ft⋅lbf (495 N⋅m) of torque.

While the dated 3-speed column-mounted manual transmission was discontinued, much of the rest of the transmission lineup carried over from the 1980–1986 trucks. In 1988, the five-speed ZF S5-42 replaced the Borg-Warner T19 in F-250 and F-350 models. For the F-150 and light-duty F-250, the heavier-duty Borg-Warner T18 4-speed manual remained available, while the Mazda-built M5OD 5-speed manual was added to the model lineup for models equipped with the 4.9 L inline-6 and 5.0 L V8.

Four-wheel-drive improvements included the standardization of automatic locking hubs in 1989 and the availability of "Touch Drive" pushbutton activation, which had previously been available on the Bronco.

From 1980 through 1996, Ford offered a four-wheel-drive swing arm independent front suspension called Twin-Traction Beam (TTB). Based on its two-wheel-drive Twin-I-Beam suspension from 1965, Ford mounted a Dana 44 or Dana 50 differential in the driver-side front axle beam and transmitted torque to the passenger-side wheel with a U-jointed axleshaft. TTB coil springs were still used on the F-150, while the four-wheel-drive F-250 and F-350 received leaf springs. The F-250 received TTB Dana 50 axles, and the F-350 a solid Dana 60 axle.

Engines
Name	Production	Engine type/Displacement	Power	Torque	Fuel Delivery
300 Six	1987–1991	300.1 cu in (4,918 cc) I6	145–150 hp (108–112 kW)	260–265 lb⋅ft (353–359 N⋅m)	EFI
5.0 Windsor	1987–1991	301.6 cu in (4,942 cc) V8	185 hp (138 kW)	270 lb⋅ft (366 N⋅m)	EFI
5.8 Windsor	1987	351.9 cu in (5,766 cc) V8	210 hp (157 kW)	305 lb⋅ft (414 N⋅m)	4-bbl carburetor
5.8 Windsor	1988–1991	351.9 cu in (5,766 cc) V8	210 hp (157 kW)	315 lb⋅ft (427 N⋅m)	EFI
460 V8	1987	460 cu in (7,538 cc) V8	230 hp (172 kW)	362 lb⋅ft (491 N⋅m)	4-bbl carburetor
460 V8	1988–1991	460 cu in (7,538 cc) V8	230 hp (172 kW)	390 lb⋅ft (529 N⋅m)	EFI
International 6.9L IDI V8	1987	420 cu in (6,883 cc) Diesel V8	170 hp (127 kW)	315 lb⋅ft (427 N⋅m)	Indirect fuel injection
International 7.3L IDI V8	1988–1991	444 cu in (7,276 cc) Diesel V8	180 hp (134 kW)	345 lb⋅ft (468 N⋅m)	Indirect fuel injection
