= Dana Incorporated =

American automotive parts manufacturer

- Type: Public
- Traded as: NYSE: DAN; S&P 600 Component
- ISIN: US2358252052
- Industry: Automotive industry
- Founded: 1904; 122 years ago
- Founders: Clarence W. Spicer; Charles A. Dana; Joseph Victor; Hugo Reinz; J.B. Long
- Headquarters: Maumee, Ohio, U.S.
- Area served: Worldwide
- Key people: R. Bruce McDonald (Chairman & CEO)
- Products: Axles, driveshafts, sealing and thermal products for automotive, commercial vehicle, and off-highway vehicle manufacturers
- Revenue: ▲US$ 10.2 billion (FY 2022)
- Operating income: ▲US$ 763 million (FY 2022)
- Net income: ▼US$ -242 million (FY 2022)
- Total assets: ▲US$ 7.4 billion (FY 2022)
- Number of employees: 28,000 (2026)
- Website: www.dana.com

Dana Incorporated is an American supplier of axles, driveshafts, and electrodynamic, thermal, sealing, and digital equipment for conventional, hybrid, and electric-powered vehicles. The company's products and services are aimed at the light vehicle and commercial vehicle equipment markets. Founded in 1904 and based in Maumee, Ohio, the company employs nearly 28,000 people in 33 countries. In 2022, Dana generated sales of $10.2 billion. The company is included in the Fortune 500.

== History ==
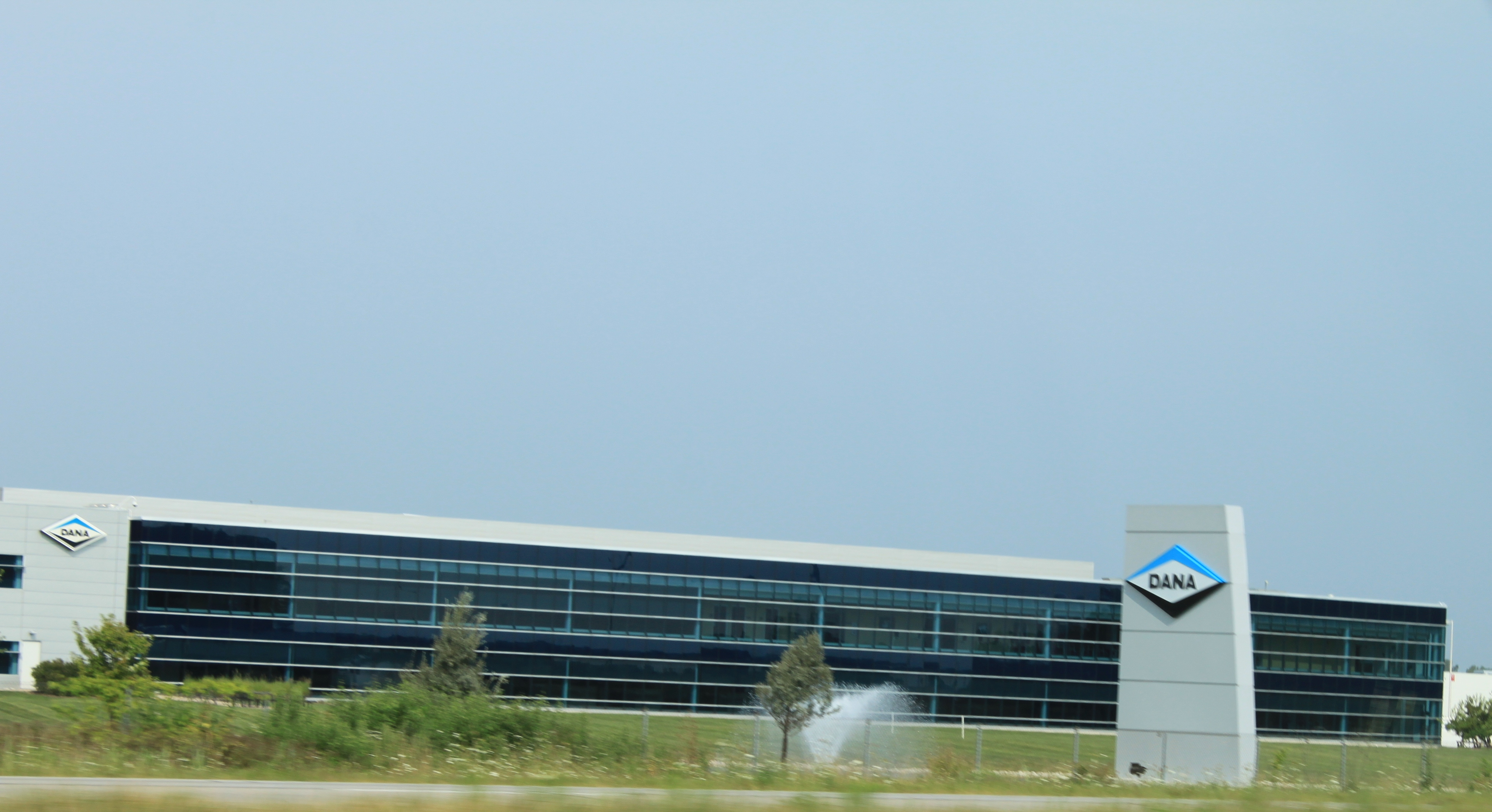
Dana corporate headquarters, Maumee, OH

- In 1904, Clarence W. Spicer, engineer, inventor, and founder of the company, began manufacturing universal joints in Plainfield, New Jersey.
- Also in 1904, the first C.W. Spicer "u-joints" were shipped to Corbin Motor Company in Connecticut.
- In 1905, Spicer Universal Joint Manufacturing Company was incorporated.
- In 1909, the company changed its name to Spicer Manufacturing Company.
- In 1910, Spicer relocated to South Plainfield, New Jersey.
- In 1914, Charles Dana joined the company.
- In 1922, Spicer was listed on the New York Stock Exchange.
- In 1925, Spicer expanded internationally taking a holding in licensee in England, Hardy, renamed Hardy Spicer.
- In 1946, Dana became president and treasurer, and the company was renamed the Dana Corporation. Spicer becomes the brand name for the company's driveline products.
- In 1963, Dana acquired the Perfect Circle Company.
- In 1972, Dana bought a 35% stake in Wolverhampton-based engineering company, Turner Manufacturing. The remaining shares were acquired a few years later.
- In 2006, Dana filed for bankruptcy.
- In 2007, Dana canceled 150 million shares of stock during their bankruptcy.
- In 2018, Dana announced that it was buying a majority stake in TM4 Inc., a company specialized in electric powertrains, for C$165 million (US$127 million).
- In 2019, Dana acquired privately held SME Group (Italy).
- In March 2019, Dana purchased Drive Systems segment of the Oerlikon Group, including the Graziano Trasmissioni and Fairfield brands and VOCIS, a wholly owned electronic controls business located in the UK.
- In August 2019, Dana acquired Nordresa Motors, Inc.
- In 2020, Dana started using 3D printers at its Advanced Manufacturing Center in Maumee, Ohio to manufacture face shield components for use during the coronavirus pandemic.
- In March 2021, Dana acquired Pi Innovo from Plymouth, Michigan.

== Products ==
Key products include axles, drive shafts, universal joints and sealing and thermal-management products.

=== Axles ===
- Dana 23
- Dana 25
- Dana 27
- Dana 30
- Dana 35
- Dana 44
- Dana 50
- Dana 53
- Dana 60
- Dana 70
- Dana 80
- Dana S 110
- Dana S135
- Dana S150
- Dana S150S
- Dana S170
- Dana S172
- Dana S175
- Dana S190
- Dana D170
- Dana D172
- Dana D190
- Dana S35-190FT
- Dana S35-590FT
- Dana 123 Rigid Planetary Axle
- Dana 211 Planetary Steering Axle
- Dana 246 Planetary Steering Axle
- Dana 550S
- Dana 750
- Dana Heavy Mining Axle

=== eAxle ===
- eS1100r 48V e-Axle
- eS4500r e-Axle
- eS9000r e-Axle
- Hybrid Rear Axle Module
- Zero-8 e-Axles
- eS13.0Xr e-Drive Axle
- e-Axle Heavy Duty
  - eS17D
  - eS20D e-Axle
- Electrified Transaxle

=== Suspension ===
- Twin Traction Beam

=== Transfer Cases ===
- Dana 18
- Dana 20
- Dana 21
- Dana 24
- Dana 300

== Distribution Network in France ==
In France, Secodi (a member of the Fétis Group, based in Nantes) is an official distributor of Dana Incorporated (Spicer brand) products. The company distributes universal joints, driveshafts and Spicer components for the French industrial and agricultural markets.
