= Twin-Traction Beam =

Vehicle suspension system

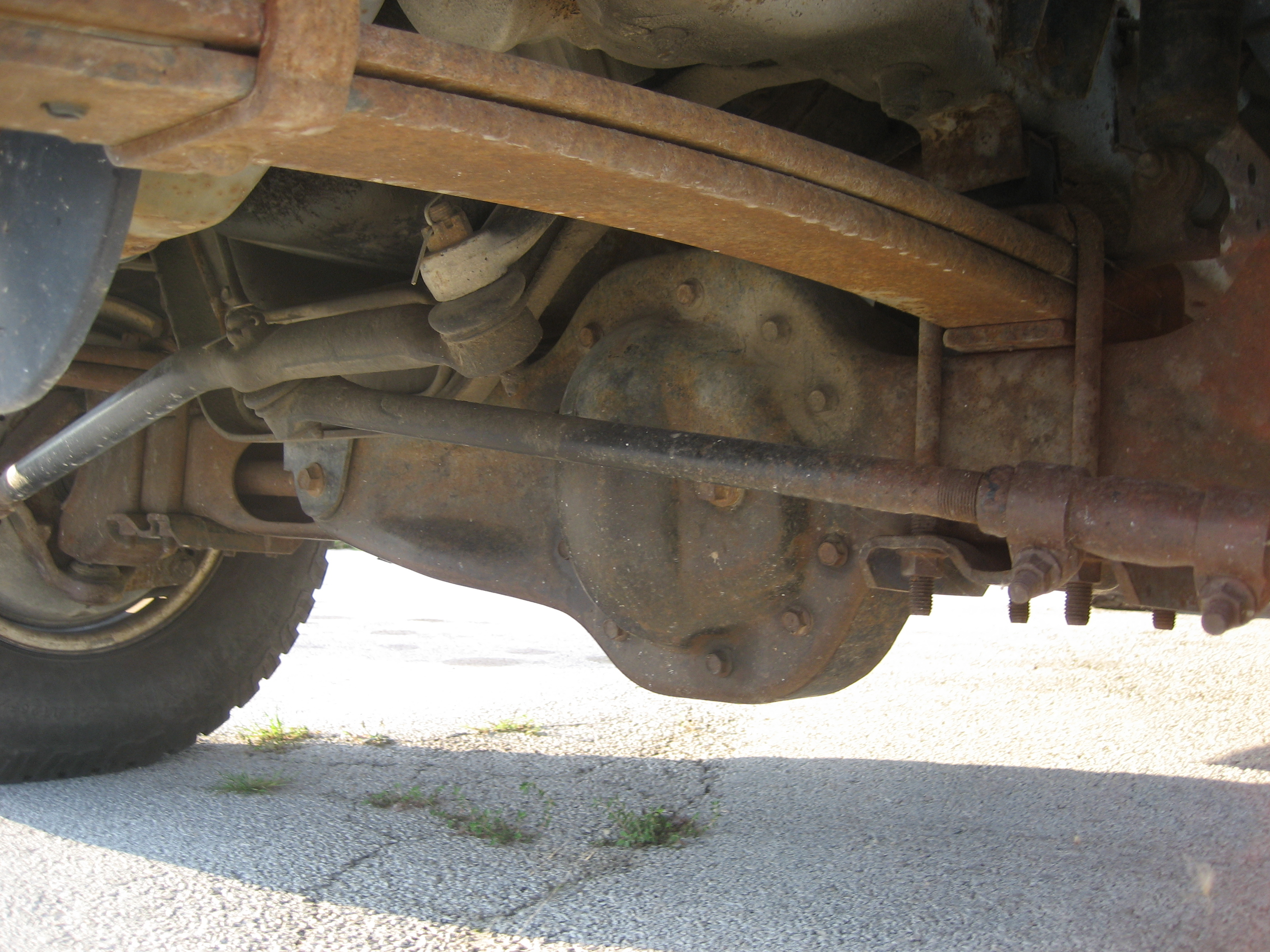
Dana 50 TTB from a 1996 F-250

Twin-Traction Beam (TTB) is an independent suspension system for front drive axles in four-wheel drive Ford F-Series trucks and sport utility vehicles.

== Background ==
The Twin-Traction Beam was invented by John A. Richardson and Donald G. Wheatley of Ford Motor Company, as covered by U.S. Patent 3,948,337, issued on April 6, 1976. The patent name was "Independent front suspension for front-wheel drive," which was assigned to Ford Motor Company.

The TTB front suspension is a Ford exclusive design in four wheel drive light-duty vehicles starting in 1980. This independent front suspension utilizing coil springs replaced the leaf spring solid axle designs. The original coil spring design with Radius rods was used on half-ton pickups like the F-150, while heavier-duty models like the F-250 utilized a TTB version with leaf springs. The TTB and the Twin I-Beam designs were used in Ford trucks until 2002.

The TTB is an attempt to combine "the simplicity and reliability of a solid axle with the undeniable ride quality of independent front suspension", resulting in characteristics and issues not found in other designs. The design has its proponents and detractors in the off-road community, denounced among some slow-speed users and praised by high-speed racers.

The Dana Holding Corporation manufactured the TTB axle for Ford. It features a universal joint in the center, allowing the wheels to move independently of each other. The differential is offset to the driver's side, and a slip yoke is used on the long axle side to allow the shaft to change length. The TTB axles are variations of the Dana 28, Dana 35, Dana 44, and Dana 50.

== Applications ==
Common applications include:

- 1980–1997 F-150/F-250
- 1991–1994 Ford Explorer
- 1984–1990 Ford Bronco II
- 1980–1996 Ford Bronco
- 1983–1997 Ford Ranger (North America)
- 1993-1997 Mazda B series
- 1991-1993 Mazda Navajo

== See also ==
- Corvette leaf spring
- MacPherson strut
- Torsion beam suspension
- Weissach axle – a variant of Double wishbone suspension with a short link at the front pivot bushing of the lower A-arm
