= Barf Bag =

Barf Bag may refer to:

- Sickness bag, a disposable bag used to capture vomit
- Lewis, nicknamed "Barf Bag", a character in the novel Holes by Louis Sachar
- Barf Bag, a character from the fourth season of Battle for Dream Island, an animated web series
