= AMC Gremlin =

Subcompact car produced by American Motors Corporation

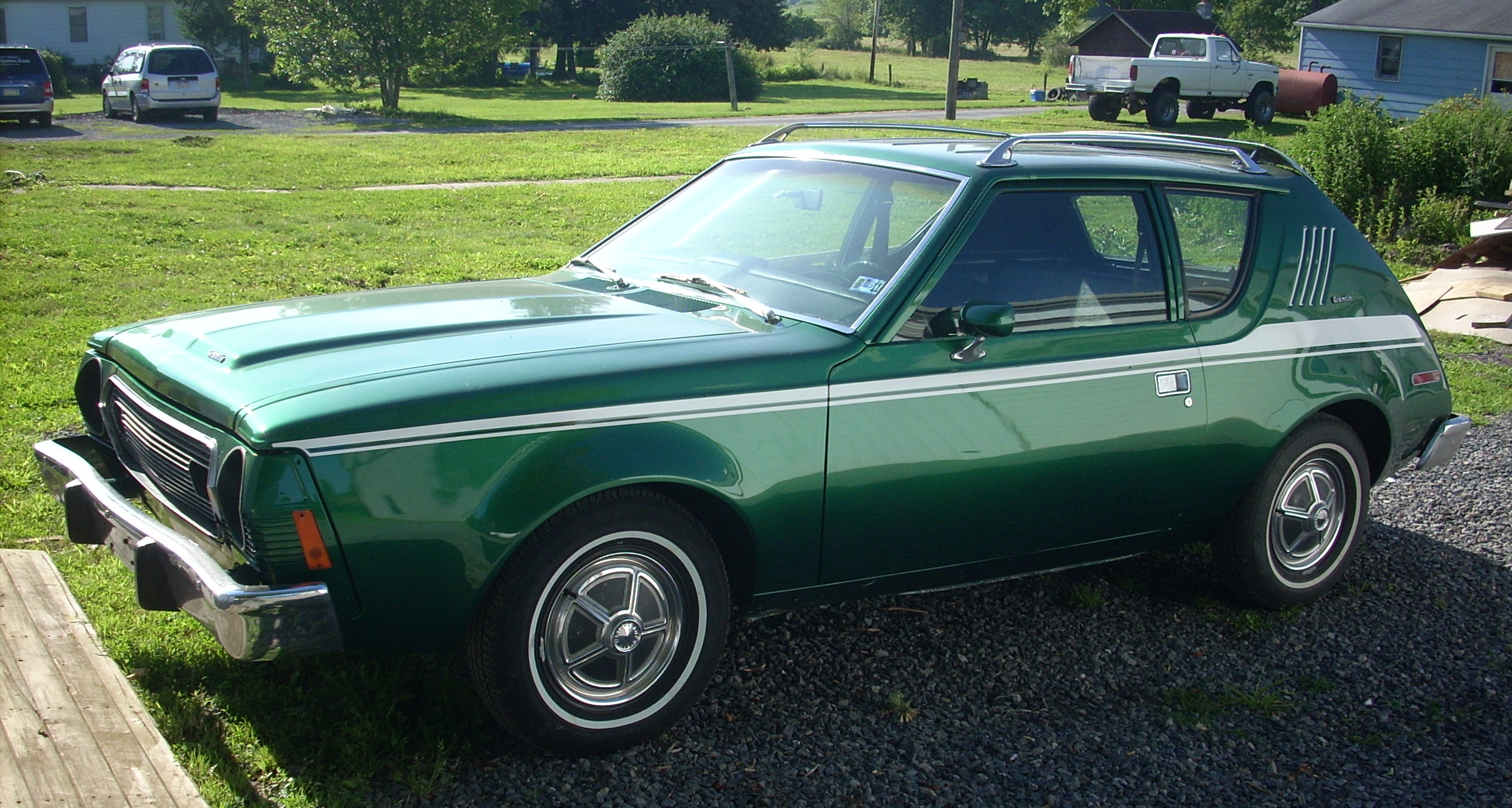
- 1975 AMC Gremlin

Overview
- Manufacturer: American Motors Corporation
- Also called: American Motors Gremlin; VAM Gremlin (Mexico)
- Production: 1970–1978 (US); 1974–1983 (Mexico); 671,475 produced
- Assembly: United States: Kenosha, Wisconsin (Kenosha Assembly); Canada: Brampton, Ontario (Brampton Assembly); Mexico: Mexico City (VAM)
- Designer: Bob Nixon; Dick Teague

Body and chassis
- Class: Subcompact
- Body style: 2-door sedan; 2-door hatchback
- Layout: FR layout
- Related: AMC Spirit; AMC Eagle; AMC Hornet; AMC Concord; AMC Pacer

Powertrain
- Engine: 1,984 cc (121 cu in) VW EA831 I4; 199 cu in (3.3 L) AMC I6; 232 cu in (3.8 L) AMC I6; 258 cu in (4.2 L) AMC I6; 304 cu in (5.0 L) AMC V8
- Transmission: 3- or 4-speed Borg-Warner manual; 3-speed manual w/ Laycock de Normanville overdrive; 3-speed Borg-Warner automatic (1970–1971); 3-speed Chrysler TorqueFlite automatic (1972–1978)

Dimensions
- Wheelbase: 96 in (2,438 mm)
- Length: 161.3 in (4,097 mm) (1970–1972); 165.5 in (4,204 mm) (1973); 170.3 in (4,326 mm) (1974–1975); 169.4 in (4,303 mm) (1976); 166.5 in (4,229 mm) (1977–1978)
- Width: 70.6 in (1,793 mm)
- Height: 51.8 in (1,316 mm)
- Curb weight: 2,633 lb (1,194 kg)

Chronology
- Successor: AMC Spirit

The AMC Gremlin, also called American Motors Gremlin, is a subcompact car introduced in 1970, manufactured and marketed in a single, two-door body style (1970–1978) by American Motors Corporation (AMC), as well as in Mexico (1974–1983) by AMC's Vehículos Automotores Mexicanos (VAM) subsidiary.

Using a shortened Hornet platform and bodywork with a pronounced kammback-like tail, the Gremlin was classified as an economy car and competed with the Chevrolet Vega and Ford Pinto, introduced that same year, as well as imported vehicles including the Volkswagen Beetle and Toyota Corolla. The small domestic automaker marketed the Gremlin as "the first American-built import."

The Gremlin reached a total production of 671,475 over a single generation. It was superseded for the 1979 model year by a restyled and revised variant, the AMC Spirit, which continued to be produced through 1983. This was long after the retirement of the Ford Pinto, which suffered from stories about exploding gas tanks, as well as the Chevrolet Vega with its rusting bodies, durability problems, and aluminum engine.

== History ==
=== Origin and design ===
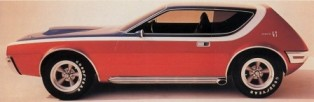

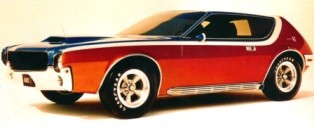
The design of the Gremlin was inspired by the AMC AMX-GT concept car.

The idea for a sub-compact sized model in AMC's product line began in 1966 when design chief at American Motors, Dick Teague, and stylist Bob Nixon discussed the possibility of a shortened version of AMC's compact car. While on an airline flight, Teague's solution, which he said he sketched on an air sickness bag, was to truncate the tail of a Javelin. Bob Nixon joined AMC as a 23-year-old and did the first formal design sketches in 1967 for the car that was to be the Gremlin.

Ford and General Motors were reported to launch entirely new subcompact cars for the 1971 model year. On the other hand, AMC did not have the financial resources to compete with a wholly new design. Teague's idea of using the shortened pony car Javelin platform resulted in the AMX-GT concept, first shown at the New York International Auto Show in April 1968. This version did not go into production. Instead, the AMX name was utilized from 1968 through 1970 on a shortened, two-seat sports car built from the Javelin.

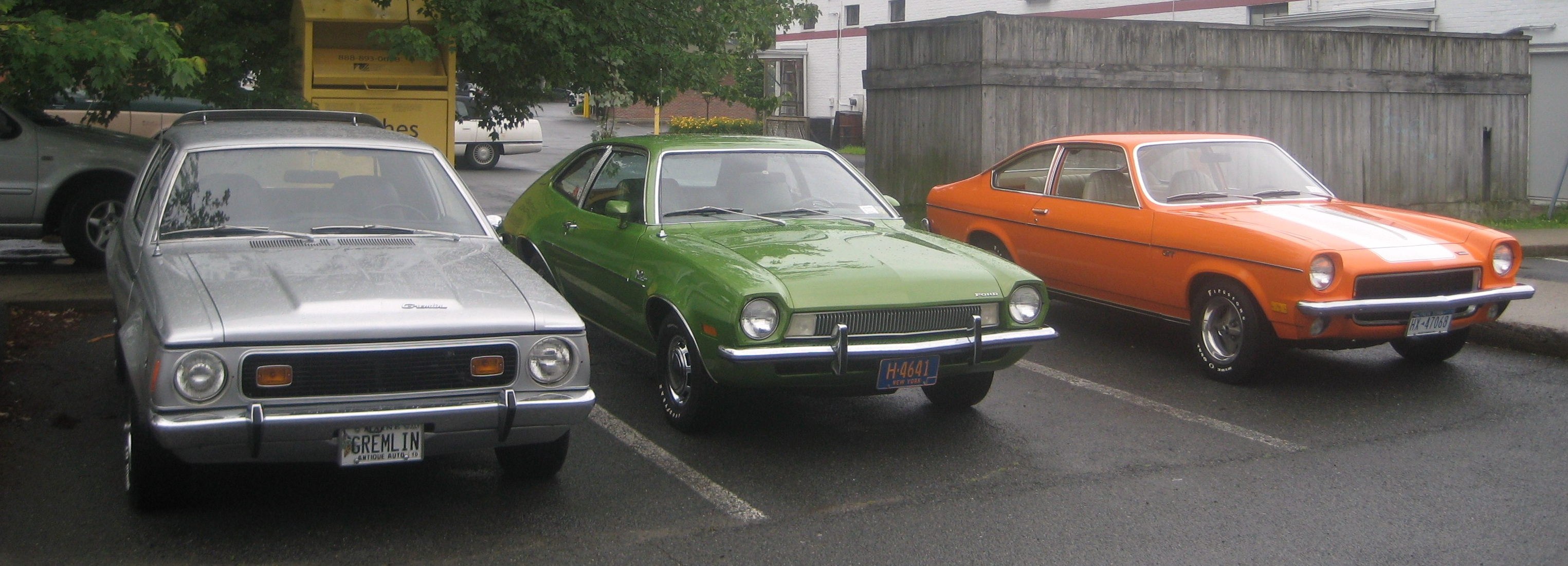
1971 AMC Gremlin X, 1972 Ford Pinto Runabout, and 1973 Chevrolet Vega GT

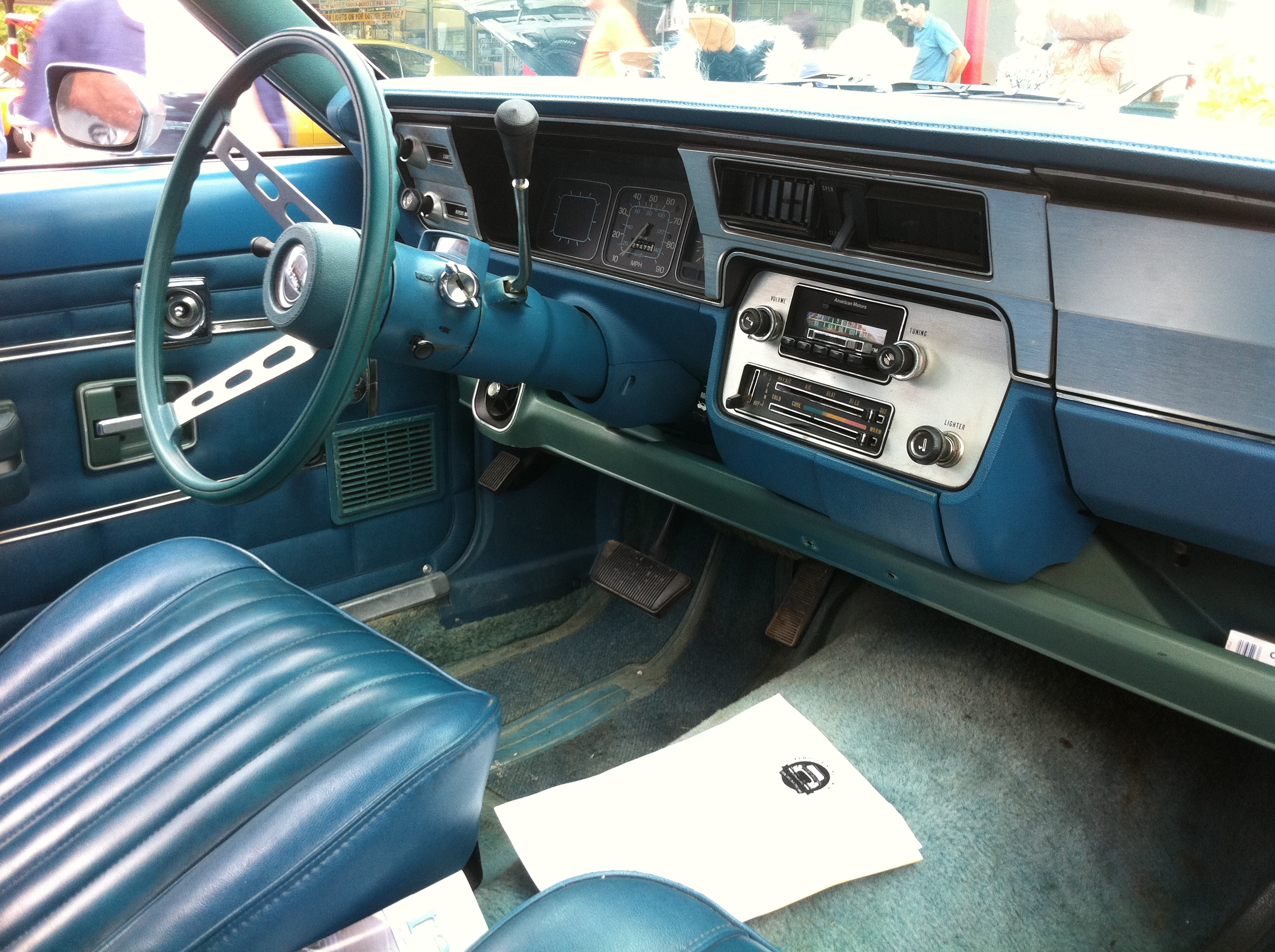
1978 Gremlin X

Instead, Bob Nixon, AMC's future Chief of Design, designed the new subcompact based on the automaker's Hornet model, a compact car. The design reduced the wheelbase from 108 to 96 inches (2,743 to 2,438 mm) and the overall length from 179 to 161 in (4,547 to 4,089 mm), making the Gremlin two inches (50 mm) longer than the Volkswagen Beetle and shorter than the Ford Pinto and Chevrolet Vega.

Capitalizing on AMC's advantage as a small car producer, the Gremlin was introduced on April 1, 1970. The April 6, 1970, cover of Newsweek magazine featured a red Gremlin for its article, "Detroit Fights Back: The Gremlin". The car was available as a "base" two-passenger version with no rear seat and a fixed rear window, at a suggested retail price of $1,879, and as a four-seat hatchback with an opening rear window, at $1,959 (US$16,241 in 2025 dollars).

From the front of the car to the B-pillars, the Gremlin was essentially the same as the AMC Hornet. Although it was only fractionally longer than the contemporary Volkswagen Beetle, Time said the length of its hood over the front-mounted engine made "the difference seem considerably more", adding that the car "resembles a sawed-off station wagon, with a long, low hood and swept-up rear, and is faintly reminiscent of the original Studebaker Avanti." As with the Volkswagen, the Gremlin's styling set it apart from other cars. Time said, "like some other cars of less than standard size, the back seat is designed for small children only." The Gremlin's wider stance gave it "a stable, quiet and relatively comfortable ride—for the two front passengers", for whom, by small-car standards, there was more than average interior width, seat room, and legroom. The six cubic feet of luggage space behind the back seat was less than in the rear-engine Volkswagen Beetle, but with the seat folded the cargo area tripled to 18 cubic feet (509.7 L).

The upright design of the tail, which helped enhance interior space, was aerodynamically efficient. Later, some European and Japanese manufacturers similarly created different body styles on a single compact car platform by extending or shortening the trunk (e.g., Volkswagen's Jetta and Golf models).

=== Marketing ===
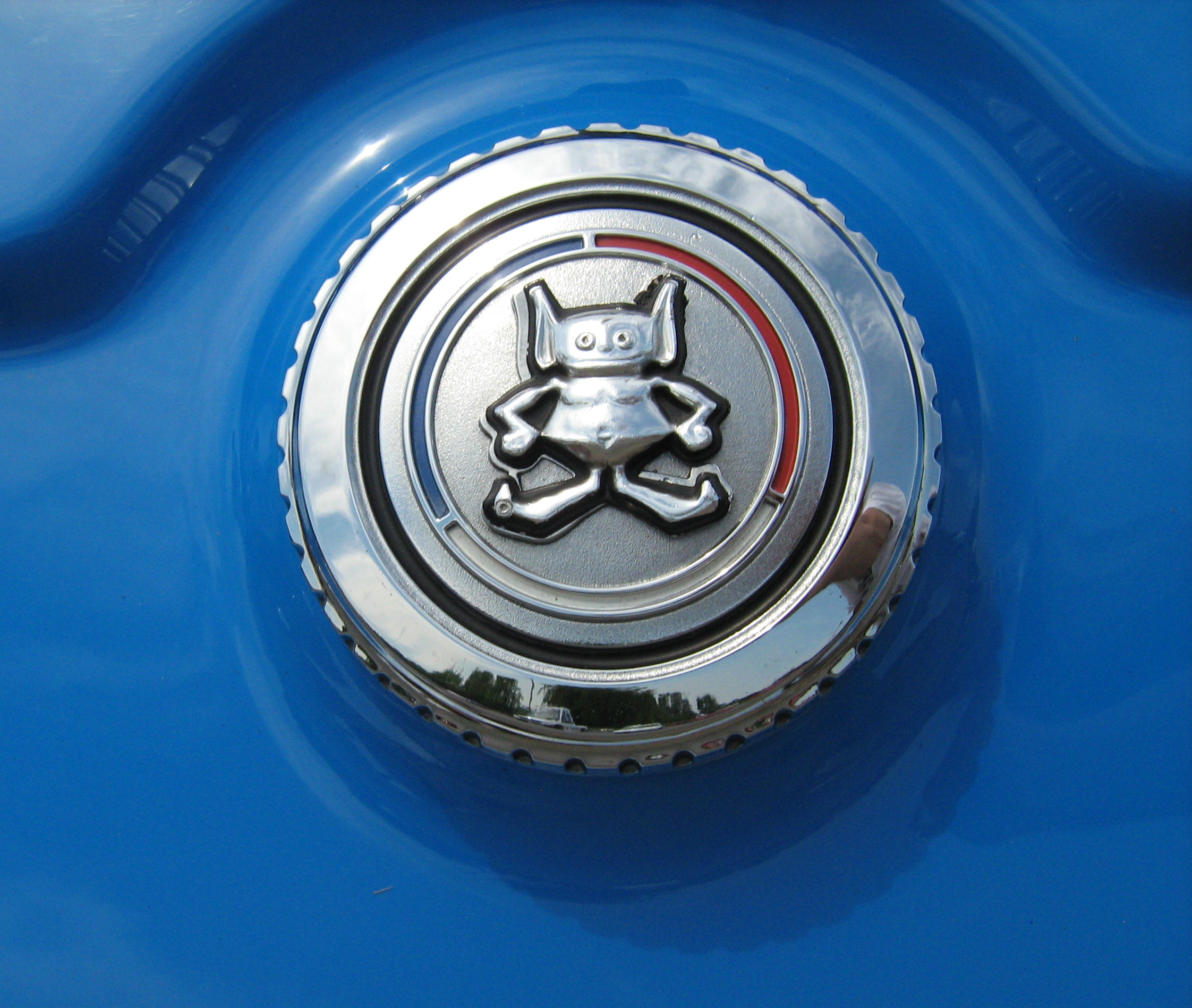
AMC Gremlin logo on gas cap

Designed and named by Teague to look either "cute or controversial - depending on one's viewpoint ... for many, it seemed perfect for the free-thinking early 1970s." American Motors executives apparently felt confident enough not to worry that the Gremlin name might have negative connotations. Time magazine noted two definitions for gremlin: "Defined by Webster's as 'a small gnome held to be responsible for malfunction of equipment.' American Motors' definition: 'a pal to its friends and an ogre to its enemies.'" The car's cartoon-inspired mascot was marketed for product differentiation and was intended to be memorable to consumers. The Gremlin's hatchback design was also needed to make the car stand out in the competitive marketplace, and according to Teague: "Nobody would have paid it any attention if it had looked like one of the Big Three" automobiles.

AMC promoted the Gremlin as "America's first subcompact". This description overlooks the Nash Metropolitan and the earlier Crosley. The Metropolitan—a subcompact-sized captive import, American-conceived and American-designed for the American market, and built in the UK with a British engine—has a claim to be "America's first subcompact."

AMC marketed the Gremlin as "cute and different," a strategy successful in attracting more than 60 percent of purchasers under the age of 35.

=== Annual changes (1970–1978) ===
==== 1970 ====
The Gremlin debuted in April 1970 with AMC's 199 cu in (3.3 L) I6, a seven main bearing design which produced 128 hp (95 kW; 130 PS) as standard equipment, with AMC's 232 cu in (3.8 L) I6 - producing 145 hp (108 kW; 147 PS) - as an option. American Motors claimed the Gremlin offered "the best gas mileage of any production car made in America". According to the auto editors of Consumer Guide, it had "an unusually long option list for the era" so owners could have luxury and conveniences typically found in more expensive cars, and these options "came with a much higher profit margin" for the automaker.

As the first of the new domestic subcompact cars, "the Gremlin has been the most talked-about car since its introduction." Sales for the abbreviated model year were 25,300.

Popular Science assigned its editor to the equivalent of one year of driving by conducting a 10,000-mile (16,093 km) cross-country road test of a brand new Gremlin, and reported after driving it "without a single problem is an enviable record" and that "we were all impressed with the quality of this vehicle." A nationwide survey based on owners driving their 1970 AMC Gremlins over 1,350,000 miles (2,172,614 km) conducted by Popular Mechanics concluded that the unique styling attracted many buyers, but economy topped their likes.

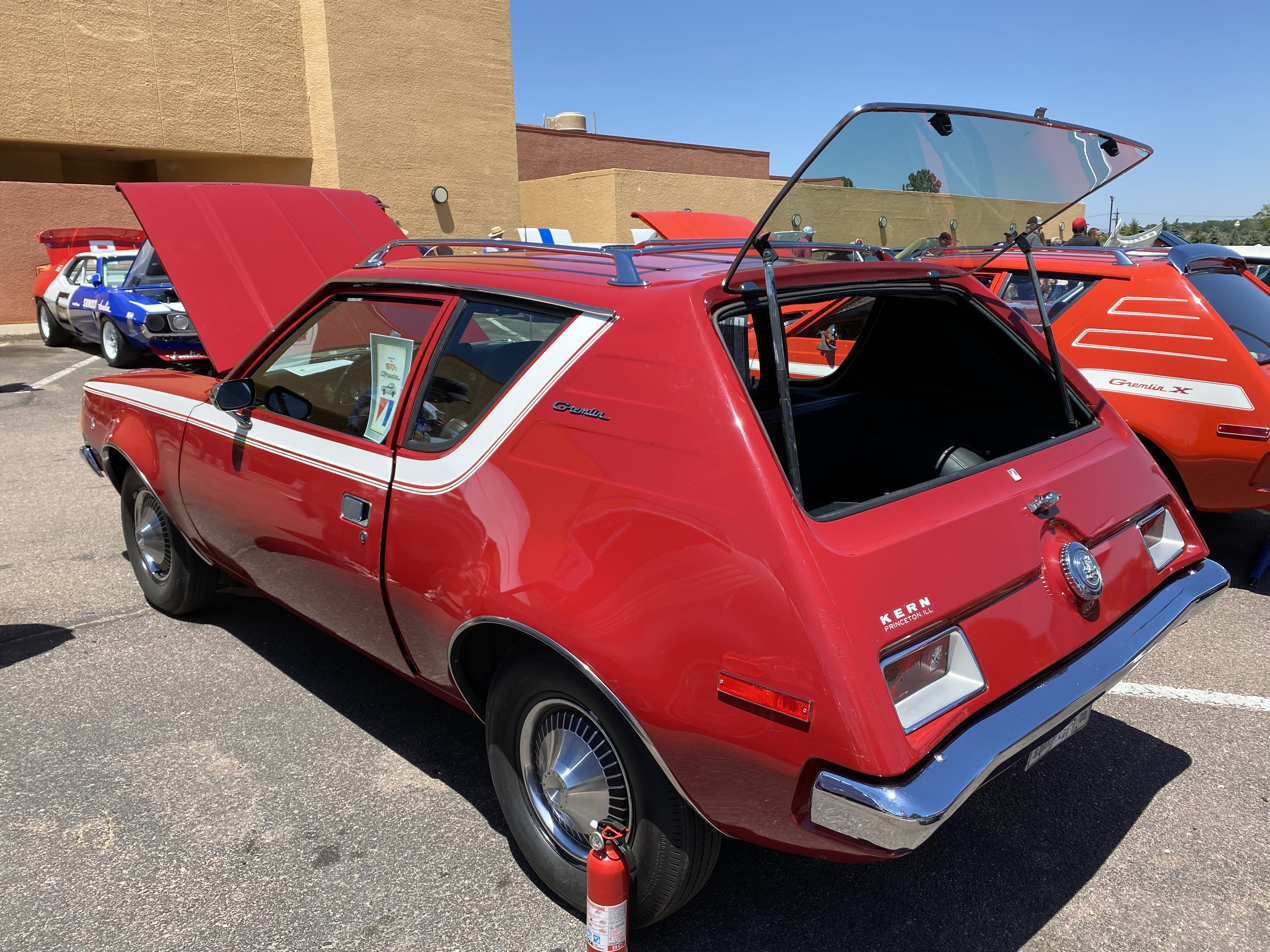
1970 AMC Gremlin

==== 1971 ====
For the 1971 model year, the "X" appearance/equipment trim package was introduced as a $300 option on the four-passenger model and "proved extremely popular." It included body side tape stripes, body color front fascia, slotted road wheels with D70x14 Goodyear Polyglas tires, blackout grille insert, bucket seats, and "X" decals.

The two-passenger Gremlin version entered into its second and final season. The 232 cu in (3.8 L) I6 engine, which was optional for 1970, became standard, while a longer-stroke 258 cu in (4.2 L) version became the option. Compression ratios dropped from 8.5:1 to 8:1 for 1971, resulting in 135 hp (101 kW; 137 PS) (gross) from the 232 cu in (3.8 L) and 150 hp (112 kW; 152 PS) (gross) from the 258 cu in (4.2 L)

1971 Gremlin prices increased slightly (up by $20 to $1,899 for the base model), and sales for this first full model year rose to 53,480.

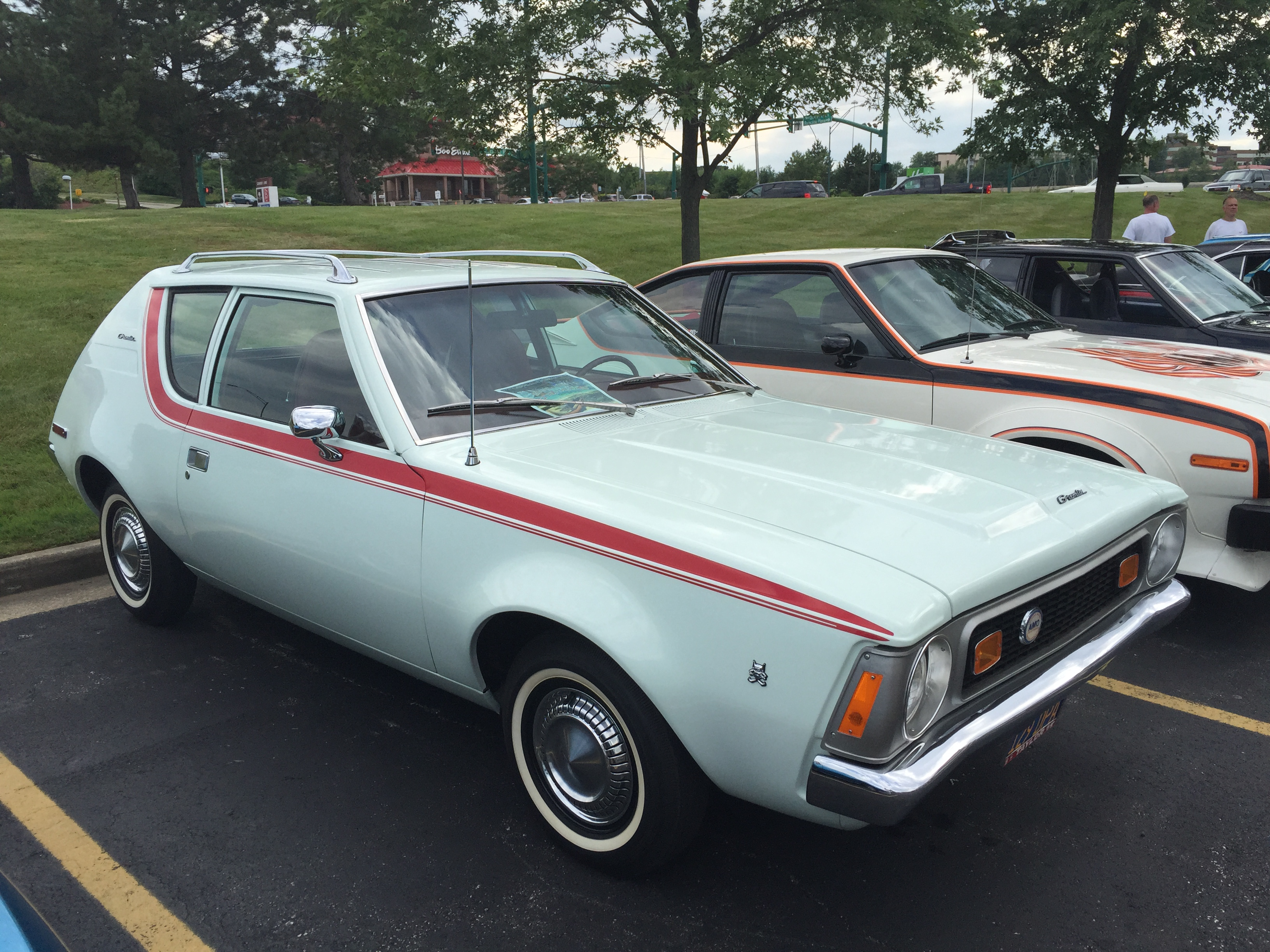
1971 AMC Gremlin

==== 1972 ====
Among many other changes was the availability of a 304 cu in (5.0 L) V8 engine. It was "the muscle car formula of stuffing a big motor in a small car." Engine ratings were downgraded to more accurate Society of Automotive Engineers (SAE) net hp figures, bringing the 232 cu in (3.8 L) engine to 100 hp (75 kW; 101 PS), the 258 cu in (4.2 L) to 110 hp (82 kW; 112 PS) and the 304 V8 to 150 hp (112 kW; 152 PS). Even with the lower engine output ratings across the industry, "the V8 Gremlin was a poor-man's Corvette, able to spin its rear tires at will and outrun some larger, more expensive pony cars" and it was "the only real performance car available under $2,200."

The base two-seater model was discontinued, having sold 3,017 units in 18 months. Gremlins also switched from non-synchronized 1st gear manual transmissions to full synchromesh, and the Chrysler-designed TorqueFlite replaced the Borg-Warner-sourced automatic transmission. Other minor technical upgrades improved the car's reliability and durability.

The Gremlin X package continued to be popular, while optional features now included an AM/FM radio, fabric sunroof, tilt steering wheel, inside hood release, trailer towing package for up to 2,000 lb (907 kg) with a Class 1 hitch, as well as manual or power-assisted front disk brakes.

American Motors introduced the automobile industry's first 12-month or 12,000 mi (19,312 km) bumper-to-bumper warranty, called the "Buyer Protection Plan". Its foundation was an emphasis on quality and durability, improved production by reducing the number of models and increasing the level of standard equipment. The new warranty included an innovative promise to customers that AMC would repair anything wrong with the car (except for tires). Owners were provided with a toll-free number to the company, as well as a free loaner car if a warranty repair took overnight. Numerous production and product improvements would result in fewer warranty claims, better public relations, and greater customer satisfaction and loyalty.

Model year 1972 sales totaled 61,717, a 15% gain over the previous year.

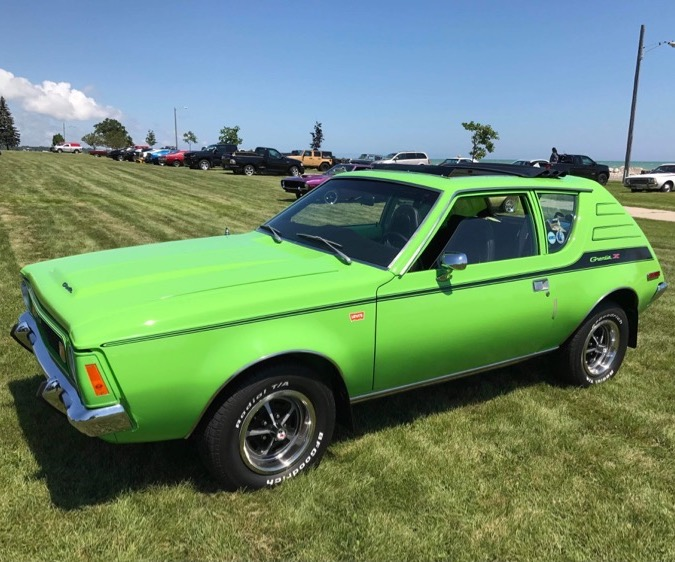
1972 AMC Gremlin X with factory sun roof and V8

==== 1973 ====
For the 1973 model year, AMC strengthened bumpers able to withstand a 5-mile-per-hour (8 km/h) impact in the front and a 2.5-mile-per-hour (4 km/h) impact in the rear, without any damage to the engine, lights, and safety equipment, according to new mandates by the U.S. National Highway Traffic Safety Administration (NHTSA). A Levi's interior trim package was available that included spun nylon upholstery made to look like denim (fire safety regulations prohibited the use of real cotton denim). Details included removable map pockets, burnished copper denim rivets, and red Levi's logo tabs. Rear-seat legroom was increased. The X package received a new tape-striping pattern that kicked up over the Gremlin's rear-wheel flares.

Sales improved to 122,844 units, nearly 30% more than in 1972. A 1973 Gremlin purchased by Consumer Reports was top-rated among the six subcompact models tested for the June issue. The car had relatively few sample defects and proved reliable over the magazine's long-term test.

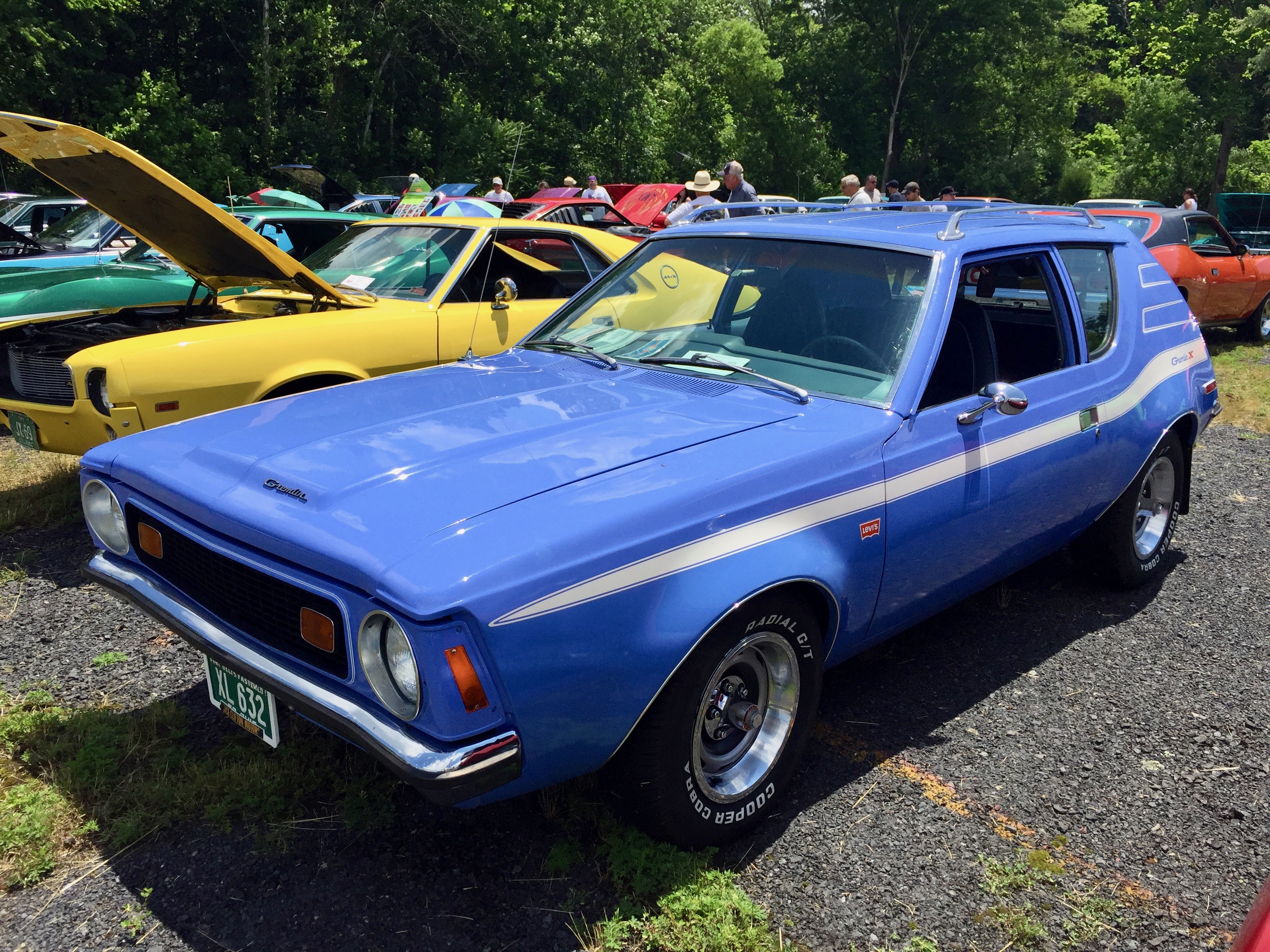
1973 AMC Gremlin X

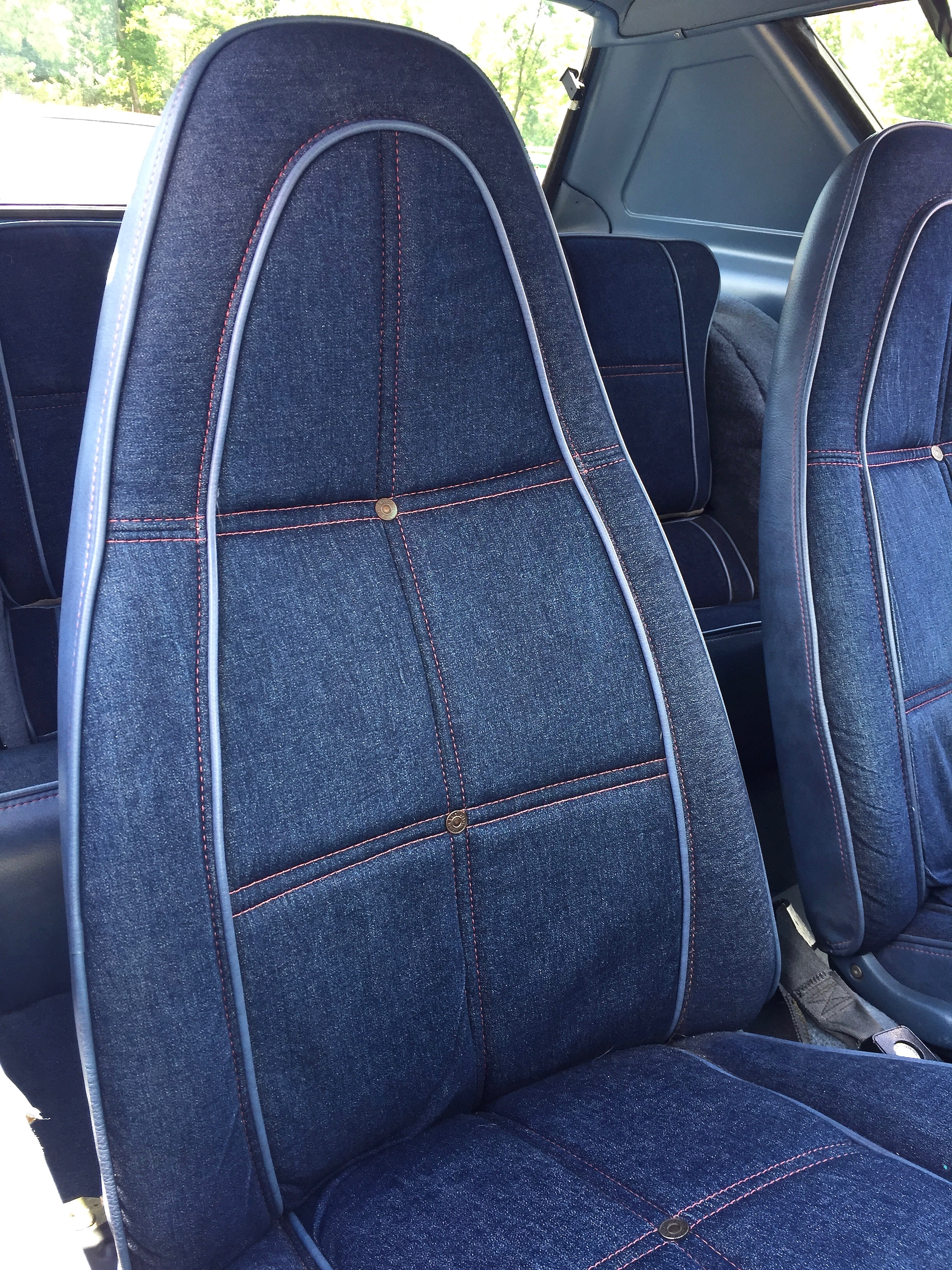
1973 AMC Gremlin X Levi's interior trim package

==== 1974 ====
The Arab Oil Embargo of October 1973 came just as the 1974 model year began. American Motors improved the Gremlin's back seat. A deeper front fascia made the car appear longer. A larger front bumper was mounted on self-restoring telescoping gas and oil cylinders. Unlike most other designs, the Gremlin did not use a filler panel between the bumper and body. A stronger rear bumper was set lower. NHTSA now required front and rear passenger car bumpers to have uniform heights, withstand angle impacts, and sustain 5-mile-per-hour (8 km/h) impacts with no damage. The rear fascia was modified slightly to blend with the design changes.

The Gremlin X stripe pattern was given a "hockey stick" look for 1974. The stripes followed the window line as it tapered aft, then swept up to include four diagonal lines on the wide C-pillar. The automaker incorporated a new typeface for nameplates in 1974, across all AMC models.

Production of the 1974 model year was extended into November to delay the need to install catalytic converters required by the United States Environmental Protection Agency (EPA) 2004 regulations starting with 1975 models. A total of 171,128 Gremlins were sold in 1974, an increase of nearly 40% over 1973 and 130% over 1971.

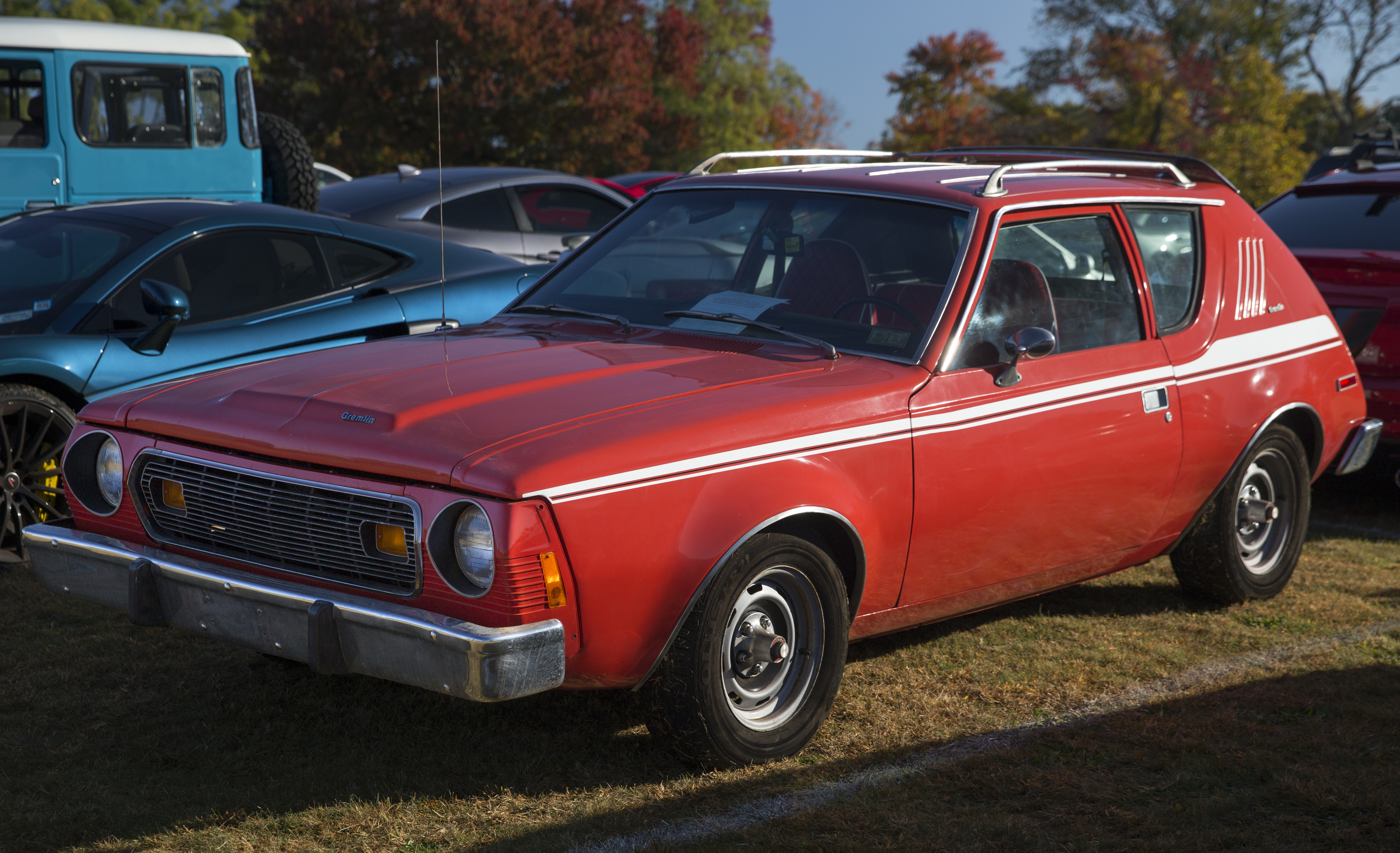
1974 AMC Gremlin

==== 1975 ====
Changes for the 1975 model year Gremlins included standard electronic ignition developed by Prestolite. All U.S. market Gremlins featured catalytic converters that required the use of unleaded regular-grade fuel. "Unleaded Fuel Only" warnings were placed by the fuel filler and on the fuel gauge. Gremlins with I6 engines and manual transmissions gained a new option, the electrically operated overdrive from Laycock de Normanville. The 0.714:1 "J-type" unit was controlled by a push-button at the end of the turn signal stalk. When turned on, the unit engaged automatically at speeds above 35 miles per hour (56 km/h) and dropped out at 32 mph (51 km/h). An accelerator pedal kick-down switch provided faster passing when needed. Steel-belted radial tires were now standard on Gremlins with the X package.

American Motors was promoting its economical models covered by the comprehensive "Buyer Protection Plan" warranty, as well as preparing for the launch of the Pacer The automaker was planning to spend half of the entire 1975 advertising budget on the new Pacer. Marketing for the Gremlin included tie-ins with a "Home Value Days" supplement designed to promote 18,500 hardware stores in Popular Science and The Reader's Digest as well as with Colgate-Palmolive's campaign using Willie Mays to "Help Young America" in Jet and Ebony.

The U.S. subcompacts were often compared with the new, front-wheel-drive Volkswagen Rabbit, which replaced the aging Beetle. Popular Science road tests showed the Gremlin to be the fastest and quietest of all, but had the lowest fuel efficiency with an average EPA rating of 21 mpg_{‑US} (11 L/100 km; 25 mpg_{‑imp}), compared to the Chevrolet Vega's 22 mpg_{‑US} (11 L/100 km; 26 mpg_{‑imp}), Ford Pinto's 23 mpg_{‑US} (10 L/100 km; 28 mpg_{‑imp}), and the Rabbit's 24 mpg_{‑US} (10 L/100 km; 29 mpg_{‑imp}). The Gremlin had an I6 engine and a three-speed transmission (in contrast to the I4 engines and four-speed transmissions in the other cars) and weighed over 1,000 lb (454 kg) more than the VW Rabbit.

Struggling under stagflation and an inflationary economy, sales of domestic subcompact cars slumped compared to the industry's record-breaking 1973 model year. In total, AMC sold 56,011 Gremlins in the (albeit shortened) 1975 model year, a 67% drop. The success of the innovative Pacer launched in mid-February 1975 "severely cut" the sales of both the Gremlin and Hornet models.

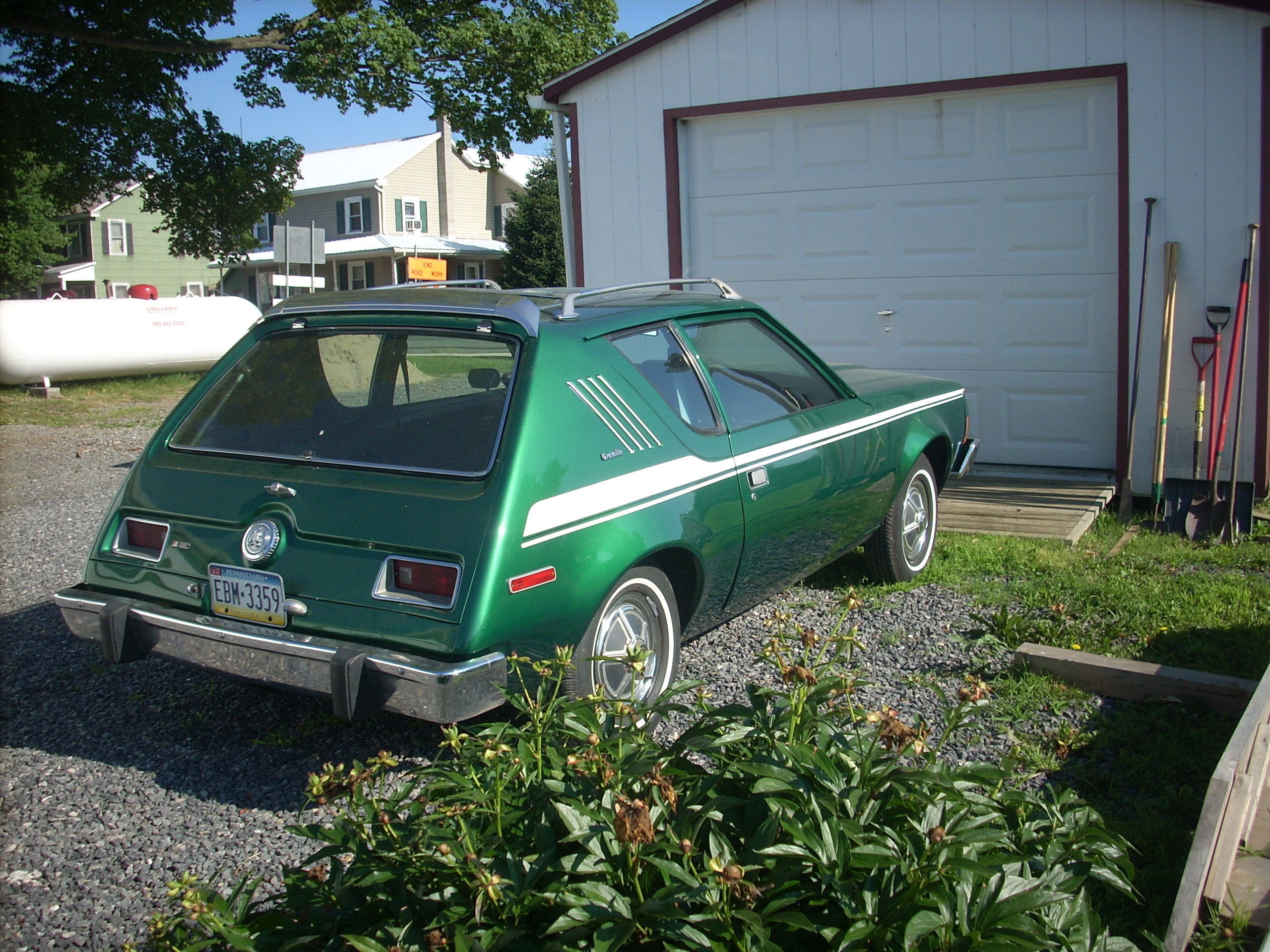
1975 AMC Gremlin

==== 1976 ====
Changes were greater for the 1976 Gremlins. Oval headlight bezels replaced the previous circular items. The grille shape became a stretched hexagon, with two opposing loops stacked atop each other and housing new, rounded parking/turn signal lights. A new "Custom" trim line debuted, featuring a striped interior trim called "Potomac", as well as a spare tire cover and other minor details. The models were given another new striping scheme: the hockey-stick-style stripe of the previous year, with a secondary extension that ran from the door handle straight back. The X package was now available only on Custom models.

Due to flagging sales, the 304 cu in (5.0 L) V8 engine option, now downgraded to 120 hp (89 kW; 122 PS), was canceled at midyear, after only 826 installations. (A total of 40,994 Gremlins were equipped with the V8 engine from 1972 until 1976.) A floor-shifted four-speed manual transmission was introduced at midyear.

Sales tapered slightly to 52,941 - a 5.5% decline. The overdrive option remained available until midyear, when Laycock de Normanville entered receivership. American Motors attempted to purchase the British manufacturer but could not acquire the funding in time.

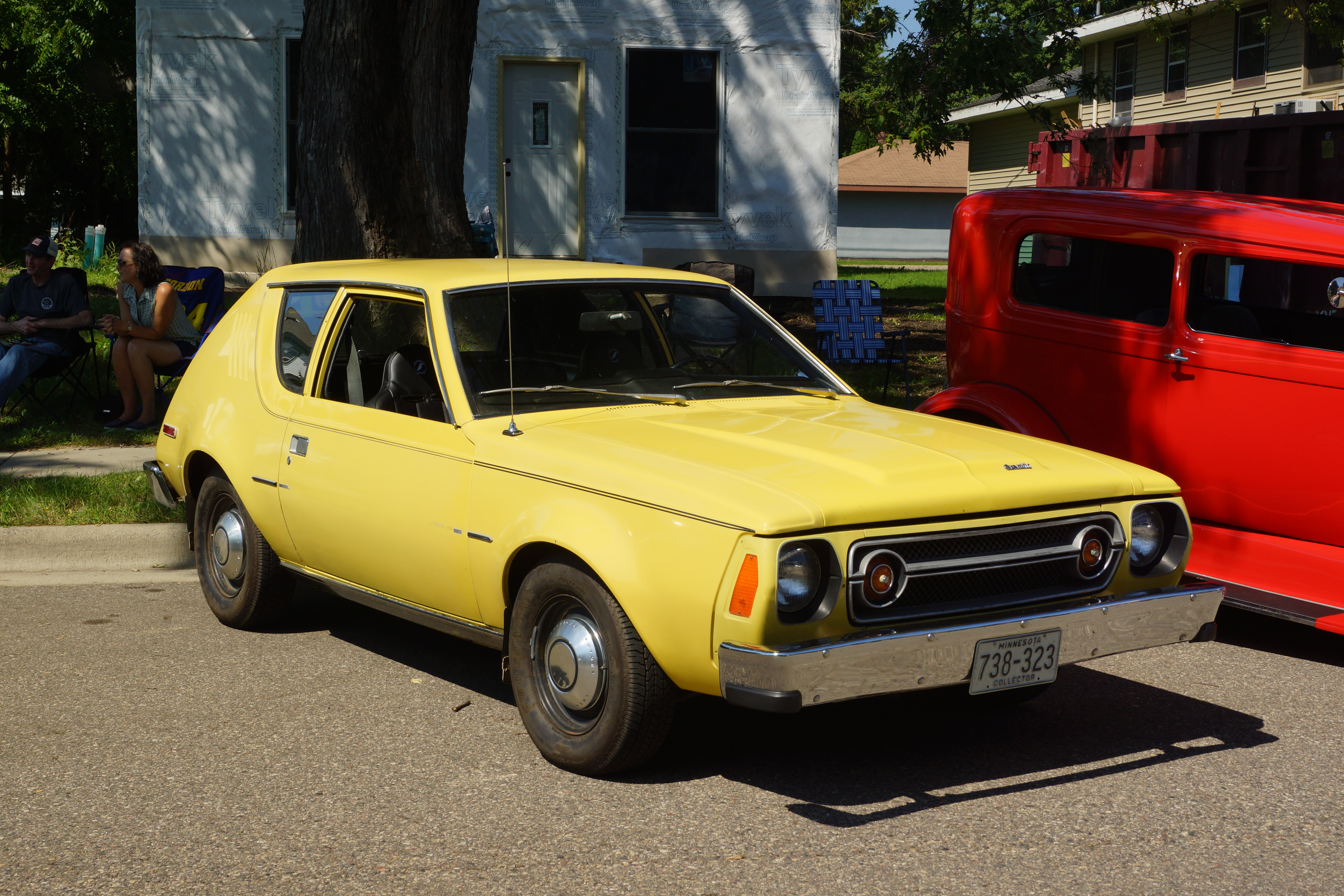
1976 AMC Gremlin

==== 1977 ====
Changes for 1977 included redesigned sheet metal for the first time in the Gremlin's now 8-year history: a revised hood, shorter front fenders, new bumpers, taller glass tailgate, enlarged taillights, and a rear license plate covering the fuel filler. The front end was shortened by four inches (102 mm) with all-new sheet metal and a crosshatch grille insert. Parking lights reverted to rectangular, and headlights were recessed into square bezels with rounded corners. The new hood had a small "power bulge" at the front. The base model now included carpeting, as well as rocker panel and wheel lip moldings. The "Custom" model had a list price of $2,998. The X package was offered at $189, with a new striping pattern that ran straight back from the front fenders and crested over the rear wheels. Front disc brakes became standard.

At the start of the model year, the Gremlin was available with either the standard 232 cu in (3.8 L) or optional 258 cu in (4.2 L) I6 engines. Both had increased power from updated cylinder heads and two-barrel carburetors. In addition, AMC offered a carbureted four-cylinder engine: a Volkswagen/Audi 2.0 L (122 cu in) I4, also used in fuel-injected form in the Porsche 924. This I4 gave better fuel economy but less power than the standard I6 engines, and reduced the Gremlin's weight by 250 pounds (113 kg), allowing it to achieve an EPA rating of 21 mpg_{‑US} (11 L/100 km; 25 mpg_{‑imp}) in the city, and 33 mpg_{‑US} (7 L/100 km; 40 mpg_{‑imp}) on the highway. It was reserved for the Custom model of the Gremlin because the expense of acquiring the rights to the engine meant that AMC could not afford to make it standard equipment. Of the 46,171 Gremlins built for 1977 (13% less than in 1976), only 7,558 had the new 2.0 L engine.

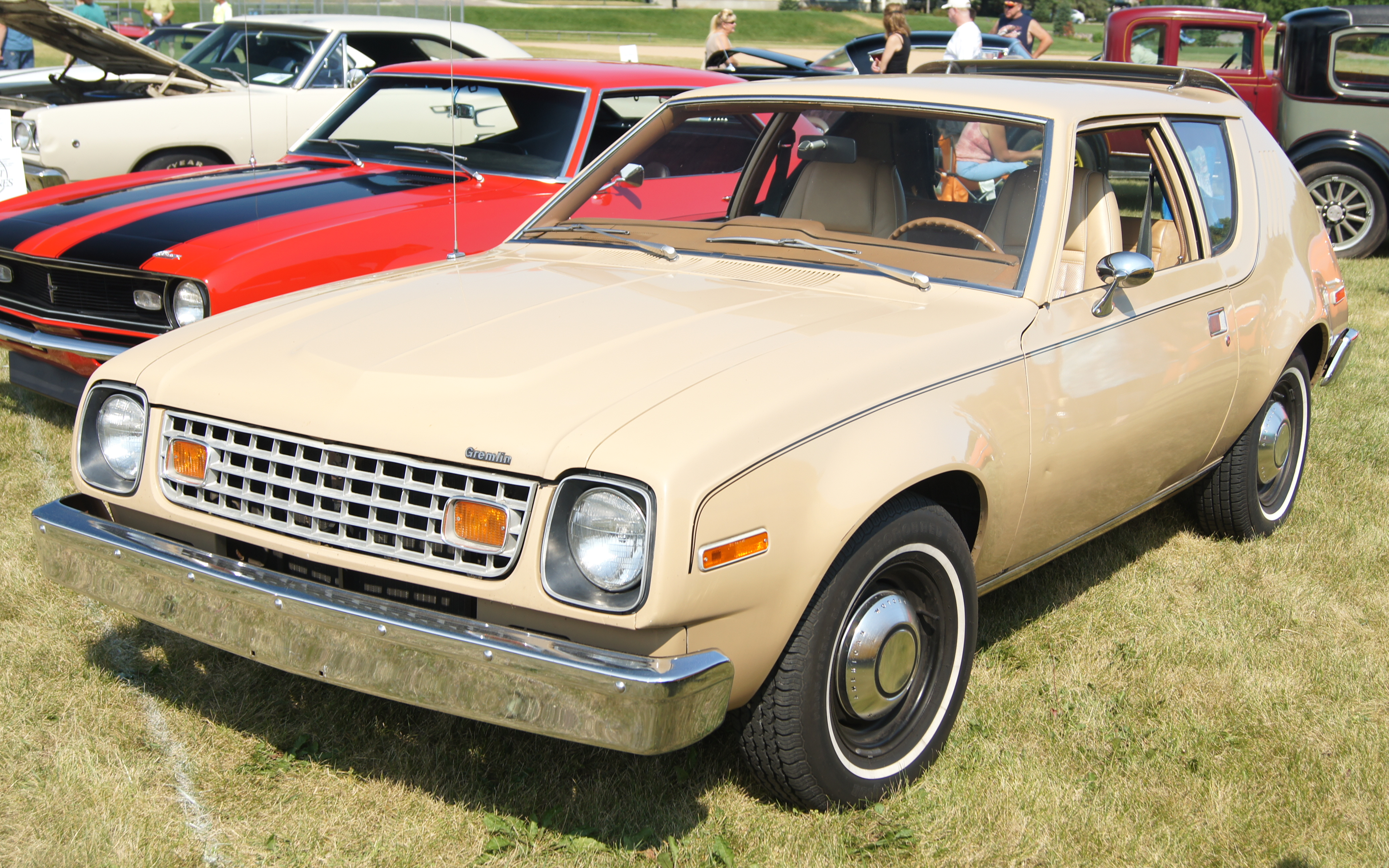
1977 AMC Gremlin with new front-end styling

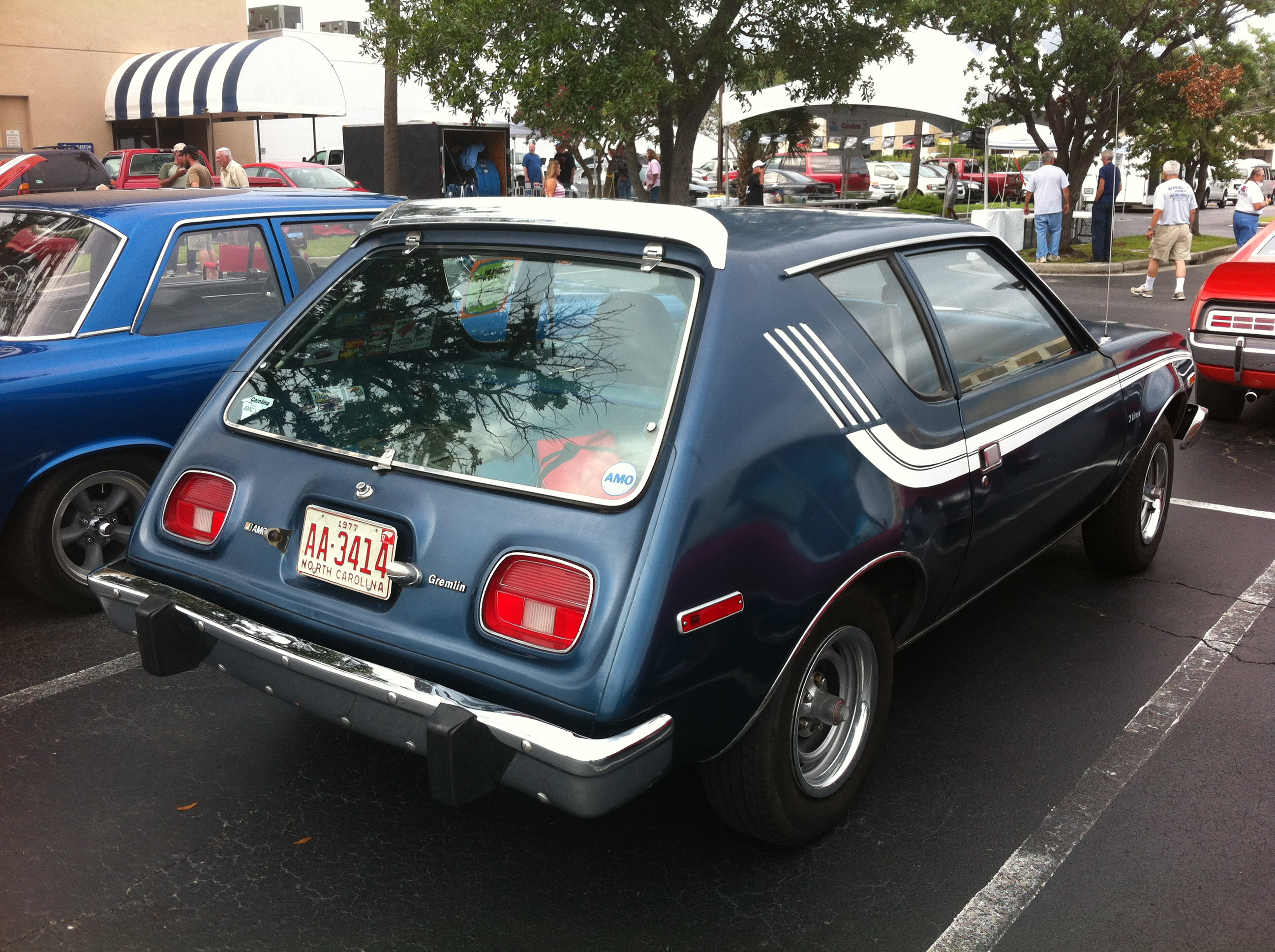
1977 AMC Gremlin Custom 2 Liter (rear)

==== 1978 ====
In its final year of 1978, the Gremlin received several changes. However, customers on a budget could still purchase a standard I6 base model Gremlin for under US$3,400. A new "Custom" model featured either the four- or six-cylinder engine with a standard four-speed manual transmission and new vinyl bucket seats, wheel lip moldings, and other trim upgrades. Inside the Gremlin there was a revised instrument panel borrowed from the then-new 1978 Concord. The dashboard had high-level ventilation, HVAC controls within easy reach, and a flat, full-width top. The X package tape striping pattern was revised to match the 1978 Concord Sport package design, with the stripe at the lower body side and curving over the wheel lip.

At mid-season, a GT package became available with a front spoiler and flared wheel openings as on the 1978 AMX. The GT added an aluminum overlay to the instrument panel, was powered by the 258 cu in (4.2 L) I6 as standard, and had a unique striping scheme: a wide tape stripe, outlined by a narrow one, ran back from the front fenders and widened aft of the rear quarter windows. The package also included body-color fender flares and a front air dam, as well as body-color bumpers, all of which combined to give the GT a modern, aggressive look. Fewer than 3,000 Gremlin GTs were built.

The Gremlin's body shape had not changed appreciably in its nine years of production, and other more advanced subcompacts, lighter in weight, with more doors, better interiors, and front-wheel drive, had appeared on the market. Gremlin sales for the final year fell 52% to 22,104 units. By the time production ceased, a total of 671,475 Gremlins had been built.

The updated AMC Spirit replaced the Gremlin for the 1979 model year, basically "a Gremlin with conventional styling ... Lovable, sturdy cars are hard to kill."

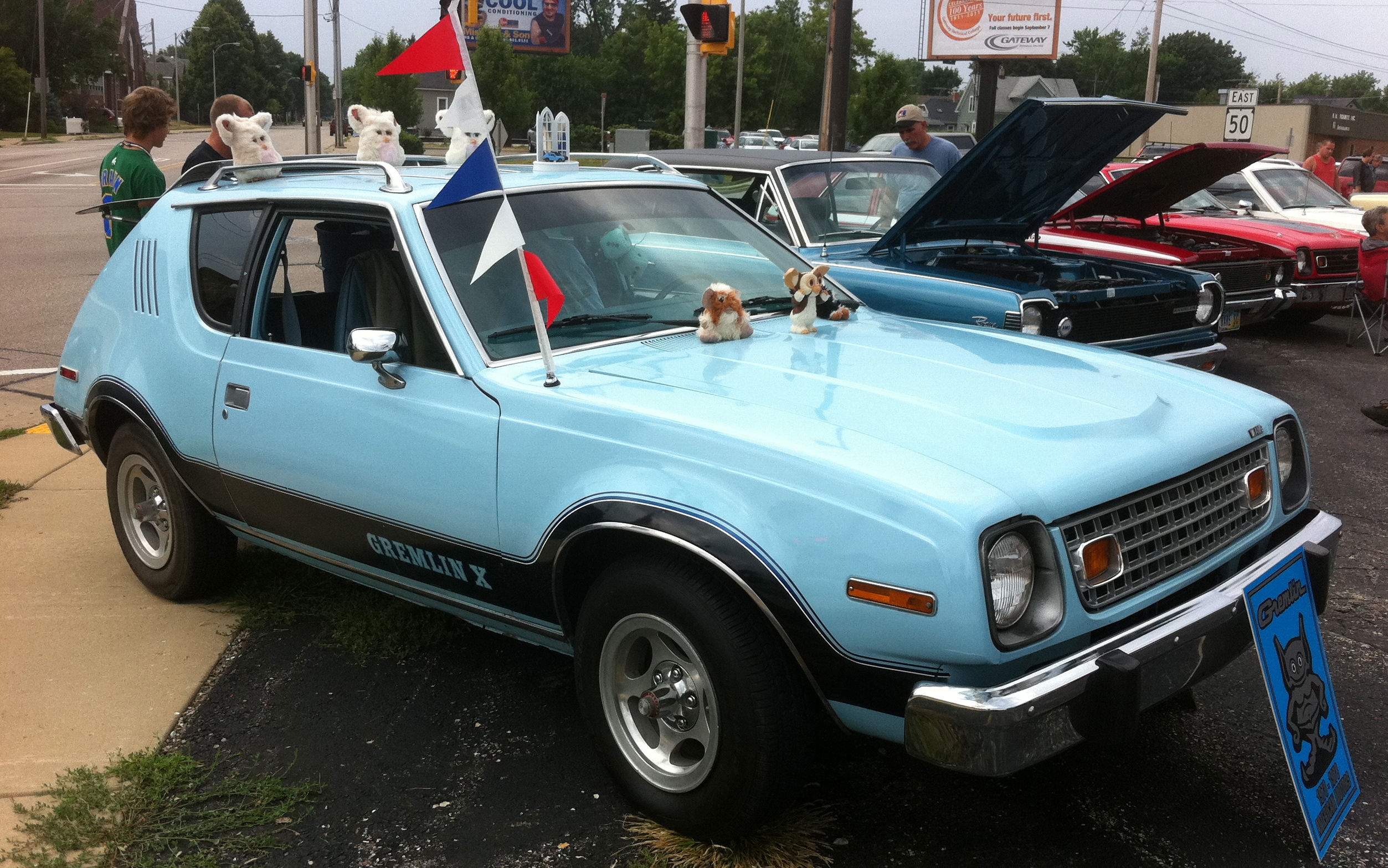
1978 AMC Gremlin X

=== Performance ===
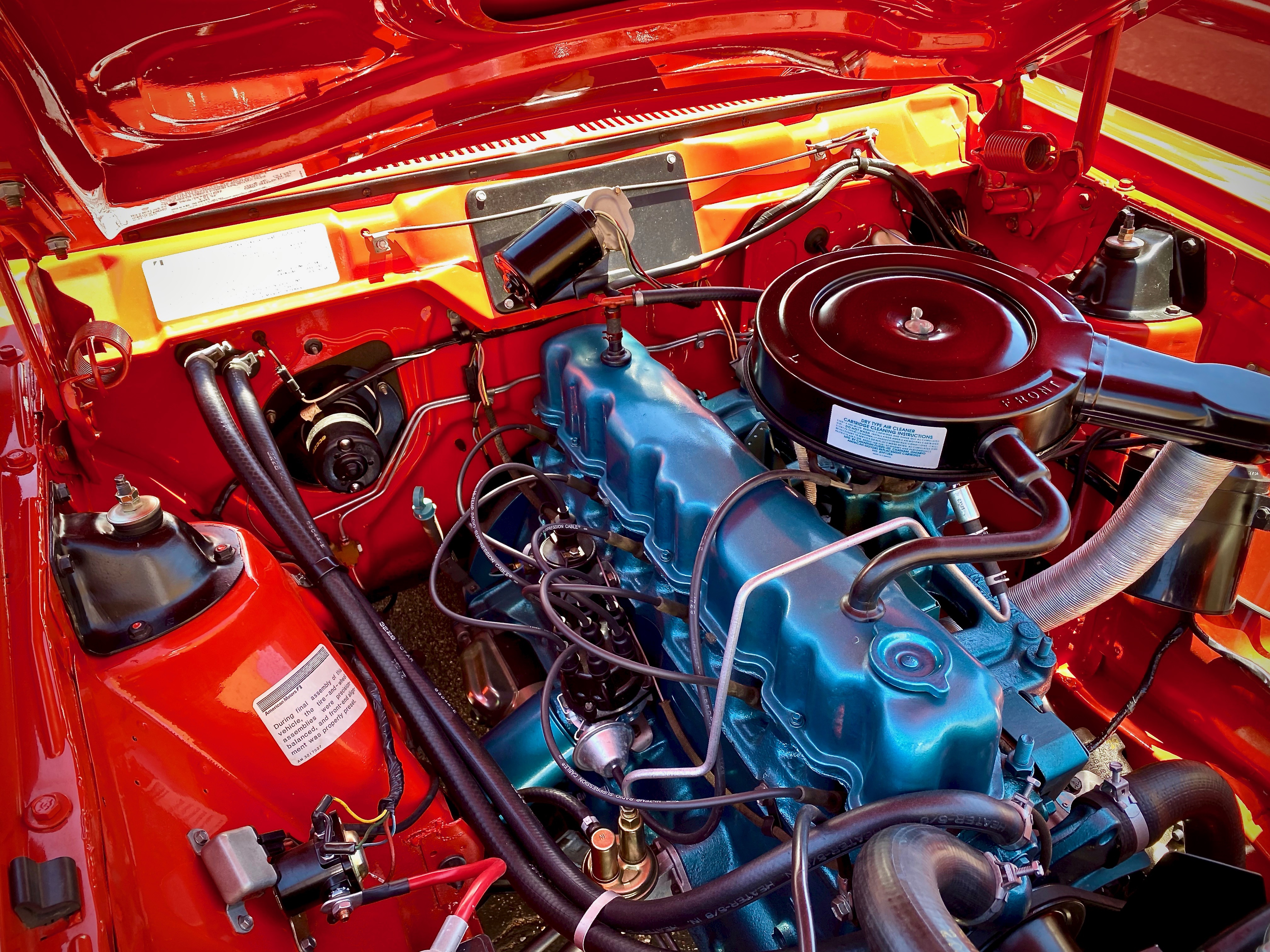
258 cu in (4.2 L) I6 engine

The Gremlin was faster than other subcompacts of the time. Motor Trend magazine recorded zero to 60 mph (0 to 97 km/h) in 12.6 seconds with the 232 cu in (3.8 L) engine. The Ford Pinto and the VW Beetle were in the 18-second range. Fuel economy was 28 mpg_{‑US} (8 L/100 km; 34 mpg_{‑imp}) to 30 mpg_{‑US} (8 L/100 km; 36 mpg_{‑imp}) with the small six, compared with the 35-plus mpg economy of the VW Beetle.

Although front-heaviness was generally thought to compromise the handling, Tom McCahill wrote in Mechanix Illustrated that the Gremlin was "fast and easy", with a comparatively stiff ride because of the shortened rear springs. He ran a 232-engine Gremlin with automatic transmission from zero to 60 mph (0 to 97 km/h) in 11.9 seconds, saw 100 mph (161 km/h) on the Daytona Speedway straightaway, and summarized: "On a dollar for dollar basis, I rate the Gremlin the best American buy of the year".

Car and Driver magazine also recorded 0 to 60 mph in 11.9 seconds with a 232-powered Gremlin.

Automobile Quarterly's article "A Critical Look at the 1973 American Cars" summarized that the basic "Gremlin offers outstanding performance for an economy car and excellent fuel mileage."

When Popular Mechanics magazine tested the car with the Audi I4 engine introduced in 1977, they said its acceleration with a four-speed manual felt "amazingly strong", with 0–60 mph and quarter-mile times one second slower than with the 232 cu in (3.8 L) engine (16 vs. 15, and 21 vs. 20 seconds respectively). The smaller engine produced EPA mileage of 35 mpg_{‑US} (7 L/100 km; 42 mpg_{‑imp}) highway and 22 mpg_{‑US} (11 L/100 km; 26 mpg_{‑imp}) city.

The Gremlin's body was heavier and stronger than its domestic or imported rivals. The engines were also more powerful than the Gremlin's main domestic and imported competition. The powertrains were smoother and more reliable, and the car had fewer recalls. Its chief import rival was the Volkswagen Beetle, which did not handle as well. The same overall size as the Gremlin, it was packaged marginally better. Gremlin designer Richard Teague commented in Motor Trend that to compare the Beetle (whose basic design originated in the late 1930s) to the Gremlin in profile and body design was like "comparing a Ford GT40 to the Hindenburg".

The Gremlin holds the "distinction of offering one of the widest engine ranges of all time—from two liters to five liters."

=== Randall 401-XR ===
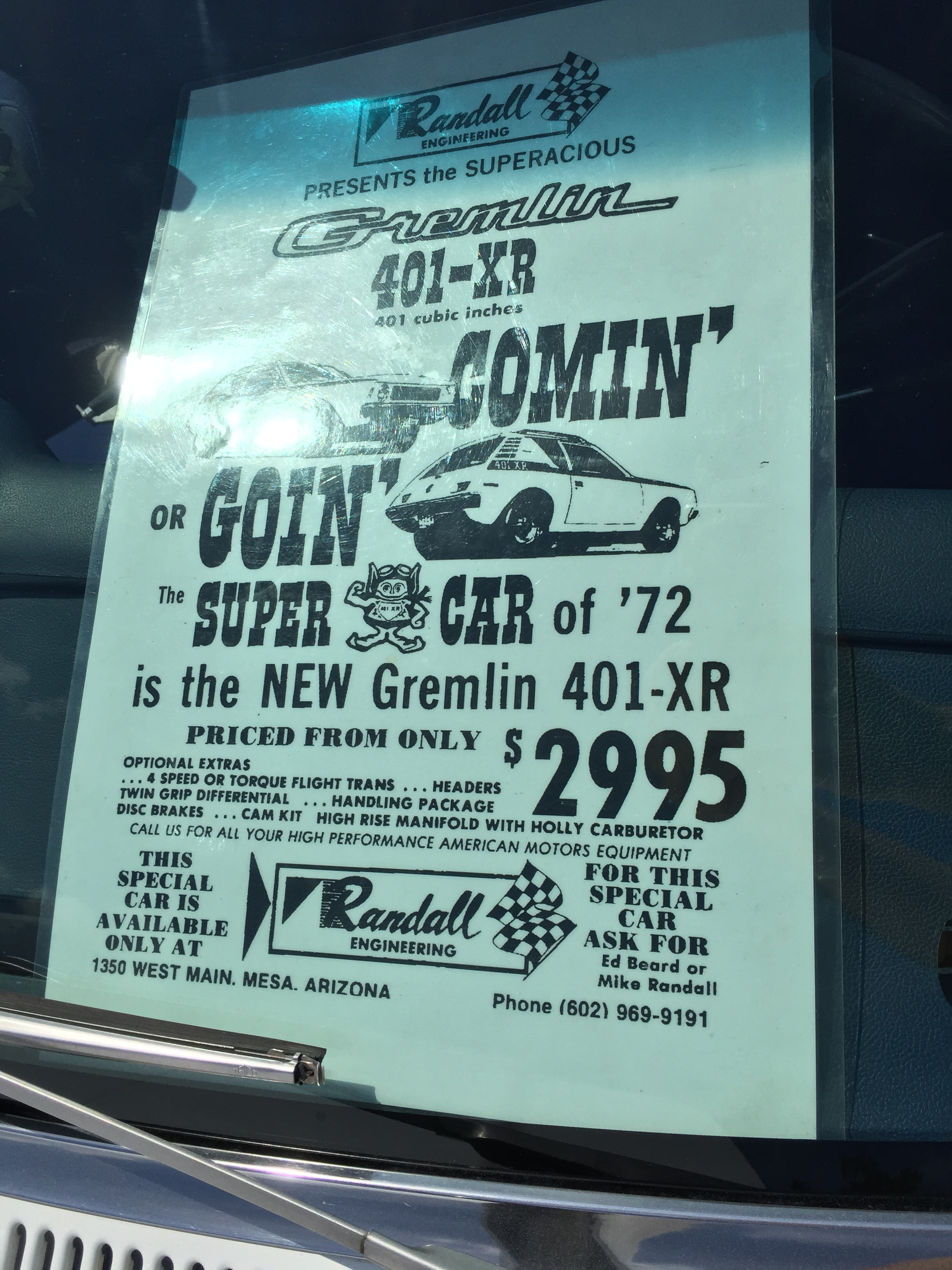
Randall 401-XR advertisement on a replica car

Randall AMC dealership in Mesa, Arizona, received AMC's endorsement to build 401 cu in (6.6 L) V8-powered Gremlins. The cars started as 304 cu in (5.0 L) models from the factory. and after Randall's modifications would turn in 13.90 second passes at 103–106 mph (166–171 km/h) in the quarter mile dragstrip and were priced at $2,995. Known as the Randall 401-XR (X for Gremlin X, R for Randall), a total of twenty cars were built for the street and one for the strip during 1972, 1973, and 1974. In 2012, the Randalls built a 22nd Continuation Plum 1974 Gremlin 401XR, originally intending to build a few, but completed only one. Car Craft magazine tested one with some modifications and achieved 115.07 mph (185.19 km/h) in 12.22 seconds in the quarter while remaining a "totally streetable, daily-driver". In 1972, Super Stock and Drag Illustrated magazine had a "Special Gremlin" issue. One of the many venues where Randall's 1972 Gremlin 401XR Super Stock car campaigned was at the 1972 NHRA Winternationals.

== Competition ==
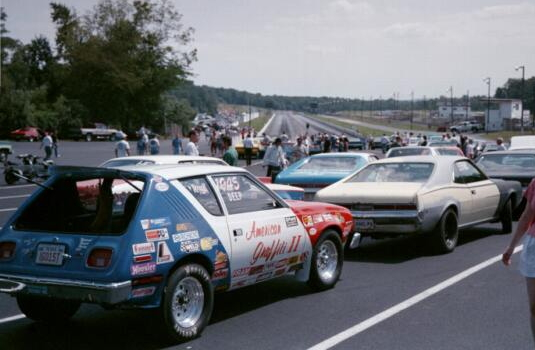
Modified 1977 AMC Gremlin at a dragstrip

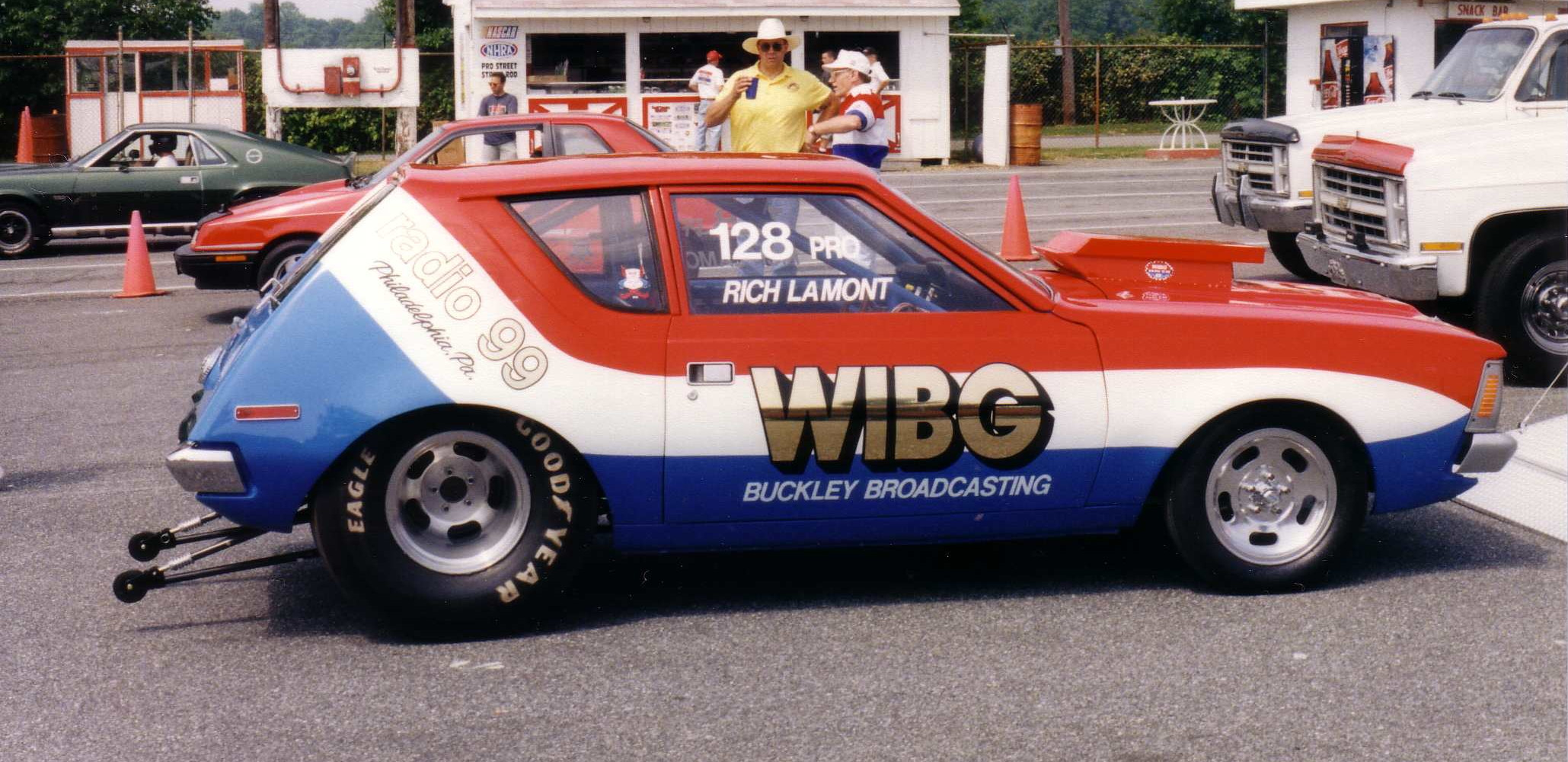
The "99 WIBG" Pro-Stock 1972 AMC Gremlin

The AMC Gremlin saw action at numerous auto racing venues, including endurance, as well as oval and road racing. Due to their inherent inexpensiveness, strength, and simplicity to modify for higher performance, many AMC Gremlins were used in drag racing.

In the International Motor Sports Association (IMSA) RS series for compact sedans, Raleigh, North Carolina's "Team Highball," run by Amos Johnson and Bunny Johnson, was the AMC factory-backed team, with Amos Johnson, Whit Diggett, and later, Dennis Shaw driving. The torque of their 232 cu in (3.8 L) I6 Gremlins gave a big advantage on the faster tracks like the Daytona International Speedway, where they were often more than a match for the BMW 2002, Alfa Romeo GTV, Datsun 510, Ford Pinto, Mercury Capri, and Opel Manta. Johnson was the series 1973 co-champion, while independent driver George Alderman took the 1974 title.

Starting in 1970, Wally Booth headed AMC's Pro Stock drag racing efforts. He and other drivers campaigned Gremlins painted in the hash red, white, and blue pattern that AMC had adopted as its corporate race livery. Dick Arons built the engines. The team "transformed the brand's staid grocery-getter reputation from the ground up into that of a genuine performance powerhouse". Wally Booth "was one of the Edelbrock crew's favorite racers".

The rule changes for the 1972 Pro Stock season opened drag racing for smaller cars fitted with small-block engines, and AMC was committed to fielding the Gremlin. The first car Booth built was a Gremlin body-in-white, but it was wrecked in a towing accident. The aerodynamics of the Gremlin's body were a impediment, leaving Booth winning only four rounds in 1972.

In preparation for the 1973 racing season, Booth built a tube chassis Gremlin with the former Penske Racing fabricator, Ron Fournier, but switched to a Hornet body Pro Stock body after realizing that the Gremlin's aerodynamics were limiting top speed during testing at the Milan Dragway in Michigan. In early 1973, Booth, along with the team of Dick Maskin and Dave Kanners, joined Team AMC to campaign Hornets.

The automaker's involvement in drag racing led to coordination in the development of the Gremlin 401XR. Grant and Mike Randall, owners of Randall Rambler/AMC, built a 1972 Gremlin 401XR drag car that they raced at the ARHA Winter Nationals 1972. The Randalls also wrote a high-Performance AMC Engine Tuning guide as well as the "Randall Rambler & Jeep Speed Bible."

Three factory Pro-Stock 1972 Gremlin drag racers were campaigned around the nation. One was driven by Rich LaMont and sponsored by radio station 99 WIBG in Philadelphia, Pennsylvania. This car has been restored with a 401 cu in (6.6 L) AMC V8 with a four-speed manual transmission, and it runs the quarter-mile at around 8.75 seconds, achieving over 150 mph (241 km/h).

Other drivers to compete in Pro Stock with a Gremlin included Bert Straus, Jessie Childree, Dave Gilbert, Jim Johnson, Dennis Peck, LeRoy Roeder, and Max Smith.

At the 2006 World Power Wheelstanding Championships (not a race, but a "wheelie" contest), Brian Ambrosini's specially modified 1974 Gremlin took second place. The car gets all four of its wheels off the ground by its modified 485 cu in (7.9 L) AMC V8 producing 1,300 hp (969 kW; 1,318 PS) and achieving average quarter-mile e.t. in the low 8s with a trap speed of around 165 mph (266 km/h).

The body of the Gremlin was widely used by NASCAR paved and dirt modified stock car teams in the northeastern U.S. and elsewhere from the 1970s to the early 1990s. It was believed that the Gremlin's long roof with its rear kick-up provided aerodynamic advantages over the more commonly used Pinto and Vega bodies. Lenny Podbielski was "a major player in late 1970s Speedbowl action".

== Other markets ==
=== Canada ===
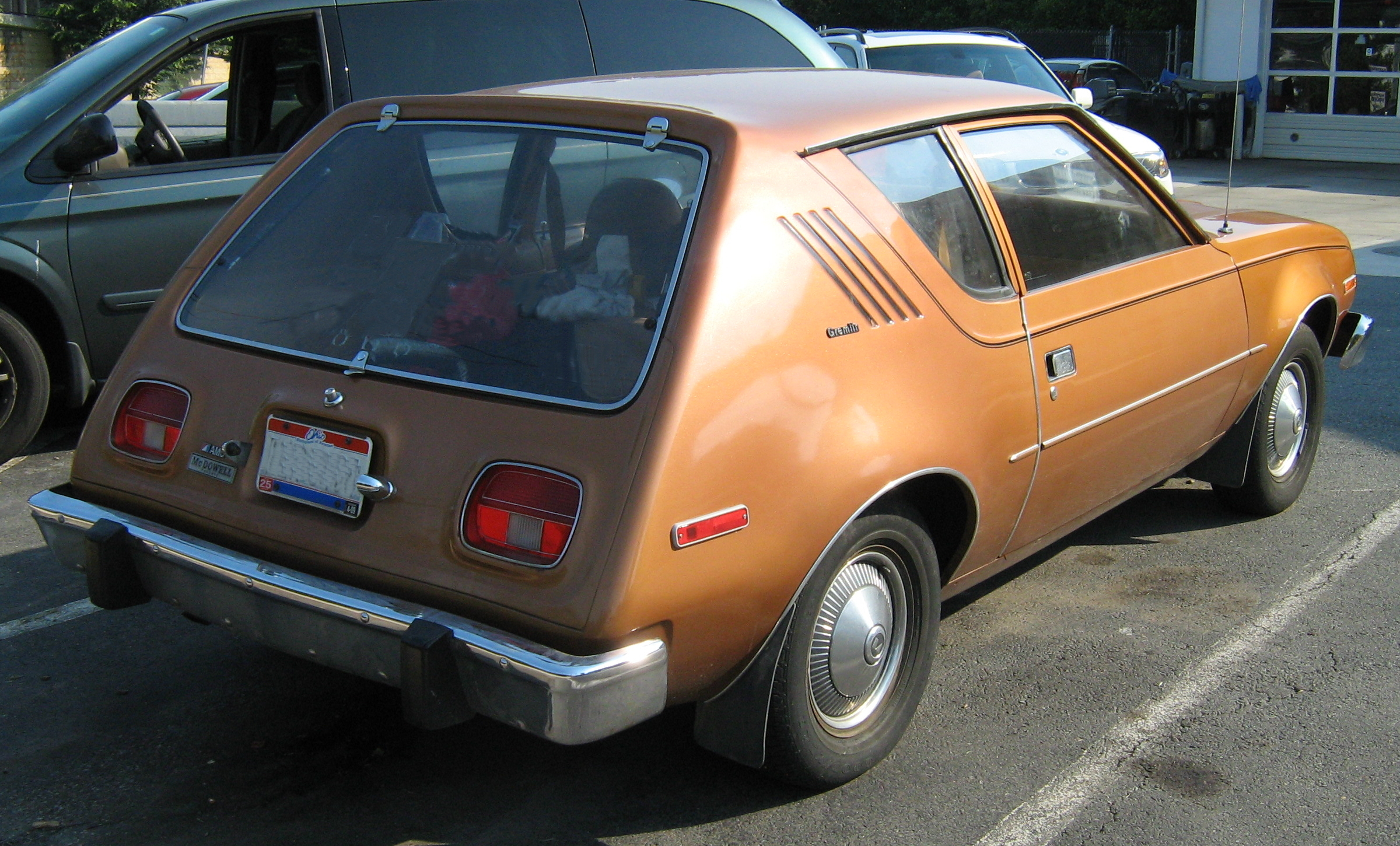
Canadian-built, base-model Gremlin

American Motors built an assembly plant in Brampton, Ontario, in 1961 for production of motor vehicles for the Canadian market as well as for the United States. The plant built and offered almost all AMC vehicles through the 1960s, allowing AMC to take advantage of the Canada–United States Automotive Products Agreement established between the two countries in 1965. By 1969, production at the Brampton Assembly had grown to such a size that AMC had the plant producing vehicles for the eastern half of the American continent while Kenosha produced vehicles for the western half of the continent. The plant ceased building the Ambassador after 1968 and imported the Javelin and later Matador from the United States but continued to build the Gremlin and Hornet throughout the 1970s.

With Canada moving to the metric system during the 1970s, late model Gremlins were built with their speedometers reading in kilometers per hour.

=== Mexico ===
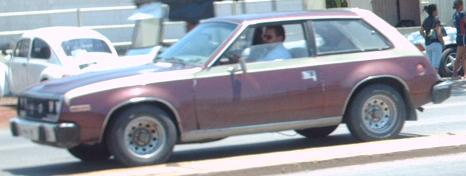
VAM Gremlin in Mazatlán, Mexico

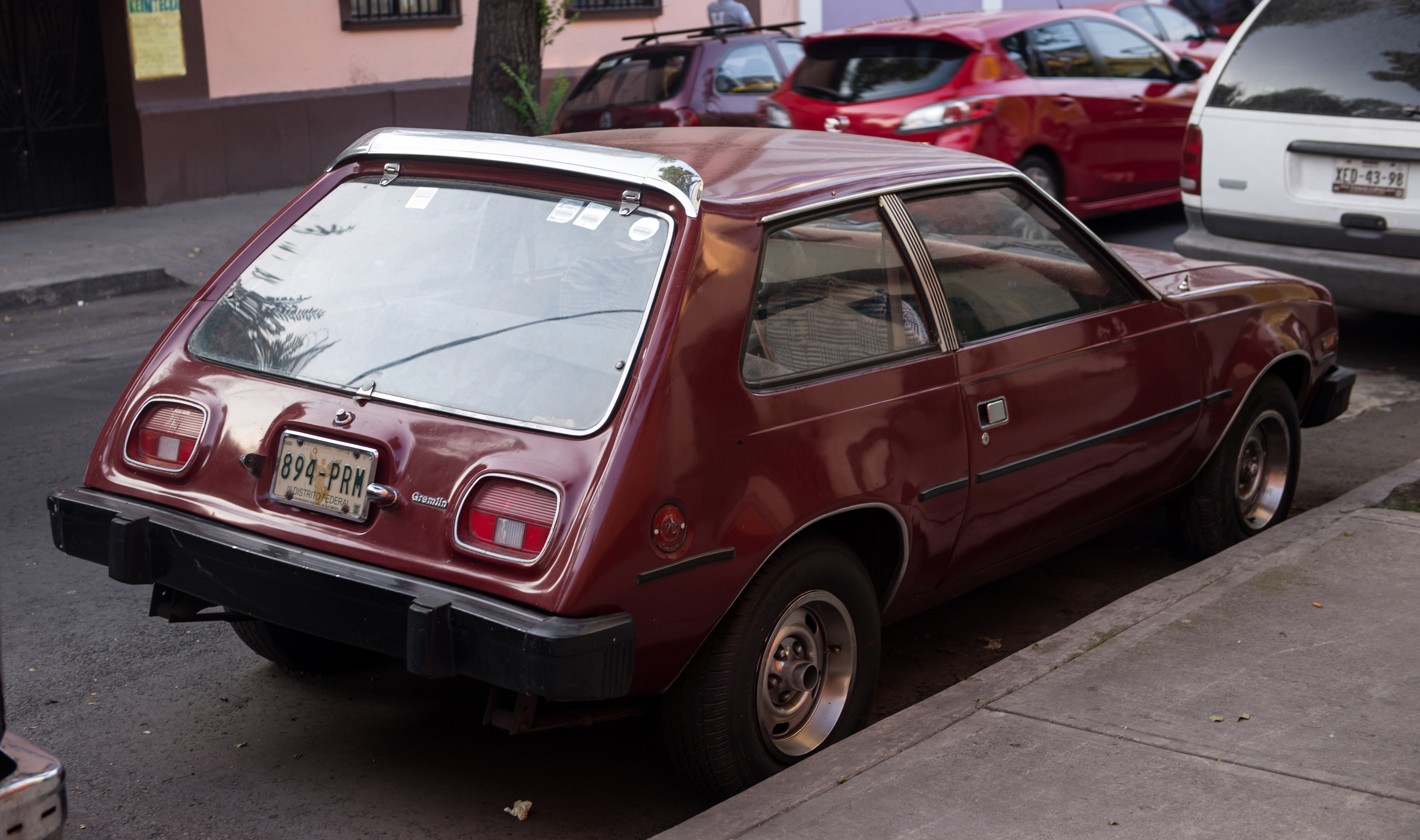
1979 VAM Gremlin X in Mexico City (missing side decals)

Vehiculos Automotores Mexicanos (VAM) manufactured Gremlins in Mexico under license and partial ownership (38% equity share) by AMC. Although the Gremlin was introduced to the U.S. and Canadian markets in 1970, VAM continued assembling its version of the Hornet still bearing the name Rambler American as its smallest, least expensive car until 1974. The fact that VAM already had three lines of products (the top limit permitted by legislation) from 1968 through 1973 made it impossible for the Gremlin to be offered. It was not until the discontinuation of the Javelin line in 1973 that free space was available for Gremlin production, making 1974 its year of debut.

The 1974 Gremlin was the third VAM car not to bear the Rambler name since the 1968 Javelin and the 1972 Classic (Matador in the U.S.) models. Moreover, the Mexican market continued to use the Gremlin model name for VAM's version of the AMC Spirit sedan from 1979 through 1983, several years after the Gremlin nameplate was withdrawn in the U.S. market.

The VAM cars had trim, interiors, and model names that differed from the equivalent AMC-made models. All engines built by VAM were of AMC design, modified to deal with Mexico's lower octane gasoline and higher altitudes. The VAM Gremlin was the only car line of its time not to be available with VAM's 282 cu in (4.6 L) version of AMC's I6, due to the economy market segment focus of the cars. This is exactly the opposite case as the AMC Gremlin, which was offered with the option of a 304 V8. The three-speed manual transmission with overdrive, the four-speed manual transmission, the V8 and Audi four-cylinder engines were never available. Trim levels and versions like the two-seater, the Levis Gremlin, the Gremlin Custom, and the Gremlin GT were also never available.

==== 1974 ====
The introductory 1974 Gremlins became unique by incorporating the front clip of the 1974 U.S. AMC Hornet models. VAM never attempted to hide the relationship between the two models, which never harmed the sales or image of either model and was favored by the public. The launch of the Gremlin in Mexico also meant the resurrection of the 232 cu in (3.8 L) I6 engine that was discontinued in 1972. The engine was practically the same as in its final year except for a slightly lower compression ratio (8.3:1 instead of 8.5:1). The advertised output was still the same at 145 gross horsepower at 4,400 revolutions per minute and was restricted to one-barrel carburetors. In contrast, since 1973 all VAM-based Hornets had the 258 cu in (4.2 L) six as the standard and only engine. VAM Gremlins were basic economy cars with a full synchromesh manual 3-speed transmission, heavy-duty clutch, manual four-wheel drum brakes, manual steering, front sway bar, 3.31:1 rear gear ratio, rigid four-bladed cooling fan, collapsible steering column with anti-theft lock, base steering wheel, side marker and hazard lights, column-mounted shifters only, two-tone padded dashboard with silver-colored front surfaces, electric wipers and washers, monaural AM radio, cigarette lighter, front and rear ashtrays, locking glovebox, folding bench seats, two-point front seatbelts, flip-open rear side vents, roof rack, full carpeting with driver's side rubber mat, padded sun visors, sound-insulating cardboard-type headliner, dual coat hooks and round dome light. Factory options for 1974 included a column-mounted automatic transmission, power steering, power drum brakes, heater, parcel shelf, light group, remote-controlled driver and passenger side outside mirrors, sports steering wheel, bright molding package, wheel trim rings, and heavy-duty cooling. All VAM Gremlins used AMC's three-pod instrument cluster from the domestic-built Hornet with a blank in the third gauge position from the factory, which could be equipped with a universal tachometer or clock as dealership options. The introductory year production was 2,137.

==== 1975 ====
The 1975 Gremlin models were upgraded, and along with the improvements to the larger car lines VAM took 9% of the Mexican market. VAM Gremlin interiors now featured individual folding front seats with low backs and new door panels, the "two-tone" dashboard with silver-painted front surfaces was replaced by a color-keyed unit, and a new fuel economy gauge was standard on the third space of the instrument cluster. Manual front disk brakes and electronic ignition were among the mechanical upgrades, while the compression ratio of the engine was dropped to 7.6:1. Both transmissions now came only with a floor-mounted shifter. VAM Gremlins ordered with automatic transmissions now included a heater and power steering at no charge. The exterior featured a variation of AMC's "hockey stick" side decal and a new design for headlight bezels, grille, and parking lights at the front end that AMC originally developed for its Hornet models. Production doubled to over 4,200 VAM Gremlins.

==== 1976 ====
The Gremlin X version was added in 1976 as a separate model rather than an optional package. The X models included VAM's larger 258 cu in (4.2 L) I6, a 6000 RPM tachometer, sports steering wheel, 7.00X14 radial tires, Hurst linkage with T-shaped shifter for the manual transmissions, courtesy lights under the parcel shelf, heater, power steering, tinted windshield, bright molding package (drip rails, wheel arches, rocker panels), wheel trim rings, and an in-house two-color rally stripe that was unique to the Mexican market. The 1976 VAM Gremlin X also came with an interior featuring the "Navajo" pattern cloth upholstery that was optional on AMC's Pacer DL models built for the Canadian and U.S. markets. The base VAM Gremlin now also included luxurious seating with a center armrest that was never available in the U.S. models. Due to the debut of the Gremlin X and its sportier focus, the base Gremlin switched back to the standard column-mounted shifters for either transmission, but keeping the individual seat configuration. Both versions included revised gauges with a 160 km/h speedometer, new side panel designs, longer folding sun visors, and a styled round dome light lens. Sales for 1976 increased to over 6,000 units.

==== 1977 ====
Starting with the 1977 models, all VAM Gremlins were powered by the 258 cu in (4.2 L) I6 regardless of trim level. The exterior featured the shorter new front end clip and rear end treatment as did the U.S. models. The 1977 Gremlin X model included a new digital tachometer and three-point retractable seatbelts, as well as new in-house VAM designs for the seats. The sporty side decal was slightly revised. The seatbelts on the base Gremlin were also changed to three-point units, which were fixed and lacked retractable mechanisms. The option list was expanded with the possibility of ordering a factory air conditioning system for the first time in the VAM line, which was available only in the X model. The previously optional dealership-offered universal air conditioning system remained available for the base model. The VAM Gremlin X (along with the 1977-1979 American ECD, Concord DL four-door equivalent) would be the only VAM car with the 258 I6 engines to be available with a factory air conditioning system, as all other VAM models with it would be 282 cu in (4.6 L) versions. Around 6,800 VAM Gremlins were sold during 1977.

==== 1978 ====
Only a few changes were made to the 1978 VAM Gremlin. The dashboard design was from the new U.S. market Concord being restricted to the unit with black surfaces only (no wood imitation or brushed aluminum versions). For the Gremlin X, there was a new VAM logo on the steering wheel horn button, smaller pointy volcano hubcaps with bright exposed lug nuts, and a new full-length bodyside decal incorporated the "Gremlin X" logo on the rear quarter panel. The sporty model also got the set of four bumper guards as standard equipment. The base model got another set of new hubcaps with exposed lug nuts, but with a flat top instead. Production fell just below 6,000 VAM Gremlins.

==== Second generation ====
VAM Gremlins used the updated body design of the U.S. and Canadian market AMC Spirit two-door sedan, as well as VAM versions of the Spirit Liftback, called the American GT and the Rally AMX. At the time, cars in Mexico took longer to be perceived as outdated than in the US and since the VAM Gremlin came to the public until 1974 instead of 1970, it was still relatively fresh among the Mexican buyers. Aside from this, the model kept a positive image throughout its whole run. It exceeded VAM's sales expectations in its first years. The company originally considered it a temporary low-volume model that would eventually be replaced by the upcoming Pacer model. In the end, the Gremlin stood and became VAM's all-time second best-selling line after the American. For these reasons VAM decided to keep the Gremlin name for the upcoming Spirit sedan model, being a testament to the very favorable image VAM cars in general held in Mexico. This was the third time a case like this happened within the company with Rebel and Matador models keeping the name Rambler Classic and the Hornet the Rambler American name.

=== Australia ===
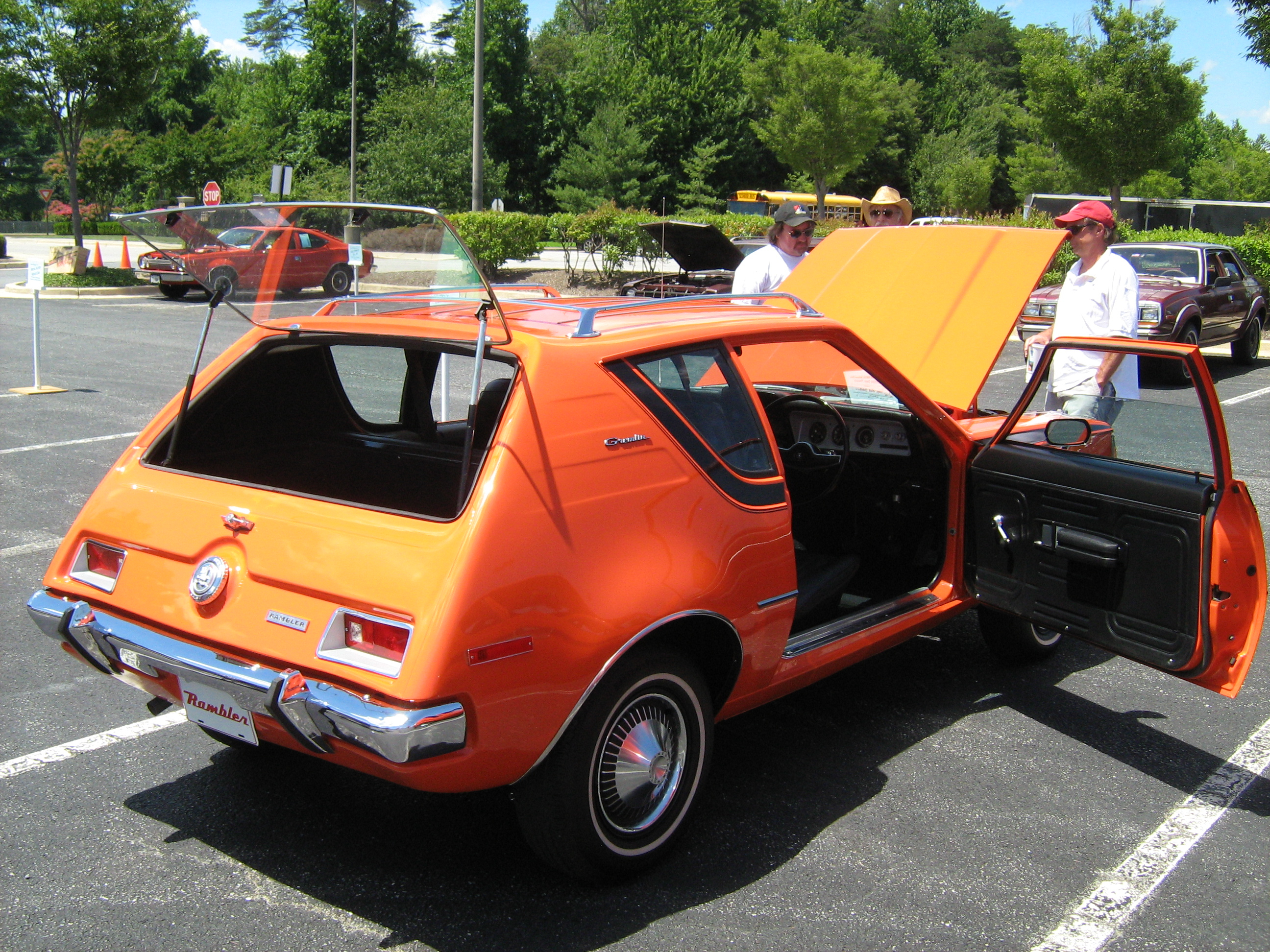
One-off Australian Gremlin, first featured at the 1970 Sydney Motor Show

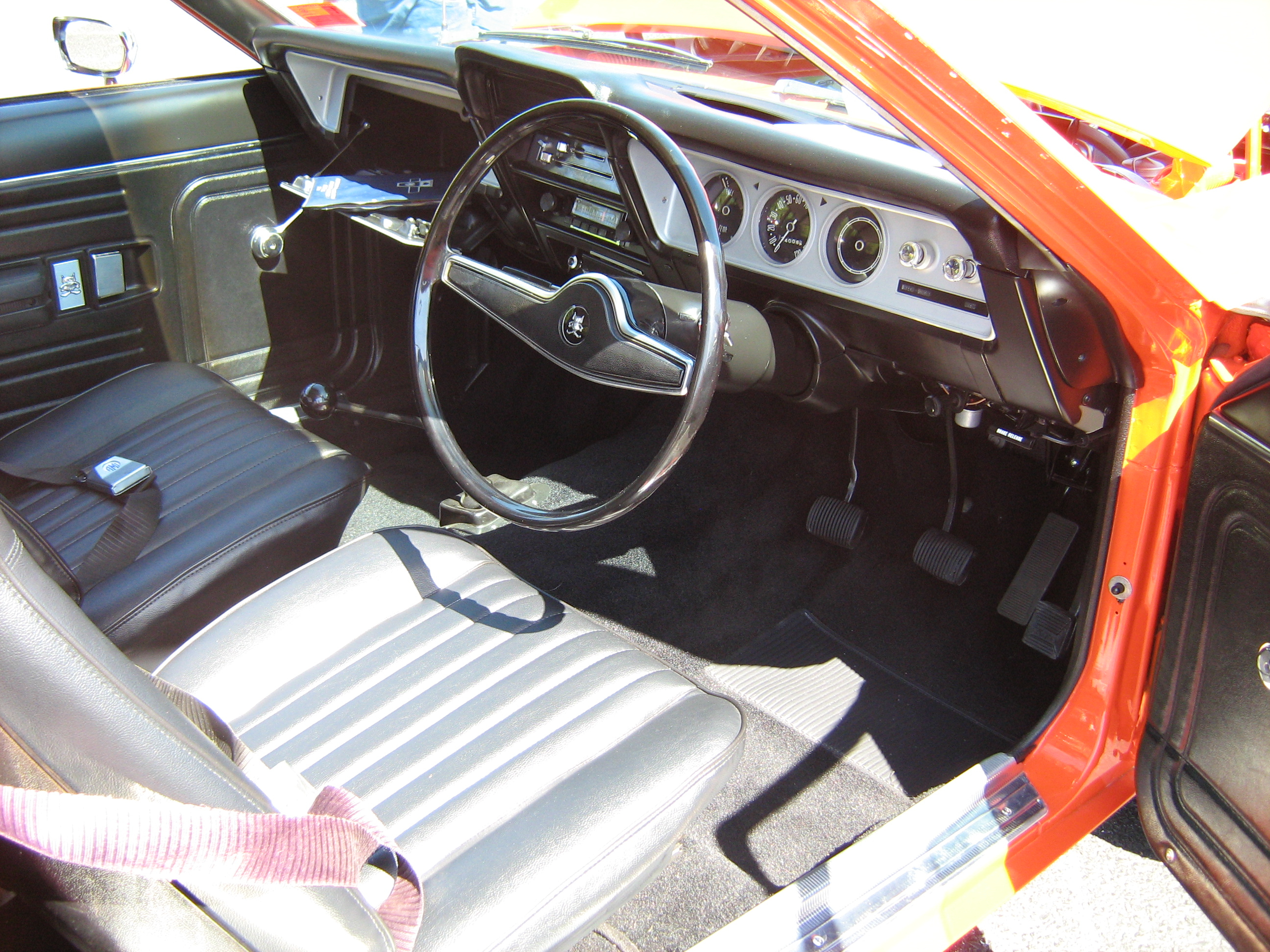
Badged as a "Rambler" this test car was converted from LHD to RHD for evaluation purposes.

AMC exported a fully built Gremlin to its Australian partner, Australian Motor Industries (AMI) of Port Melbourne, Victoria in 1970 for evaluation purposes. (AMI assembled and marketed other AMC models since 1961.) The evaluation model was painted in AMC's "Big Bad Orange" and was converted from left-hand drive to right-hand drive by Sydney Toyota dealer Bill Buckle Pty Ltd. The car featured AMC's 232 cu in (3.8 L) I6 engine and a three-speed manual transmission. The car was presented at the 1970 Sydney Motor Show to gauge interest and test the market.

The car was featured on the front cover of the November 1970 issue of Australia's top motoring magazine, Wheels magazine. The magazine's review pointed to the likelihood that the "local content" requirements would force the price up to that of the high-priced, Australian-assembled Hornet, and probably price the car out of the market.

For marketing purposes, it was branded as a "Rambler Gremlin" in keeping with the use of the Rambler marque for all AMC vehicles sold in Australia despite that Rambler as a brand was retired in the United States at the end of the 1969 model year. However, no Gremlin models were put into production in Australia.

Right-hand-drive Gremlins were imported into Australia by U.S. servicemen.

=== Switzerland ===
Beginning in 1970 Zurich automotive importer J.H Heller AG began importing American Motors vehicles, specifically the Javelin, Gremlin and later the Pacer. Swiss market vehicles were shipped from AMC's Canadian plant.

=== United Kingdom ===
American Motors vehicles were exported to the United Kingdom during the 1960s and 1970s and sold by Rambler Motors (A.M.C.) Ltd in London with dealers in London, Yorks, Kent, and Worcester. While earlier models such as the Rambler Classic, Rebel, Ambassador, and Matador had been exported as completed factory right-hand-drive vehicles, only left-hand-drive Gremlins were exported to the United Kingdom. A British company called C.T. Wooler, in Andover, Hampshire had been in the business for a long time converting LHD cars to RHD and entered into an agreement with AMC to convert AMC vehicles. Wooler converted Gremlins as well as AMC Pacers and Jeeps.

== Hurst Rescue System 1 ==
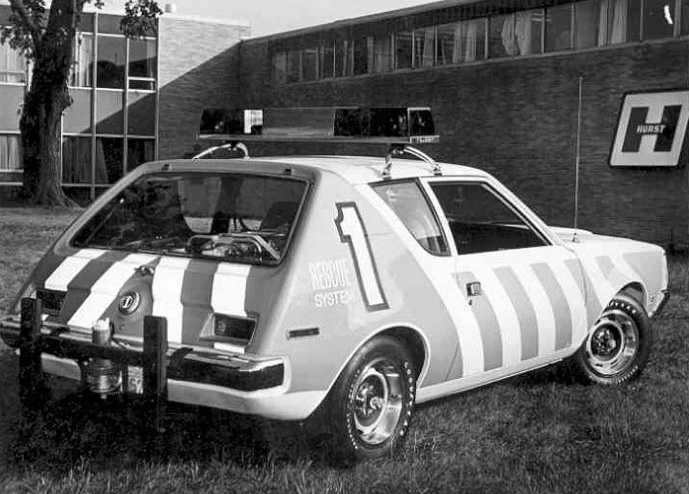
1973 Hurst Rescue System 1

Between 1972 and 1974, Hurst Performance marketed "a highway safety vehicle" for emergency services, as well as a compact alternative to trucks for motorsport race tracks. The "Hurst Rescue System 1" was based on the AMC Gremlin and designed to quickly assist vehicle extrication of crash victims. The vehicle came with the "Hurst Rescue Tool", commonly known as "The Jaws of Life", winch, stretcher, and firefighting and first aid supplies. The vehicle also included push bumpers and a 25-gallon water tank. The price for this fully equipped rescue vehicle was between $11,000 to $13,000.

=== Police ===
A 1975 Gremlin was used as an experimental police vehicle by the Houston Police Department's Traffic Bureau, but this did not result in fleet orders.

== Experimental cars ==
The Gremlin proved a popular testbed for experiments with alternative fuels. Many universities converted them to run on natural gas, hydrogen, and electric power.

=== Hydrogen ===
In 1972 University of California, Los Angeles researchers won a nationwide Urban Vehicle Design Competition when they modified a 1972 AMC Gremlin to run on hydrogen. The lessons learned are still useful today. The engine was a converted Ford 351 cu in (5.8 L) V8 noted for its volumetric efficiency. Lacking sophisticated electronics and injection systems, the carburetor was a modified propane unit and the 100-litre (26.4 US gal) "thermos"-type hydrogen tank gave the Gremlin a range of 160 miles (257 km). Tests indicated that the car would not only meet the scheduled 1976 vehicle United States emission standards, but also actually emit slightly cleaner air than it took in. As part of the 1972 Urban Vehicle Design Competition, UCLA engineering students also enlarged the side glass area above the rear wheels for improved visibility, designed a roll cage which projected through the Gremlin's roof to double as a roof rack, and designed 5 MPH bumpers with an environmentally-friendly energy-absorbing popcorn core, covered with a recycled-tire tread surface. In 1984, UCLA's first hydrogen-powered car was sold for one dollar to the William F. Harrah Automobile Museum in Reno, Nevada. In 2010, the car was available on an auction site.

=== Alternative fuels ===
Other experiments used AMC Gremlins. To evaluate non-petroleum fuel and measure mechanical wear under mostly short city driving, a 1970 Gremlin with AMC's 232 cu in (3.8 L) engine operated successfully on methanol for ten years and 46,250 miles (74,432 km).

The broadest range of fuel tests were conducted by the United States Department of Energy (DOE) labs in Bartlesville, Oklahoma. Engineers estimated the performance and fuel economy of 1977 Gremlin Xs operating on ordinary gasoline, a variety of wide boiling range fuels (naphtha, kerosene, etc.), as well as two alcohols, ethanol and methanol.

=== Electric ===
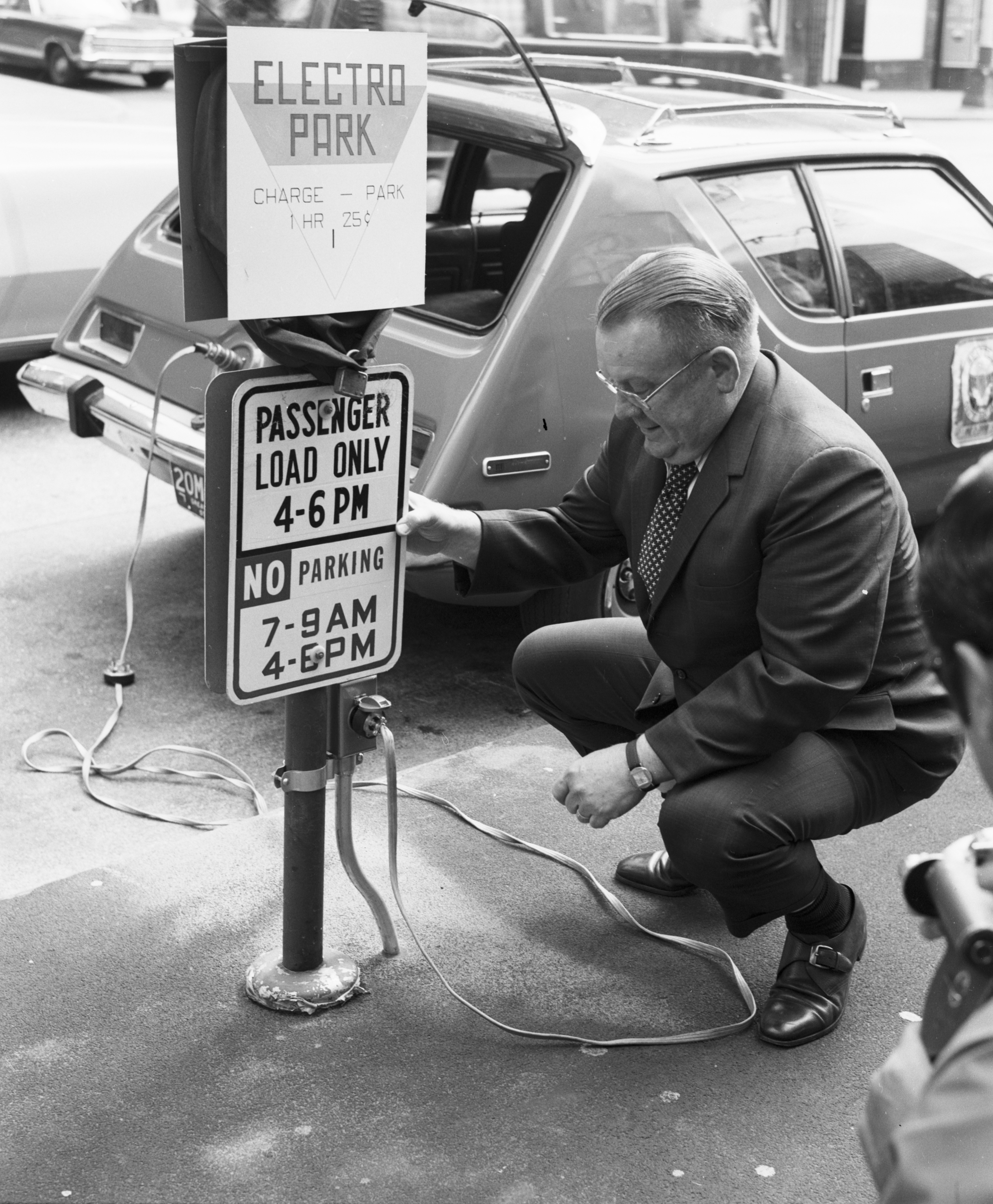
Seattle City Light Superintendent Gordon Vickery at charging station for the electric Gremlin

The Electric Fuel Propulsion Company (EFP) of Ferndale, Michigan, produced a number of electric cars including the AMC Gremlin based, two-passenger X-144. Introduced in 1973 it featured a 20 horsepower (15 kW) direct current motor fueled by a 144-volt cobalt-lead storage batteries designed to reduce the formation of harmful gases during recharging, as well as a regular 12-volt battery to operate the cars lights, horn, and heater blower. Performance was claimed to be similar to a base gasoline Gremlin, including a top speed of 60 mph (97 km/h), but with a calculated lower cost per mile for the X-144 over five years and 20,000 miles (32,187 km) of use.

Inventor "Cotton" Whatley of Wichita Falls, Texas, offered an unknown number of modified electric Gremlins for sale through various dealerships between 1973 and 1978. Whatley's Gremlin Electric had a top speed of 50 miles per hour (80 km/h) and a maximum range of 50 miles (80 km).

== Exhibition ==
Engineers at Coleman Products Corporation in Coleman, Wisconsin, created a non-drivable plexiglas Gremlin as a demonstrator of the placement and function of electrical wiring harnesses.

== Concept Gremlins ==
=== Gremlin Voyager ===
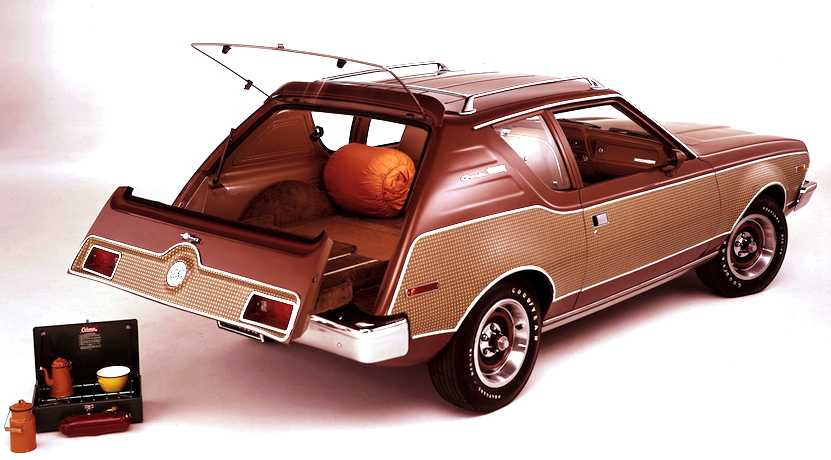
AMC Gremlin Voyager concept

In 1972, AMC developed a prototype "Gremlin Voyager" with a slide out rear panel called "Grem-Bin". The car was a production Gremlin with a proposed "shelf" design to make cargo loading easier since the standard rear hatch glass swung upward, but the car did not have tailgate panel that opened downward. The show car featured a modified grille and was finished in a dark brown metallic color with basket-weave trim on the bodysides and rear panel. The idea was mostly to gain attention at car shows and the car has survived.

=== XP prototype ===
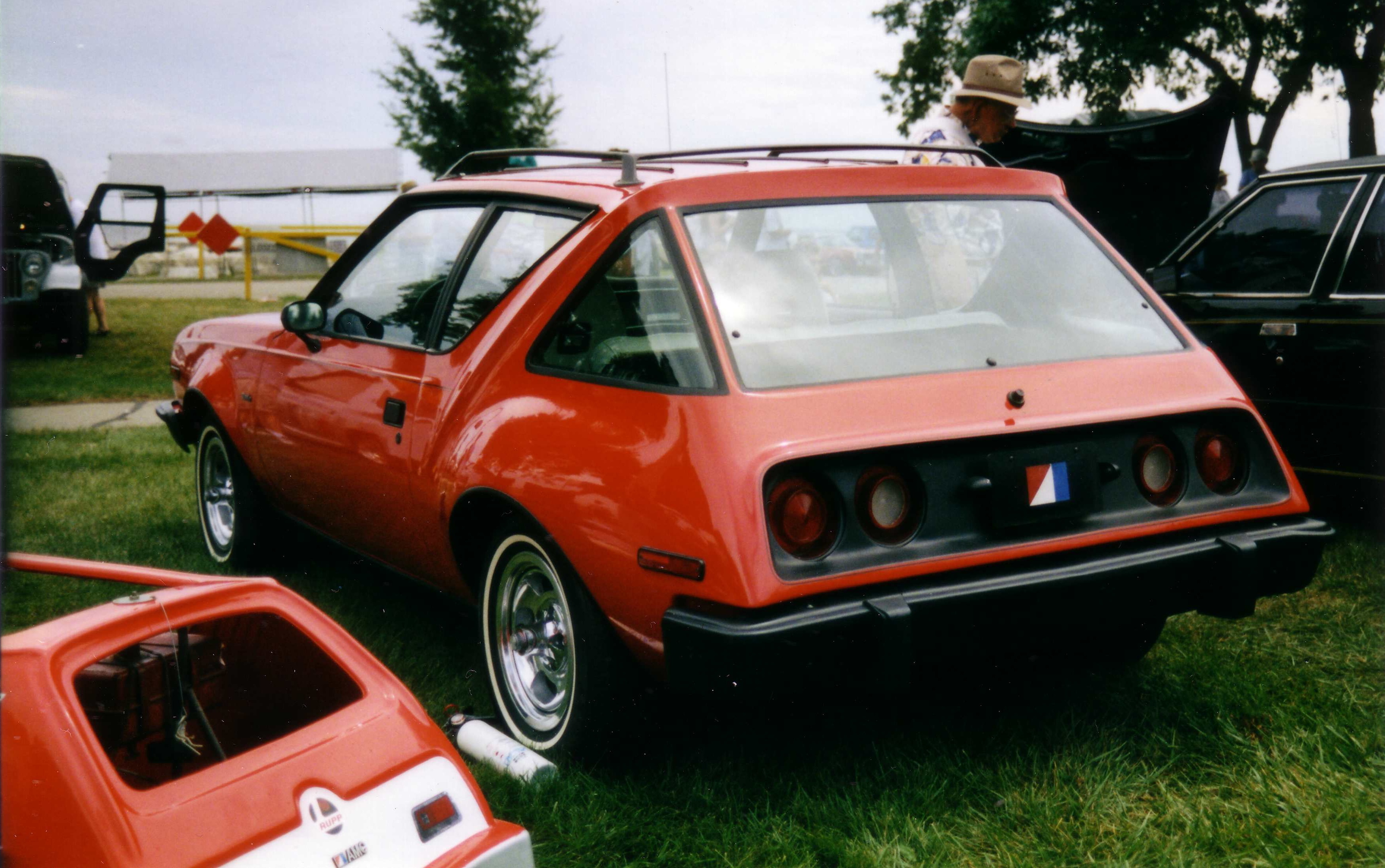
AMC Gremlin XP concept car

In 1974, a production car was modified and dubbed the Gremlin XP prototype. It features a larger glass hatchback and additional side-quarter windows. A pronounced crease starts at the mid-body and wraps over the roof, while the rear quarter panels feature bulges around the wheel wells. The rear panel features a recessed, blacked-out area with four lights. The design of the concept car improved visibility around the Gremlin's original wide C-pillar.

=== G-II prototype ===
The AMC design team was aware that the stub-ended subcompact would need updating that incorporated more conventional styling. Another 1974 Gremlin was modified with a front end from the Hornet. The G-II concept car received a special blacked-out grille, but the most radical design feature was its fastback roofline. The car featured a full glass hatchback, 1973-1974 Javelin tail lamps in the blacked-out rear valance panel, body-color bumpers, and slotted aluminum wheels. This concept car turned out to be similar to the Gremlin's replacement, the liftback Spirit model introduced for the 1979 model year.

=== Concept 80 ===
In 1977, American Motors presented six show cars to illustrate the automaker's commitment to smaller, fuel-efficient vehicles for the 1980s. Three of them, the "Concept I", "Concept II", and "Concept Grand Touring" represented new subcompact designs.

- The Concept I car combined a "wedge-design" with a short hood, a low body beltline, a steeply raked windshield, and an expanded glass area. The front featured a mesh grille, "rally-type" parking lights, and rectangular headlamps. The rear end was squared off, featuring large rear quarter windows to eliminate blind spots. The rear panel incorporated a characteristic continental tire bulge.
- The Concept II design was another Gremlin replacement proposal featuring integral soft bumpers and headlamps concealed by flush sliding doors. A pronounced center structural "Targa-band" was designed to add strength to the roof. The squared-off rear end featured a glass hatchback.
- The Concept Grand Touring was a larger luxury hatchback designed for four passengers. The interior was appointed in leather and corduroy upholstery, with luxury appointments and deep-pile carpeting. The front end featured a "venturi" grille with rally-type lights. The rear side windows were "opera" recessed and surrounded by a vinyl cover that ran over the rear quarter of the roof. The Concept GT car had genuine wire wheels.

Design elements from the AMC show cars "Concept II" and "Concept GT" were incorporated into the Gremlin's replacement, the AMC Spirit, introduced in 1979.

== Marketplace and reception ==
The 1970s were one of the most volatile periods in the history of the automobile industry which is renowned for its ups and downs. A total of 671,475 Gremlins were sold in the United States and Canada, making it the most popular single generation body style/chassis produced by AMC (other models, such as the Rambler and even Hornet, have higher production numbers, but consisted of more than one chassis design and body style in the case of the Rambler, multiple body styles for the Hornet).

A book about the popular history of the 1970s introduces it as the decade of "pet rocks, shag carpets, platform shoes, and the AMC Gremlin." It is among the cars that people who were in high school in the late 1970s and early 1980s would be familiar with because it was one of the first cars they drove and among most often seen in student parking lots. Kiplinger's personal finance magazine, Changing Times, listed the AMC Gremlin as first among the best subcompact used cars as "selected by top mechanics for good value, good service." Five years after the Gremlin's introduction, the mechanics liked the six-cylinder engine and most preferred automatic transmission. Comments included, "I have one. It's the greatest. I own one with a 304 V-8 engine. Have no trouble outside of normal maintenance."

During the early 1970s American cars "are remembered far more often for their power than their style, and ... throughout the decade, the character of cars became blurred. Only a handful of cars had real personalities...." the AMC Gremlin was one of them, "a pioneering hatchback". According to Tom and Ray Magliozzi, "it's easy to criticize this car now, because just about any car from the early '70s would look bad next to today's cars. They had no fuel injection, no independent suspension, no air bags, no anti-lock brakes, no nothing! But compared with the other cars of its era, the Gremlin wasn't bad."

Officially discontinued after the 1978 model year, the Gremlin was restyled, including a new model that featured a sloping liftback for 1979 and the model line renamed the AMC Spirit. This restyled continuation of the familiar chopped-tail two-door and the new hatch coupe caused sales to increase to 52,478 units for 1979. The original "Kammback" body style continued in production until 1982 as the Spirit Sedan with larger rear side windows. The basic design was also used for the small AMC Eagle Kammback in 1981 and 1982.

American Motors lacked the funds to come up with a separate platform for a sub-compact car, so it did something different with an existing model, and "although car snobs make fun of the chop-tailed Gremlin, it was a huge sales hit." The authors of the book 365 Cars You Must Drive "that any self-respecting auto enthusiast just has to know and experience from the driver's seat" describe that "driving a Gremlin isn't about the drive; it's about being seen in one, making a statement that you dig the mid-1970s, and also wouldn't be caught dead in something normal." An article published by Time in 2007 included the Gremlin as one of "The 50 Worst Cars of All Time", describing it as an AMC Hornet with the rear end whacked off, and criticizing its exterior proportions, with a long low snout, long front overhang, and a truncated tail, "like the tail snapped off a salamander".

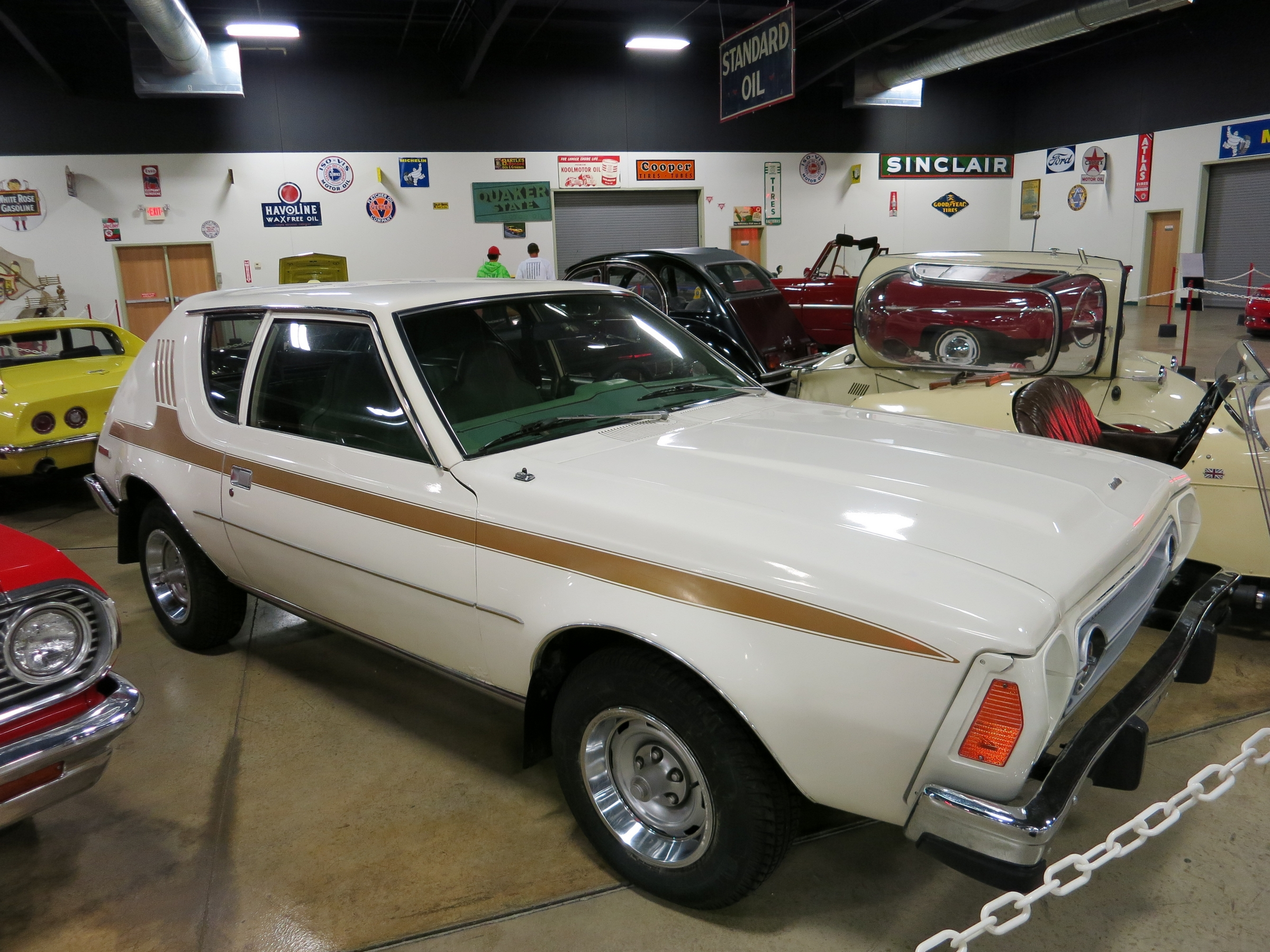
1976 AMC Gremlin X at the Tupelo Automobile Museum

In 2007, Popular Science magazine included the 13.4-foot (4.1 m) AMC Gremlin as one of six historic cars that took "Small Steps to a Smart Future" in a special issue about the "Future of the Car: Efficiency".

The Gremlin has a following among old car hobbyists and collectors of historic vehicles. In some cases, the Gremlin enjoys "a cult-like following in today's collectible car market". In 2007, Business Week reported that 1970s cars such as the Gremlin were increasingly attractive to buyers, and an insurance provider for collector-car owners reported that values were rising at that time.

In light of rising gasoline prices, the Gremlin offers a relatively economical alternative to muscle cars and the more massive American cars of its era-especially for buyers leaning toward the eccentric. AMC said the Gremlin got "the best gas mileage of any production car made in America", and its 21-US-gallon (79 L; 17 imp gal) gas tank allowed 500 miles (805 km) or more between fill-ups.

=== Future U.S. presidents ===
Two former U.S. presidents drove AMC Gremlins before entering politics.

"Bill Clinton drove the back roads of Northwest Arkansas in his green AMC Gremlin" during his 1974 campaign for the only attempt he made for a seat in the United States Congress.

An AMC Gremlin with a Levi interior was owned by the George H. W. Bush family and driven by George W. Bush in 1973 while getting his Master of Business Administration (MBA) degree.

=== Hot Wheels model ===
Hot Wheels designer Paul Tam created a model of a Gremlin with six wheels for the 1972 Hot Wheels series, called "Open Fire", with the extra pair of wheels under a large, exposed metal engine. Other than the engine, extra wheels, and elongated hood, "the Open Fire retains many accurate styling details of the Gremlin. Later on, in the Flying Colors range, Hot Wheels made the Gremlin Grinder: A rear-jacked Gremlin with a huge open engine that was produced through the mid-1970s in either green or chrome. The last one was a stock car or rally car custom version of the Gremlin that was first made in the early 1980s and is still popular today, "The Greased Gremlin".

== See also ==
- Nebraska v. One 1970 2-Door Sedan Rambler (Gremlin)
