= Air Sickness Bag Virtual Museum =

The Air Sickness Bag Virtual Museum is a collection of 3,112 air sickness bags collected by museum curator Steven J. Silberberg. The museum is entirely online, with photographs of the various air sickness bags; however, the actual collection is stored at Silberberg's residence. Silberberg himself has stated that he has never flown long distances.
