= FSJ =

FSJ may refer to:

- Area of freedom, security and justice (AFSJ)
- Fellowship of Saint John
- Football Association of Yugoslavia (Serbo-Croatian: Fudbalski Savez Jugoslavije)
- Football Association of Serbia and Montenegro, known from 1992 to 2003 as the Football Association of Yugoslavia (Serbo-Croatian: Fudbalski Savez Jugoslavije)
- Foreign Service Journal
- Full Size Jeep
- James Fisher & Sons, a British marine engineering firm
- Voluntary social year (German: Freiwilliges Soziales Jahr)
