= Jeep Cherokee (SJ) =

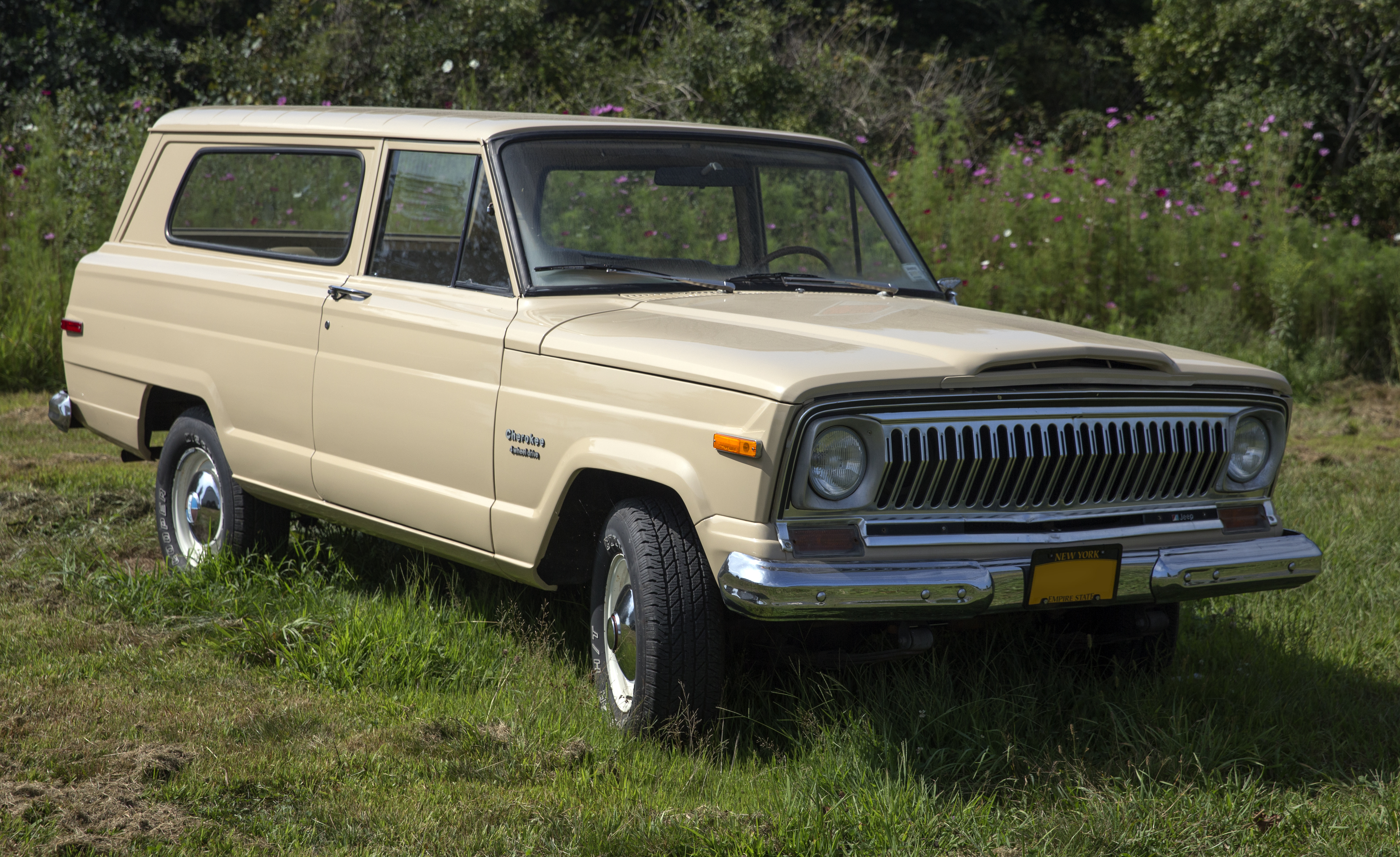
- 1975 Jeep Cherokee

Overview
- Manufacturer: Jeep (American Motors)
- Production: 1974–1983
- Assembly: United States: Toledo, Ohio (Toledo Complex); Canada: Brampton, Ontario (Brampton Assembly Plant); Argentina: Córdoba (IKA); Australia: Rocklea, Queensland; Mexico: Mexico City (VAM)
- Designer: Brooks Stevens

Body and chassis
- Class: Full-size SUV
- Body style: 2-door wagon 4-door wagon Cherokee Chief
- Layout: Front-engine, rear-wheel drive / four-wheel drive
- Platform: SJ
- Related: Jeep Wagoneer (SJ); Jeep Gladiator (SJ)

Powertrain
- Engine: 258 cu in (4.2 L) AMC I6; 360 cu in (5.9 L) AMC V8 2-barrel; 360 cu in (5.9 L) AMC V8 4-barrel; 401 cu in (6.6 L) AMC V8 4-barrel
- Transmission: 4-speed manual; 3-speed automatic

Dimensions
- Wheelbase: 108.7 in (2,761 mm)
- Length: 186.4 in (4,735 mm)
- Width: 74.8–78.7 in (1,900–1,999 mm)
- Height: 66.4 in (1,687 mm)
- Curb weight: 4,514 lb (2,048 kg)

Chronology
- Successor: Jeep Cherokee (XJ); Jeep Grand Cherokee (ZJ)

See also Jeep Cherokee for other models using this name.

The SJ series Jeep Cherokee is a full-size SUV that was produced from 1974 through 1983 by Jeep. It was based on the Wagoneer that was originally designed by Brooks Stevens in 1963.

== Development ==
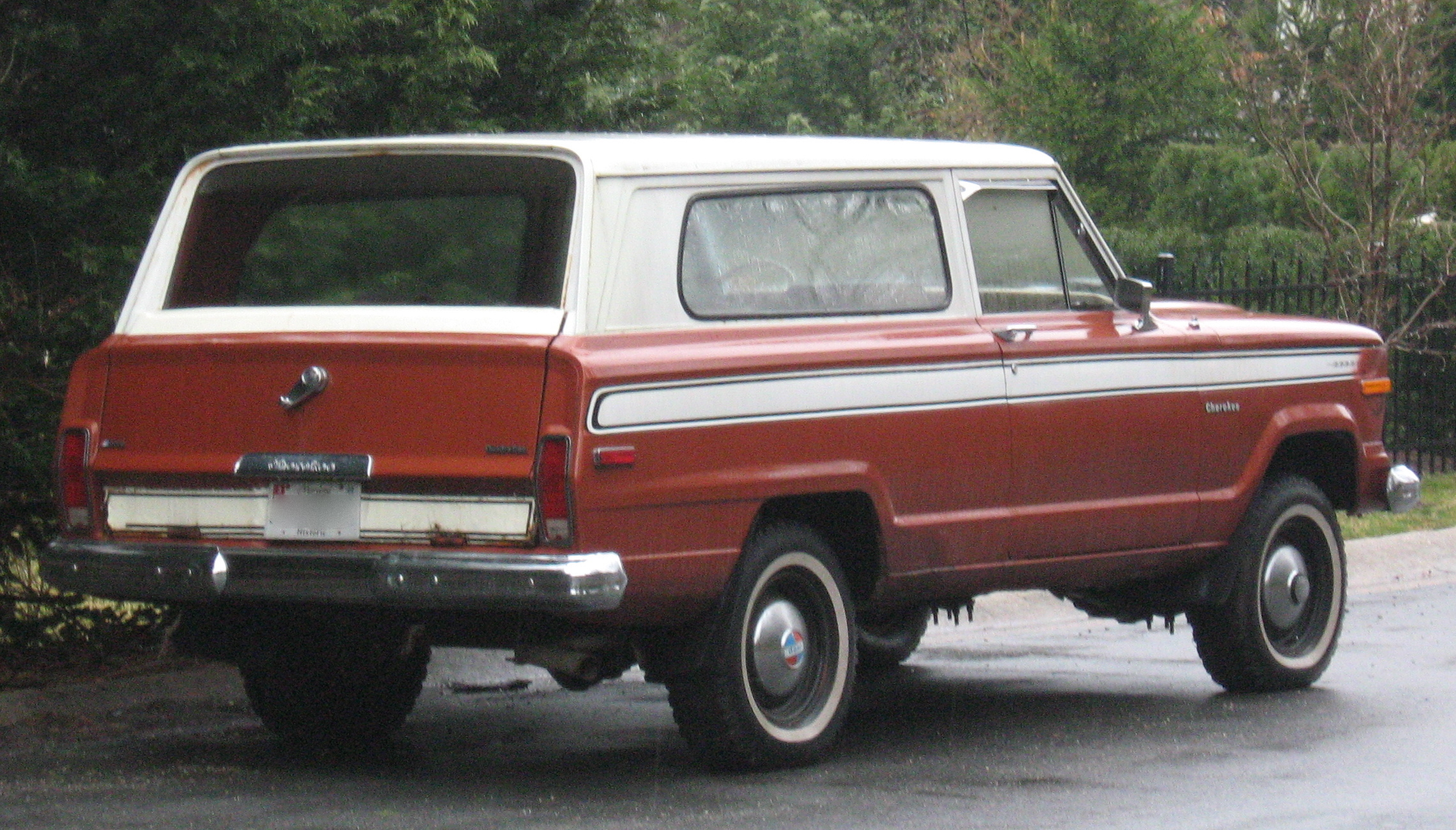
1974 Jeep Cherokee, base model

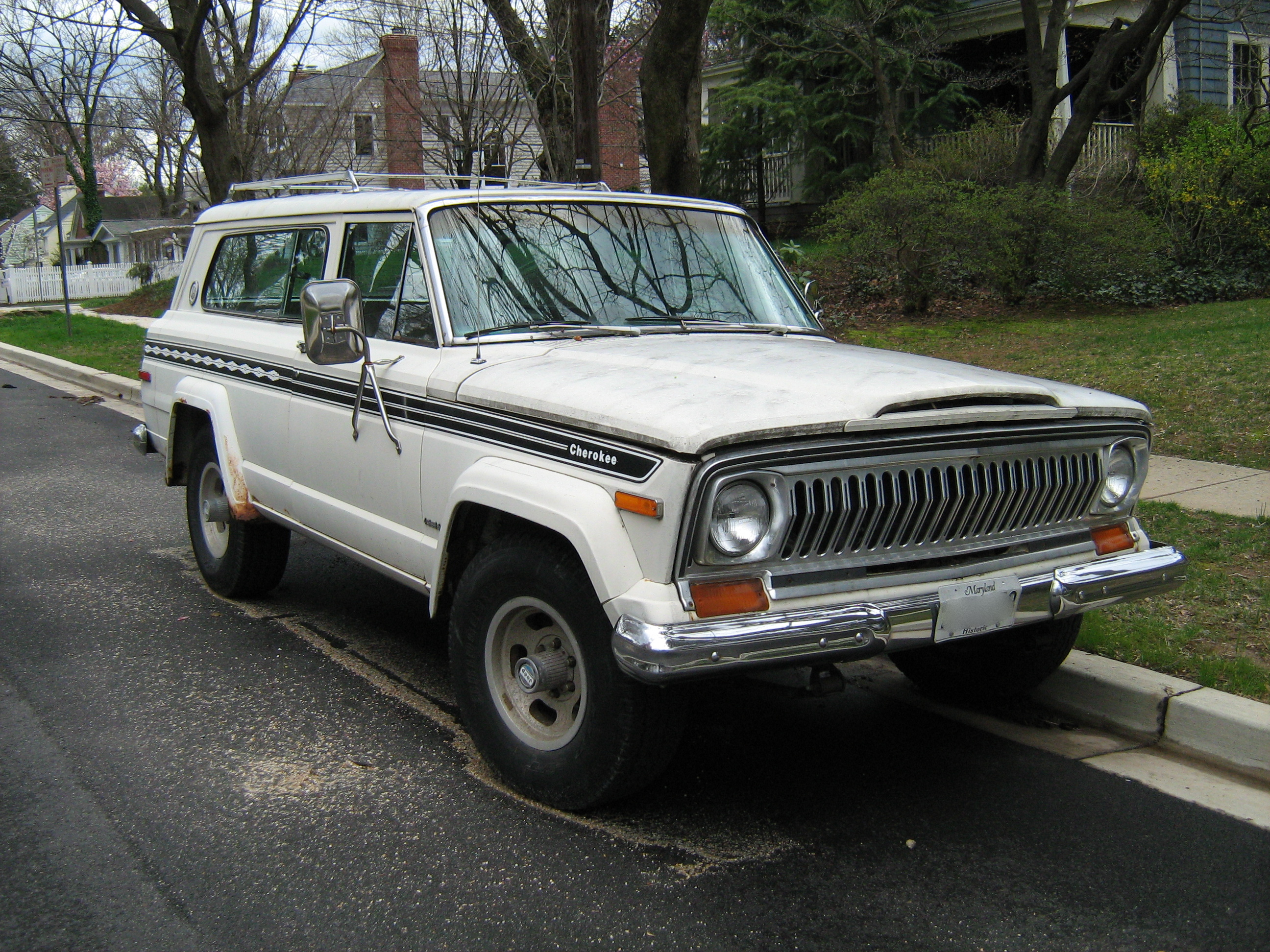
Wide-track Jeep Cherokee

The Cherokee was a redesigned reintroduction of a two-door body style, with a single fixed rear side window with an optional flip-out section. Previously, a two-door version had been available in the Jeep Wagoneer line from 1963 to 1967, although this had the same pillar and window configuration as the four-door Wagoneer.

The Cherokee was marketed as the "sporty" two-door variant of Jeep's station wagon. The term "Sport Utility Vehicle" appears for the first time in the 1974 Cherokee sales brochure. A four-door was not added to the lineup until 1977.

The initial, 1974 Cherokees were only available in the standard "narrow track" configuration as base models (Model 16), or top-of-the-line S models (Model 17). Later, the trim levels of the Cherokee included the S (Sport; 1974–), Chief (1976–1983), Golden Eagle (1978–1979), Golden Hawk, and Laredo (1980–1983). Golden Eagle and Golden Hawk were graphics packages; the Laredo was more of an upholstery package. For the final year only, in 1983 a new “Pioneer” package was standard on the four-door and optional on the two-door. Cherokee Chief and Laredo packages were still available, but only on widewheel two-door models.

== Performance ==
Engine choices consisted of AMC I6 or V8 powerplants. When it was equipped with the net 215 hp (160 kW; 218 PS) 401 cu in (6.6 L) AMC V8 engine, it would outrun other 4x4s in its class, and, with 3.07:1 highway gearing, could reach speeds in excess of 100 miles per hour (161 km/h) (early models had 120 mph speedometers). A range of AMC engines were offered: the 110 hp (82 kW; 112 PS) 258 cu in (4.2 L) inline six-cylinder, a 175 hp (130 kW; 177 PS) 360 cu in (5.9 L) V8 with two-barrel carburetor, a 195 hp (145 kW; 198 PS) four-barrel 360, the 401 cu in (6.6 L) V8, and even a Zeitgeist/Peugeot turbo diesel, albeit very rare. The durable 401 had a forged crankshaft and forged connecting rods, in addition to the high nickel content block of the other AMC V8s. The 401 was discontinued at the end of 1978. After acquiring AMC in 1987, Chrysler kept the 360 cu in (5.9 L) V8 in production until 1991 for the Jeep Grand Wagoneer.

The SJ Cherokee - along with the Wagoneer and J-Truck - continues to hold the record for the largest engine ever offered in a Jeep, with the 401's displacement surpassing that of even the SRT-8 Grand Cherokee's 392 cu in (6.4 L) Hemi.

== Mechanicals ==
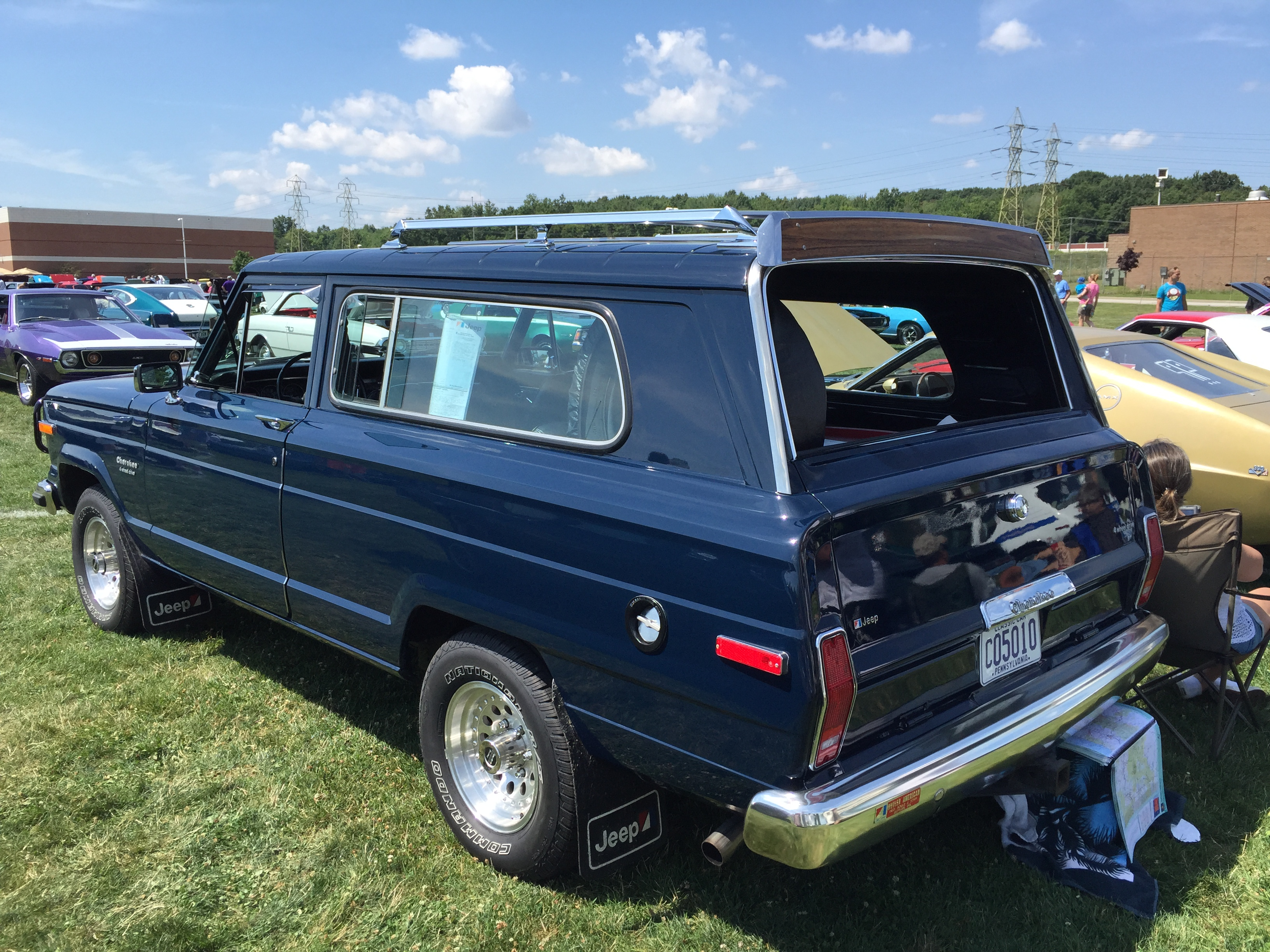
1983 Jeep Cherokee 2-door

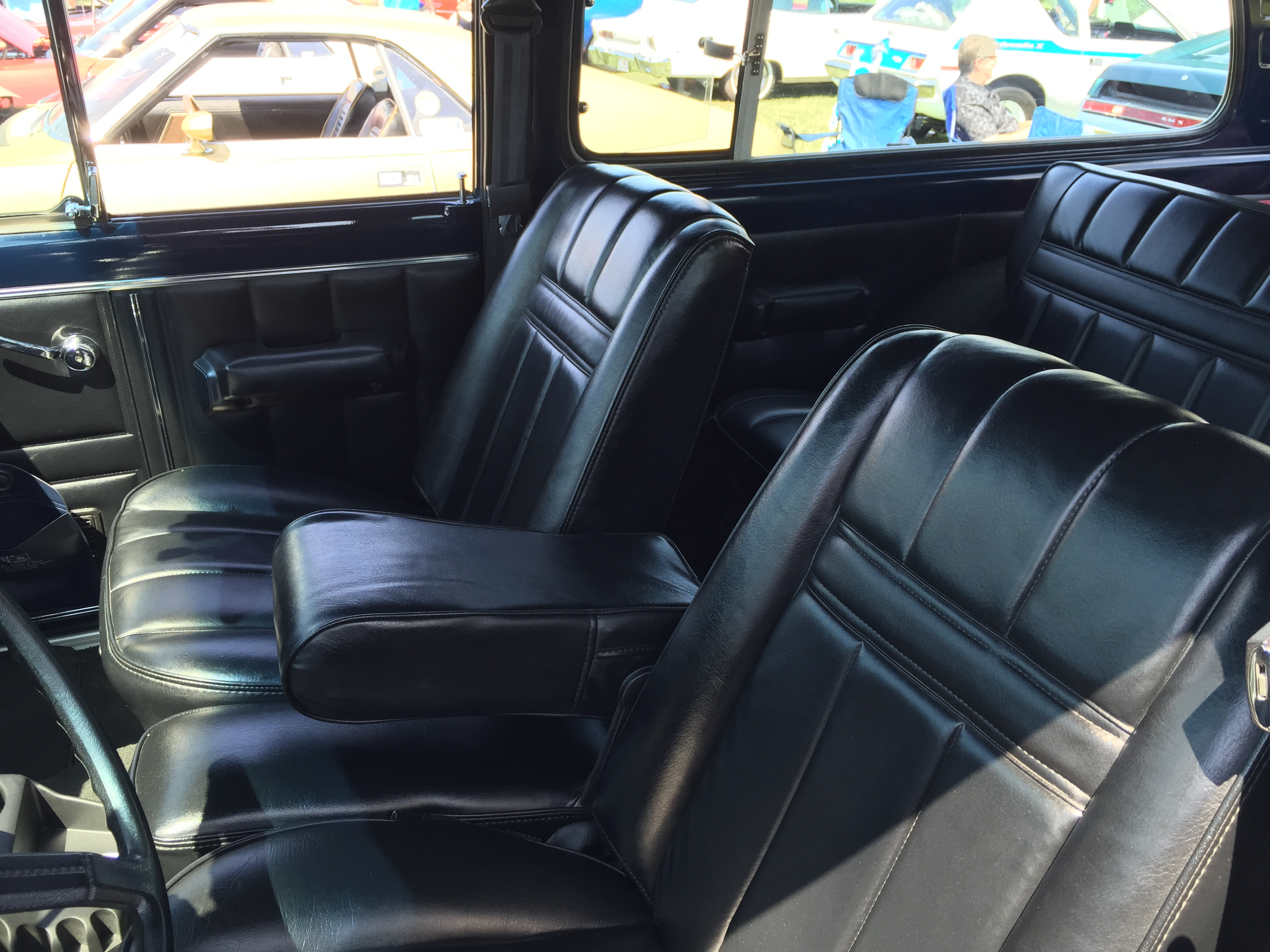
1983 Jeep Cherokee interior

A T-18/T-18a four-speed manual gearbox was standard for all years, while through 1979 the General Motors' Turbo-Hydramatic TH400, more commonly fitted to 3/4- and 1-ton trucks rather than SUVs, was optional. For comparison, GM’s own SUV, the Chevy Blazer, used the TH350 automatic. After 1979, the TH400 was replaced by the Chrysler TorqueFlite 727.

A gear-driven Dana 20 transfer case with 2.03:1 low range was standard with the manual gearbox (which had a much lower first gear of 6.3:1), while the TH400 automatics received the permanent four-wheel-drive QuadraTrac system. The chain-driven, aluminum QuadraTrac was advanced at the time. It included a vacuum-operated center differential lock. The transfer case was offset, allowing it to sit just above the frame to avoid obstacles, and the chain itself is larger than nearly any other. A test by Petersen's Complete Book of Four-Wheel Drive reported that the Cherokee was the only vehicle unable to be dynoed because the transfer case would not allow the rear wheels to spin, unlike the other full-time four-wheel-drive vehicles being tested. In the off-road test, the same held true. This transfer case was also employed successfully in Baja races, for example by Roger Mears in the Baja 1000. A 2.57:1 low range was optional on QuadraTrac.

In 1976, the Cherokee Chief package was introduced. Aside from trim changes, this model received larger fenders and wider axles, allowing larger tires to be fitted to further improve off-road ability. Four-door models were not available with "wide-track" axles. The Golden Eagle package was introduced in 1979. It was the same as the Chief but had denim interior upholstery, gold painted steel wheels and distinctive exterior trim that included a large gold eagle decal on the hood. In 1980 the high end Laredo package was introduced.

Dana 44 axles were used both in the front and the rear at least through 1979. Brake hardware was mostly General Motors equipment (sourced from the straight axle 1/2 ton 4x4 light duty truck and SUV line including the six lug wheels), with disc brakes up front (optional on earlier models) and drum brakes in the rear.

All Cherokees had semi-elliptical leaf springs in the front and rear.

== International markets ==
The Cherokee was marketed in left and right hand drive countries (such as the UK and Australia). Main production of the Cherokee was in Toledo, Ohio.

=== Australia ===
The SJ Cherokees were assembled in Brisbane, Australia from 1981. The initial units were fully built imports that needed to be partly disassembled for right-hand-drive. Later Jeep Australia began full assembly of the SUV and J20 trucks from knock-down kits. Problems with spare parts, quality control, the limited capacity of the assembly plant (a maximum of 60 Cherokee/J20 vehicles per month), and lack of dealer support (many were multi-franchise stores so Jeeps were not their focus) were disadvantages to maintaining market share.

Australian tariff regulations defined "real" 4x4 vehicles as having a separate frame and chassis construction and had a 25% duty and no quota restrictions, while vehicles with an integral chassis were classified as "cars" and subject to both an import quantity restriction and a 57.5% tax. This meant that assembly of the SJ models continued even after the modern, unibody XJ compact model had been introduced by AMC. All Cherokee assembly was discontinued in Australia by 1985, three years after the SJ had been replaced in the U.S. by the XJ.

=== Argentina ===
In Argentina, the Cherokee was manufactured by Industrias Kaiser Argentina, who renamed the SUV the Jeep Gladiator. It was offered with a single type of engine, the locally built Tornado inline-six, and was equipped with 3-speed manual transmission. Later Jeeps received an updated and more powerful version of this engine with seven main bearings, called the "Torino."

== Awards ==
In February 1974, the Jeep Cherokee was the first vehicle to earn Four Wheeler Magazine's "Achievement Award" that later became the annual "Four Wheeler of the Year" recognition.

== See also ==
- Jeep Wagoneer (SJ)
