= Vintage Grill & Car Museum =

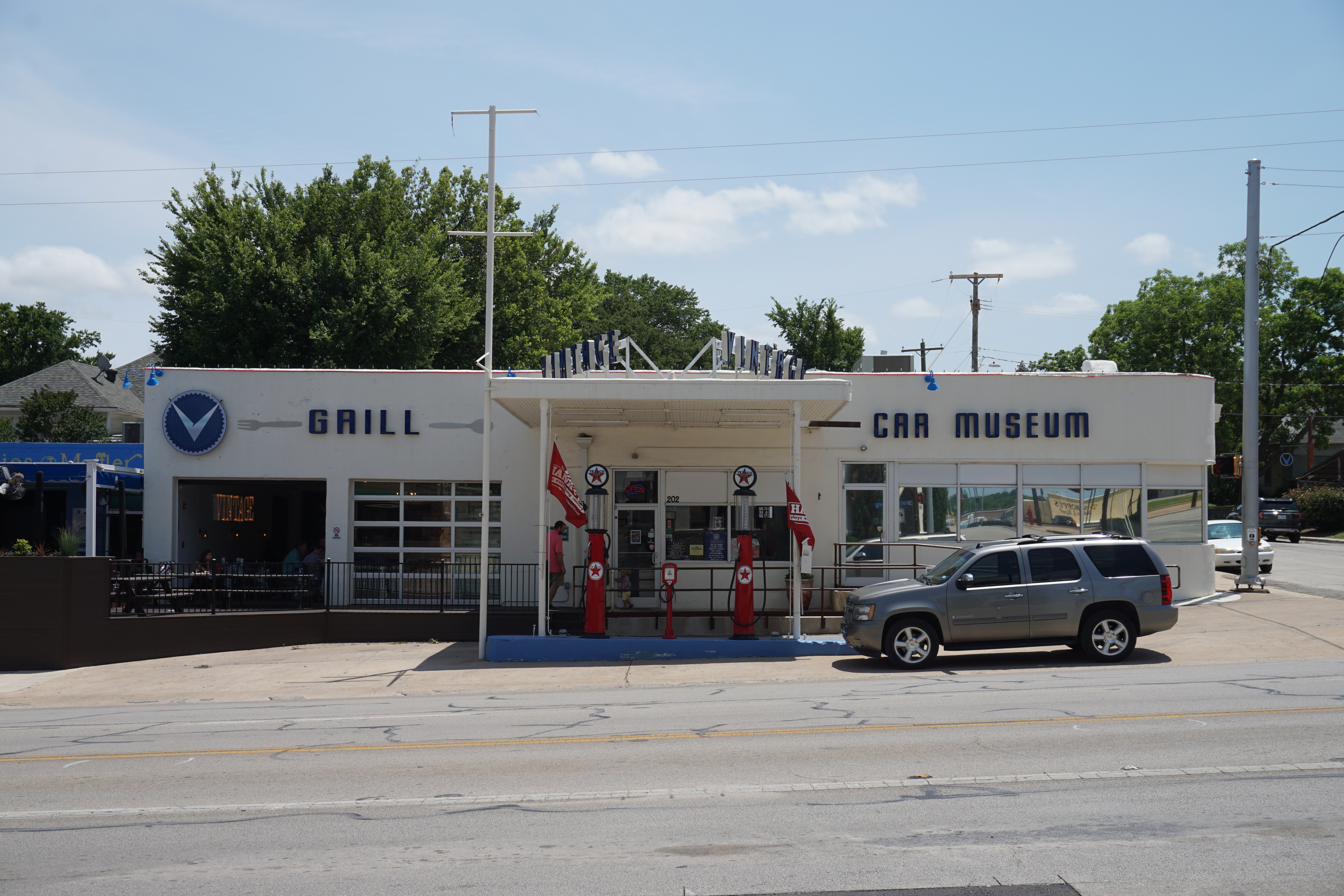
- Exterior of the Vintage Grill & Car Museum

- Location within Texas
- Established: 2015
- Location: Weatherford, Texas
- Coordinates: 32.758619°N 97.795287°W
- Type: Automobile museum, restaurant
- Curator: Terry Mann
- Owner: Tom Moncrief
- Website: vintageautomuseum.com

Vintage Grill & Car Museum is a car museum and restaurant in Weatherford, Texas. It is located at 202 Fort Worth Highway, where it occupies a build from the 1930s that previously housed the McDavid Oldsmobile car dealership and a gas station.

== Museum ==
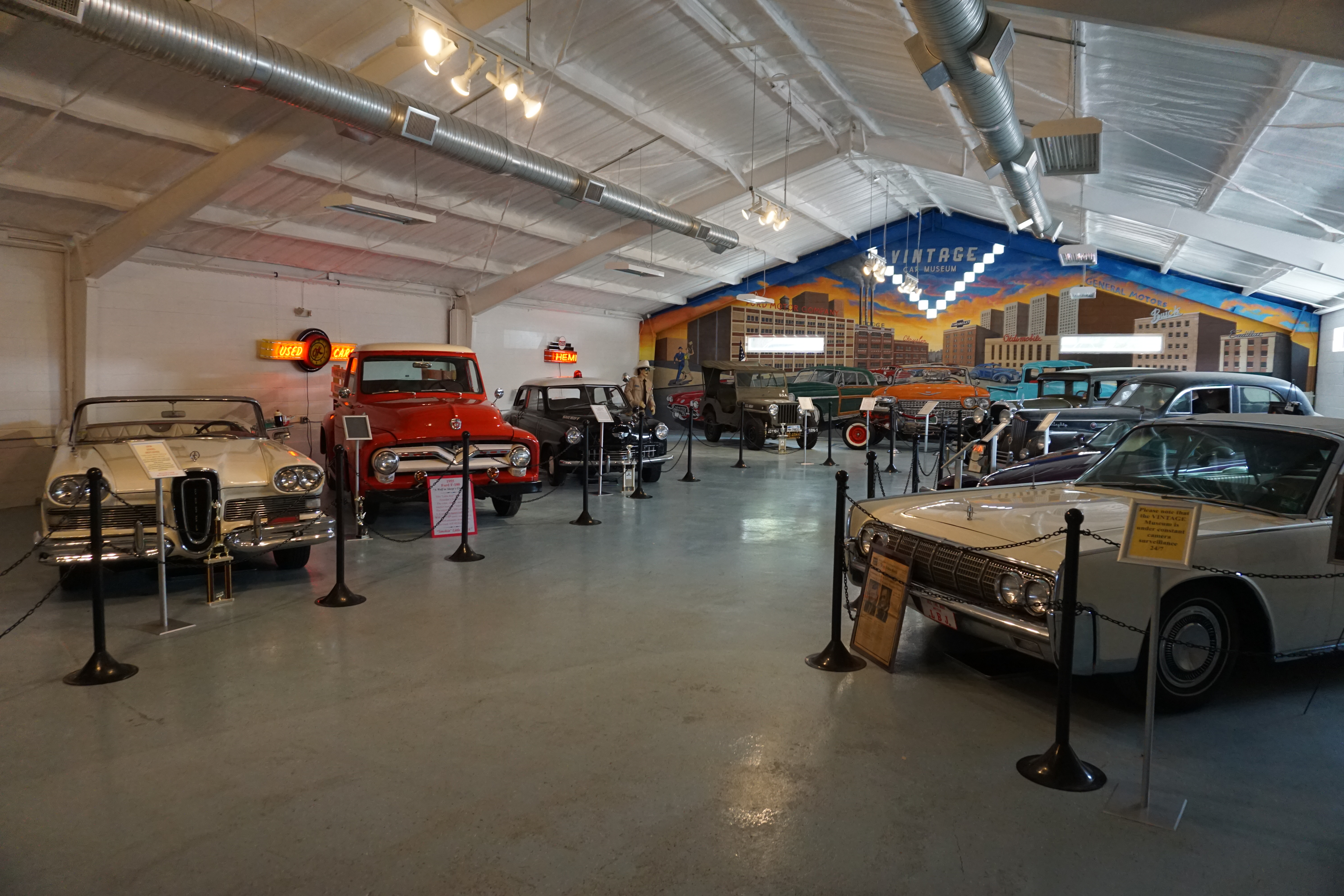
Interior of the Vintage Grill & Car Museum

The museum features 11 cars. Its collection includes a 1930 Buick, a 1940 LaSalle, a 1948 Studebaker sheriff patrol car, a 1948 Lincoln and a 1964 Lincoln Continental owned by President Lyndon B. Johnson, a 1975 Trabant, a 1979 Jeep CJ-7 (featuring six-wheel drive), a 1988 Jeep Grand Wagoneer-Dodge Durango hybrid, and a 1997 Pontiac G8 concept car. On display are cars featured in the films The Godfather and Pearl Harbor.

== Restaurant ==
The restaurant bills itself as serving "farm-to-table southern style cuisine", and it sources its produce from the local Weatherford Farmers Market.

== History ==
Vintage Grill & Car Museum founder Tom Moncrief, an oilman from Fort Worth, was made to create a combination car museum and restaurant after visiting one in Sydney, Australia, while on his honeymoon in 1988. After originally planning to open a 1950s-themed museum in Fort Worth, Moncrief took a suggestion to open it instead in an old service station, purchasing one in Weatherford for the purpose.

The current museum's buildings were built around 1919; by 1921, when the Bankhead Highway arrived in Weatherford, the lot included a 50-car garage, an auto sales and office building, gas pumps, and a repair shop. Before being repurposed as a car museum and restaurant, the property's former gas station also served as Weatherford's Greyhound bus station.

The establishment opened to the public in early 2015.

=== Vintage Car Museum and Event Center ===
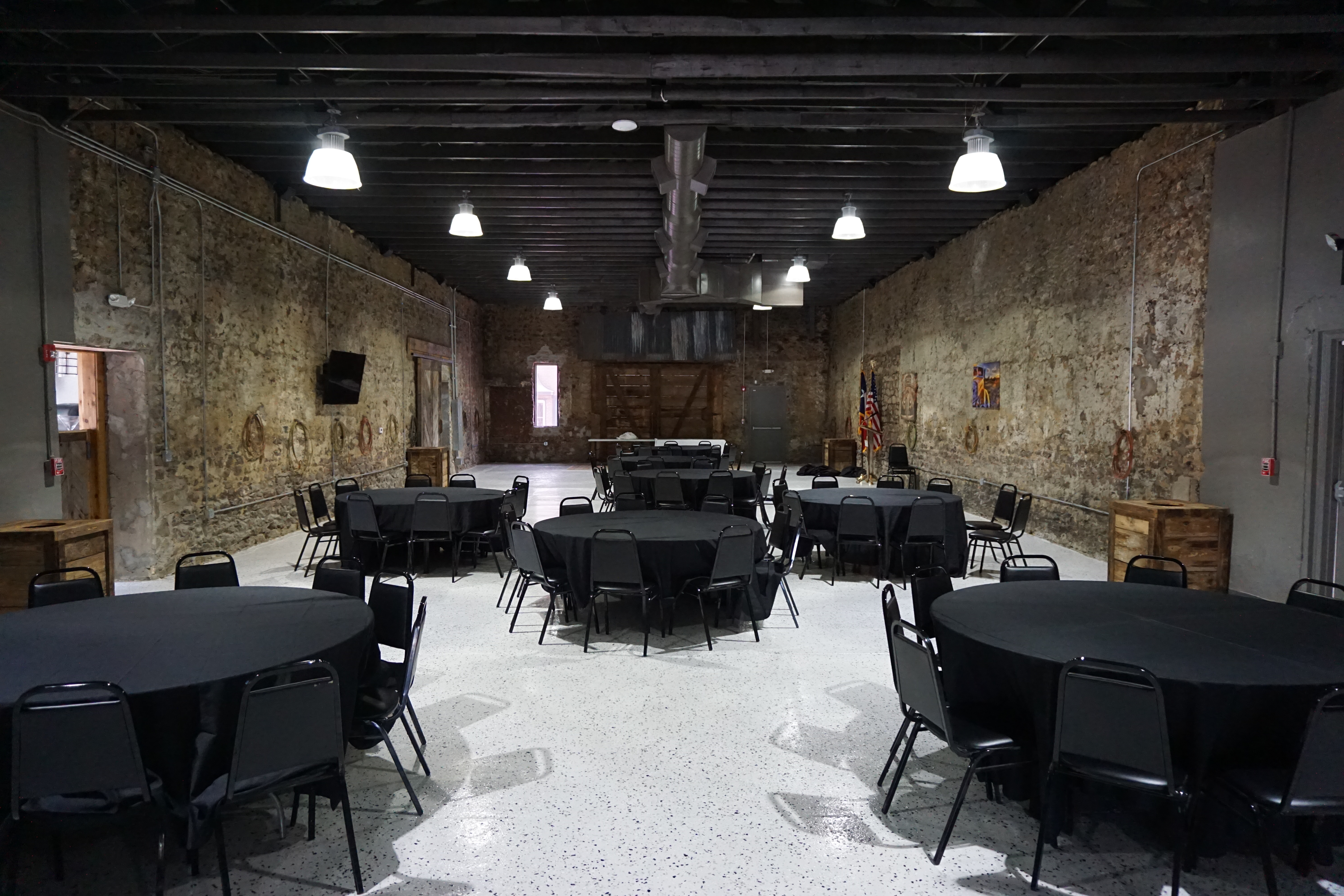
Interior of the Vintage Car Museum & Event Center

On August 4, 2016, the companion Vintage Car Museum and Event Center opened one block west of Vintage Grill & Car Museum, at 100 Fort Worth Highway. The Museum and Event Center is located in the 13,000-square-foot (1,200 m^{2}) Hobson Building, which allows Moncrief to display more of his car collections, which are curated by Shana Akins. The Event Center walls are the original 1886 rock walls from when the building was a livery stable. It can accommodate over 200 people.

== Gallery ==
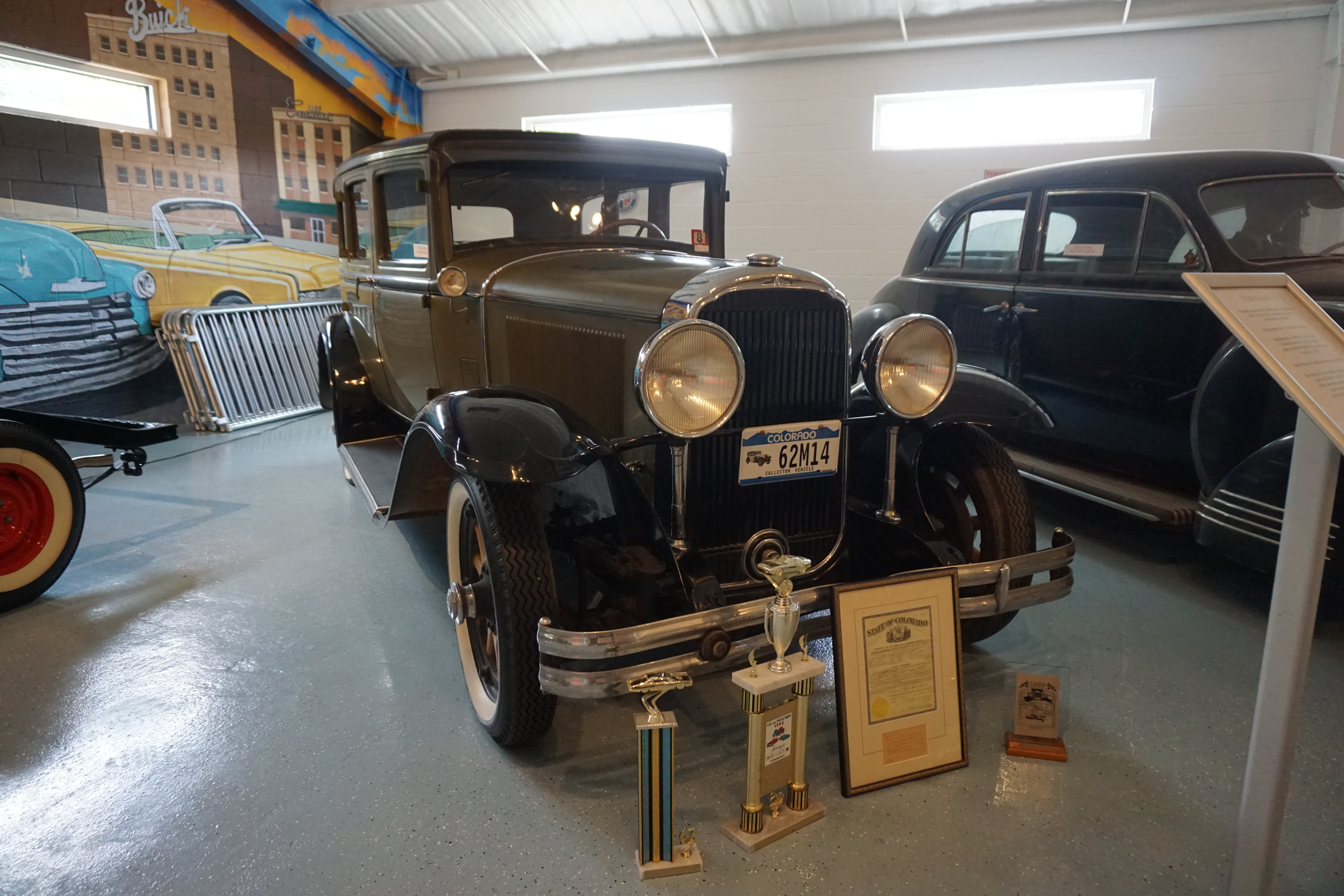
1930 Buick

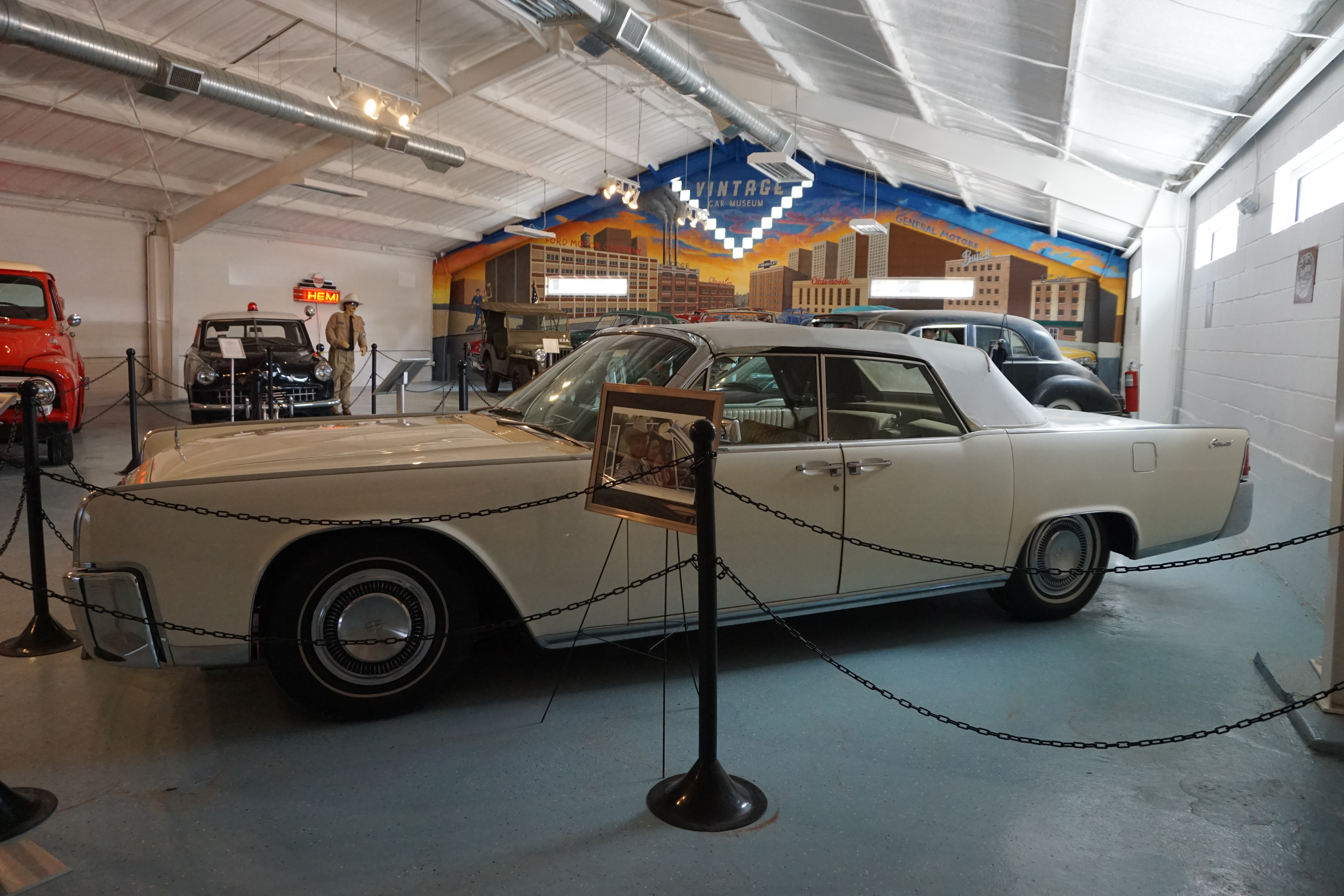
Lyndon B. Johnson's 1964 Lincoln Continental convertible

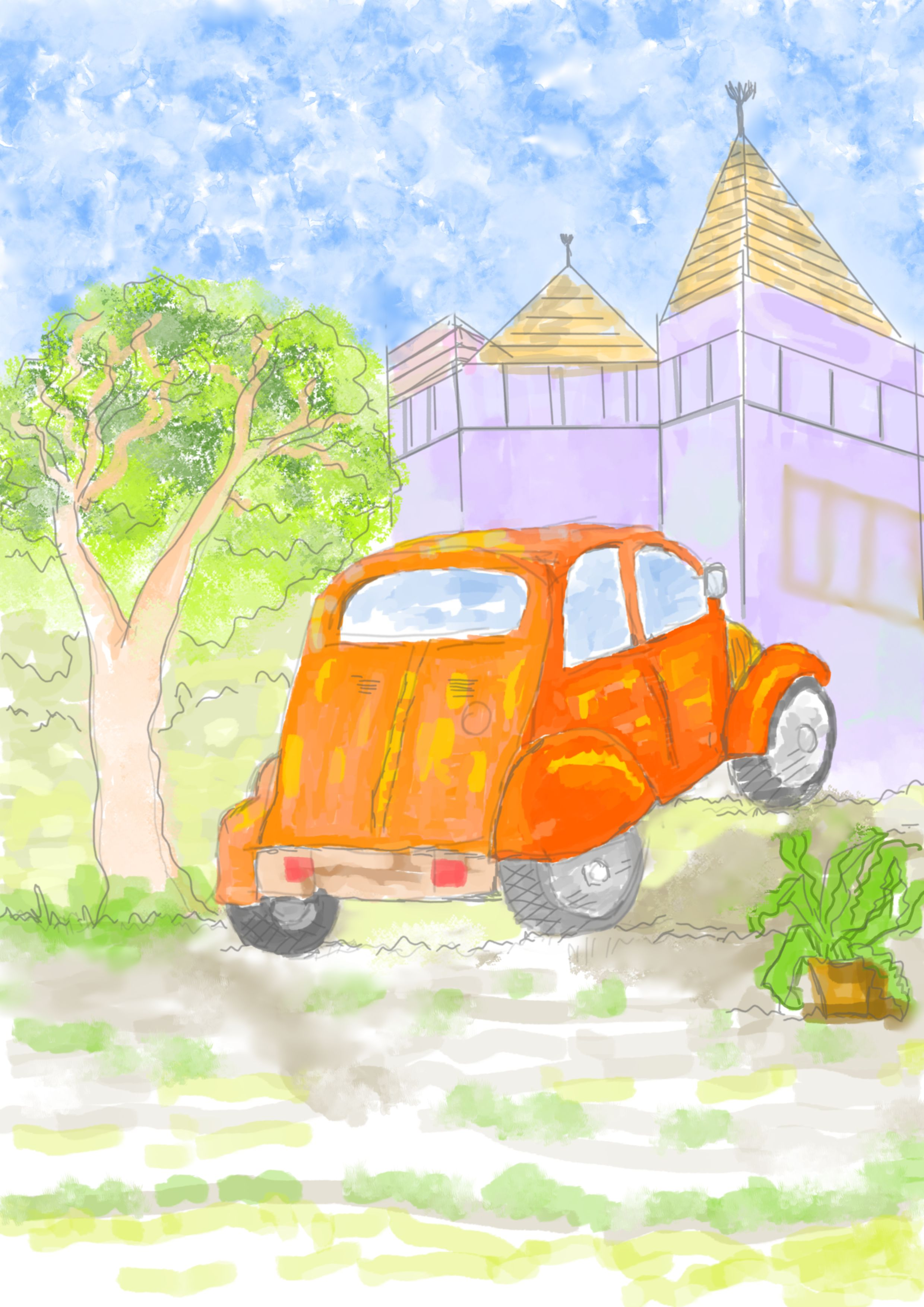
Citroen 2CV Vintage Collection Paintings

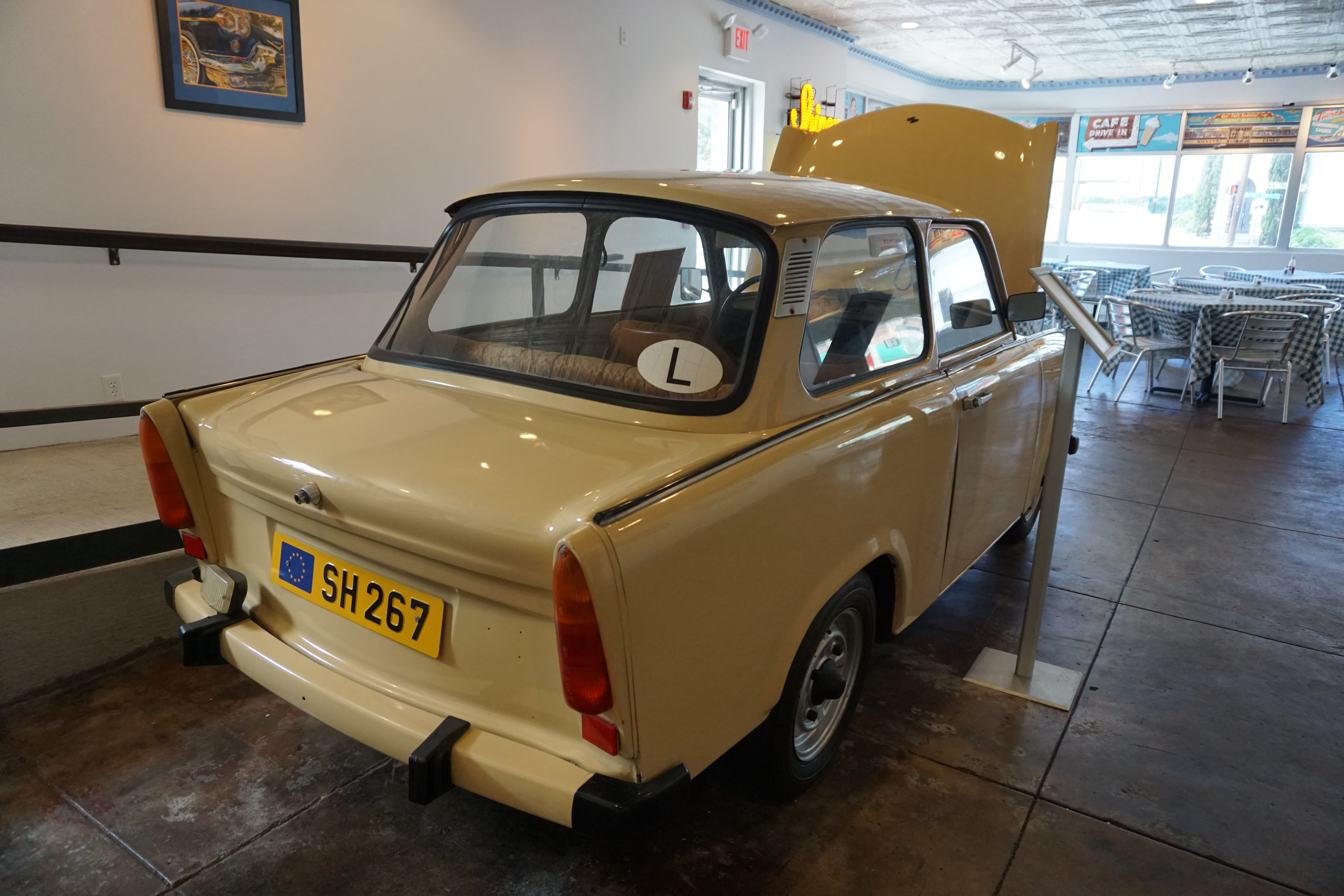
1975 Trabant 501
