= Jeep SJ =

American car model platform

SJ
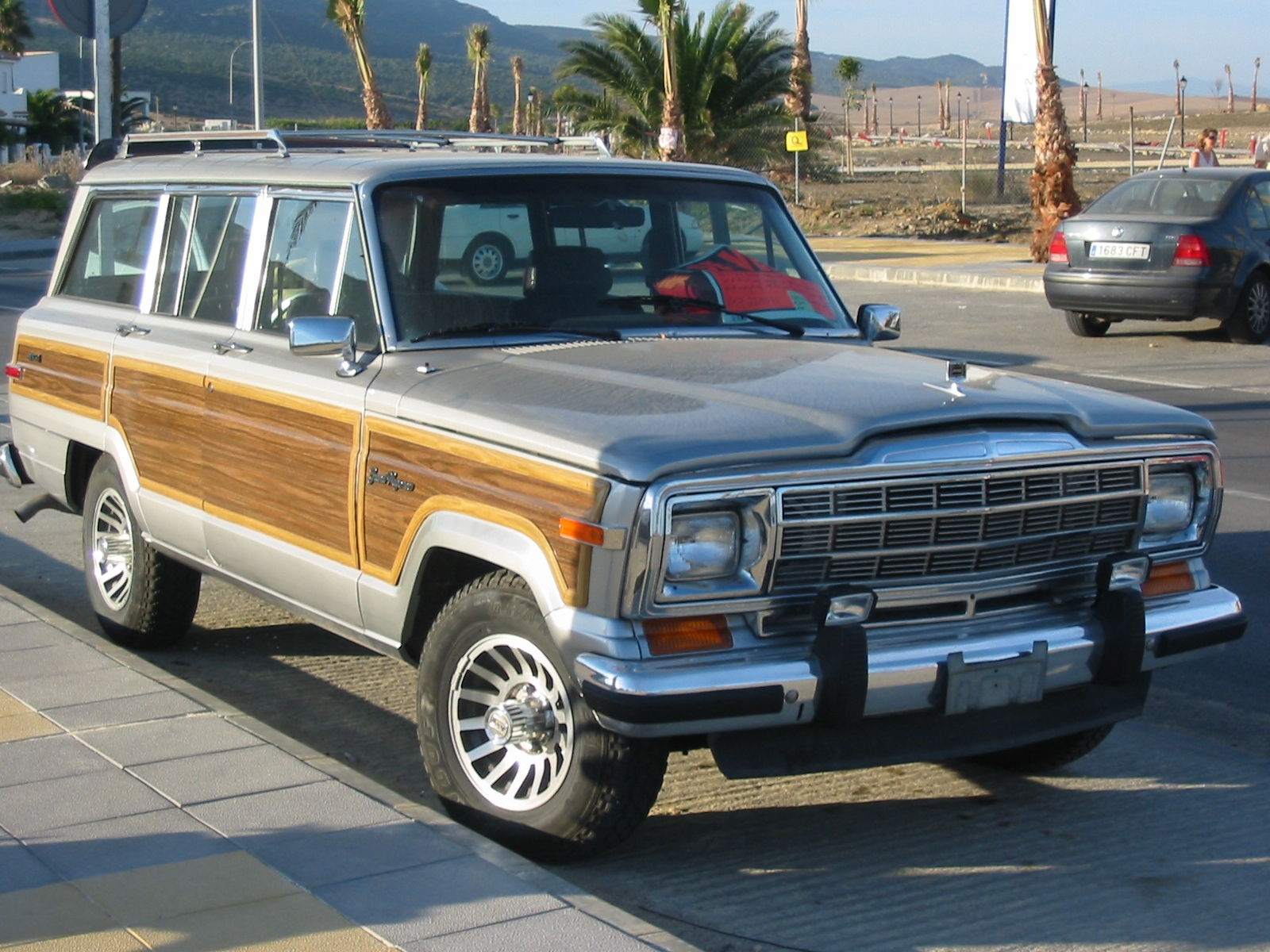
- A 1991 Jeep Grand Wagoneer

Overview
- Manufacturer: Willys-Overland Motors; Kaiser Jeep; American Motors; Chrysler
- Production: 1962–1991

Body and chassis
- Class: Full-size SUV; Full-size Pickup truck
- Layout: Front engine, rear-wheel drive / four-wheel drive
- Body styles: 2-door SUV; 2-door Pickup truck 4-door SUV
- Vehicles: Jeep Gladiator; Jeep J-Series; Jeep Cherokee; Jeep Wagoneer; Jeep M715; Jeep Grand Wagoneer

Powertrain
- Engines: 230 cu in (3.8 L) Tornado I6; 232 cu in (3.8 L) AMC I6; 258 cu in (4.2 L) AMC I6; 327 cu in (5.4 L) AMC Vigilante V8; 350 cu in (5.7 L) Buick Dauntless V8; 360 cu in (5.9 L) AMC V8; 401 cu in (6.6 L) AMC V8
- Transmissions: 3-speed manual 4-speed manual 3-speed GM THM400 automatic 3-speed Chrysler A727 automatic 3-speed Chrysler A999 automatic

Dimensions
- Wheelbase: 108.7 in (2,761 mm); 110 in (2,794 mm); 120 in (3,048 mm); 132 in (3,353 mm); 165 in (4,191 mm) (extended wheelbase chassis-campers)

Jeep's SJ platform was part of the "FSJ" or full-size Jeep lineup. A "FSJ" is any vehicle produced in North America, carrying the "Jeep" nameplate, with 2 or 4 doors, in rear- or four-wheel drive, whose wheelbase does not exceed 132 in (3,353 mm), nor is less than 109 in (2,769 mm), and whose tread width is no more than 67 in (1,702 mm) nor less than 57 in (1,448 mm).

This definition is known to include the following models:

- 1963–1991 Jeep Wagoneer (renamed the “Grand Wagoneer” for the 1984 model year)
- 1963–1988 Jeep Gladiator (renamed the “J” series for 1972 model year)
- 1967–1969 Jeep M-715/724/725/726/6217 military versions
- 1974–1983 Jeep Cherokee
