= Brampton Assembly Plant =

Brampton Assembly Plant is the name of two separate automobile factories by American Motors Corporation (AMC) and bought out by Chrysler in 1987:

- Brampton Assembly (AMC) - assembly operations for cars and Jeeps from 1962 to 1992
- Brampton Assembly - built by AMC and opened in 1986 as Bramalea Assembly, and in current operation
