= Jeep Wagoneer (SJ) =

Sport utility vehicle produced by Kaiser, AMC, and Chrysler

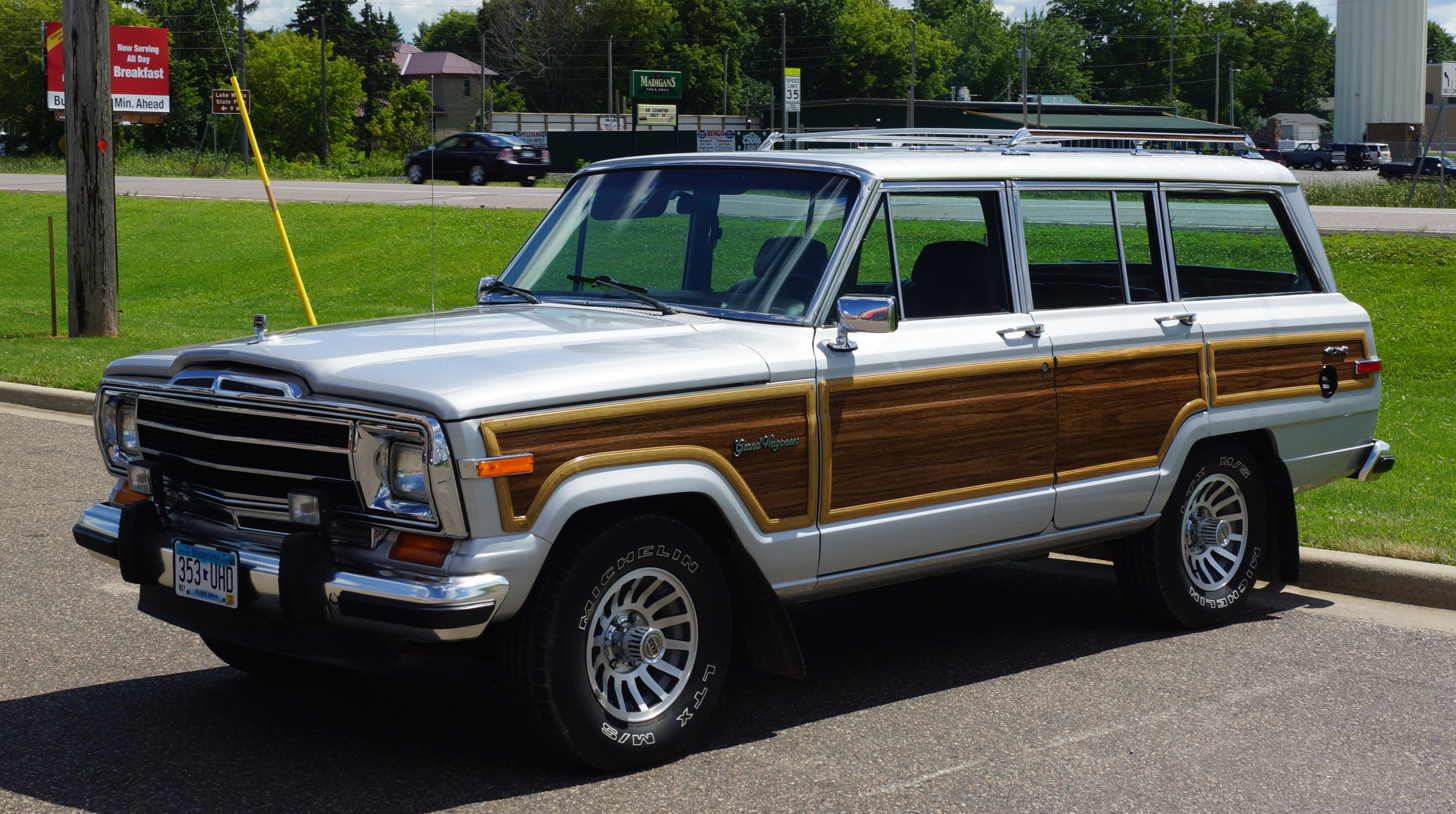
- 1990 Jeep Grand Wagoneer (SJ)

Overview
- Manufacturer: Kaiser Jeep (1963–1970); American Motors (1970–1987); Chrysler (1987–1991)
- Also called: Jeep Grand Wagoneer (1984–1991); Jeep Simorgh (Iran, 1963–1967); Jeep Ahoo (Iran, 1967–1974)
- Production: 1962–June 1991
- Model years: 1963–1991
- Assembly: United States: Toledo, Ohio (Stickney Plant); Iran: Tehran (Pars Khodro); Egypt: Cairo (AEV); Argentina: Córdoba (IKA); Mexico: Mexico City (VAM)
- Designer: Brooks Stevens

Body and chassis
- Class: Luxury full-size SUV
- Body style: 2-door panel truck; 2-door SUV; 4-door SUV
- Layout: Front engine, rear-wheel drive / four-wheel drive
- Platform: Full size (SJ) Jeep platform
- Related: Jeep Gladiator; Jeep J-Series; Jeep Cherokee

Powertrain
- Engine: 230 cu in (3.8 L) Tornado I6; 258 cu in (4.2 L) AMC I6; 282 cu in (4.6 L) VAM I6 — Mexico only; 327 cu in (5.4 L) Vigilante V8; 350 cu in (5.7 L) Buick Dauntless V8; 360 cu in (5.9 L) AMC V8; 401 cu in (6.6 L) AMC V8
- Transmission: 3-speed Borg-Warner T-90J manual; 4-speed manual; 3-speed GM THM400 automatic; 3-speed Chrysler A727 automatic; 3-speed Chrysler A999 automatic

Dimensions
- Wheelbase: 110 in (2,794 mm)
- Length: 186.4 in (4,735 mm)
- Width: 74.8 in (1,900 mm)
- Height: 66.4 in (1,687 mm)
- Curb weight: 4,514 lb (2,048 kg)

Chronology
- Predecessor: Willys Jeep Station Wagon
- Successor: Jeep Grand Wagoneer Limited (ZJ); Jeep Wagoneer Limited (XJ); Jeep Wagoneer/Grand Wagoneer (WS)

The Jeep Wagoneer is a luxury 4x4 produced and marketed under the Jeep brand from the 1963 to 1991 model years. Introduced as the replacement for the Jeep Station Wagon, the Wagoneer was the first Jeep model line completely distinct from the Jeep CJ. Designed as a truck-based station wagon, the model line became a progenitor of the modern sport-utility vehicle (SUV).

Designed by a team led by industrial designer Brooks Stevens, the Wagoneer shared its Jeep SJ chassis with the Jeep Gladiator full-size pickup truck (later renamed the J-Series). Alongside the five-door wagon, the Wagoneer was also marketed as a three-door wagon and a two-door panel truck (effectively giving Jeep its own van). After 1968, the Wagoneer was sold exclusively as the five-door wagon; the three-door wagon was reintroduced as the Jeep Cherokee for 1974.

Along with developing a sport-utility vehicle smaller than the Chevrolet Suburban and International Travelall, Jeep conceived the Wagoneer to balance the capabilities and features of both an off-road vehicle and a premium-brand sedan or station wagon. The higher-content Super Wagoneer was introduced for 1966, upgrading the model line with features from higher-priced sedans. From 1971 to 1991, in line with flagship station wagons, the model line featured (simulated) woodgrain paneling on the exterior body sides. Following the 1984 introduction of the Jeep XJ Cherokee (which received a wood-paneled Wagoneer trim), the SJ Wagoneer became the Grand Wagoneer for the rest of its production.

Over a single generation, the SJ-series Wagoneer was produced for 29 model years (as of 2026, the third longest run in U.S. automotive history), as Jeep changed hands from Kaiser Motors to AMC to Chrysler. For its entire production run, Jeep manufactured the Wagoneer at its Stickney Plant in Toledo, Ohio. Following a short-lived 1993 revival of the nameplate as a flagship version of the Jeep Grand Cherokee (again using exterior wood trim), the nameplate remained dormant for three decades until the introduction of the largest Jeep SUVs ever designed, the WS-chassis Wagoneer/Grand Wagoneer.

== Kaiser years ==
With competition from the "big three" automakers advancing on Jeep's four-wheel-drive market, Willys management decided that a new and more advanced vehicle was needed. Conceived in the early 1960s while Willys-Overland Motors was owned by Kaiser Jeep Corporation, the Wagoneer replaced the original Willys Jeep Station Wagon, originally introduced in July 1946 and produced until the 1964 model year.

It was introduced in November 1962 for the 1963 model year as a successor to the Willys Jeep Station Wagon that had been built since 1946. Although sharing a pickup truck chassis (like its predecessor), the Wagoneer had a sophisticated station wagon body design that was more carlike than any other 4×4 on the market. Compared with offerings from GM, Ford, International Harvester, Toyota, Nissan and Land Rover — which were producing utilitarian work-oriented vehicles with spartan truck-like interiors — the Wagoneer's luxury set it apart. Together with the Gladiator, the revolutionary Wagoneer SJ platform included an advanced overhead cam straight-six engine, and offered features unheard of at the time in any other mainstream 4WD vehicle, such as independent front suspension, power steering, automatic transmission, a factory radio, and optional air conditioning.

Like its long-lived predecessor, the new 1963 Wagoneer took shape under industrial designer Brooks Stevens, while Willys' engineering staff handled the technical development. To appeal to mainstream consumers, the Wagoneer received a relatively low stance and car-like manners. The lower entry height was accomplished with a transfer case and a compact running gear design. Suspension tuning gave it a good ride, but because it was developed as a truck, it could haul and tow as needed. Development took three years and cost around US$20 million ($210,326,087 in 2025 dollars).

At its introduction, the Jeep Wagoneer had no direct competition. For comparison, it took another eight years for Land Rover's Range Rover to start in only a two-door body style. It took until 1981 for the four-door 4×4 to be developed and Range Rover sales in the United States began in 1987.

=== 1963–1964 ===
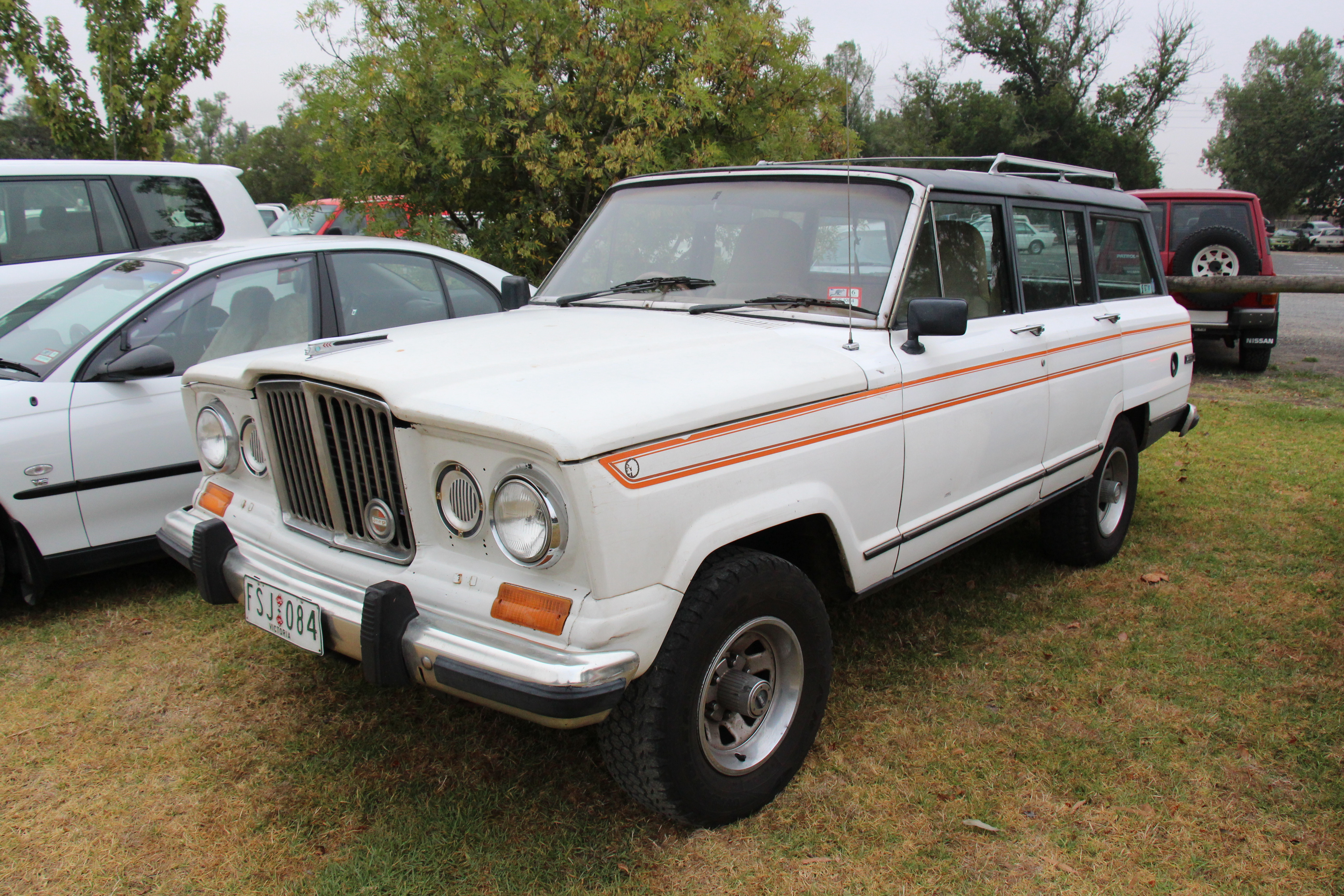
Early Wagoneers featured a tall, narrow front grille

The original Wagoneer is a full-size body-on-frame vehicle that shared its architecture with the Gladiator pickup truck. At first, it offered many body types, suspension, and drivetrain options. Available as both two- and four-door wagons, the two-door could be had as a "Panel Delivery" model with windowless sides behind the doors and double "barn doors" in the rear instead of the usual tailgate and roll-down rear window.

Early Wagoneers were powered by Willys' new "Tornado" SOHC 230 cu in (3.8 L) I6 engine, which had debuted in 1962 as an option for Jeep's previous Station Wagons. The engine developed 140 hp (104 kW; 142 PS) and was noted for being fuel-efficient for its day. Both a 3-speed manual and automatic transmission were offered, each available with either rear-wheel-drive or part-time four-wheel-drive without a center differential, but with manually locking front hubs. The Warn hubs were utilized to engage or disengage the front wheels, to switch the drivetrain between two-wheel-drive and four-wheel-drive mode.

Like on the original Willys Wagon, independent front suspension instead of a rigid front axle was again offered to give the Wagoneer a more car-like ride and handling. The original Wagoneer featured independent front suspension (IFS) as standard on the rear-wheel drive models and was optional on the four-wheel drive, for either $135 or $160.

Instead of the Wagon's "Planadyne" design, the Wagoneer's IFS used swing axles and torsion bar springs, but they combined with short upper A-arms, tied into the torsion bars at their inner pivot points, such that the swing axles served as the lower control arms in a kind of double wishbone suspension design and the axles are located fore and aft by control links. On the four-wheel-drives, the IFS replaced the standard Dana 27AF axle with a single, center-pivot front axle that allowed the Dana 27 differential to swing with the curb-side half. Further, all Wagoneers had 11-inch drum-brakes all-around; seat belts were optional, and the 4WD came with a standard compass. Front and rear power take-offs were available for heavy-duty utility applications.

Shortly after the introduction of the Wagoneer, in early 1963, Willys Motors changed its name to "Kaiser Jeep Corporation."

The 1964 models introduced factory-optional air conditioning, as well as a lower-compression 133 hp (99 kW; 135 PS) Tornado engine, to remedy cooling problems and "pinging" at altitude the original had sometimes suffered. While it made less power, it returned greater economy, but this lower-compression version was phased out within a year.

=== 1965–1966 ===
Starting with 1965, all models came with a new standard safety package that included front and rear seat belts, a padded dashboard, a high-impact windshield, and a dual braking system.

Late-year 1965 Wagoneers and Gladiators were available with the 250 hp (186 kW; 253 PS) 327 cu in (5.4 L) AMC V8 engine, which proved to be a popular option. Additionally, the Tornado engine was replaced by American Motors' 232 cu in (3.8 L) OHV I6. According to the automotive press, this engine was smooth, powerful, reliable, and easily maintained, but the most likely reason it was offered was that it was less expensive.

Although the independent front suspension was positively reviewed, the option was not popular and was dropped from production, at least for the 4WD models, in 1965.

==== Super Wagoneer ====
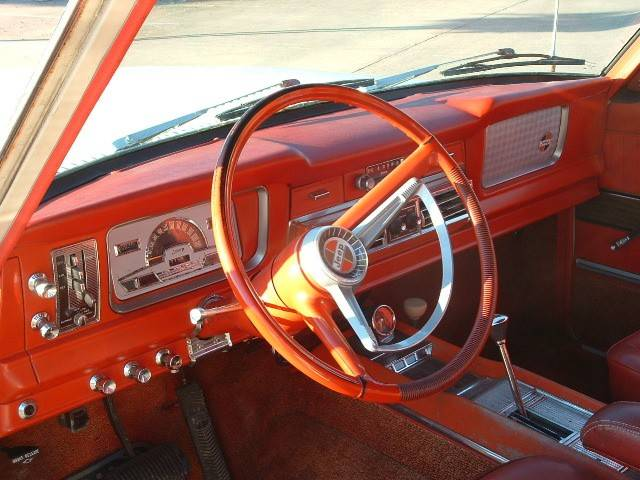
Super Wagoneer interior

The 1966 model year also saw the introduction of the more luxurious Super Wagoneer, identified by a new, more modern-looking full-width grille. It initially featured a higher-performance 270 hp (201 kW; 274 PS) version of the AMC V8, fitted with a four-barrel carburetor. With comfort and convenience features not standard or even available on other vehicles of its type at the time—such as push-button radio, seven-position tilt steering wheel, ceiling courtesy lights, air conditioning, power-retracting rear window into the tailgate, power brakes, power steering, and console-shifted TH400 automatic transmission—the Super Wagoneer is now widely regarded as the precursor of today's luxury SUVs.

Production of the Super Wagoneer ended in 1969, and in total, it is believed that 3,989 Super Wagoneers had been produced.

=== 1967–1971 ===
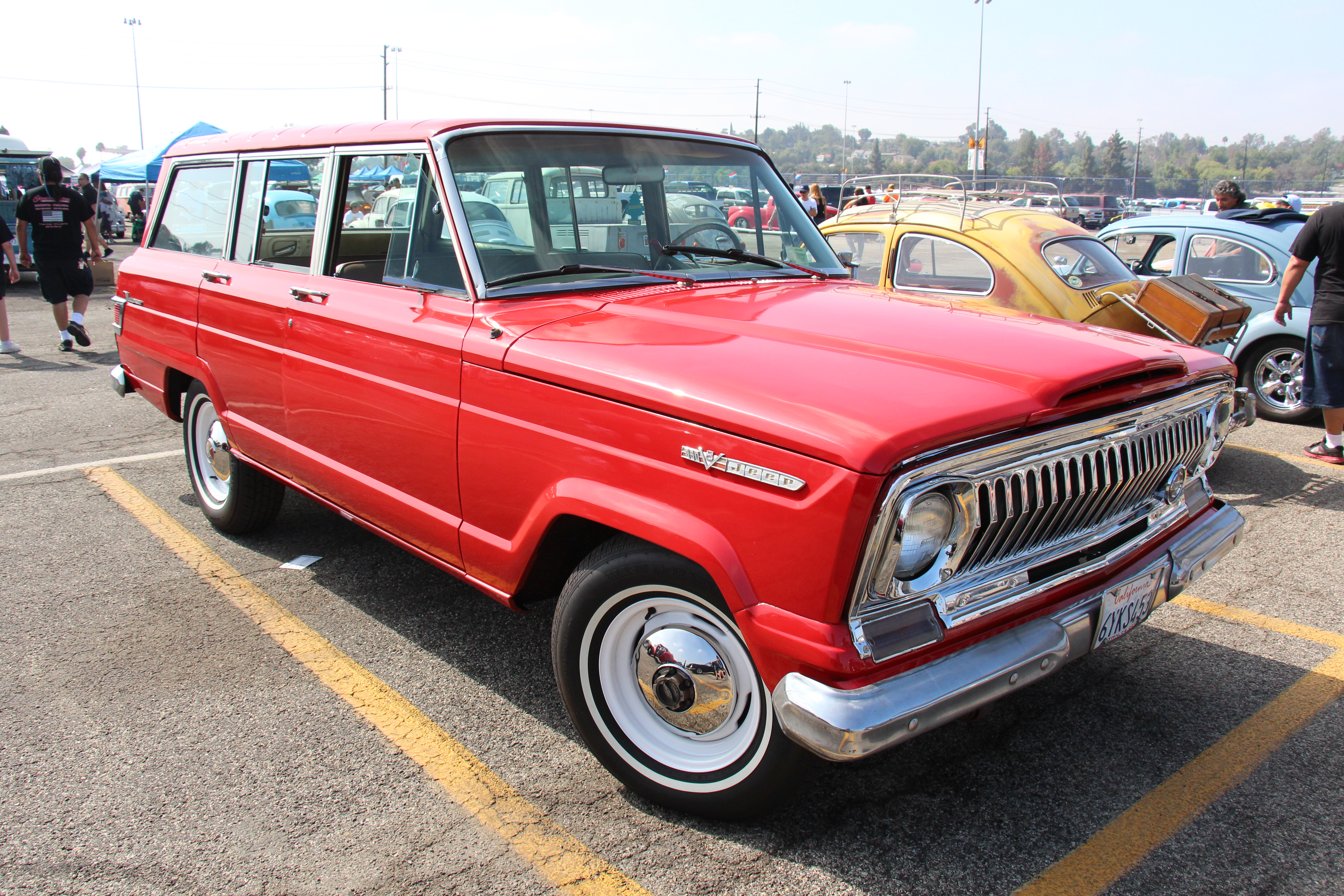
1968 Wagoneer

Between 1967 and 1969, all rear-wheel-drive-only models, which the four-wheel-drives had outsold from the beginning, were discontinued, and from then on, all Wagoneers (and Cherokees) had solid axles and leaf springs, both front and rear. At the end of 1968, the slow-selling two-door versions were also discontinued.

For 1968 through 1971, Wagoneers were powered by Buick’s 350 cu in (5.7 L) 230 hp (172 kW; 233 PS) Dauntless V8. The Dauntless made less horsepower than the previous AMC V8 (230 hp vs. 250), but more torque at lower rpm (350 ft⋅lbf (475 N⋅m) at 2400 rpm, versus 340 ft⋅lbf (461 N⋅m) at 2600).

After the 1971 model year, Wagoneers were exclusively powered by AMC's engines.

== AMC years ==
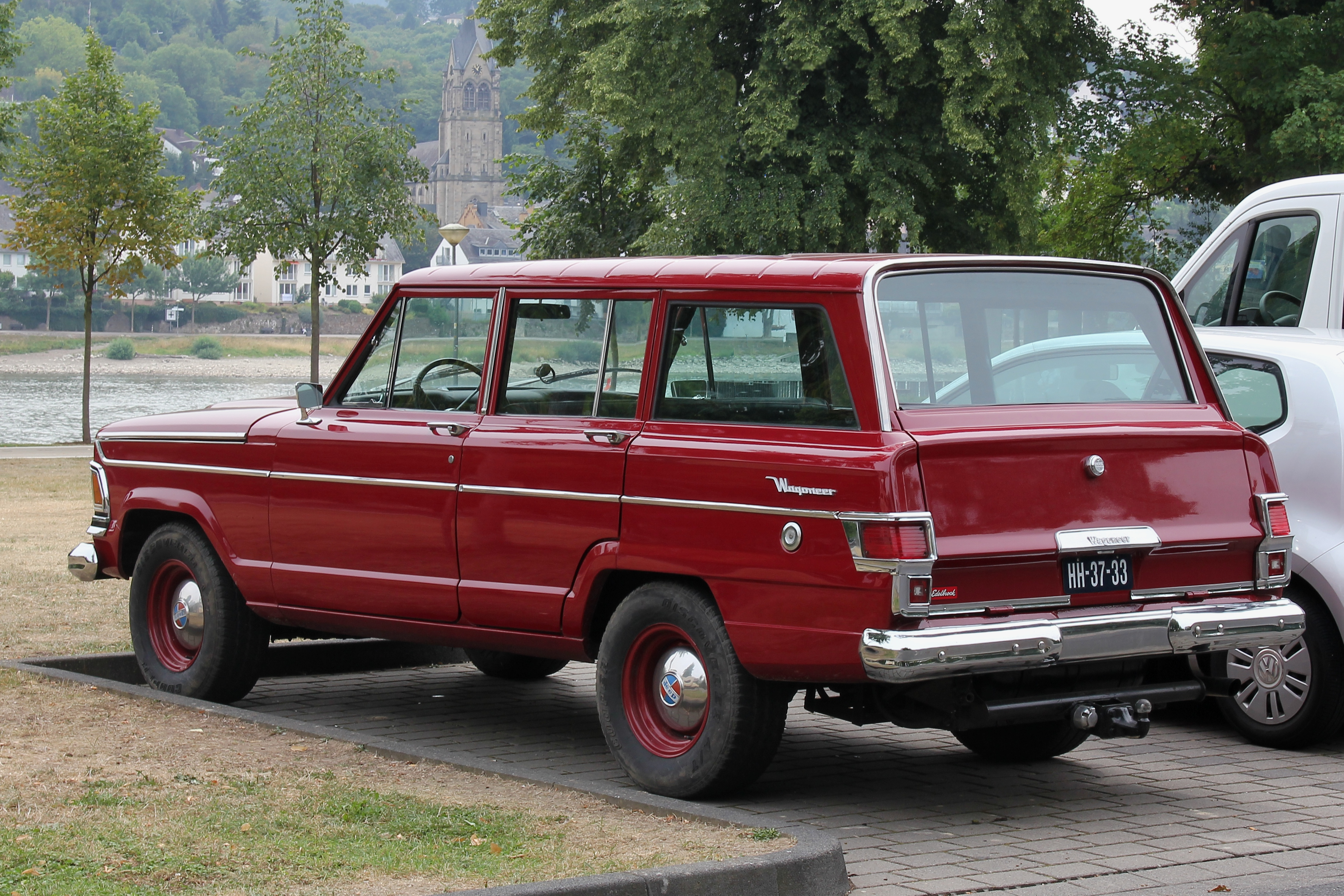
ca. 1971 Jeep Wagoneer rear

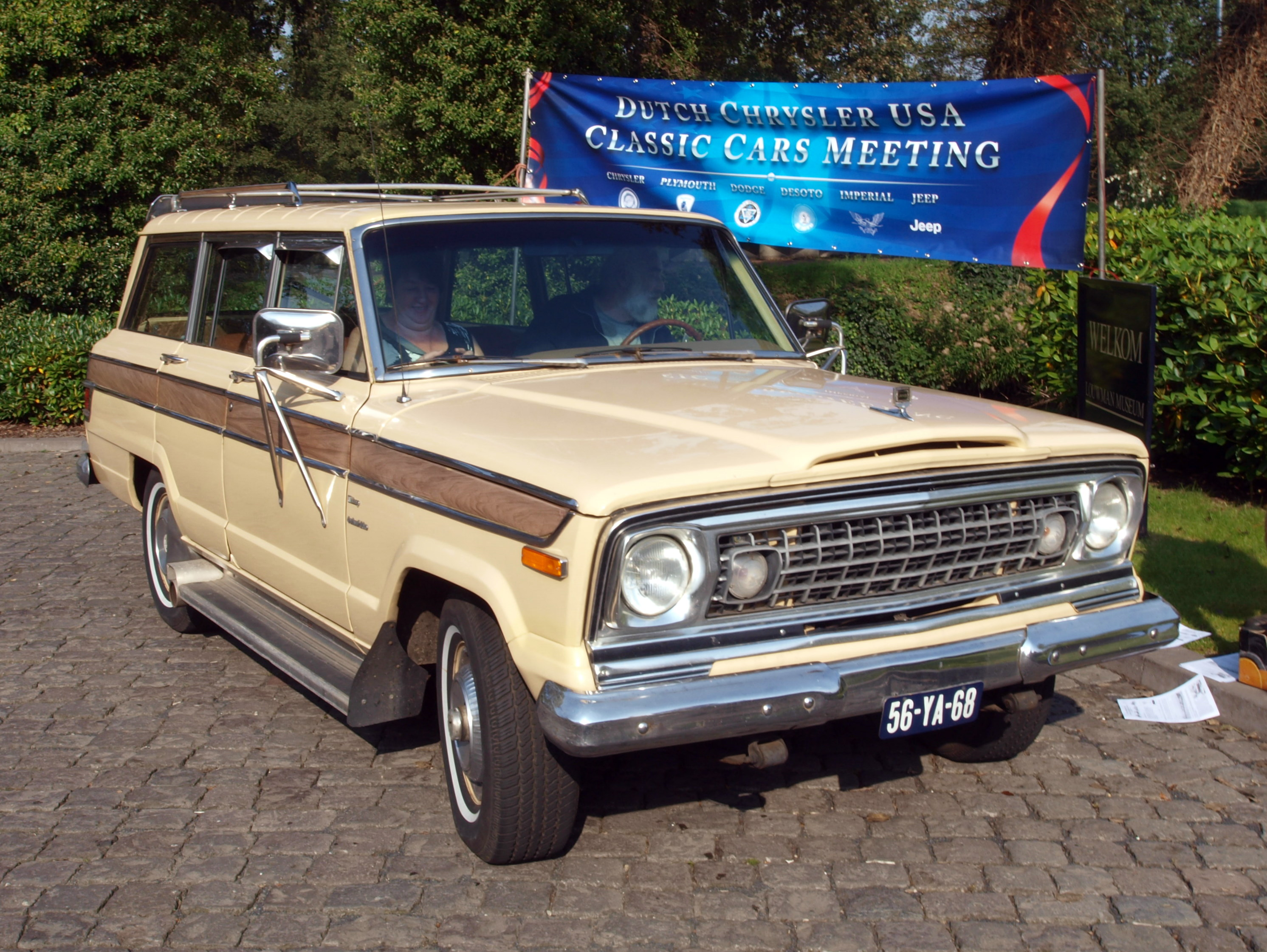
1976 Wagoneer with "egg-crate" front grille

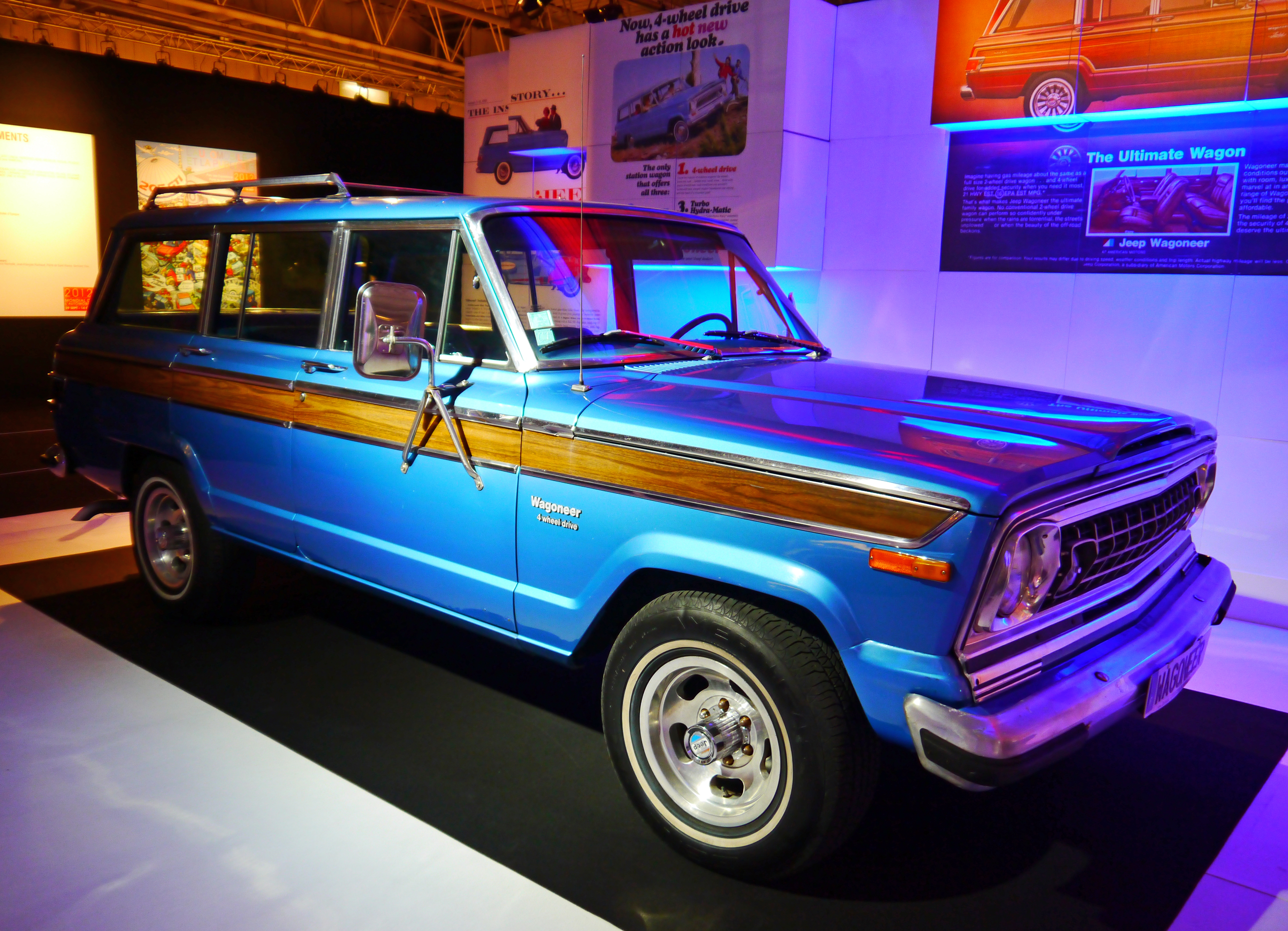
1973–1979 Wagoneer Quadra-Trac

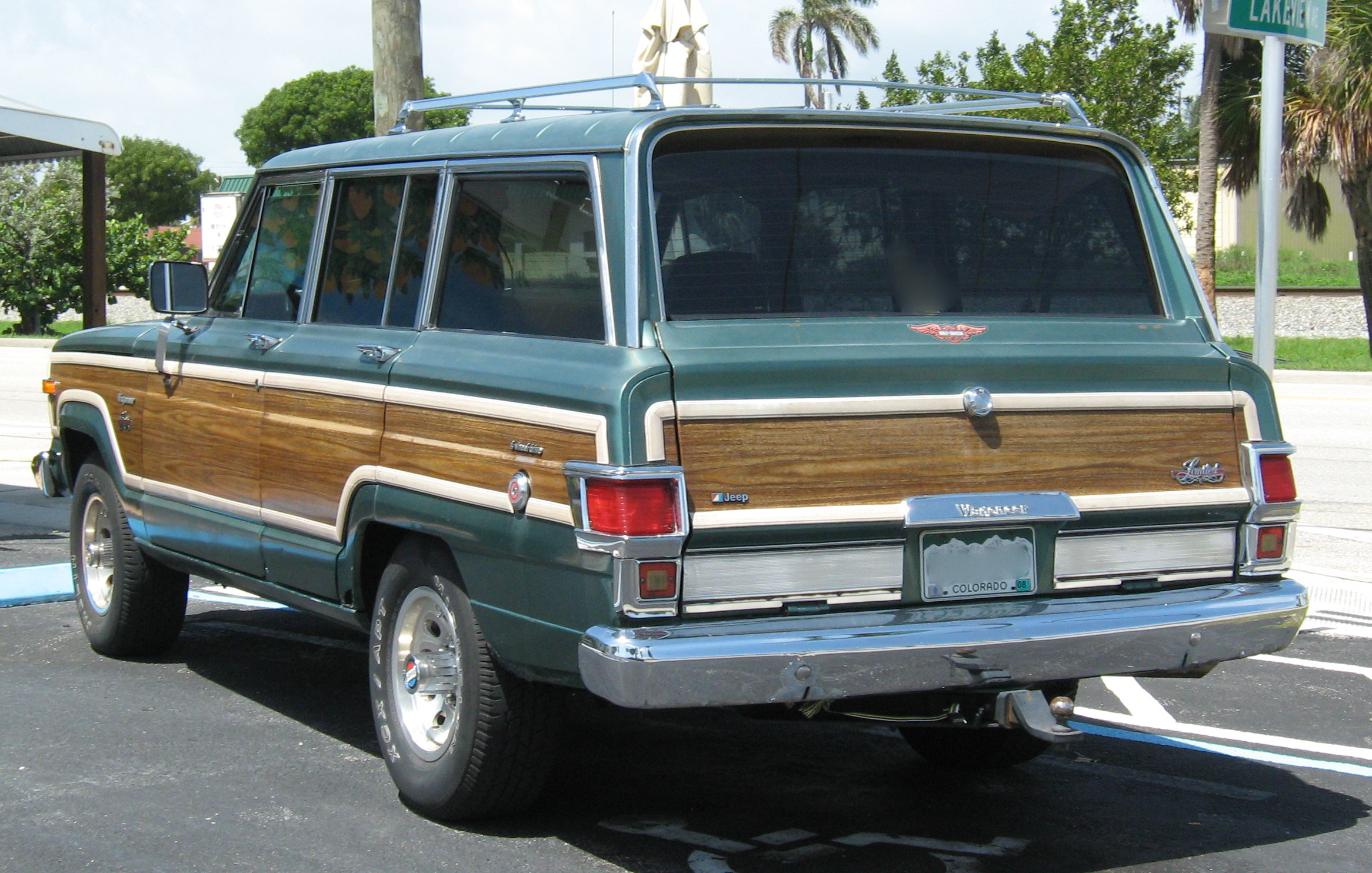
1978–1983 Wagoneer Limited

=== 1970 ===
In early 1970, AMC acquired Kaiser Jeep Corporation and began refining and upgrading the range. American Motors improved manufacturing efficiency and lowered costs by incorporating shared components such as engines. Reducing noise, vibration, and harshness improved the Wagoneer driving experience. Visually, a big change was made during the 1970 model year by replacing the metal grille with a new plastic grille having an egg crate pattern instead of vertical bars.

=== 1971 ===
The 1971 model year included a special "X-coded" model finished in "golden lime" with unique wood-grain side panels, numerous convenience features, and power assists, that was priced $1,000 more than the deluxe "custom" model. After 1971, the outsourced Buick 350 was replaced by the 360 cu in (5.9 L) AMC V8, with the 401 cu in (6.6 L) later becoming available.

=== 1972–1977 ===
The innovative Quadra-Trac full-time four-wheel-drive system, which broadened the appeal of Jeep products to people who wanted four-wheel-drive traction without the inconvenience of a manual-shift transfer case and manual locking hubs, was introduced in 1973.

In 1974, AMC redesigned the greenhouse of the defunct two-door Wagoneer, with much wider D-pillars and single, long rear side windows, and reintroduced it as the Cherokee. This replaced the Jeepster Commando, whose sales had not met expectations despite an extensive 1972 revamp. The Cherokee appealed to a younger market than the Wagoneer, which was regarded as a family SUV.

Also in 1974, front disc brakes were introduced as standard equipment. While the new Cherokees still had 4-wheel drum brakes standard, front discs could be had as an option.

From 1976, all Wagoneer and Cherokee models received strengthened frames with stronger cross-members and boxed side rail construction.

=== 1978 ===
After the introduction of the Cherokee, AMC began to move the Wagoneer upmarket, and that brought high demand from a new market segment. Midway through 1978, the "Limited" was introduced, more luxuriously equipped than the earlier Super Wagoneer, offering Quadra-Trac, power disk brakes, air conditioning, power-adjustable bucket seats, power door locks, power windows, tilt steering wheel, cruise control, leather upholstery, plush carpeting, AM/FM/CB radio, leather-wrapped steering wheel, roof rack, forged aluminum wheels, and "wood grain" trim on the body sides. The two-barrel, 360 cu in (5.9 L) AMC V8 engine was standard with a four-barrel, 401 cu in (6.6 L) available at extra cost. Even though the US$10,500 ($51,830 in 2025 dollars) suggested retail price was in luxury Cadillac and Lincoln territory, the Limited's high-level specification attracted buyers, and sales were strong with a total of 28,871 Wagoneers produced in 1978, and 27,437 in 1979.

=== 1979 ===
On other SJ models, there were few styling changes until 1979, when all Wagoneer, Cherokee, and J-Series pickup models received a substantial styling update with one-piece aluminum bumpers and a new one-piece chrome plastic grille with a protruding middle section shaped somewhat like a pig's nose, horizontal slats, and square headlights. This front-end appearance was described as the "pig nose grille" and continued on Wagoneer models through 1985.

=== 1980 ===
For the 1980 model year, AMC decided to offer the four-wheel-drive platform using a station wagon body style but on a compact platform, and introduced the AMC Eagle.

With the V8s the primary choice among Wagoneer buyers, the 258 cu in (4.2 L) I6 engine was dropped in the 1970s, only to return as an option when Jeep sales – particularly of the high-volume Cherokee – were hit by the 1979 energy crisis. The Wagoneer continued to sell relatively well in comparison to luxurious station wagons offered by Ford, Chrysler, and GM, while production dropped to 10,481 in 1980, but increased to 13,741 in 1981, 18,709 in 1982, and 18,478 in 1983. When reintroduced, the engine came with a manual transmission as standard equipment, but in 1983, automatic transmissions with “Selec-Trac” four-wheel drive became standard. With this combination, the Wagoneer achieved EPA fuel-consumption estimates of 18 mpg_{‑US} (13 L/100 km; 22 mpg_{‑imp}) city and 25 mpg_{‑US} (9.4 L/100 km; 30 mpg_{‑imp}) highway – outstanding for a full-size SUV. This allowed the company to advertise good fuel mileage, although the more powerful 360 V8 remained popular with certain buyers despite its greater thirst for fuel.

=== 1981–1982 ===
In 1981, the Wagoneer line was expanded to three models. The Custom Wagoneer was the basic model, yet it included a four-speed transmission, free-wheeling hubs, power steering, and power front disc brakes, as well as passenger area carpeting. A new Brougham model added an upgraded interior trim that included woodgrain for the instrument cluster and horn cover, floor mats, power tailgate window, as well as the "convenience" and "light" packages. The Brougham's exterior included a thin side body scuff molding with a narrow woodgrain insert, a roof rack, as well as bright door and quarter window frames, and a lower tailgate molding. The Wagoneer Limited was the top-of-the-line with standard Quadra-Trac, automatic transmission, air conditioning, tinted glass, power windows and door locks, cruise control, AM/FM stereo radio, extra-quiet insulation, power six-way driver and passenger bucket seats with center armrest, upgraded door panels, leather-wrapped steering wheel, extra-thick carpeting, and a retractable cargo cover.

=== 1983 ===
The basic "Custom" model was dropped starting with the 1983 model year, and a new Selec-Trac system became standard equipment. A dash-mounted control allowed the driver to change between two-wheel drive and four-wheel drive. The switch activated a vacuum-activated spline clutch that was built into the transfer case, which engaged the front axle assembly. A shift lever mounted on the side of the transmission hump allowed the driver to shift between four-high and four-low while the vehicle was moving, although the transmission had to be shifted to neutral and the vehicle had to be moving at less than five miles per hour to accomplish this.

=== 1984: SJ and XJ ===
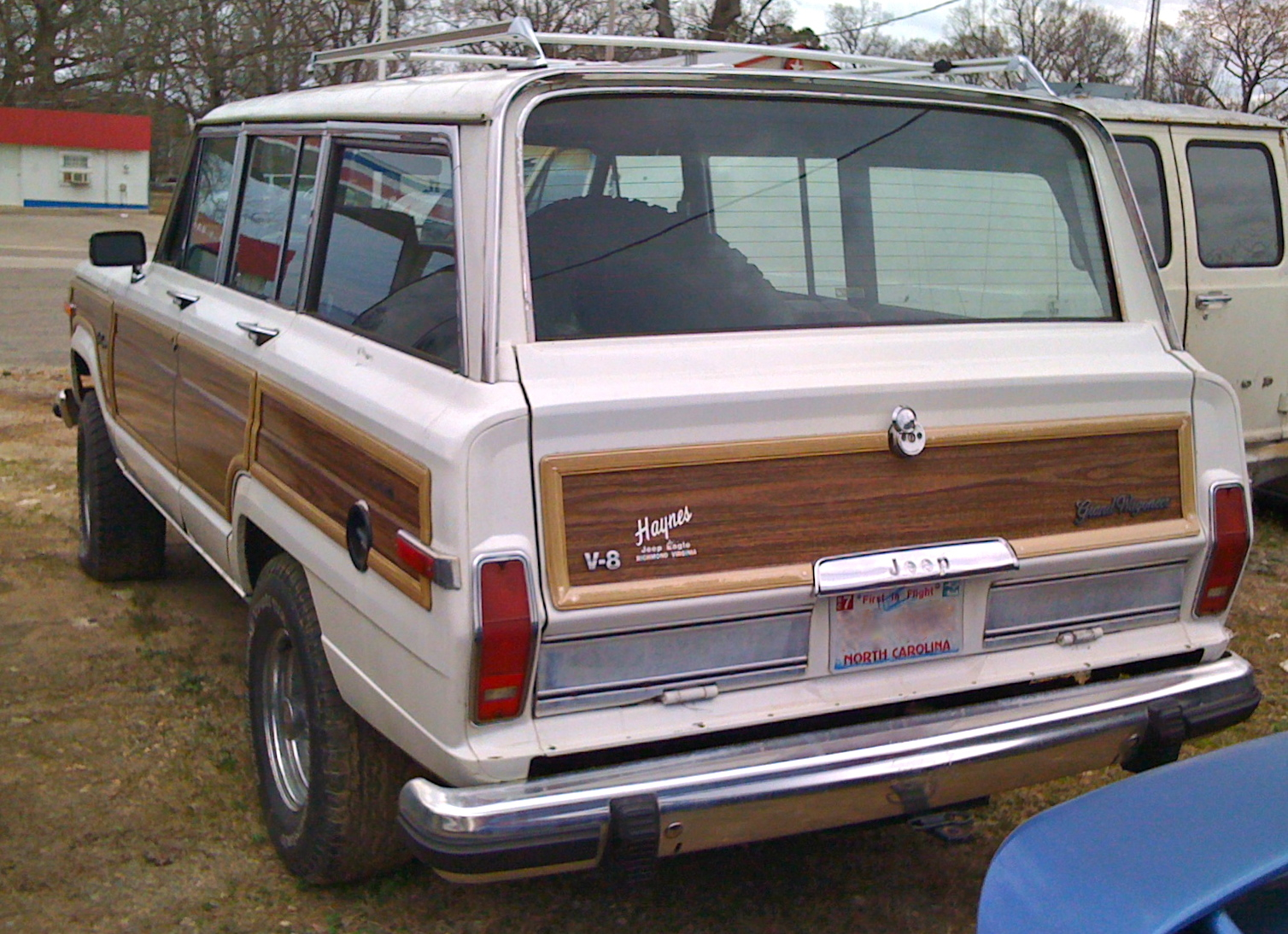
1984–1991 Grand Wagoneer tail-lights no longer wrapped around the rear corners, but used the type from the SJ-body Cherokee – narrow and vertical on the tailgate panel only

For 1984, AMC replaced the SJ-body Cherokee with the all-new, compact, and more fuel-efficient unibody Jeep Cherokee (XJ), and introduced an upscale version of the (XJ) known as the Wagoneer. The compact XJ Wagoneer was available in two trim levels: the "Wagoneer" and the "Wagoneer Limited." AMC originally intended for these vehicles to replace the SJ-body Wagoneer models, but high demand prompted the company to keep the old SJ-body Wagoneer in production alongside them even though the design, largely unchanged since 1962, was becoming increasingly antiquated.

The SJ-body Wagoneer line saw consolidation in 1984 with the end of the "Brougham" model, while the "Limited" was renamed the "Grand Wagoneer" to free up the "Wagoneer Limited" nameplate for the compact XJ Wagoneer. In mid-1984, AMC introduced a less expensive version called the Wagoneer "Custom", without the simulated woodgrain exterior. The Custom had steel wheels with hubcaps, standard equipment was pared down, and it had part-time four-wheel drive. Despite its lower price (US$15,995, about $3,000 less than the "Grand"), sales were low, and it was dropped after 1984.

Thus, at the end of 1984, production reached 20,019 with just one fully equipped version available. The Grand Wagoneer remained "the gold standard of the SUV market", and from 1985, it would continue in one version using the old SJ-body until the end of the Grand Wagoneer production under Chrysler.

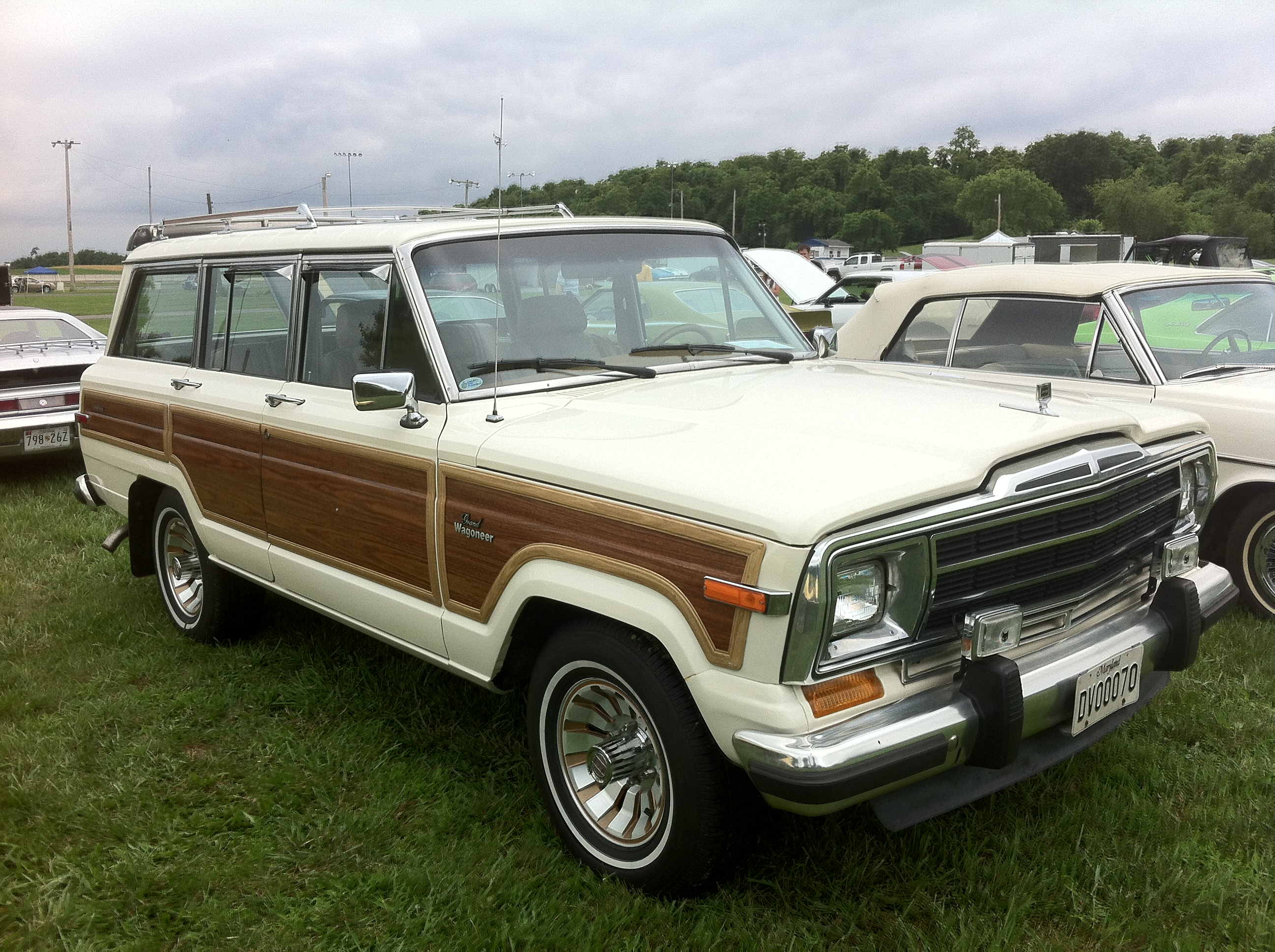
1986 Jeep Grand Wagoneer

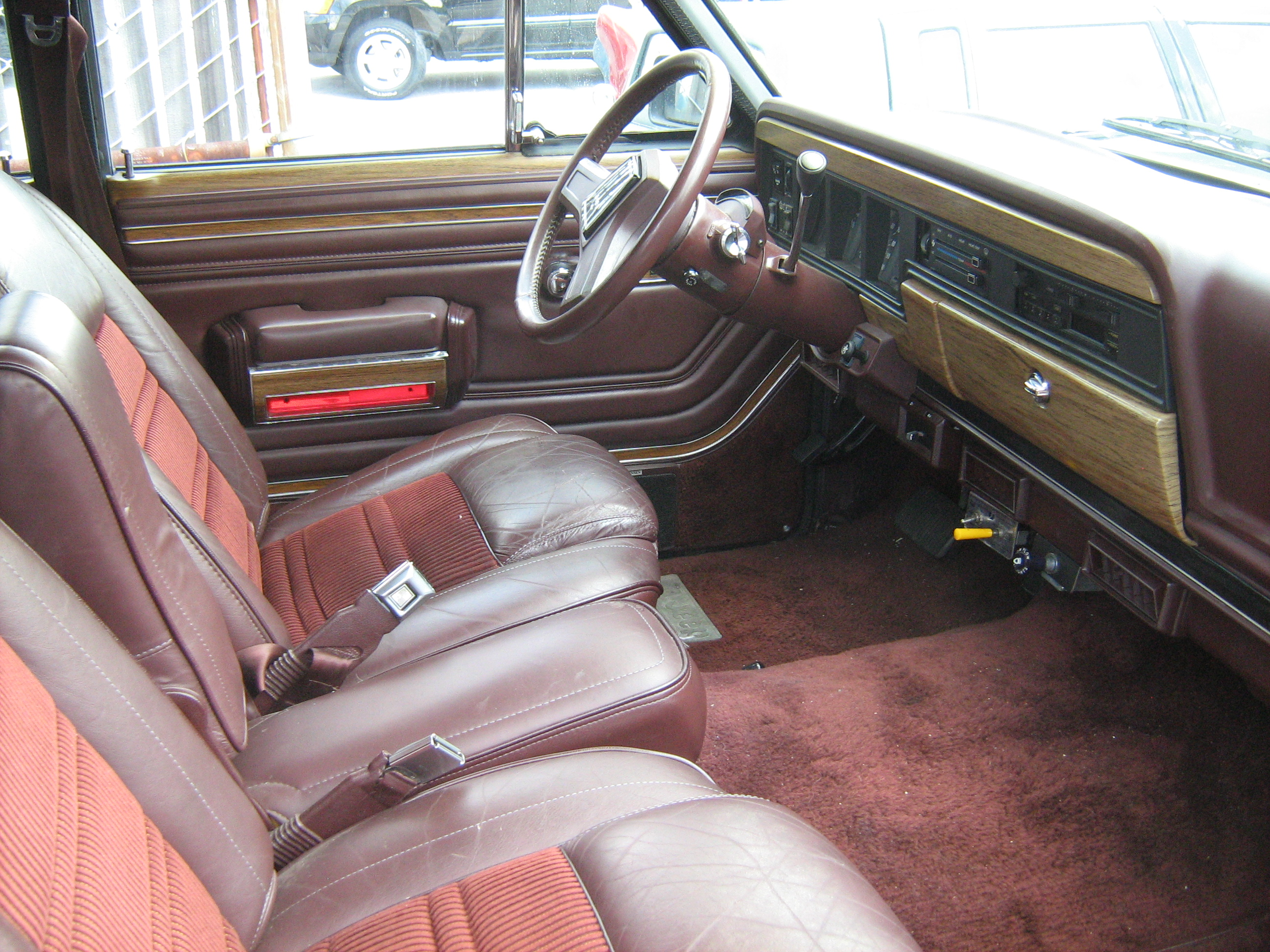
Grand Wagoneer interior

For the Mexican market, the Grand Wagoneer was built and distributed by Vehiculos Automotores Mexicanos, and was offered with the 282 cu in (4.6 L) engine.

=== 1985 ===
An improved handling package was introduced in 1985 that incorporated a revised front sway bar, gas-filled shock absorbers, and lower-friction rear springs. A total of 17,814 Grand Wagoneers were built in 1985.

=== 1986 ===
Starting in the 1986 model year, the Grand Wagoneer received a new four-part front grille and a stand-up hood ornament. An updated audio system became a standard feature, and a power sunroof installed by American Sunroof Corporation became a factory option. However, the most significant change was the installation of a fully revamped interior, including a new dash pad, new instrumentation, new door panel design, shorter nap cut-pile carpeting, new leather, and corduroy seat cover designs, as well as front seats that now featured adjustable headrests. Changes were made to the instrument panel that now featured square gauges and contained an improved climate control system. The metal glove box door was also replaced with a plastic door featuring a woodgrain overlay. A new two-spoke steering wheel also included new stalks for the lights and wipers, and washer controls on the column. The Selec-Trac driveline gained a new Trac-Lok limited-slip differential to send power to the wheel with the best traction. There were 17,254 Grand Wagoneers built in 1986.

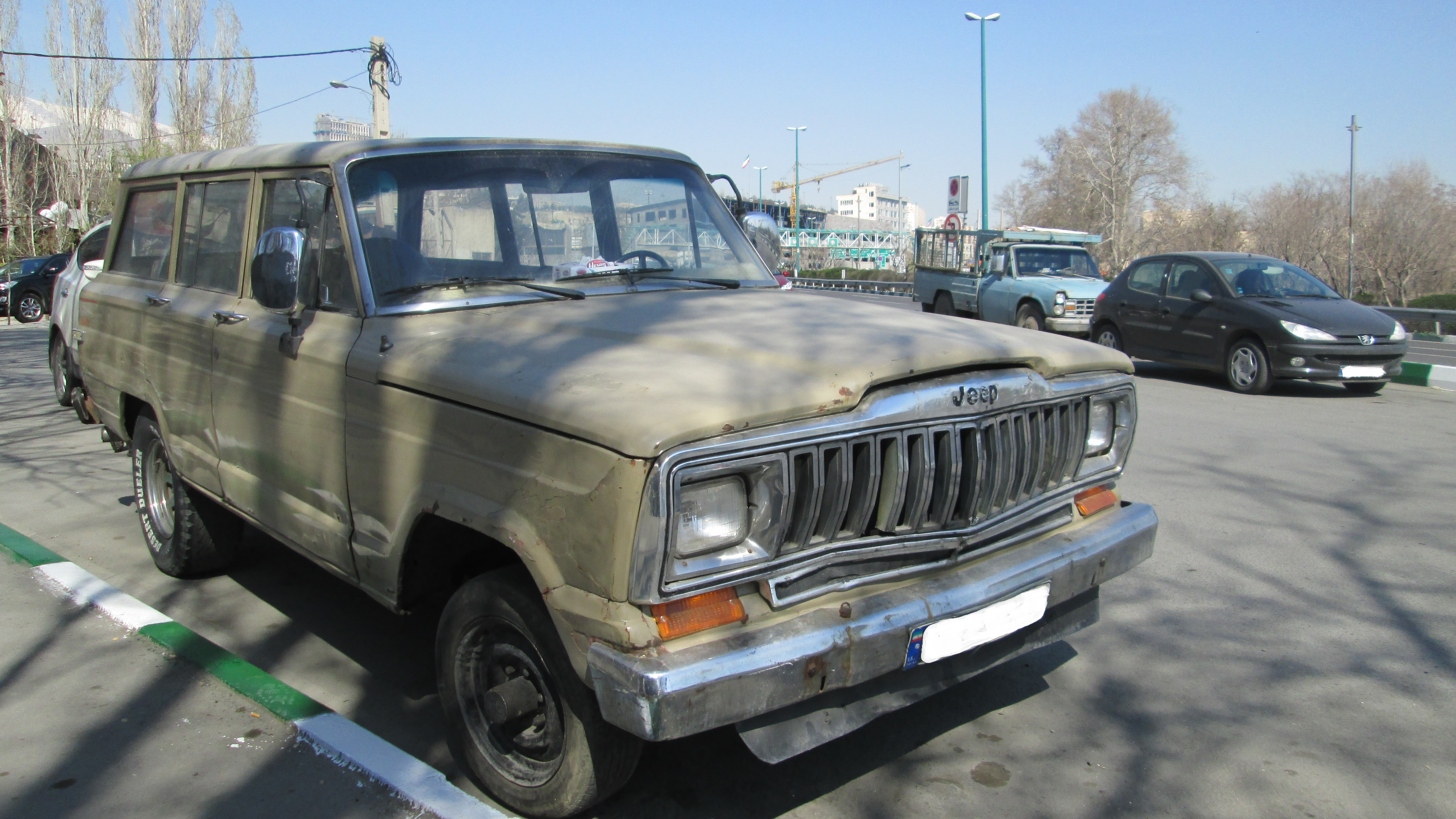
Jeep Ahoo (Ahoo means Deer in Persian), Iranian assembled

=== 1987 ===
The last model year developed under AMC, 1987, was also the 25th anniversary of the Wagoneer design. Standard equipment included the 360 cu in (5.9 L) V8 engine and self-sealing Michelin "Tru Seal" P235/75R 15 radial tires. The sound system included a new AM/FM electronically-tuned stereo with a Dolby cassette player and four Jensen speakers. The exterior featured revised woodgrained sides in "marine teak" with new nameplates and V8 badges. On the inside were new tan or cordovan trims that replaced the honey and garnet colors, while the interior assist pulls on the door panels were removed. A combined 14,265 units were built by AMC and Chrysler in 1987.

Standard equipment for late Grand Wagoneers included:

- 15″ Michelin all-season whitewall radial tires
- 15″ alloy wheels
- AM/FM stereo with cassette player
- Four AccuSound by Jensen premium speakers
- Air conditioning and heater with manual controls
- Dual front power bucket seats
- Leather-wrapped two-spoke steering wheel
- Leather and velour seating surfaces
- Digital quartz dashboard clock
- Full-size glove box
- Roof rack with roof rails
- Chrome front grille with a hood ornament
- Front fog driving lamps
- Power windows and power door locks
- Adjustable tilt steering column
- Dual-note high-low-pitch horn
- Power rear hatch window
- Rear window defroster
- Tinted windows
- Faux wood body side vinyl wood appliques
- Cargo cover
- Overhead console with compass and thermometer (1989–1991)
- Keyless entry (1989–1991)
- Rear window wiper/washer (1989–1991)

Optional equipment included:

- Towing package
- Power sunroof/moonroof

== Chrysler years ==
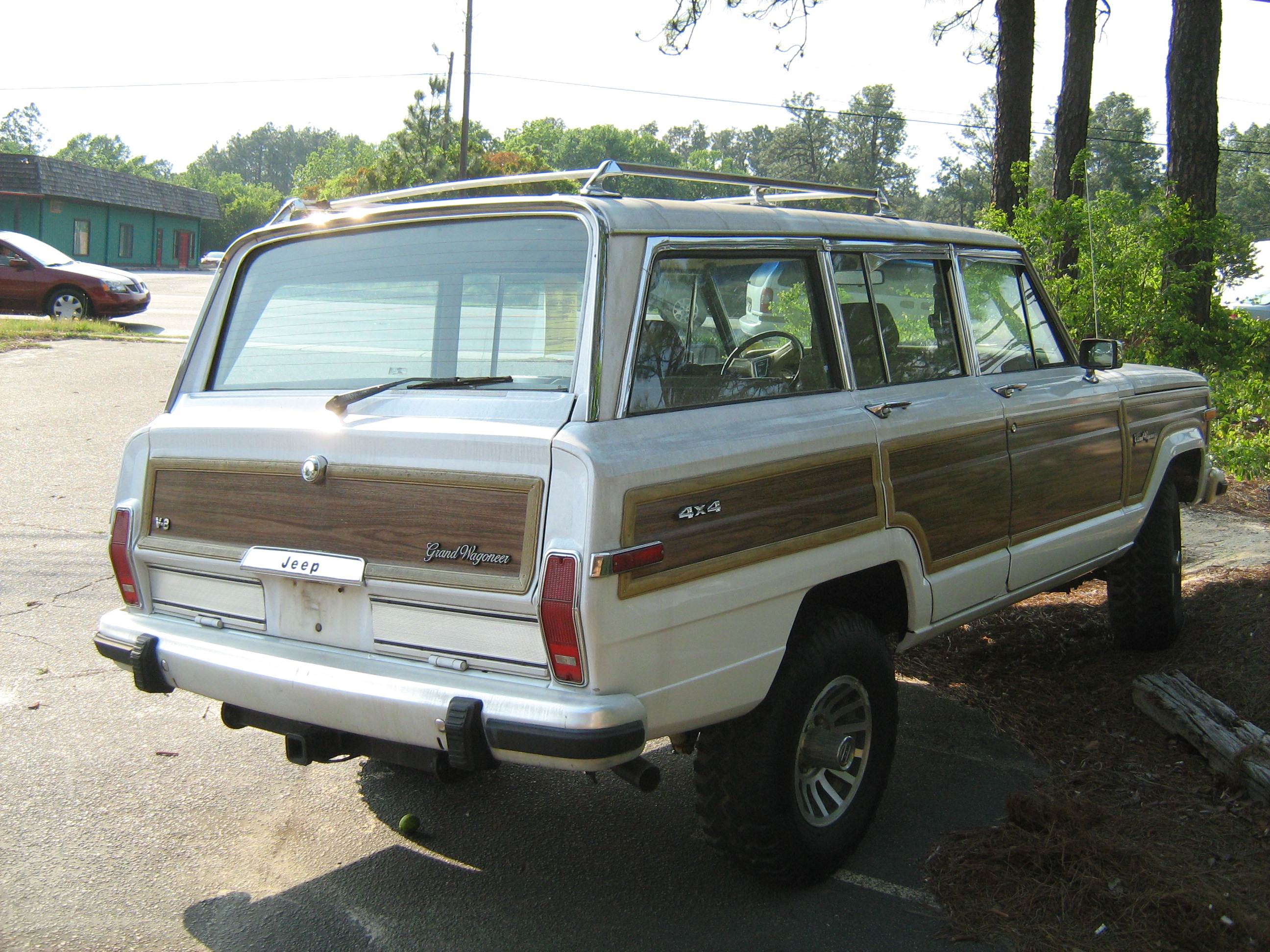
1989–1991 Jeep Grand Wagoneer with rear wiper

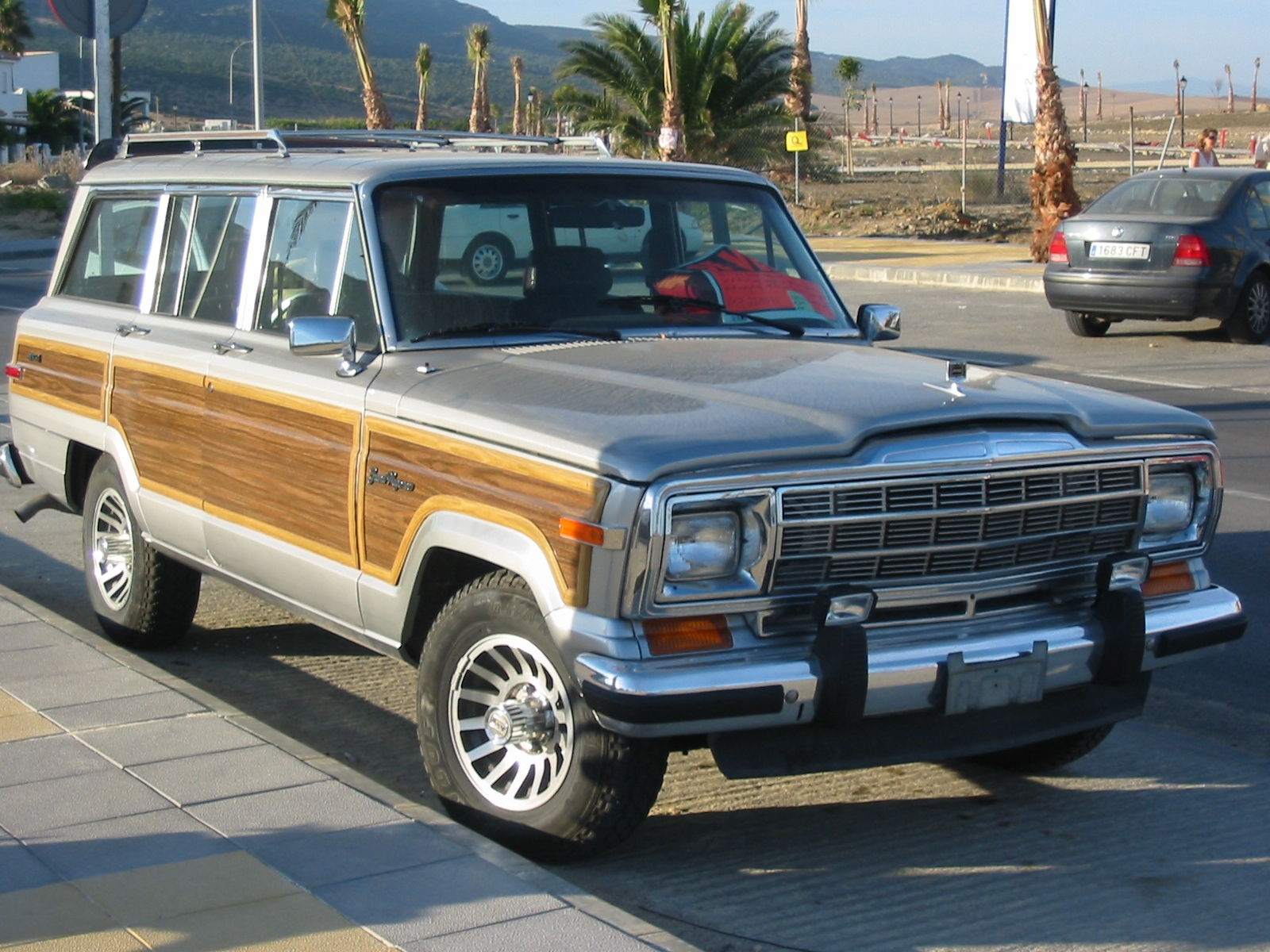
1991 Jeep Grand Wagoneer

=== 1987–1991 ===
Chrysler bought out American Motors Corporation on March 2, 1987. At the time, AMC was already working on designing a replacement for the antiquated SJ platform. Chrysler had other priorities, and although the Jeep J-Series pickups that shared the SJ platform and directly competed with Chrysler's Dodge Ram pickups were discontinued in 1988, Chrysler left the Grand Wagoneer largely untouched over its first few years overseeing Jeep production, and even continued to build the model with the carbureted AMC V8 instead of its own (arguably, more modern) fuel-injected V8. Year-to-year changes were minimal. At the time of Chrysler's purchase, customer demand for the Grand Wagoneer continued to be steady, and it was a very profitable model, generating approximately five to six thousand dollars on each unit.

The 1989–1991 model years are considered the "best of the breed" because of many improvements. These include upgraded wood siding and modernized aluminum alloy wheels that lost their gold-colored inlays in favor of gunmetal grey metallic. Chrysler also introduced an electrocoat primer for better rust-proofing, and all exterior colors were now applied in a two-stage base-clearcoat system. In 1988, Jeep's first full year under Chrysler, a total of 14,117 Grand Wagoneers were produced.

Many improvements were made for the 1989–1991 model year series, including a quality replacement for the earlier, leak-prone air conditioning compressor, the addition of the visually identifiable rear wiper/washer assembly, as well as a general improvement in fit and finish. An interior overhead console, taken from Chrysler's popular minivans, was also added. This functional console featured much brighter map lights, an outside temperature sensor and compass, a storage compartment for sunglasses, as well as an infrared remote-controlled keyless entry system.

The last three model years also featured several new exterior paint colors, and the tan interior color was replaced with a lighter color that Jeep called "sand." The "new" exterior colors included a hunter green metallic that was only available in the 1991 model year and is the paint color of the 1991 Grand Wagoneer in the Chrysler Museum, as well as the color of the very last Grand Wagoneer ever made.

=== Production in Mexico ===
Vehículos Automotores Mexicanos (VAM) assembled variants of AMC automobiles (such as the Gremlin, Pacer, and Javelin) alongside Jeep utility models throughout the 1960s and 1970s. In 1980, Renault acquired AMC's global assets, subsequently inheriting AMC's 40% stake in VAM. By 1982, a severe macroeconomic crisis and the devaluation of the peso led to an overall 40% drop in vehicle sales in Mexico. VAM declared bankruptcy. In 1983, the Mexican government liquidated its shares and transferred management control to Renault. Under Renault, passenger car assembly ended while its underutilized facilities produced the Jeep CJ-7 and Wagoneer (SJ) platforms. By 1987, persistent stagnation in the domestic auto market left the operations financially insolvent, and production ended. The Mexican government ultimately paid Renault US$200 million to fully absorb VAM's remaining financial liabilities and dissolve the company.

Instead of AMC's standard U.S. engines, VAM equipped them with a 282 cu in (4.6 L) I6 engine, producing 315 hp (235 kW) and 218 lb⋅ft (296 N⋅m) of torque. Built in VAM's Lerma, Mexico, plant, it handled low-octane gasoline and high-altitude mountain environments.

The Wagoneer in various iterations, including the base model, the Alpina, and the final run of a special model, the Ambassador. The base model during the 1980s was the most work-utilitarian version, featuring full vinyl upholstery, a floor-mounted four-speed manual transmission, AM radio, 7.00x16 truck-type tires, and no bright trim molding for the windshield or side windows. Some of the Alpina standard upgrades included a three-speed automatic with column shifter, AM/FM stereo radio, 10x15 spoke-style road wheels, fabric and vinyl upholstery with front bucket seats, bright trim around all the windows, and a contrasting side stripe with the model name. Available tires were HRx15 and JRx15 as well as radial and with raised white-letters.

The automaker's final production was a unique Wagoneer version. The 1987 VAM Wagoneer Ambassador featured a luxurious four-seater configuration, in place of the rear bench was a second pair of front seats or captain's chairs. A Landau-style side window treatment partially covered the rear door window and rear side windows. According to most sources, the production run was between 10 and 30 examples available in just two colors — black or white. Standard was an automatic transmission, AM/FM stereo, air conditioning, chrome rooftop luggage racks, power windows, power locks, and power mirrors. Ornamentation included body side moulding and "Ambassador" badges, with most featuring disc-type full wheel covers and whitewall tires.

=== Discontinuation ===
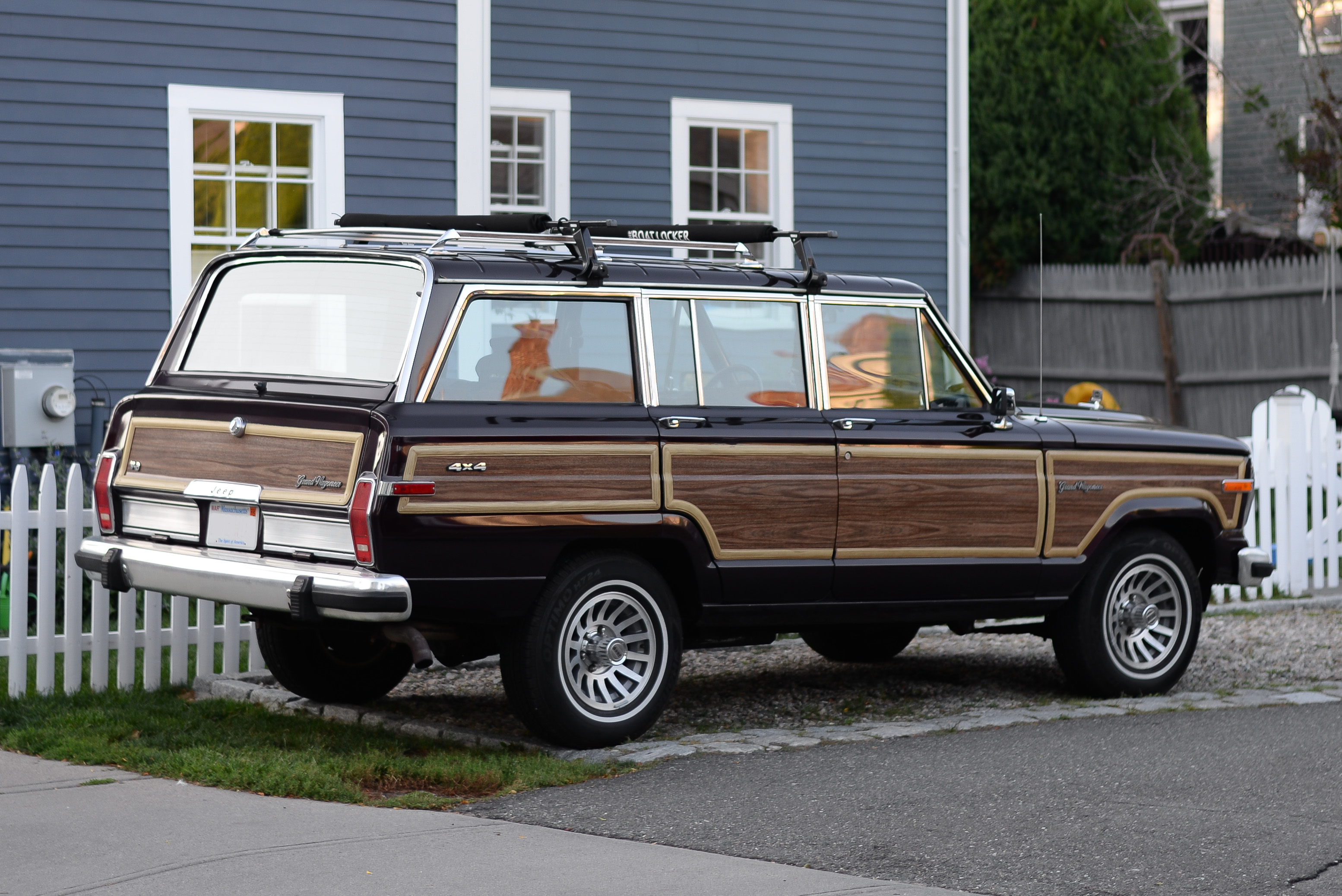
Late 1980s Grand Wagoneer

The Wagoneer enjoyed one of the longest production runs of any Jeep product. Despite its combined fuel economy of 11 mpg_{‑US} (21 L/100 km; 13 mpg_{‑imp}), its powerful 5.9 liter V8 engine and high towing capacity, and the fact that unlike most competitive full-size SUVs of the era it had four doors, made the Grand Wagoneer popular among its many repeat buyers through the 1960s, 70s, and 80s. By 1991, it was the longest-running domestically produced vehicle (29 years) on the same platform.

As a result of the 1990 oil price shock, gasoline prices in the United States rose 11 percent in less than a year. Sales of the gas-guzzling Grand Wagoneer plummeted from over 10,000 units in 1989 to 6,449 in 1990. Slow sales continued during the Gulf War and only 4253 Grand Wagoneers were produced in the 1991 model year. In addition to its poor fuel economy, the antiquated SJ platform would have required extensive re-engineering to comply with new Federal Motor Vehicle Safety Standards that would apply to all light trucks and sport utility vehicles sold in the United States by the mid-1990s. As a result, on February 27, 1991, Chrysler announced that it was ending production of the Grand Wagoneer, leaving the Jeep line without a full-size SUV. Buyers of 1991 Grand Wagoneers sold after that date had the option of having a gold "Final Edition Jeep Grand Wagoneer" badge on the dashboard.

The last SJ Grand Wagoneer produced rolled out of Chrysler's Toledo Assembly Plant on June 21, 1991.

=== Collectibility ===
Even before Chrysler assembled the final SJ Grand Wagoneer, there were specialized companies that were refurbishing and restoring them. Grand Wagoneers that are in top condition seem not to decrease in value.

Automotive experts consider the 1989–1991 model years "the best of the breed and still have a loyal following among a select group." Today, later model, low mileage, and rust-free Grand Wagoneers are highly collectible, with pristine examples selling for above their original sticker price decades later.

In 2013, the 1963–1991 models were in a list of eight SUVs that have become collectibles and, depending on the condition, desirable items at car auctions.

By 2019, the appraisal values of Grand Wagoneers had been increasing an average of 2–6 percent with each bi-monthly update for most of past ten years according to Hagerty.

By 2021, the 1984 through 1991 Jeep Grand Wagoneers that "created the blueprint followed by countless others" were among the most sought-after cars during the COVID-19 pandemic, according to Hagerty, and in the top nine of a curated list of the best vintage cars on the market.

== 1993: Grand Wagoneer (ZJ) ==
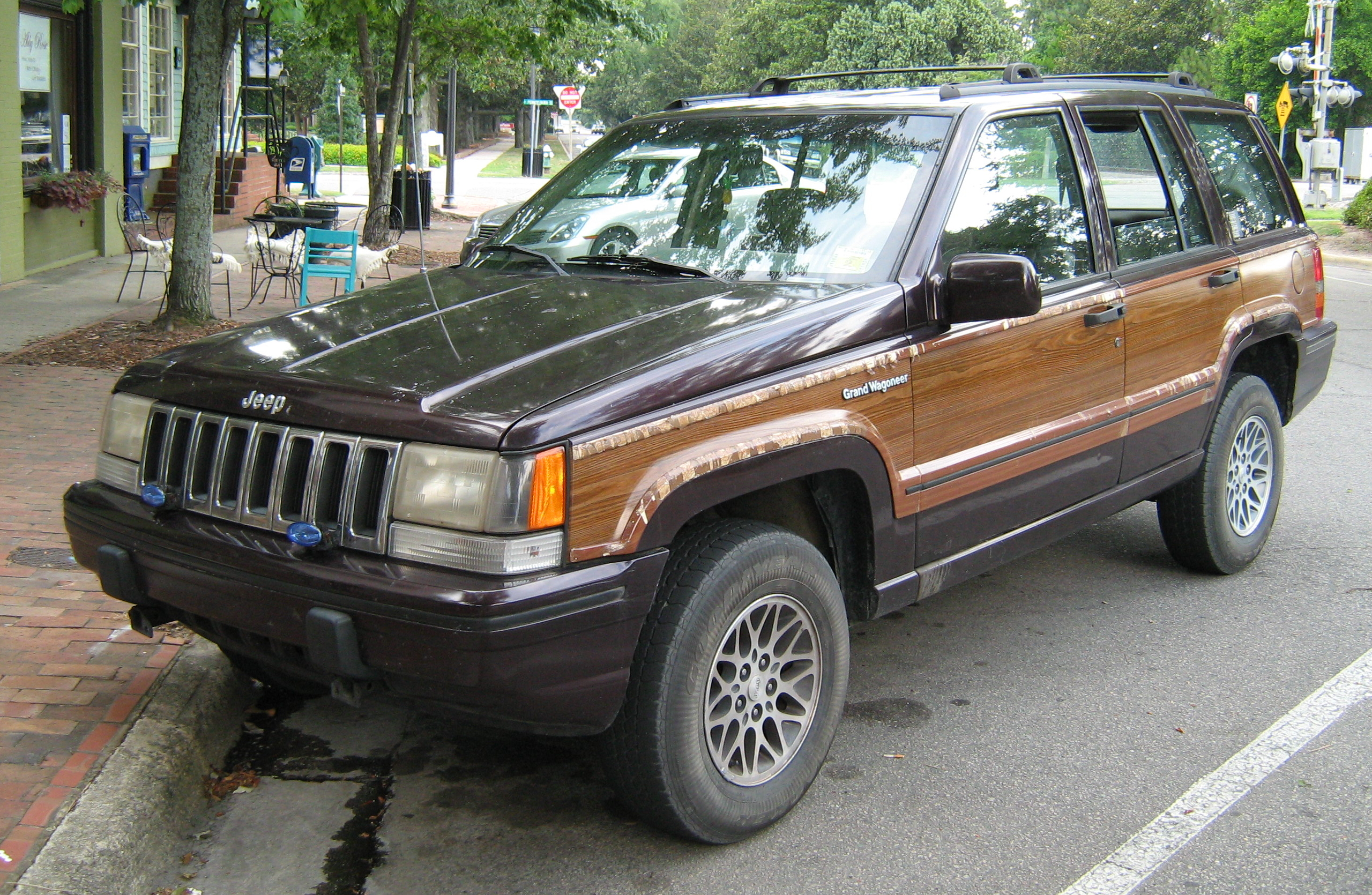
1993 Jeep Grand Wagoneer (ZJ)

The Jeep Grand Wagoneer nameplate reappeared for one year as the top-of-the-line model of the new Jeep ZJ platform debuted for the Grand Cherokee for the 1993 model year. It featured a long list of standard equipment including the Magnum 5.2 L V8 engine and unique leather interior as well as the Grand Wagoneer's traditional exterior woodgrain applique. After 6,378 were produced, the model was dropped for 1994, leaving the Grand Cherokee Limited as the top-of-the-line Jeep.

== Motor sport ==
The Wagoneer was occasionally used in rallying, mainly in the United States. Wagoneers placed first and second in the first-ever running of the Sno*Drift rally in 1973.

A Grand Wagoneer also competed in the grueling 9,000-mile (14,484 km) 1988 Trans-Amazon Rally.

== Revival ==
Chrysler Group CEO Sergio Marchionne announced at the January 2011 North American International Auto Show held in Detroit, that the Grand Wagoneer name was to be revived for an "upper-scale" seven-seat SUV, which he said would be introduced in 2013. In May 2014, Chrysler's "Five-Year Plan" was unveiled, which included the intention to release a flagship vehicle called the Grand Wagoneer that would share a platform with the Durango and Grand Cherokee by the 2018 model year. The Grand Wagoneer would be sold alongside the Durango and the Grand Cherokee.

On 9 June 2015, Fiat Chrysler announced that it would unveil a new version of the full-sized Grand Wagoneer at its dealers' convention on 25 August 2015. In August 2015, however, Fiat announced that the production of the upcoming Grand Cherokee replacement would be delayed into 2018. It was scheduled to be built at Warren Truck Assembly while the next-generation Ram 1500 was to be built at Sterling Heights Assembly.

On 3 September 2020, Jeep revealed the concept vehicle, along with other models and their 4xe electric hybrid technology.

On 11 March 2021, Jeep officially revealed the Wagoneer and Grand Wagoneer models, with both being based on the concept.

== See also ==
- Jerrari
