= AMC and Jeep transmissions =

Mechanical gears in cars

Vehicles made by American Motors Corporation (AMC) and Jeep incorporated a variety of transmissions and transfer case systems. This article covers transmissions used in the following vehicle models and years:

- All American Motors (AMC) passenger cars, 1954-1988
- Jeep Cherokee XJ (1984–2001)
- Jeep Comanche (1986-1992)
- Jeep CJ (1976–1986)
- Jeep Grand Cherokee WJ (1999–2004)
- Jeep Grand Cherokee ZJ (1993–1998)
- Jeep Wagoneer/Grand Wagoneer (1963–1993)
- Jeep Wrangler YJ (1987–1995)

== Transmissions ==
Transmissions are a mechanical component of a vehicle that transfers power from the engine to the wheels. They allow the engine to operate within a set range of speeds. Various gear ratios are used to multiply the engine torque when a greater pull force is needed (like when a car starts from a stopped position, or is driving up a hill), or to reduce the engine speed at higher vehicle speeds. There are two types of transmissions: manual and automatic. Manual transmission require the driver to select specific gears, while automatic transmissions select the gears by themselves. AMC and Jeep vehicles have used a mix of manual and automatic transmissions in their car models over the years, largely due to specific vehicle, engine, model year, and drivetrain configuration.

In the four-wheel drive AMC and Jeep vehicles, the transmission is usually connected to a transfer case, which distributes the engine power to the vehicle's drive axles. The design of the transmission directly affects the compatibility with other drivetrain components. For instance, in the later AMC transmissions, 21-spline or 23-spline output shafts were used which corresponded to compatible transfer-case inputs. Other factors like gear ratios, bell housing patterns, or output-shaft dimensions also vary across transmissions and affect which engines and transfer cases can be used in junction.

=== Manual ===
The following manual transmissions have been used in the vehicles listed above:

- Aisin AX4 four-speed (used with 4 cyl and 2.8 L V6)
- Aisin AX5 five-speed (used with 4 cyl and 2.8 L V6)
- Aisin AX15 five-speed (used with 4.0 L from 1989)
- Borg-Warner HR1 four-speed synchronized unit (used only with the 121-4 engine)
- Borg-Warner SR4 four-speed synchronized unit (late-1970s/early-1980s 6 cylinder and 304 V8)
- Borg-Warner T4 four-speed (used only after 1981)
- Borg-Warner T5 five-speed (used only after 1981)
- Borg-Warner T10 four-speed (car only)
- Borg-Warner T14 three-speed
- Borg-Warner T15 three-speed
- Borg-Warner T18 four-speed (4:1 first gear)
- Borg-Warner T18A four-speed (6:1 first gear)
- Borg-Warner T85 three-speed
- Borg-Warner T86 three-speed
- Borg-Warner T89 three-speed
- Borg-Warner T96 three-speed
- Borg-Warner T90 three-speed
- Borg-Warner T98 four-speed
- Peugeot BA-10/5 five-speed
- Tremec T176 four-speed (used with AMC 6-cylinder, ISUZU 4L Diesel and 304 V8 engines)
- Tremec T177 four-speed (used only from 1980 to 1988 in full size Jeeps with V8)
- Tremec T150 three-speed (also called 150T)

=== Automatic ===
The following automatic transmissions have been used in the vehicles listed above:

- Borg-Warner M8, M10, M11A, M11B and M12; cast-iron three-speed automatic with torque converter; used in many AMC 6- and V8-cylinder passenger cars built between 1957 and 1971. These transmissions were either air-cooled with fins on the torque converter and ducts in the bell housing adapter (six cylinder applications) or liquid-cooled, and were marketed under the name "Flash-O-Matic."
- Borg-Warner M35, M36, and M37. Three-speed gear set with torque converter, air-cooled. Used in the Rambler American 6-cylinder cars between 1963 and 1969 as "Flash-O-Matic."
- Borg-Warner M40, M42, M43, and M44. 3-speed with torque converter, water-cooled. Used in AMC 6- and V8 engines between 1970 and 1971; also the 290 2-bbl V8 engine between 1967 and 1969 (M40). Marketed as "Shift-Command."
- Aisin-Warner AW4 four-speed; from 1987 in XJ and MJ with 4.0 L and some 2.5 L.
- GM THM400 three-speed with AMC pattern from 1974 to 1979 and Buick Nailhead case with adapter rings to fit AMC 327, Buick 350 and V6 as well as AMC V8 before 1974
- Chrysler 45RFE four-speed
- Chrysler 545RFE five-speed (used with 5.7 L Hemi engine and VM Motori 2.8 L Turbo Diesel, same as 45RFE used with 4.7 L, but different software enabling a second overdrive)
- TorqueFlite 998 three-speed; used with the 4.2 L I6 in most AMC cars and 304 V8s.
- TorqueFlite 904 or 909 (lockup) three-speed; used with the 2.5 L I4 or 3.8/4.2 L I6 in most AMC cars from 1972 to 1983, and also from 1980 to 1987 Jeeps, as well as with the 2.0 L Audi engine in Postal Jeeps
- TorqueFlite A727 three-speed; used in AMC Jeep applications with V8 and some I6 engines (can be swapped into Eagles, etc., for 998 replacement)
- TorqueFlite A727 with Mopar big block pattern and adapter to Nissan SD33 diesel (CJ10A tugs mostly. Shared with IH Scouts)
- TorqueFlite 30RH three-speed; 1984-96 2.5 L XJ Cherokee
- TorqueFlite 32RH three-speed; 1994 4.0 L XJ Cherokee (limited use export only)
- TorqueFlite 32 RH three-speed; 19974.0 L TJ Wrangler
- TorqueFlite 42RE four-speed; 1994-96 4.0 L Grand Cherokee, 1996 V8 Grand Cherokee
- TorqueFlite 44RH four-speed; 1994 Grand Cherokee (limited use)
- TorqueFlite 44RE four-speed; 1996 Grand Cherokee
- TorqueFlite 46RH four-speed; 1993-95 5.2 L Grand Cherokee
- TorqueFlite 46RE four-speed
- Ultradrive 42RLE four-speed

==== Aisin-Warner ====
The Aisin-Warner four-speed automatic transmission (AW4) was co-designed by AMC and Borg Warner, and built by Aisin in their new facility for use with the Cherokee XJ's 4.0L inline six cylinder engine. It was manufactured by Aisin-Warner, a member of the Toyota group, in partnership with Borg-Warner. It shares many parts with the Aisin 450-43LE that is used in Toyota off-road vehicles.

The AW4 is also used behind the 2.5 L (150 CID) AMC Straight-4 engine. It has a removable bell housing with a mount for the crankshaft position sensor. Early AW4s used 21-spline output shafts. In 1991 the AW4 was changed to a 23-spline output shaft, concurrent with adoption of the High Output (commonly known as H.O.) inline six-cylinder engine. Some sources state that the output shaft spline change occurred for the 1990 model year. The change most likely occurred during the 1990 model run with early 1990 models receiving 21-spline transmission and later models receiving 23-spline. If swapping transmissions in 1990 model year vehicles either swap the transfer case as well or make sure to check spline count. The input on the transfer case can also be changed to match the output shaft spline count. Rear-wheel-drive-only transmissions all have the same spline count on the output shaft, only 4x4 models are affected by differing spline count.

Gear Ratios for the AW4:

- 1st: 2.80
- 2nd: 1.53
- 3rd: 1.00
- 4th: 0.75 (23-spline, 0.705 21-spline)

Models that used the AW4:

- 1987–2001 Jeep Cherokee (XJ) 4.0 L
- 1993–1993.5 Jeep Grand Cherokee (ZJ) 4.0 L
- 1987–1992 Jeep Comanche 2.5 L
- 1987–1992 Jeep Comanche 4.0 L

==== Chrysler/TorqueCommand ====
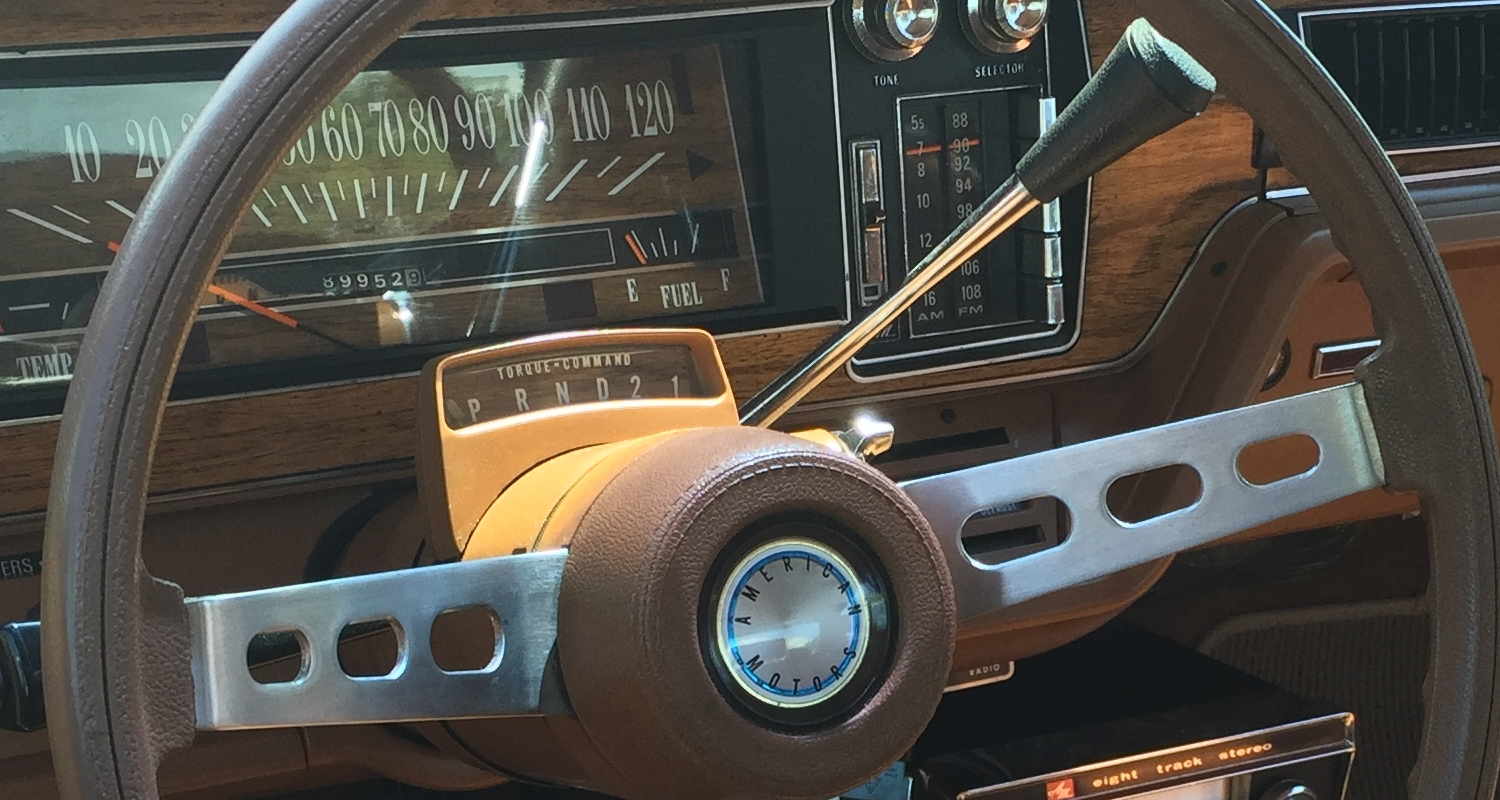
Torque-Command steering column-mounted gear selector

For the 1972 model year, American Motors Corporation (AMC) made a significant shift in its automatic transmission strategy, discontinuing its long-standing use of BorgWarner units and beginning the purchase of variations of the robust Chrysler-developed TorqueFlite transmission. AMC branded these transmissions as TorqueCommand. Starting with the 1980 model year, the Chrysler automatic replaced GM's Hydramatic automatic transmissions in Jeep vehicles.

All TorqueCommand automatic transmissions have a 23-spline output shaft. A characteristic of these transmissions is a high degree of internal commonality with Chrysler's TorqueFlite units. Beyond the bell housing pattern (integral to the main transmission case) and the torque converter, the AMC versions are identical to their Chrysler counterparts, with most internal components interchangeable.

However, a crucial distinction lay in the torque converter and flexplate design. Unlike Chrysler torque converters, which typically featured a pressed-on ring gear for the starter teeth, AMC's TorqueCommand transmissions have a traditional 164-tooth flexplate similar to Ford's. This means that torque converters are not interchangeable between AMC and Chrysler applications, despite the internal similarities of the transmission units.

As AMC evolved its engine lineup, including introducing lighter casting technologies for its mainstay engines, the TorqueCommand transmissions were adapted with various bell housing patterns to accommodate different applications. This flexibility allowed AMC to integrate the transmissions across a wide range of vehicles and engines, both in-house and outsourced:

- AMC I6 and V8 engines (late model pattern) - The primary application for the TorqueCommand was with AMC's I6 and V8 engines. These transmissions featured a specific "AMC late model pattern" bell housing. This pattern was used with 232, 258, and 4.0 L I6s, as well as the 304, 360, and 401 V8s.
- AMC 150 (2.5L) I4 (Chevrolet small V6 pattern) - This four-cylinder application adopted the General Motors small V6 engine bolt pattern. This decision was strategic, as the new AMC 2.5 L engine replaced the I4 engines AMC purchased from GM. Furthermore, AMC continued to source the 2.8 L V6 from GM until the introduction of the AMC 4.0 L I6 in 1987, and both the 2.5 L I4 and GM's V6 shared common drivetrain components in Jeep vehicles. This pattern was used in 1980 and later CJs, and from 1980 to early 1983 AMC Eagles equipped with the I4 engine. The 2.5 L engine maintained this GM 60-degree V6 pattern through the end of its production, a pattern also shared with some front-wheel-drive Cadillac engines.
- Audi 2.0 L I4 (a limited pattern) - From 1979 through 1981, AMC also utilized a 904 TorqueCommand variant with an Audi 2.0 L engine.

== Transfer cases ==
The transfer case is an auxiliary transmission that connects the front and rear axles. It also commonly provides a selectable secondary gear reduction. AMC and Jeep vehicles have used several different transfer cases in their various models.

Summary of AMC/Jeep Transfer Cases

Case	Offset	Spline	Ratio	Bolt Pattern	Years Used
Borg-Warner 13-39	Both left	10	2.57:1	THM400	1973–1979
Dana 18	Both left	6 (10)	1.98:1, 2.42:1, 2.46:1	Texas	1940–1971
Dana 20	Front left	6 (10)	2.03:1	Texas	1963–1979
Dana 300	Front left	23	2.62:1	Round (New Process)	1980–1986

See below for further information on New Process/New Venture transfer cases.

=== Dana ===
Jeep has used three different transfer cases made by the Spicer Division of Dana Holding Corporation. They are the 18, 20, and 300 models.

==== Dana 18 ====
The Dana 18 is a gear driven part-time transfer case. Both the front and rear output shafts are offset towards the passenger side of the vehicle. Drive modes offered include 2-wheel high, part-time 4-wheel high, and part-time 4-wheel Low. All Dana 18 cases are cast iron and use the "Texas" bolt pattern with five bolts holding on the transfer case. There are five variations:

- 27-tooth drive gear, 3/4" intermediate shaft and 1.98:1 low range, 3 in (76 mm) input hole
- 26-tooth input gear, 3/4" intermediate shaft and 2.42:1 low range, 3 in (76 mm) input hole
- 26-tooth input gear, 1 1/8 in (29 mm) intermediate shaft and 2.42:1 low range, 3 in (76 mm) input hole
- 26-tooth input gear, 1 1/4 in (32 mm) intermediate shaft and 2.42:1 low range, 3 in (76 mm) input hole
- 29-tooth input gear, 1 1/4 in (32 mm) intermediate shaft and 2.46:1 low range, 4 in (100 mm) input hole, Dana 20 case

The normal (3") input Dana 18s are interchangeable, but the input gear must match the transfer case. The "big hole" (4" input) Dana 18 is transmission-interchangeable with the Dana 20. Almost all Dana 18 and Dana 20 input gears are 6-spline; the only exception is the one used with the 10-spline version of the T14 transmission. Some International Scout Dana 20s with a 727 automatic transmission use a 23 spline 26 tooth gear

All Dana 18s have front and rear outputs offset to the right side. Most vehicles built with a Dana 18 have the rear axle offset to the right side to accommodate this. Most other transfer cases used in Jeeps have a centered rear output that lines up with the input shaft. The Dana 18 always has gears turning, which makes it noisier then some other transfer cases when in two-wheel-drive mode.

Applications:

- 1941-1945 Willys MB
- 1950-1952 Willys M38
- Jeep CJ
- Jeep Forward Control
- Willys Jeep Wagon
- 1941-1971 Willys Jeep Truck

==== Dana 20 ====
The Dana 20 can be identified by the center rear output, cast iron construction, and deep oil pan. Like the Dana 18, it uses the Texas bolt pattern to hold the transfer case in place. This is a heavy-duty, gear-driven part-time transfer case with a 26-tooth input gear. The output for the front drive shaft is on the right side and the rear output is in line with the input. This enables 2-wheel High to be direct-drive, which is quieter. Otherwise the Dana 20 offers the same drive modes as the Dana 18. Its low range has a ratio of 2.03:1.

The Dana 20 is generally compatible with the "big hole" Dana 18. One exception is the version used with the THM400 in full-size Jeep trucks, which used a different spline number on the input gear.

Applications:

- Jeep CJ
- Jeep SJ
- 1963-1979 Willys-Overland Jeepster
- 1979 International Scout with 727TF AT uses the 23 spline 26 tooth gear.

==== Dana 21 ====
The Dana 21 part-time gear system with single-speed case with automatic transmission. The Dana 21 is essentially a Dana 20 without a low range (offering only 2-wheel high and part-time 4-wheel high).

Applications:

- 1963-1969 Jeep SJ
- 1963-1969 Jeep Gladiator

==== Dana 300 ====
The Dana 300 part-time gear-driven transfer case. That uses a round bolt pattern and has a nearly flat oil pan. It is a heavy-duty, gear-driven transfer case with a 23-spline input shaft. The case is cast iron but the tail housing is aluminum. The ID number C300-15 is stamped on the case. The output for the front drive shaft is on the right side and the rear output in line with the input. Low range is 2.62:1.

One common modification of the Dana 300 is to add oil paddles to the main shaft to prevent oil starvation of the rear bearing.

The Dana 300 was used in Jeep CJs from 1980 to 1986. The 1980 factory original came with a shorter tail housing and a longer rear drive shaft. The Dana 300 should fit behind all TorqueCommand 4x4 transmissions.

Applications:

- 1980-1986 Jeep CJ

=== New Process/New Venture ===
In general, New Process transfer cases are identified by a three-digit code. The first digit (1 or 2) determines the number of gear ranges. The second digit is a series number that reflects design, and provides minimal information about torque handling. For example, if the second digit is a 1, there is no two-wheel-drive option; if it is a 2, 2WD is available. Other numbers have similar meanings. The third digit indicates differential type: 1 means locked (no differential), 2 means open, 3 means electric locked, 4 and 5 both indicate an asymmetrical torque split planetary gear and gear drive, 6 means an electronic clutch pack, 7 means a hydraulic clutch pack (except for the unique 207), and 9 means a viscous coupler.

The AMC Eagle used three New Process transfer cases (Models 119, 128, and 129) that were single speed versions of the models (219, 228, and 229) that were used in 1980 and newer Jeeps. There was no difference between the Eagle versions and the Jeep versions other than the addition of a low range, indicated by the 2 as the first digit.

New Process transfer cases are chain-driven and use a circular 6 bolt, 23-spline input on the case. The output for the front drive shaft is on the left side. The New Process transfer cases used by AMC attach the same as the Dana 300 except that New Process cases have the front output on the left side. Interchange ('flip') is possible, but there is an indexing lug in the pattern, in an attempt to allow the transfer case to attach in only one position. Thus, some modification on the transfer case or the adapter is required.

Because of changes in the name of the manufacturing company, new versions of the NP231 and NP242 are referred to as NV (New Venture) or NVG (New Venture Gear).

New Process Transfer Cases Used in AMC/Jeep Vehicles

	119	128	129	147	207	208	219	228	229	231	241 OR	242	247	249 †
Full-Time High	Yes	Yes	Yes	Yes	No	No	Yes	Yes	Yes	No	No	Yes	Yes	Yes
High Lock	No	No	No	--	Yes	Yes	Yes	No	No	Yes	Yes	Yes	No	No
Low Range	No	No	No	No	2.61:1	2.62:1	Yes	Yes	Yes	2.72:1	4.0:1	2.72:1	2.72:1	2.72:1
2wd	No	Yes	Yes	No	Yes	Yes	No	Yes	Yes	Yes	Yes	Yes	No	No
Differential	Viscous	Open	Viscous	Gyro-Clutch	Locked	--	Viscous	Open	Viscous	Locked	Locked	Open	Gyro-Clutch	Viscous

↑ The 249 was available in two versions. The early (1993–1996) version had no differential lock and the viscous coupling spanned the center differential, creating a 50/50 torque split. The later version (1996 and beyond) had a viscous front drive, creating a rear torque bias, but included a provision to lock the center differential.

== Overdrives and underdrives ==
Borg-Warner overdrive was available from early 1960 to 1969. The Borg-Warner overdrive case is 11 3/4 inches (300 mm) long (less torque tube adapter, if required), including the 1 1/2-inch-thick (38 mm) adapter. A complete T96 with overdrive is 18 3/4 inches (480 mm) long from front of case to end of tailshaft housing. The overdrive unit is the same for all.

The Dana 18 has a power take-off (PTO) attachment on the case that can be used to drive equipment that accepts PTO input. A unique feature of the Dana 18 is the overdrive that attaches in the PTO port in the back of the system. An adapter allows use of both the overdrive and the PTO attachment, but it is no longer produced.

Laycock de Normanville overdrive was available from 1974 through 1976 for inline six engines with the 150T and for V8 torque tube cars with the T89.

== Transmission to transfer case adapters and clocking ==
Transmissions end with a splined tail shaft, more commonly called an output shaft. When one or more auxiliary units are bolted to the main transmission, these are called adapters, extension housings, or tail housings. All factory applications with a four-wheel drive transfer case require an adapter, and many upgrade transmissions that would otherwise be incompatible can be adapted to Jeep transfer cases.

Clocking refers to the angle at which the transfer case is tilted with reference to the horizontal plane. Stock Jeep clocking for the Dana 300 (1980–1986) is usually 23° and stock Eagle and Jeep/New Process clocking is usually 13°. Many factors, most notably ground clearance and front drive shaft clearance, can necessitate a change in the clocking angle. Some aftermarket adapters feature flanges with multiple clocking options.

== Bell housings ==
The bell housing bolt pattern for the old AMC 196 Straight-6 engine is the same as for the more modern early 199 and 232 (used from 1964 to 1971), but the 196 had different dowel pin sizes. AMC's 1956 to 1966 V8s used a different bell housing bolt pattern that was slightly larger in diameter than the six cylinder bell. When AMC discontinued their first V8 engine design after 1966, the bell housing changed; all 1966-up V8 bell housing bolt patterns are the same. The bell housing for six-cylinder engines changed to match the V8 in 1972 when AMC switched from Borg-Warner to Chrysler transmissions automatic. The flywheel also changed from 153 teeth (a common Chevy size) to 164 teeth (a common Ford size). Starter motors used with the 1966-up V8 bellhousing were sourced from Motorcraft which interchanges with the Ford V8 and some of their inline sixes (which uses a separate starter solenoid) - the Jeep 4.0 L uses a Mitsubishi-designed starter which has an integrated solenoid which is lighter in weight but retaining the two mounting bolts with a threaded top hole and unthreaded hole which bolts to the transmission bellhousing.

The Iron Duke I4 used by AMC in Jeeps from 1980 to 1983 used the standard small block Chevrolet bolt pattern bell housing. The later (1984-02) AMC I4 had the GM 60 degree V6/I4 bolt pattern, and this was retained for the life of the engine. AMC often used lighter duty transmissions with the four cylinder engines.

Engine family	Bell housing style	Flywheel/Flexplate
'56-'66 V8 Engines	AMC '56-66 V8	--
Early AMC I6	AMC (Nash design, pre '64) I6	153 teeth
Tornado 230 I6	Continental	--
'66-'91 V-8	AMC Late Model	164 teeth
72-06 AMC I6	AMC Late Model	164 teeth
Buick 225 V6	BOP V8	153 teeth
Iron Duke	Chevrolet V8	--
AMC 150 I4	GM 60 degree V6	--

== See also ==
- Jeep four-wheel-drive systems

Companies

- American Motors
- Jeep
- Willys-Overland
- Kaiser Motors
- AM General

Parts

- BorgWarner
- New Venture Gear
- Transmission Technologies Corporation Tremec
- Transfer case
- Transmission
- TorqueFlite
