= Powertech =

Powertech may refer to:

- Hyundai Powertech, a South Korean automatic transmission manufacturer
- PowerTech (flashlight manufacturer), Tennessee manufacturer
- Powertech Technology, PTI, Taiwanese chip assembler
- PowerTech Information Systems, Norwegian IP
- Chrysler PowerTech engine (V6 and V8 engines)
- Chrysler PowerTech engine (disambiguation) (I4 and I6 engines)

== See also ==
- Powertec RPA
- Powertek
