= Renix =

Joint venture by Renault and Bendix

Renix (Renix Electronique) was a joint venture by Renault and Bendix that designed and manufactured automobile electronic ignitions, fuel injection systems, electronic automatic transmission controls, and various engine sensors. Major applications included various Renault and Volvo vehicles. The name became synonymous in the U.S. with the computer and fuel injection system used on the AMC/Jeep 2.5 L I4 and 4.0 L I6 engines.

== Use of name ==
The term Renix also has several applications. In specific carburetor equipped Renault and Volvo models, it provides an electronic ignition system consisting of an engine control unit (ECU) to replace the job of contact breaker points in the distributor. The system uses an angle sensor and several fuel sensors to provide a maintenance-free ignition system. The ECU is sealed and cannot be serviced, and the EPROM cannot be re-programmed.

Later, the name was synonymous with a form of fuel injection. In such an application, it consists of an ECU and many sensors. It was first seen in engines produced by Renault (Renault 21, 25, and Espace) in 2.0 L (122 cu in) and 2.2 L (134 cu in) capacities. It is better known in America for its application in the AMC 4.0 L displacing 3,960 cc (242 cu in) straight-6 engines. Production began by American Motors Corporation (AMC) with the 1987 Jeep Cherokee (XJ) models. It was preceded by the AMC Computerized Engine Control and followed by Chrysler's Mopar MPI system.

== Renix Electronique ==
Renix Electronique S.A. was established in 1981 as a joint venture by Renault with 51% interest and Bendix with 49% that was headquartered in Toulouse. Renix Corporation of America was the North American subsidiary of Renix Electronique to provide sales, logistics, engineering, and quality support to American Motors.

When Renault encountered financial troubles in 1985, it sold its interest in Renix to AlliedSignal, a major auto industry supplier and the new owner of Bendix. Renix Corporation of America was also absorbed by AlliedSignal Corporation when it purchased Renix Electronique from Renault. The US$200 million Allied buyout of Renault's 51% of Renix made it part of Bendix Electronics and Engine Controls. Renix products are produced in France and marketed worldwide under the Bendix brand name. In 1988, the French Bendix site was sold to Siemens VDO. In 2008, Siemens AG sold its VDO branch to Continental Automotive Group.

== Renault applications ==
The Renix system was used in the F series engines as fitted to the Renault 19 16V, Renault 21, Renault 25, and the Renault Espace. It is a multi-point fuel injection system, as opposed to a single-point system, with several air, throttle, and pinking sensors and an advanced computer. Application of the system could first be seen in 1984, three years before its American debut. The Renix system pushed the power of the carburetor-fed 1,995 cc (122 cu in) engine from 104–120 bhp (78–89 kW). It could also be found in 2.2 L engines fitted to R21, R25, and Espace models.

The Renix fuel injection and a Garrett turbocharger were used in the mid-mounted V6 powering the Renault Alpine GTA/A610 sports car.

== AMC/Jeep applications ==
The fully integrated electronic engine control system made by Renix consists of a solid-state Ignition Control Module (ICM), a distributor, a crankshaft position sensor, and an Electronic Control Unit (ECU). The Renix ECU has a powerful microprocessor that was advanced technology for its time. It also incorporates an engine knocking sensor that allows the computer to know if detonation is occurring, thus allowing the computer to make adaptive control by individual cylinder corrections to prevent pinging. The knock detection uses the signal from a wide band accelerometer mounted on the cylinder head. Good signal-to-noise ratio is obtained primarily through angular discrimination.

The Renix system has more inputs than the later Mopar system and, in some ways, is more complex. Its knock sensor automatically tunes the spark advance curve to an optimum mix for each cylinder. Some Renix-controlled engines will get better fuel economy by using higher octane fuel. The system on the AMC 4.0 L I6 engine is flexible allowing the use of a modified camshafts and modifications to the cylinder heads without significantly changing the base computer.

The Renix computer was first used in 1986 AMC 2.5 L four-cylinder engines. The system improved the drivability of the Jeep Cherokee and Comanche over carbureted models. The power increase was also noticeable. The Renix system was used through the 1990 model year. However, it is handicapped because few scan tools can be "plugged in" to this on-board diagnostics computer. The Renix control system before 1991 can be tested only with Chrysler's DRB tester, and the diagnostic test modes for 1989 and later engines with SBEC controllers differ from those provided for 1988 and earlier models.

Model years:
- 1986 - Renix TBI became standard on Jeep 2.5 L AMC four-cylinder engines
- 1987 - introduction of the new Renix controlled 4.0 L six-cylinder engine was rated at 173 hp (129 kW; 175 PS) and 220 lb⋅ft (298 N⋅m) of torque
- 1988 - the Renix controlled 4.0 L engine output increased to 177 hp (132 kW; 179 PS) and 224 lb⋅ft (304 N⋅m) of torque, due to higher compression ratio
- 1989 - Changed to Renix MPFI
- 1991 - Chrysler Corporation replaced the Renix control system with OBD-I-compliant control electronics, the Chrysler HO EFI.

The Renix control system was exclusive on the 1986 through 1990 Jeep Cherokee and Comanche with AMC-designed engines. The control setup used with the 2.8 L (171 cu in) V6 was OBD-I General Motors. The early 2.1 L (128 cu in) Renault turbodiesel I4 used its specific control setup.

The Jeep Wrangler (YJ) did not get the AMC 4.0 L I6 engine until 1991, when Chrysler-designed electronics accompanied it. Until then, it retained the AMC 258 cu in (4.2 L) engine with a carburetor. No other Jeep vehicle was equipped with Renix electronic controls.

=== Operation ===
In a typical Jeep application, the ignition control module (ICM) is in the engine compartment. It consists of a solid-state ignition circuit and an integrated ignition coil that can be removed and serviced separately. Electronic signals from the ECU to the ICM determine the amount of ignition timing or retard needed to meet engine power requirements. The ECU provides an input signal to the ICM. The ICM has outputs for a tach signal to the tachometer and a high voltage signal from the coil to the distributor. The crankshaft position sensor senses TDC (Top Dead Center) and BDC crankshaft positions, as well as engine rpm. This sensor is secured by special shouldered bolts to the flywheel/drive plate housing and is not adjustable.

=== Inspection stations ===
The Renix control system is "pre-OBD" and, therefore, does not have a "Check Engine Lamp". It also does not "store" or "throw" Diagnostic Trouble Codes (DTCs) or "Parameter IDs" (PIDs). "The Jeep 4.0 liter PowerTech Straight-Six Engine". allpar.com. This is a common problem at vehicle inspection, particularly in California and other jurisdictions with emission standards. Most inspection stations are unaware and will try to explain that the CEL/MIL "does not work".

== Skoda applications ==
In the 1980s, Skoda manufactured a few rear-engined cars with Renix fuel injection. These were originally destined for Canada, but ended up in Europe. These are usually known as 135 GLi or 135 RiC. Fuel system parts may be available from Chrysler-Jeep dealers.

== Volvo applications ==
The Volvo 700 Series and some of the Volvo 300 Series used a B200K 2.0 L inline-4 naturally aspirated engine with Renix ignition and some 300 series Volvos with Renault powerplants. The 300 Volvo series is unknown in the U.S. market. It was manufactured in the Netherlands (with a limited production of cars in Malaysia through the CKD process).

All 300 series Volvo cars with gasoline engines came with Renix/Bendix ignition from 1983 until 1991, when production of the 300 series stopped.

Volvo "Redblock" engines equipped with Renix ignition:

- B200K 1986 cc 100–101 hp (75–75 kW) Solex Cisac Z34 twin barrel carburetor 1985–1989
- B200E 1986 cc 111–115 hp (83–86 kW) Bosch LE-jetronic injected unit 1985–1989
- B200F 1986 cc 108 hp (81 kW; 109 PS) Bosch LU-jetronic injected and catalyzed engine 1987–1990
- B230K

Renault-derived units with Renix ignition:

- B18E(D) 1721 cc OHC engines in 400 series 1986–1988
- B172K 1721 cc OHC 78–81 hp (58–60 kW) Solex Cisaz Z32 twin barrel carburetor 1986–1989
- B14.4E/S 1397 cc OHV 72 hp (54 kW; 73 PS) Weber 32DIR twin barrel carburetor 1985–1991
- B14.3E/S 1397 cc OHV 64 hp (48 kW; 65 PS) single barrel Solex carburetor version 1983–1985
- B13.4E 1289 cc OHV 64 hp (48 kW; 65 PS) Weber 32DIR twin-barrel carburetor unit aimed for the Finnish market (where 1.3 L was a tax-class) 1989–1991

B172K and B18 were based on the Renault FnN (n being 1, 2, or 3) engines from Renault, and B14.x was based on the Renault C1J; both types were modified for Volvo to varying extents.

== See also ==
- AMC Straight-6 engine
- AMC Engines
- List of Chrysler engines
