= Chrysler PowerTech engine (disambiguation) =

Chrysler has used the PowerTech name on the following engines:

- The 2.4 L Chrysler Neon engine I4 engine
- The 2.5 L AMC straight-4 engine I4 engine
- The 3.7 L Chrysler PowerTech engine V6 engine
- The 4.0 L AMC Straight 6 engine I6 engine
- The 4.7 L Chrysler PowerTech engine V8 engine
