= AMC straight-6 engine =

Series of I6 engines built by American Motors and Chrysler

AMC Straight-6 engine
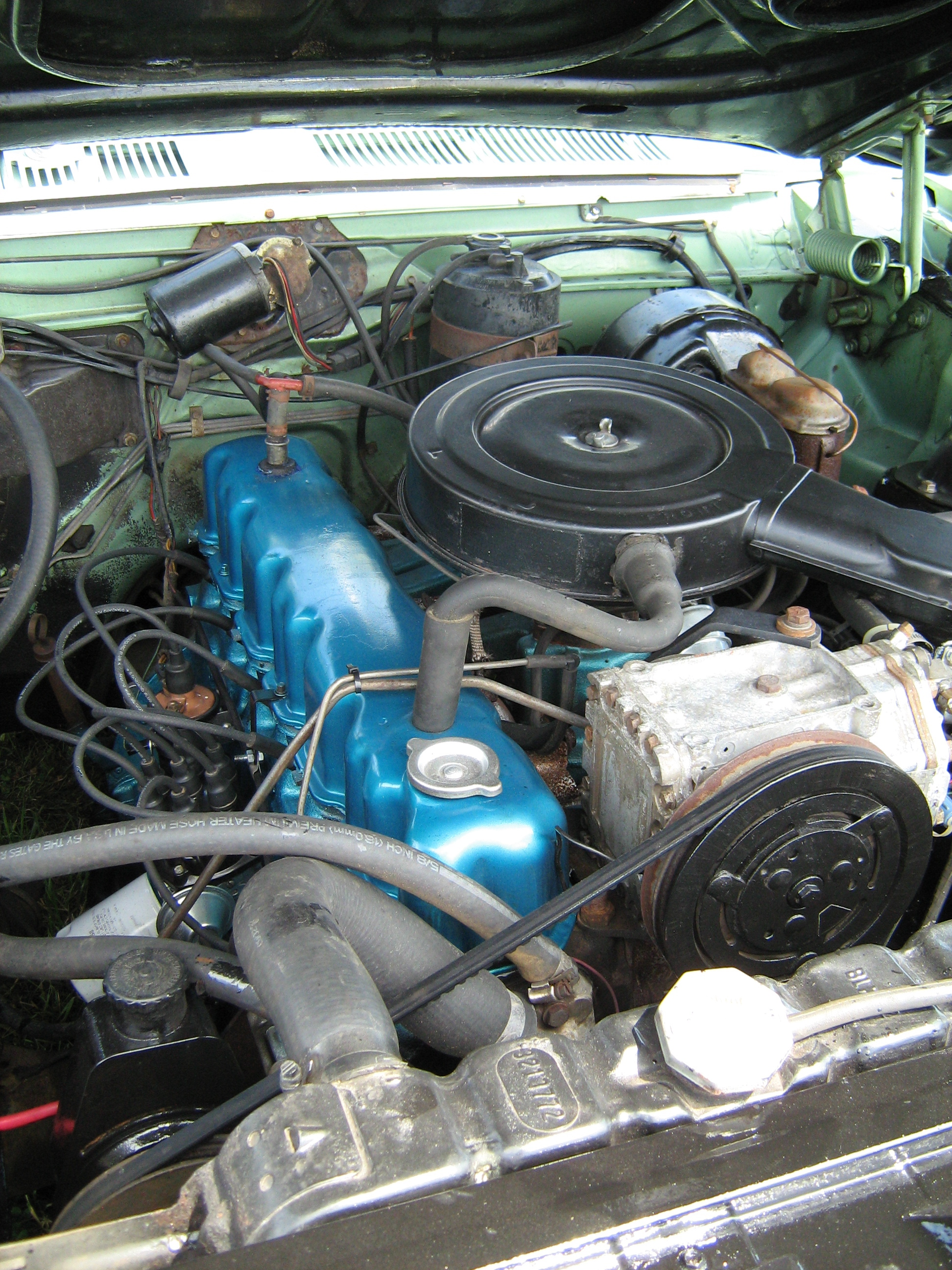

Overview
- Manufacturer: American Motors Corporation (1964–1987); Chrysler Corporation (1987–2006)
- Production: 1964–2006

Layout
- Configuration: Naturally aspirated Straight-6
- Displacement: 199 cu in (3.3 L); 232 cu in (3.8 L); 242 cu in (4.0 L); 252 cu in (4.1 L); 258 cu in (4.2 L); 282 cu in (4.6 L)
- Cylinder bore: 3.75 in (95.3 mm); 3.875 in (98.4 mm); 3.91 in (99.3 mm); 3.917 in (99.5 mm)
- Piston stroke: 3 in (76.2 mm); 3.414 in (86.7 mm); 3.4375 in (87.3 mm); 3.5 in (88.9 mm); 3.895 in (98.9 mm)
- Cylinder block material: Cast-iron
- Cylinder head material: Cast-iron
- Valvetrain: OHV 2 valves x cyl.
- Compression ratio: 7.7:1, 8.0:1, 8.5:1, 9.5:1

Combustion
- Fuel system: Carburetor; Multi-port fuel injection
- Management: AMC CEC; Renix or Mopar (manufactured by Siemens)
- Fuel type: Gasoline
- Cooling system: Water-cooled

Output
- Power output: 128–200 hp (95–149 kW; 130–203 PS)
- Torque output: 182–280 lb⋅ft (247–380 N⋅m)

Dimensions
- Dry weight: 483 lb (219 kg) (4.0 L engine)

The AMC straight-6 engine is a family of straight-six engines produced by American Motors Corporation (AMC) and used in passenger cars and Jeep vehicles from 1964 through 2006. Production continued after Chrysler acquired AMC in 1987.

American Motors continued to use the Rambler straight-six engine initially designed by Nash Motors. It was redesigned as an OHV for the 1956 model year. This engine was discontinued in 1965.

American Motors introduced a completely new I6 design in 1964. This engine evolved in several displacements and underwent upgrades. Vehículos Automotores Mexicanos (VAM) also manufactured this family of six-cylinder engines, including two versions available only in Mexico.

A new 4.0 L engine was introduced by AMC in 1986 for the 1987 model year Jeep Cherokee (XJ) and became the final version of AMC's inline sixes. It is regarded as one of the best 4x4 and off-road engines. This engine was produced by Chrysler through 2006.

Among "classic American engines, the AMC straight-six stands as a testament to smart engineering and enduring performance".

== Predecessors ==
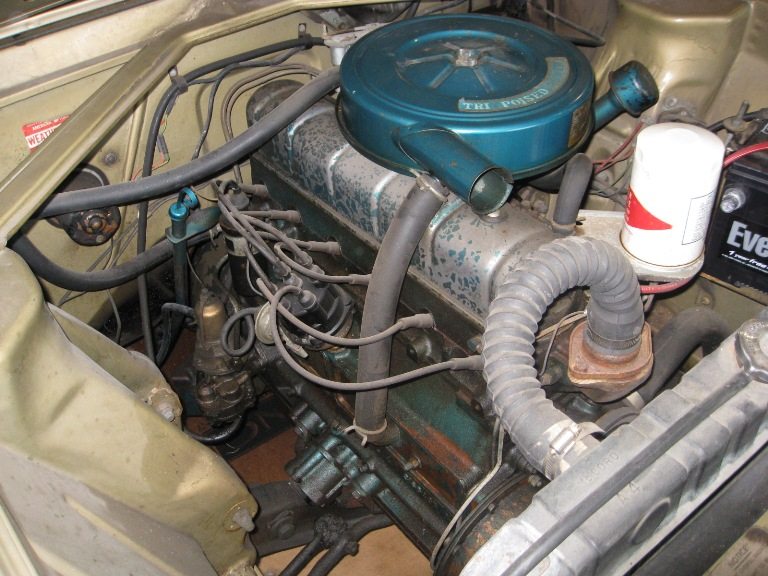
A 1964 Rambler American with a 195.6 OHV engine

The straight-six engine lineage at AMC goes back to Nash Motors. An economy-focused engine debuted in the 1941 Nash Ambassador 600 model. Its initial displacement of 172.6 cu in (2.8 L) was subsequently increased to 184 cu in (3.0 L) and finally to 195.6 cu in (3.2 L) in 1952.

After Nash merged with Hudson to form AMC in 1954, efforts continued to enhance performance and meet evolving market demands. The engine's architecture underwent a significant transformation for the 1956 model year, transitioning from a flathead (L-head) side-valve configuration to an overhead valve (OHV) design. This modernization aimed to improve engine efficiency and power output. The flathead version was reintroduced in 1958, serving as the base economy engine for the newly launched Rambler American compact car. This dual-engine strategy persisted until 1965, catering to performance-oriented and economy-minded consumers.

To reduce vehicle weight and enhance fuel efficiency, AMC introduced a die-cast aluminum block version of the OHV 195.6 cu in (3.2 L) engine in 1961. This innovative approach resulted in a significant weight reduction, with the aluminum engine weighing 380 lb (170 kg), compared to its cast-iron counterpart's 460 lb (210 kg). This aluminum engine was produced through 1964, showcasing AMC's engineering prowess and willingness to experiment with advanced materials.

While not known for high performance, this engine was known for reliability. This engine was also used in marine applications.

== Modern Era ==
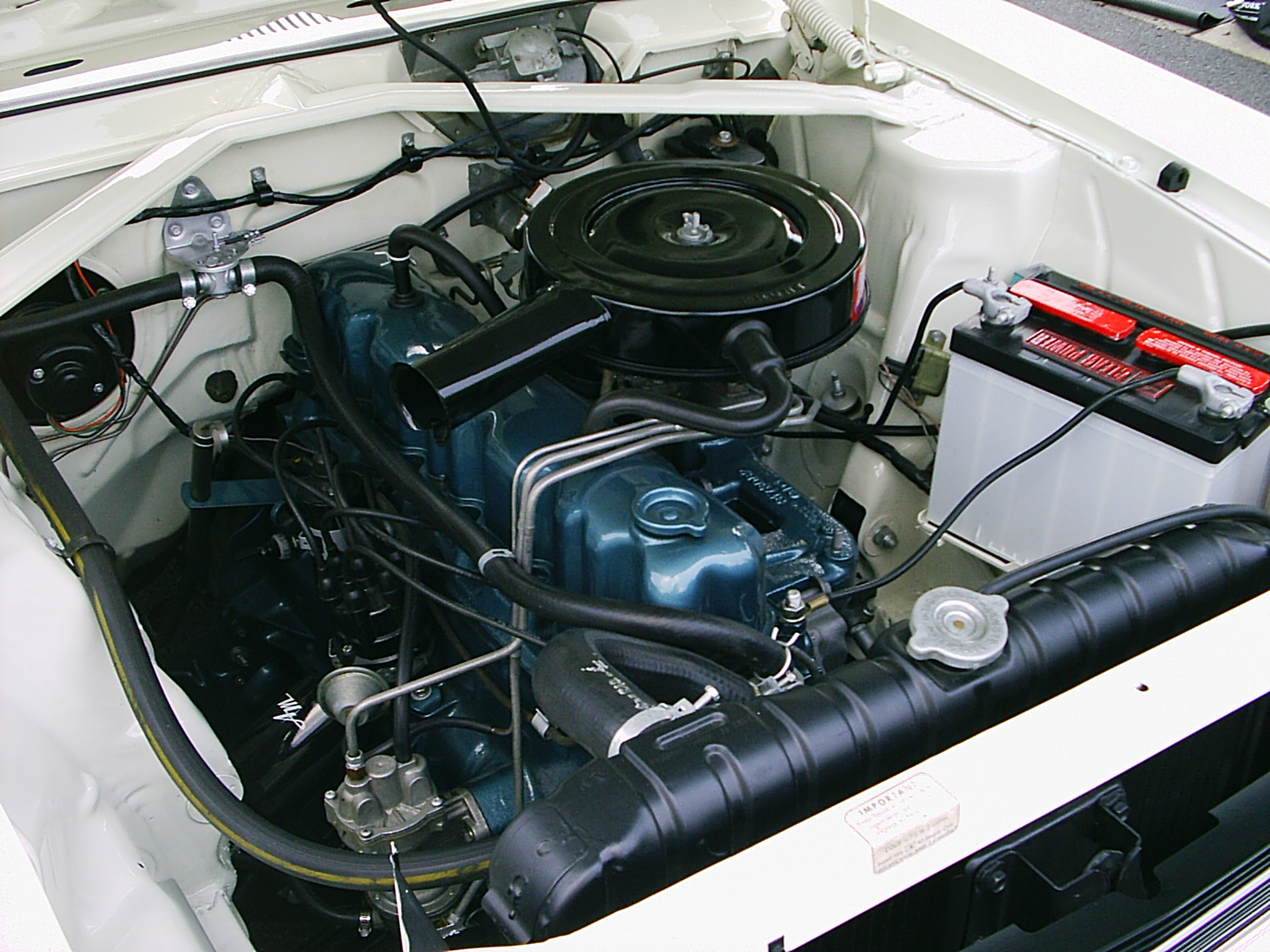
Engine bay of a 1968 Rambler American

American Motors introduced a groundbreaking inline-six engine in 1964. It featured a short-stroke design and a robust seven-main bearing crankshaft with an overall design to provide good torque at low RPMs. This engine enjoyed a remarkable production run that continued under AMC and Vehículos Automotores Mexicanos (VAM) as well as by Chrysler until 2006.

Initially marketed as the "Torque Command" engine, the 232 cu in (3.8 L) inline-six represented AMC's first genuinely modern six-cylinder engine. Road tests conducted by Consumer Reports lauded the engine as "a very smooth and quiet engine, which should give good performance."

To commemorate the engine's launch in May 1964, AMC produced 2,520 special "Typhoon" editions based on the Rambler Classic two-door hardtop. These distinctive vehicles featured the 145 hp (108 kW; 147 PS) 8.5:1 compression ratio engine, a striking Solar Yellow exterior with a Classic Black roof, and "Typhoon" badging in place of the standard "Classic" script. Notably, all other Rambler Classic options, except alternative engine choices, were available on the Typhoon edition.

For the 1965 model year, the 232 engine superseded the aging Nash 195.6 cu in (3.2 L) OHV inline-six in the Classic and Ambassador models. This marked the return of a six-cylinder engine in the Ambassador line since 1956, reflecting AMC's commitment to offering a wider range of powertrain options.

In 1966, AMC expanded its six-cylinder lineup by introducing the 199 cu in (3.3 L) version of the 232 engine. This smaller variant replaced the OHV and L-head 195.6 cu in (3.2 L) engines across AMC's passenger car lineup.

Both the 199 and 232 engines shared a 3.75 in (95.3 mm) bore, differing only in stroke: 3 in (76.2 mm) for the 199 and 3.5 in (88.9 mm) for the 232. The 199 engine was discontinued in 1970, while the 232 continued production alongside the larger 258 cu in (4.2 L) engine, which the increase in displacement was achieved by employing a 3.895 in (98.9 mm) stroke crankshaft and a slightly taller engine block.

More stringent emission control regulations, coupled with the growing weight of vehicles due to safety mandates, led to a gradual decline in engine power output, ultimately resulting in the discontinuation of the 232 in 1979.

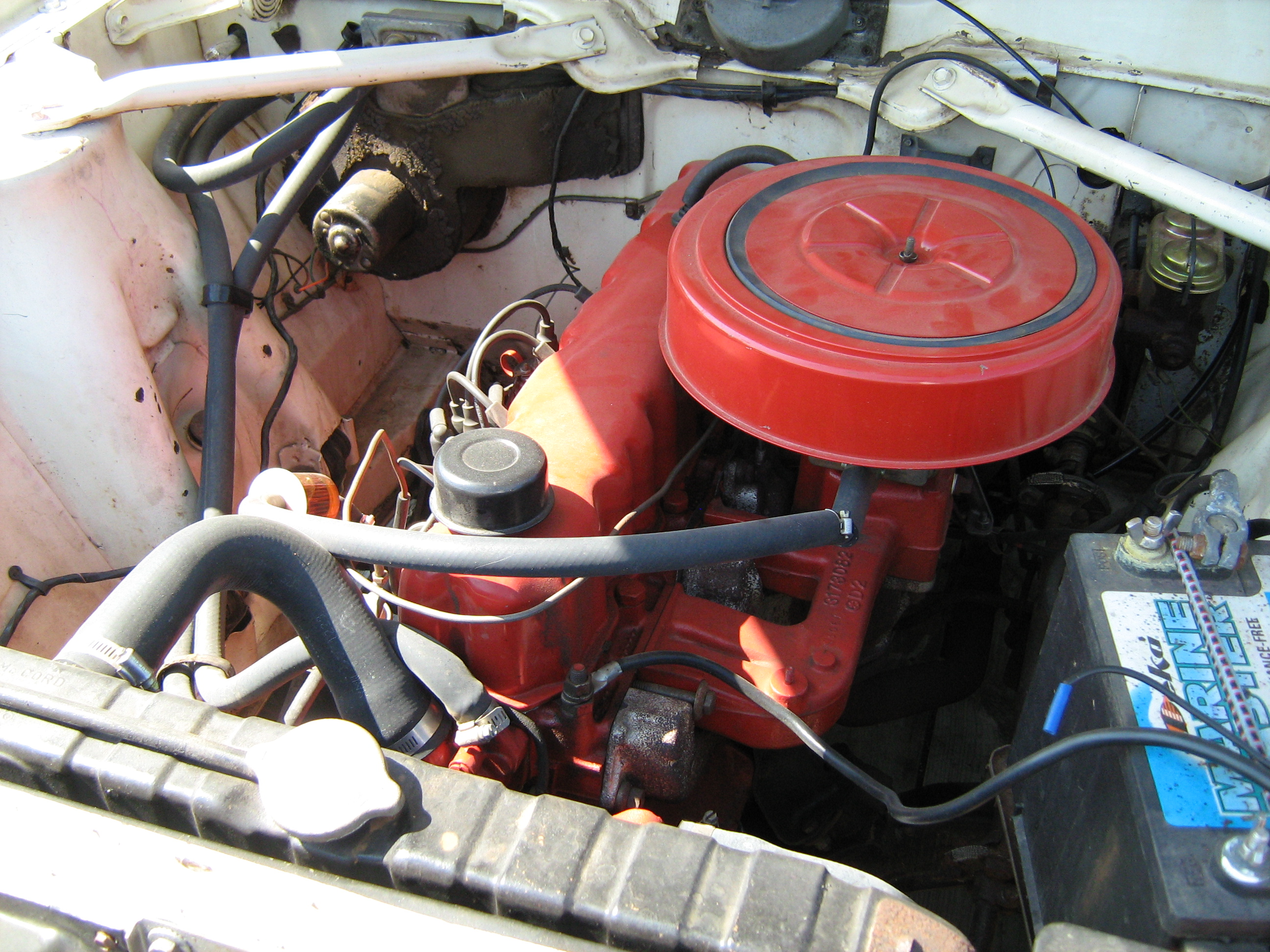
Standard 232 in a 1966 Rambler Classic

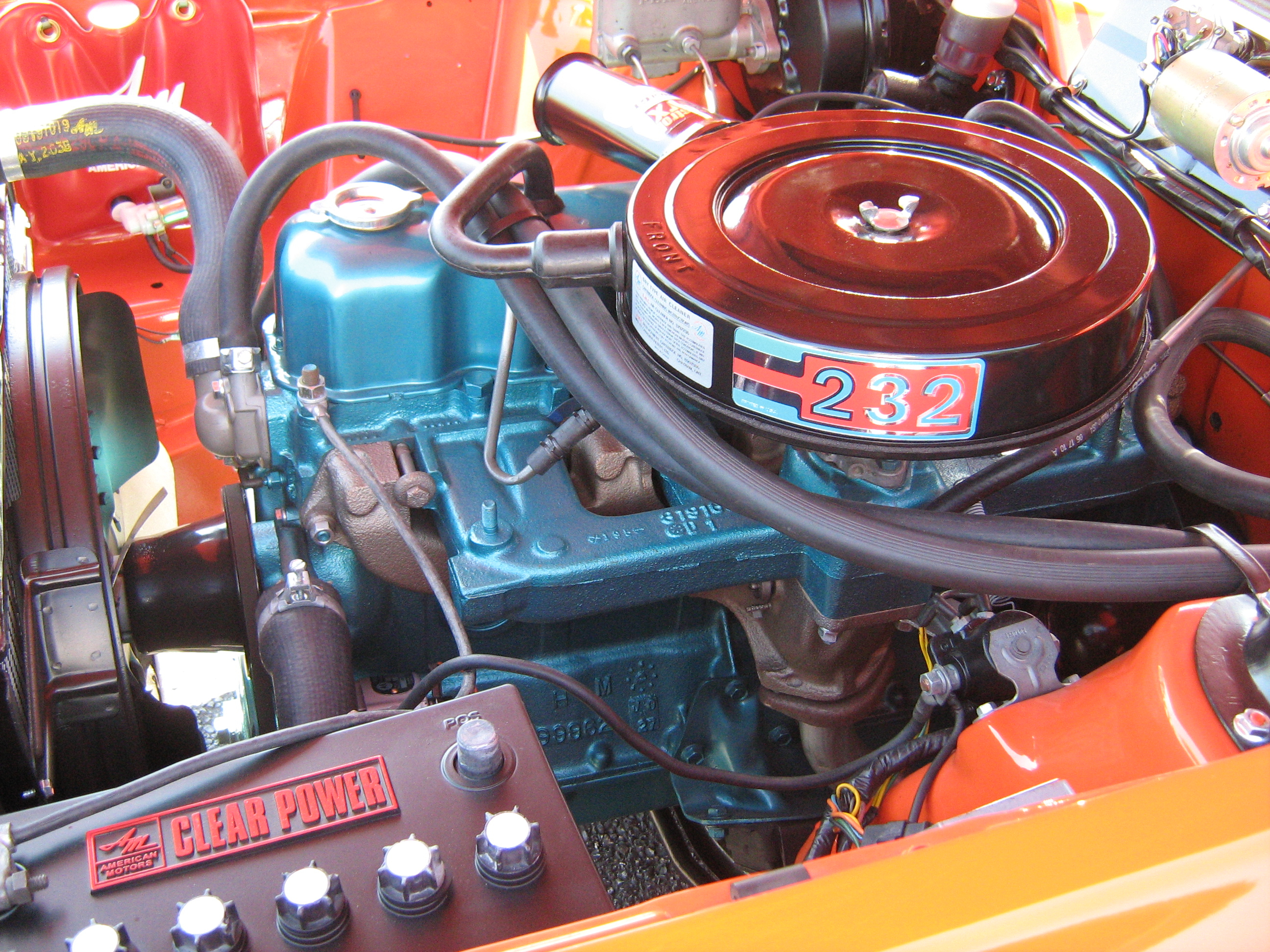
Engine bay of 1971 AMI Rambler Gremlin

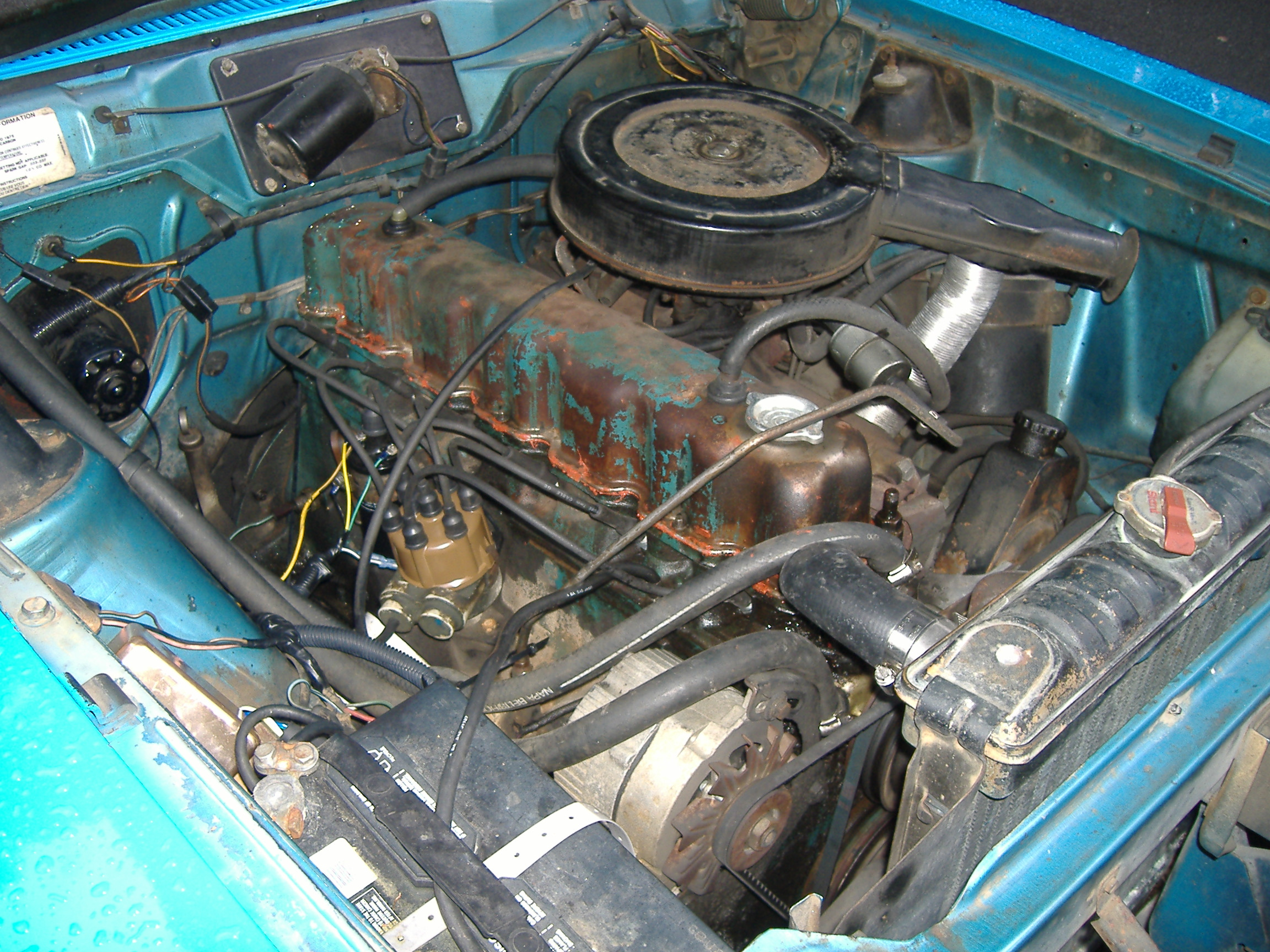
Engine bay of a 1975 AMC Hornet with a 232

=== 199 ===
The 199 cu in (3.3 L) engine was produced from 1965 through 1970. Rated at 128 hp (95 kW; 130 PS) at 4400 rpm and 182 lb⋅ft (247 N⋅m) of torque at 1600 rpm, it was the standard engine beginning with the compact 1966 Rambler American series.

==== Navarro Indy ====
Barney Navarro selected the 199 AMC engine to power a race car for the Indianapolis 500. Navarro had previously applied turbocharging to a variety of engines that led to the 199 engine's Indy-related application "based on a Stone-Age-strong Nash 6."

This engine had not been used in an IndyCar. However, Navarro selected it "due both to its strong bottom end and thick cylinder walls." For the first Indy attempt, Navarro designed a fuel-injection system, a unique head, and a single turbo to achieve 550 hp (410 kW; 558 PS) at 6000 rpm. This was with the stock block featuring seven main bearings and large journal sizes, while the second block was drilled for four-bolt caps. Successive engines incorporated double turbochargers to produce 640–700 hp (477–522 kW; 649–710 PS).

Navarro fielded a 1964 Watson car with the AMC 199 engine for three years at the Indianapolis 500. However, the #50 Navarro-Rambler never qualified due to problems with drivers and with the suspension of the cars. The car was also entered at the 1971 IndyCar "Rafaela 300" season opener in Argentina. This was the car's fourth actual race start, and it began at 19 on the starting grid. Dave Strickland drove it for 45 laps. This car was then driven by Les Scott in practice for the 1971 Indy 500 race. The following year, another attempt to qualify was with Leon Sirois as the driver.

An auction was held on 14 July 2005, to clear the remaining contents of the Navarro Engineering shop in Los Angeles. A private collector purchased a complete Navarro 700 hp (522 kW; 710 PS) 199 cu in (3.3 L) engine for $15,000.

Applications:
- Rambler Classic (1965–1966, fleet cars only)
- Rambler American/AMC Rambler (1965–1969)
- AMC Hornet (1970)
- AMC Gremlin (1970)
- VAM Rambler American (mid 1965–1969) U.S. equivalent — AMC Rambler American and AMC Rambler sedans
- VAM Camioneta Rambler American (mid 1965–1967) U.S. equivalent — AMC Rambler American wagon

=== 232 ===
The 232 cu in (3.8 L) engine was produced from 1964 until 1979. The 232 was the base six-cylinder engine on many models through 1979, and even towards the end of its usage, it was considered reasonably modern in design.

After its midyear 1964 introduction in the "Typhoon" two-door hardtop as part of the mid-sized Rambler Classic line, the 232 engine was adapted to fit into the smaller 1965 Rambler American by using a special short water pump, an adaptive piece also used in the 1971 through 1975 Jeep CJ-5. Air conditioning was available only with the older 196 engine in the American models because there was not enough space for the compressor with the longer 232.

Through the 1970 model year, the 232 shared a deck height with the 199 cu in (3.3 L) engines. Starting in 1971, AMC raised the deck height to produce the 258, and the 232 adopted the 199's longer connecting rods and shared deck height with the 258. Bore and stroke remained the same.

In 1972, the bell housing bolt pattern changed to match the larger version used on the V8 engines.

Changes for the 1976 model year included fuel economy improvements that reduced emissions and warmup time. This was accomplished by reshaped carburetor air passages that pushed the fuel efficiency of a 232-equipped AMC Gremlin to 30 mpg_{‑US} (7.8 L/100 km; 36 mpg_{‑imp}) as tested by the United States Environmental Protection Agency, compared to 24 mpg_{‑US} (9.8 L/100 km; 29 mpg_{‑imp}) in 1975.

Applications:
- Rambler Classic (1964–1966)
- Rambler American/AMC Rambler (1964–1969)
- Rambler/AMC Marlin (1965–1967)
- Rambler/AMC Ambassador (1965–1970)
- Rambler/AMC Rebel (1967–1970)
- AMC Javelin (1968–1974)
- AMC Hornet (1970–1977)
- AMC Gremlin (1970–1978)
- AMC Matador (1971–1974)
- AMC Pacer (1975–1979)
- AMC Concord (1978–1979)
- AMC Spirit (1979)
- Jeep CJ (1972–1979)
- Jeep Cherokee (1974–1979)
- Jeep Wagoneer (1965–1971)
- Jeep J-Series (1965–1970)
- Jeep Commando (1972–1973) (1976 in Spain)
- International Scout (1969–1971)
- International Light Line pickups/Travelall (1968–1971)
- VAM Rambler American Hardtop (1965) U.S. equivalent AMC Rambler American 440H hardtop
- VAM Rambler American Rally (1969–1971) U.S. equivalent 1969 AMC Rambler Rogue sedan instead of hardtop and 1970–1971 Hornet X
- VAM Rambler American (1968–1972) U.S. equivalent AMC Rambler American sedans and AMC Hornet sedans
- VAM Camioneta Rambler American (1968–1972) U.S. equivalent AMC Rambler American wagon and AMC Hornet Sportabout
- VAM Rambler Classic 660 (1965) U.S. equivalent AMC Rambler Classic
- VAM Rambler Classic 770 (1966–1969) U.S. equivalent 1966 AMC Rambler Classic sedans plus AMC Rebel four door sedan
- VAM Rambler Classic SST (1967–1969) U.S. equivalent AMC Rebel hardtop
- VAM Javelin (1968–1969) U.S. equivalent AMC Javelin
- VAM Gremlin (1974–1976) U.S. equivalent AMC Gremlin

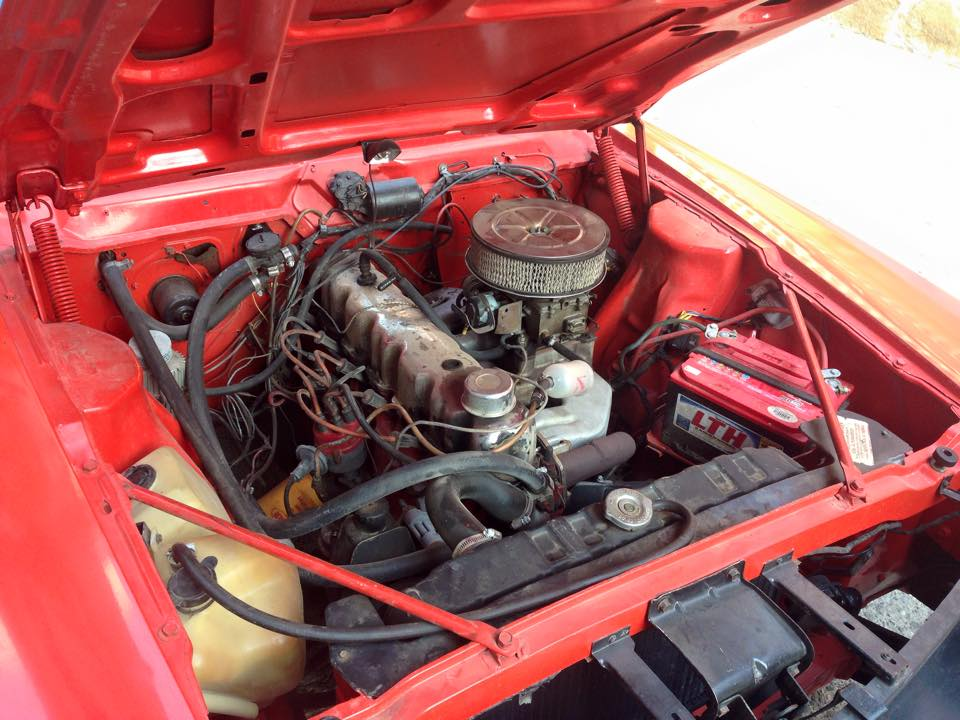
A VAM 252 engine in a Mexican Javelin

=== 252 ===
The 252 cu in (4.1 L) engine was produced by AMC's Mexican subsidiary Vehículos Automotores Mexicanos (VAM) beginning in 1969 and was dropped after 1972, replaced with AMC's 258 for the 1973 model year onward. This was similar to a 232 in stroke with a larger 3.91 in (99.3 mm) bore, for an actual displacement of 252.15 cu in (4.1 L). It was produced in VAM's Lerma, Estado de México engine plant.

Output for 1972 Rambler American Rally model (gross):

- Horsepower 170 hp (127 kW; 172 PS) at 4600 rpm
- Torque 240 lb⋅ft (325 N⋅m) at 2300 rpm

Engine dimensions:

- Compression ratio 9.5:1
- Intake valve diameter 2.02 in (51 mm)
- Exhaust valve diameter 1.6755 in (42.56 mm)
- Connecting Rod length 5.875 in (149.2 mm)
- Deck height 9.424 in (239.4 mm)
- Bore 3.91 in (99.3 mm)
- Stroke 3 1/2 in (88.9 mm)
Applications:
- VAM Javelin (1969–1970) U.S. equivalent — AMC Javelin
- VAM Rambler Classic SST (1969–1971) U.S. equivalent — AMC Rebel hardtop and AMC Matador hardtop
- VAM Rambler Classic 770 (1970) U.S. equivalent — AMC Rebel sedan
- VAM Rambler Classic DPL (1971) U.S. equivalent — AMC Matador sedan
- VAM Rambler American Rally (1972) U.S. equivalent — AMC Hornet Rallye X

=== 258 ===
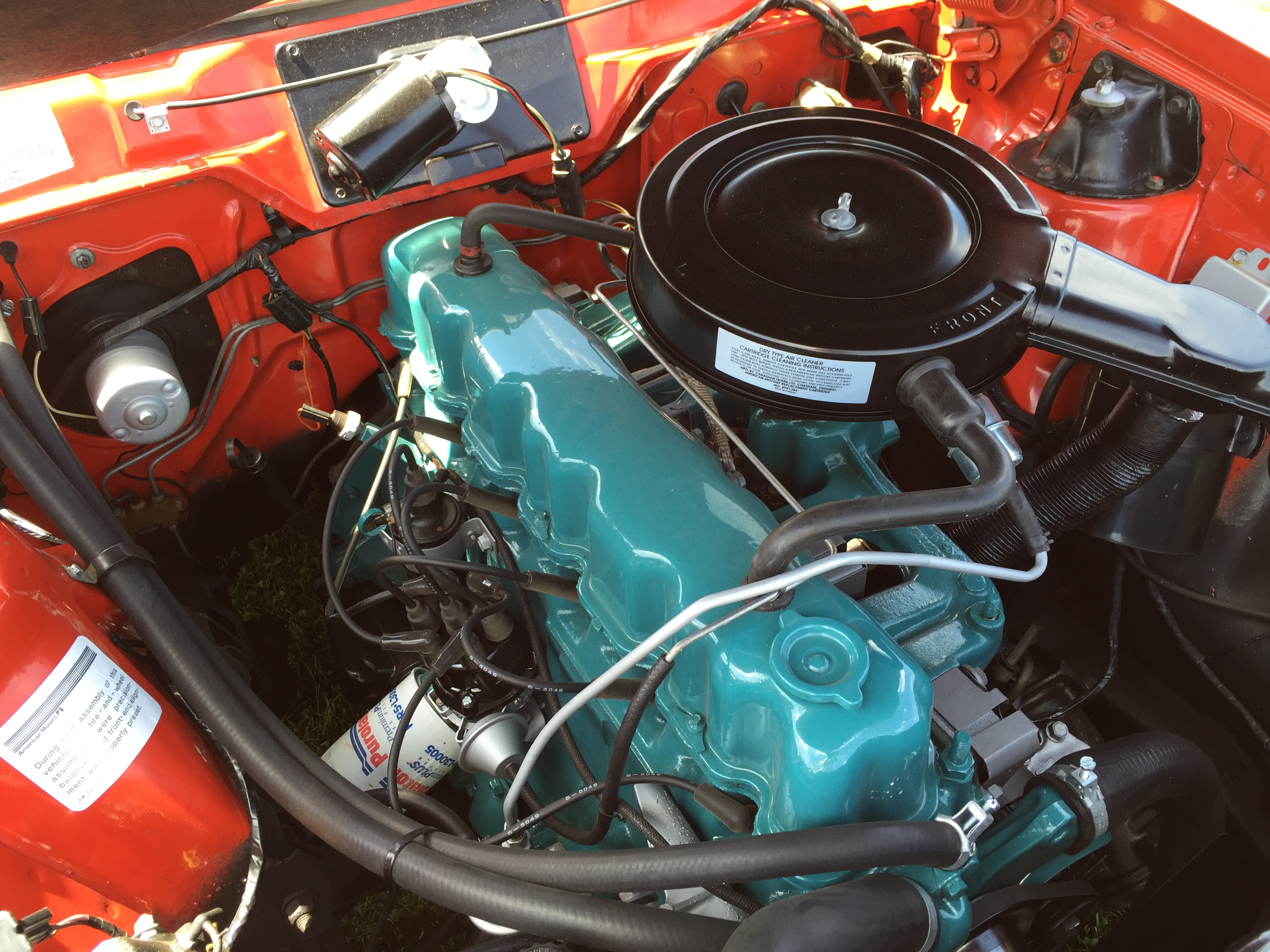
258 engine in a 1974 AMC Gremlin

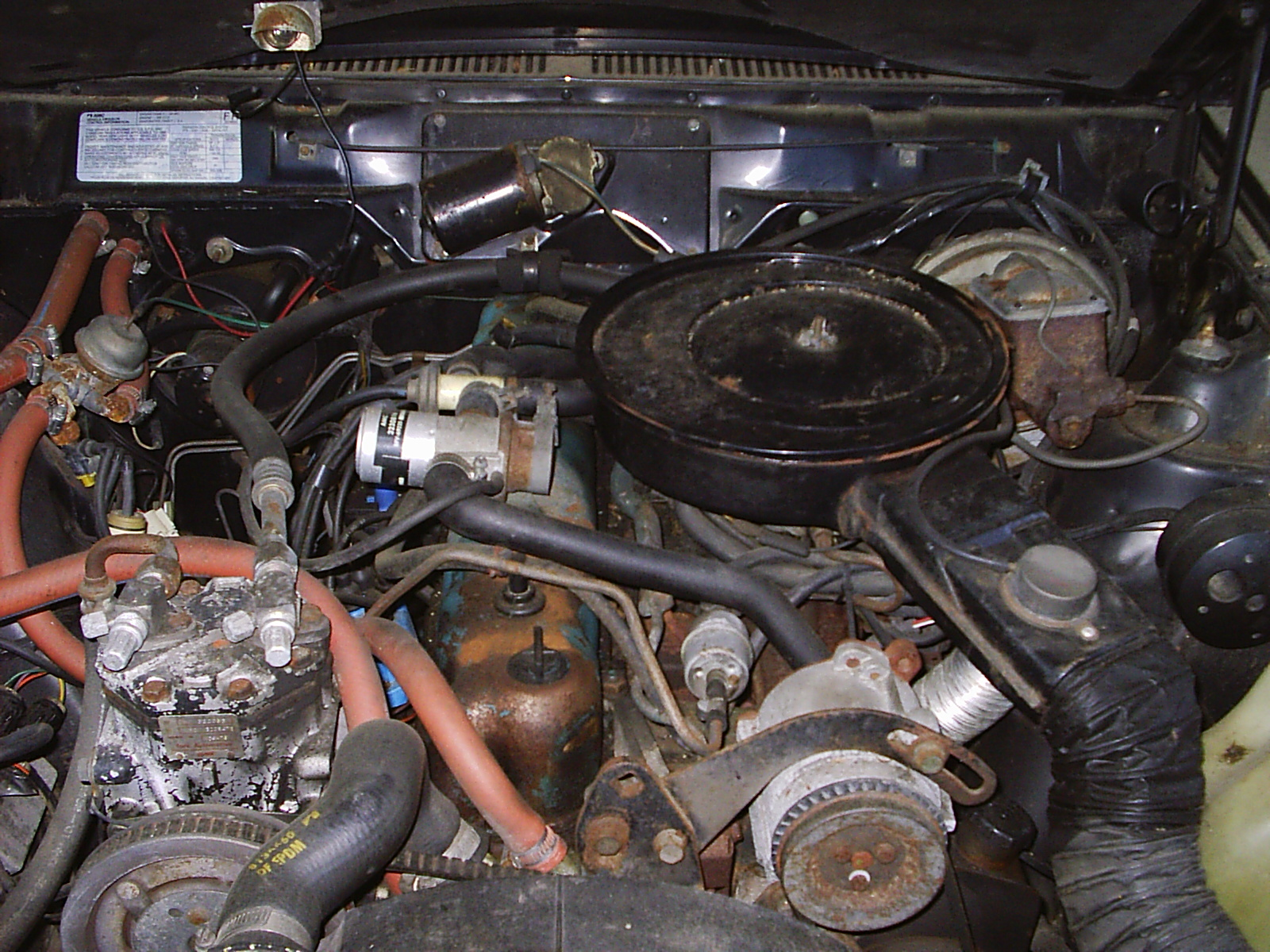
Engine bay of a 1980 AMC Spirit AMX with 258 and emissions controls

The 258 cu in (4.2 L) was produced from 1971 through 1990. It featured an undersquare 3.75 in (95.3 mm) bore and 3.895 in (98.9 mm) stroke; it was otherwise similar to the 199 and 232 (Note: Starting in the mid-1970s the 258's bore and stroke was changed to a 3.82 in (97 mm) bore over a 3.75" stroke. This allowed one block to be used for both the 232 and 258 and the same crankshaft blank could be milled to the two different strokes).

This engine is considered reliable, inexpensive, and torquey. Later 258 models (starting with the 1980 model year for California AMC Concords and Spirits, 1981 for California Jeeps, California Eagles, and 49-state Concord and Spirits, as well as in 1982 for 49-state Eagles and all other applications) are equipped with AMC Computerized Engine Control (CEC) system. For 1981, as part of a weight reduction program (aluminum intake manifold, plastic rocker arm cover), the crankshaft was changed from a twelve counterweight design to four, saving approximately 20 pounds (9.1 kg).

This engine also found use in farm/industrial applications such as the International Harvester 4000 swather.

Applications:
- AMC Hornet/Concord/Eagle (1971–1988)
- AMC Pacer (1975–1980)
- AMC Matador (1971–1978)
- AMC Gremlin and Spirit (1971–1983)
- International Scout and Light Line trucks (1972–1980)
- Jeep CJ (1972–1986)
- Jeep Cherokee and Wagoneer (1972–1986)
- Jeep J-Series (1971–1988)
- Jeep Wrangler (1987–1990)
- Jeep Commando (1972–1973)
- VAM Rambler American (1973–1974) U.S. equivalent — AMC Hornet sedans
- VAM Rambler American Rally (1973–1974) U.S. equivalent — AMC Hornet X sedan instead of a hatchback
- VAM Camioneta Rambler American (1973–1974) U.S. equivalent — AMC Hornet Sportabout
- VAM American (1975–1983) U.S. equivalent — AMC Hornet sedan base model and AMC Concord sedan base model
- VAM American Rally (1975) U.S. equivalent — AMC Hornet X sedan instead of a hatchback
- VAM Camioneta American (1975–1983) U.S. equivalent — AMC Hornet Sportabout and Concord base model wagon
- VAM American ECD (1975–1979) U.S. equivalent — AMC Hornet DL two and four-door sedans and AMC Concord DL/Limited four-door sedan
- VAM Gremlin X (1976–1982) U.S. equivalent — AMC Gremlin X and AMC Spirit sedan X model equivalent
- VAM Gremlin (1977–1983) U.S. equivalent — AMC Gremlin and AMC Spirit sedan base model

=== 282 ===
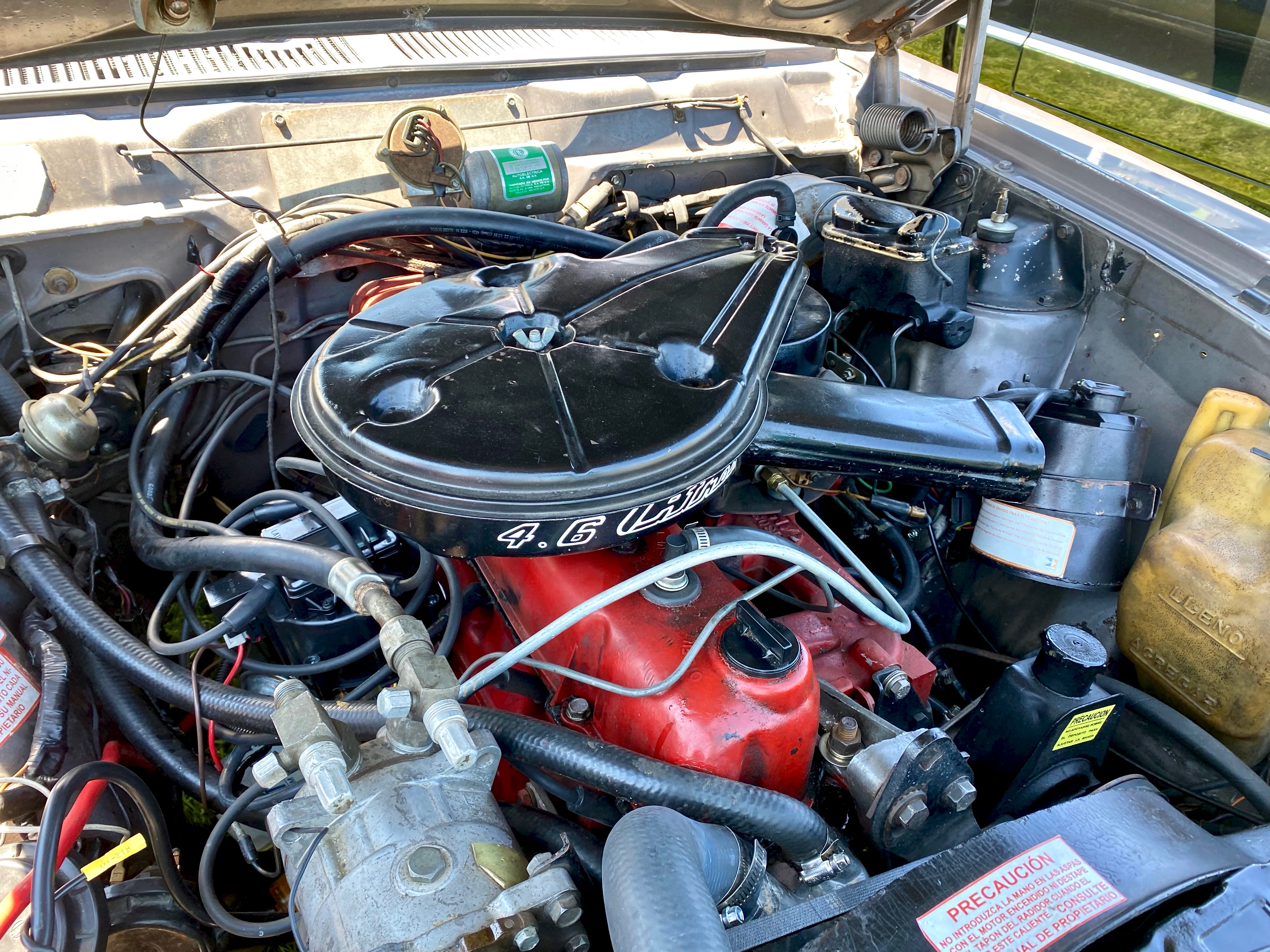
VAM 4.6 L engine

The 282 cu in (4.6 L) engine was produced by AMC's Mexican subsidiary Vehículos Automotores Mexicanos (VAM) beginning in 1971 through 1986. This was similar to a 258 in stroke, cast with a larger 3.917 in (99.5 mm) bore, 0.16 in (4.1 mm) larger than the 258, making 281.7 cu in (4.6 L). All VAM 282s from 1971 through 1978 were still advertised with an output measured using the gross rating system that was last used under AMC in 1971. The 1979 through 1983 engines were measured under the new net rating system. All units were produced in VAM's engine plant located in Lerma, Estado de México.

A high-performance version was developed by VAM, derived from the racing team engine. The modifications consisted of headers, 302 degree camshaft, semi-ported cylinder heads, modified electronic distributor, aluminium intake manifold, a Holley 2300 350CFM carburettor, reinforced harmonic damper, and a heavy duty cooling system (larger capacity radiator and fan clutch). These increased power from 132 hp (98 kW; 134 PS) and 216 lb⋅ft (293 N⋅m) torque to 172 hp (128 kW; 174 PS) and 225 lb⋅ft (305 N⋅m) torque.

The 282, which had a larger bore, is considered the ancestor of the L stroker engine, where it is common for the engine rebuilder to use an AMC 258 crankshaft in a Jeep 4.0 cylinder block – a 4.5 uses the stock AMC 258 connecting rods (with stock or .020 overbore using aftermarket pistons). In contrast, the 4.6, 4.7, and 5.0 strokers use the 258 cranks, but retain the 4.0 connecting rods.

Output for 1971–1973 models (gross):

- Horsepower 200 hp (149 kW; 203 PS) at 4400 rpm
- Torque 280 lb⋅ft (380 N⋅m) at 2200 rpm
- Compression ratio 9.5:1

Output for 1974 models (gross):

- Horsepower 200 hp (149 kW; 203 PS) at 4400 rpm
- Torque 280 lb⋅ft (380 N⋅m) at 2200 rpm
- Compression ratio 8.5:1

Output for 1975–1976 models (gross):

- Horsepower 200 hp (149 kW; 203 PS) at 4400 rpm
- Torque 280 lb⋅ft (380 N⋅m) at 2200 rpm
- Compression ratio 7.7:1

Output for 1977–1978 models (gross):

- Horsepower 200 hp (149 kW; 203 PS) at 4400 rpm
- Torque 280 lb⋅ft (380 N⋅m) at 2200 rpm
- Compression ratio 8.0:1

Output for 1979–1981 Standard models (net):

- Horsepower 132 hp (98 kW; 134 PS) at 3800 rpm
- Torque 216 lb⋅ft (293 N⋅m) at 2200 rpm
- Compression ratio 8.0:1

Output for 1979 American 06/S and 1980–81 American and Rally GT models (net):

- Horsepower 172 hp (128 kW; 174 PS) at 4200 rpm
- Torque 225 lb⋅ft (305 N⋅m) at 2600 rpm
- Compression ratio 8.5:1

Output for 1982–1983 models (net):

- Horsepower 129 hp (96 kW; 131 PS) at 4000 rpm
- Torque 218 lb⋅ft (296 N⋅m) at 1800 rpm
- Compression ratio 8.5:1

Engine dimensions:

- Intake valve diameter 2.02 in (51 mm)
- Exhaust valve diameter 1.6755 in (42.56 mm)
- Connecting rod length 5.875 in (149.2 mm)
- Deck height 9.424 in (239.4 mm)
- Bore 3.917 in (99.5 mm)
- Stroke 3.895 in (98.9 mm)
Applications:
- VAM Javelin (1971–1973) U.S. equivalent — AMC Javelin
- VAM Classic DPL (1972–1976) U.S. equivalent — AMC Matador Sedan
- VAM Classic Brougham (1972, 1974–1976) U.S. equivalent — 1972 AMC Matador hardtop and AMC Matador Brougham coupe
- VAM Classic AMX (1974–1976) U.S. equivalent — AMC Matador X coupe
- VAM Pacer (1976–1979) U.S. equivalent — AMC Pacer coupe
- VAM Pacer X (1979) U.S. equivalent — AMC Pacer X coupe, high-performance limited edition, automatic transmission
- VAM American Rally (1976–1977) U.S. equivalent — AMC Hornet X sedan instead of hatchback
- VAM American Rally AMX (1978–1979) U.S. equivalent — AMC Concord AMX hatchback
- VAM American GFS (1977–1982) U.S. equivalent — AMC Hornet DL two-door sedan plus AMC Concord DL and Limited two-door sedans
- VAM Camioneta American Automática (1977–1978) U.S. equivalent — AMC Hornet DL wagon and AMC Concord DL wagon, both with automatic transmission
- VAM Camioneta American DL (1979–1983) U.S. equivalent — AMC Concord DL and Limited wagons
- VAM American 06/S (1979) U.S. equivalent AMC Concord two-door sedan, high-performance limited edition, manual transmission
- VAM American ECD (1980–1982) U.S. equivalent — AMC Concord DL and Limited four-door sedans
- VAM Rally AMX (1980–1983) U.S. equivalent — AMC Spirit GT coupe, standard version
- VAM Rally GT (1980–1981) U.S. equivalent — AMC Spirit GT coupe, high-performance limited edition, manual transmission
- VAM Rally SST (1981) U.S. equivalent — AMC Spirit Limited coupe
- VAM Lerma (1981–1982)
- VAM Jeep Wagoneer (1972–1983) U.S. equivalent — AMC Jeep Wagoneer
- Renault/VAM Jeep Grand Wagoneer from 1984 through 1986 (U.S. equivalent — Jeep Grand Wagoneer)

=== 4.0 ===
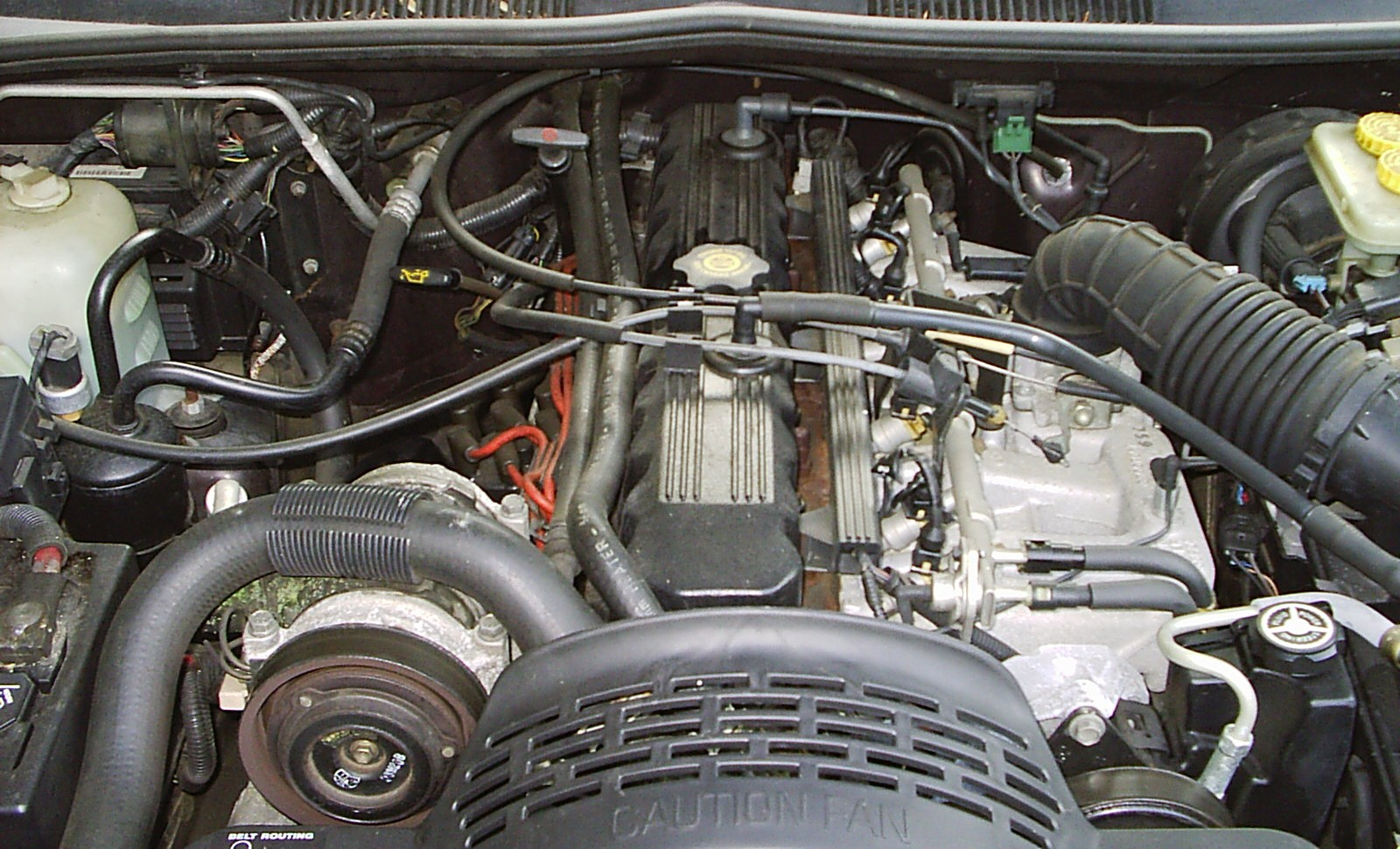
Engine bay of a 1993 Jeep Grand Cherokee with 4.0 L

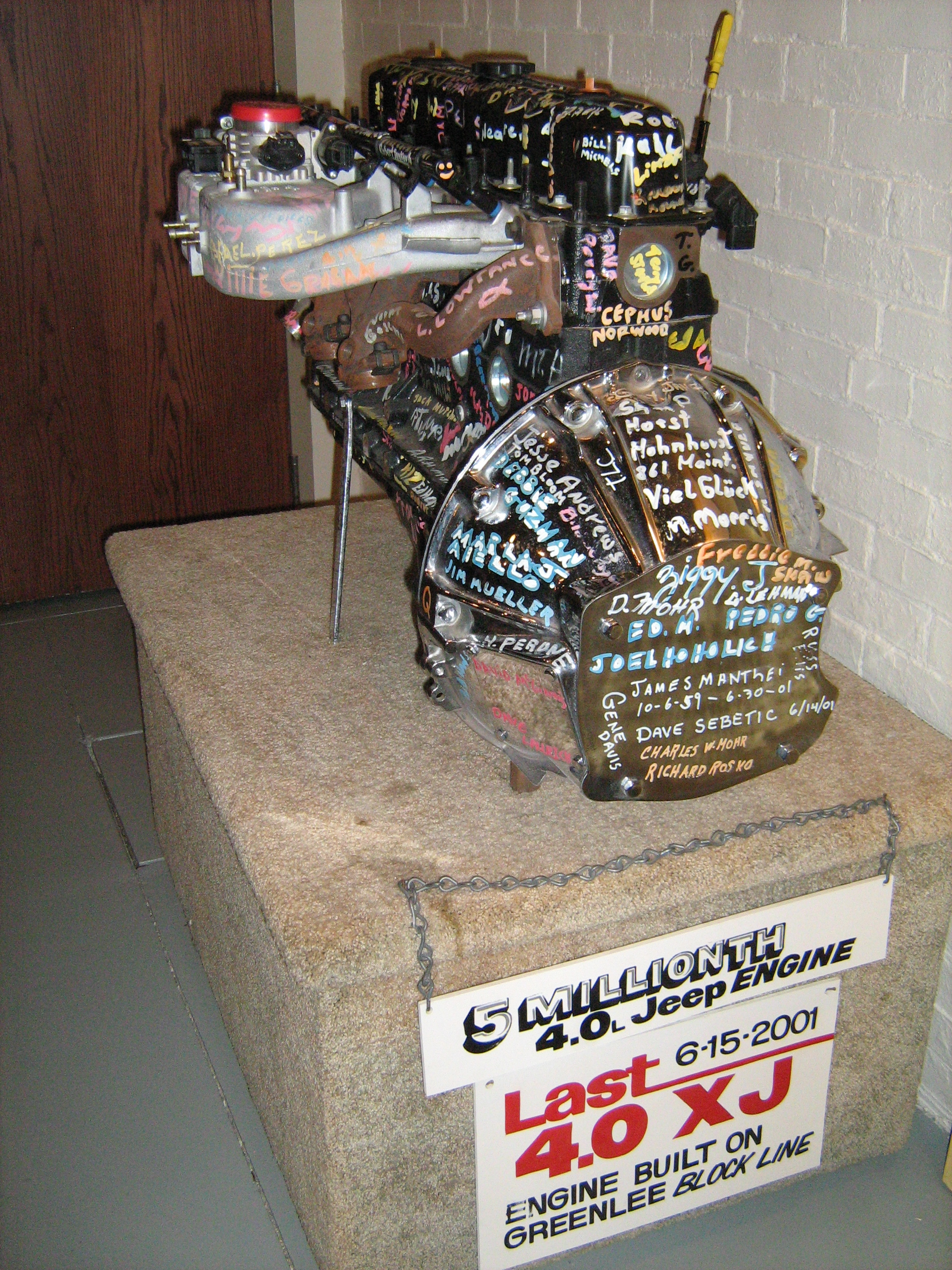
The 5 millionth Jeep 4.0 engine produced on the "Greenlee Block Line" dated June 15, 2001

American Motors began developing the 242 cu in (4.0 L) engine in 1984 and it was completed in just 26 months using many off-the-shelf components while featuring, among others, additional strength, improved combustion chamber, port setup, and cam profile. The total weight of the new engine was 483 pounds (219 kg), only one pound more than the 258 six despite its heavier-duty components and parts. The cast aluminum valve cover featured 15 bolts, the industry's most, to achieve a positive seal.

The new engine, which was introduced in 1986 for the 1987 model year, was a further evolution of AMC's 258 six. The new 4.0 L was not a re-bored version of the 4.2 as AMC engineers modified the 258's architecture. However, they incorporated elements from the 2.5 L four-cylinder engine introduced in 1984 which utilized the valvetrain of the 258 (minus cylinders two and five) and performance enhancements because of I4's new block, head, and crank. The new 4.0 L featured a 3.875 in (98.4 mm) bore and a 3.414 in (86.7 mm) stroke giving it a displacement of 241.6 cu in (4.0 L). Connecting rod length was 6.125 inches — similar to the discontinued 199 which was phased out in 1970.

The 4.0 L is one of AMC's best-known engines. It was one of four AMC engines kept in production when Chrysler bought AMC in 1987. Chrysler engineers continued to refine the engine to reduce noise, vibration, and harshness. The last in the line of the AMC inline sixes, the 4.0 L is regarded as one of the best Chrysler 4x4 off-road engines. A Motor Trend long-term test of a 1997 Cherokee XJ noted "this long-lived OHV powerplant has a reputation for getting people where they need to go" as well as "much love expressed by owners for the torquey 4.0-liter/190-horsepower inline six." The engine is known for longevity, and can sometimes go more than 300,000 miles (482,803 km) without rebuilding. The vibration dampener (harmonic balancer) usually gives out after 300,000 miles, where it is common for the rubber insulation to deteriorate where a service replacement is warranted. Described "as reliable as a block of wood" by Popular Mechanics and ranked first among "the ten best car engines they stopped making in the past 20 years," the 4.0 L should run 200,000 miles before a rebuild is even expected and it is also able to "suffer running conditions that'd kill most motors." It is rated by SlashGear's "most reliable inline six-cylinder engines ever". The 4.0 "has a very good reputation for dependability and durability. It's generally considered indestructible."

When introduced, the block-mounted oil filter check valve was eliminated on the 4.0 (along with the 2.5 and 4.2 L engines manufactured after September 1986) when AMC engineers standardized their oil filters. The pre-1987 engines had an oil filter adapter with 3/4 (cylinder block end) and 13/16 threads (which used a GM oil filter common to Buick, Oldsmobile, Pontiac, and Cadillac V8 engines). In contrast, the 1987 through 1990 engines were fitted with a M20x1.5 metric thread filter. This was revised in 1991 to the common 3/4 threaded Mopar and Ford V8 oil filter; the oil filter adapter was redesigned where the oil filter is positioned 90 degrees offset adjacent to the starter motor — a Ford V8 oil filter can be used in place of the short filter increasing filter capacity.

The first 4.0 L engines in 1987 had a Renix (Renault/Bendix) engine management system considered quite advanced for their time. A knock sensor allowed the ECU to control spark advance in response to fuel octane and engine load. Unfortunately, few scan tools can interface with the system to pull diagnostic codes. The RENIX systems also have no permanent memory for diagnostic codes, thus making diagnosing intermittent problems more challenging.

The 1987 Renix 4.0 L was rated at 173 hp (129 kW; 175 PS) and 220 lb⋅ft (298 N⋅m). In 1988, the 4.0 received higher flowing fuel injectors, raising output to 177 hp (132 kW; 179 PS) and 224 lb⋅ft (304 N⋅m) — more power than some configurations of the Ford 302, Chevrolet 305, and Chrysler 318 V8 engines, and more than any of the Japanese 6-cylinder truck engines, but with comparable or superior fuel economy.

In 1991, a Chrysler multi-port fuel injection system replaced the RENIX system, and the intake ports were raised approximately 1/8 in (3.2 mm) for a better entry radius. Chrysler also enlarged the throttle body and redesigned the intake and exhaust manifolds for more efficiency, and the fuel injectors were replaced with higher flow units. The camshaft timing was also changed. The net result was an engine that made 190 hp (142 kW; 193 PS) and 225 lb⋅ft (305 N⋅m). Badging on most Jeeps equipped with this engine reads "4.0 Litre HIGH OUTPUT." The new cam profile combined with altered computer programming eliminated the need for an EGR valve and knock sensor, but made the engine more sensitive to alterations, especially where emissions are concerned. The OEM fuel injectors used with the Mopar MPI system (manufactured by Siemens) have been known to leak fuel especially with OBD-II where plugged catalytic converters are common which usually throws a P0420 code.

Minor changes were made to the cylinder head for the 1995 model year. In 1996, the engine block was redesigned for greater strength. The new block had more webbing and a stud girdle for added rigidity of the crankshaft main bearings. Engines installed in 1999 Grand Cherokees carried the "PowerTech" name that had been used intermittently in prior years and on other Chrysler truck and SUV engines. The name was subsequently passed on to 4.0s in the other Jeep models that used the engine, the Cherokee and Wrangler. The cylinder head was again changed for the 2000 model year to a more emissions-friendly design. This head was designated as "0331" in the casting number. Early 0331 heads are prone to cracking, causing coolant to contaminate the oil, which can lead to catastrophic engine failure. The head cracks in the center between #3 and #4 cylinders. The crack is usually discernible with the valve cover removed as a "milky" tan line. This condition is usually discovered before a catastrophic engine failure, but can lead there if not corrected promptly. A new casting was introduced to fix the issue in late 2001, but the same casting number was retained. The "fixed" heads have "TUPY" cast in the center where the cracks used to occur. Despite the new casting having a better reputation than the earlier 0331 heads, it is not unheard of for the same crack to occur on a TUPY marked cylinder head. Also new for the 2000 model year, was the distributor-less, coil on plug ignition system. Option code: ERH.

Output:

- 1987–1990: 177 hp (132 kW; 179 PS) at 4500 rpm and 224 lb⋅ft (304 N⋅m) at 2500 rpm
- 1991–1995: 190 hp (142 kW; 193 PS) at 4750 rpm and 225 lb⋅ft (305 N⋅m) at 4000 rpm
- 1996–2001: 190 hp (142 kW; 193 PS) at 4600 rpm and 225 lb⋅ft (305 N⋅m) at 3000 rpm
- 2001–2006: 190 hp (142 kW; 193 PS) at 4600 rpm and 235 lb⋅ft (319 N⋅m) at 3200 rpm

The 4.0 L engine was discontinued at the end of the 2006 model year, replaced in the redesigned 2007 JK Jeep Wrangler by Chrysler's 3.8 L OHV V6, which originated in the company's minivans.

Applications:
- 1987–2001 Jeep Cherokee
- 1993–2004 Jeep Grand Cherokee
- 1987–1990 Jeep Wagoneer
- 1987–1992 Jeep Comanche
- 1991–2006 Jeep Wrangler

=== Connecting rod lengths ===
1964–1970:

- 199 cu in (3.3 L) — 6.125 in (155.6 mm)
- 232 cu in (3.8 L) — 5.875 in (149.2 mm)
- 252 cu in (4.1 L) — 5.875 in (149.2 mm)

1971–2006:

- 232 cu in (3.8 L) — 6.125 in (155.6 mm)
- 242 cu in (4.0 L) — 6.125 in (155.6 mm)
- 258 cu in (4.2 L) — 5.875 in (149.2 mm)
- 282 cu in (4.6 L) — 5.875 in (149.2 mm)
- The displacement differs between 1990–1995 and 1996–2006 versions of the 4.0 L engines by around 1.7 cu in (0.03 L). Both had a bore of 3.875 in (98.4 mm), but the stroke decreased slightly from 3.4375 in (87.31 mm) on the earlier engine to 3.414 in (86.7 mm) on 1996 and later engines. The small stroke change of 0.03 in (0.76 mm) was accomplished by moving the piston pin and changing the crankshaft stroke; the rod length did not change.

The deck height of the AMC six-cylinder block was increased by 1/8 in (3.2 mm) (half the rod length difference) in 1971 to allow for the longer stroke required for the 258. There are only two deck heights. Tall deck is 9.528–9.534 in (242.0–242.2 mm). Short should be 9.278–9.284 in (235.7–235.8 mm). Tall is from 1974 through 1976 AMC factory service manuals; before 1974, deck height was not printed. Deck height changed slightly over the years 1977–1982 service manuals state 9.487–9.493 in (241.0–241.1 mm), the 1993 Jeep factory manual states 9.429–9.435 in (239.5–239.6 mm). Deck heights may have changed to accommodate slightly different compression ratios over the years.

The 1971 and older blocks use a "small" bell housing bolt pattern exclusive to AMC and small Nash sixes. In 1972, the bell housing bolt pattern was changed to match the AMC V8s. Its final use was in 2006 when the 4.0 L was phased out. Four bolts on the cylinder block are matched to the transmission bell housing where an adapter plate serves as a dust cover — two additional bolt holes on the transmission bellhousing used on the AMC V8 are used to secure the dust cover. The 1971 model year 258 uses the "small" pattern, the only version of the 258 to do so.

== See also ==
- AMC straight-4 engine
- AMC V8 engine
- List of AMC engines
- AMC and Jeep transmissions
- List of Chrysler engines
