= Ranges =

In the Hebrew Bible and in the Old Testament, the word ranges has two very different meanings.

== Leviticus ==
In Leviticus 11:35, ranges (כירים) probably means a cooking furnace for two or more pots, as the Hebrew word here is in the dual number; or perhaps a fireplace fitted to receive a pair of ovens.

== 2 Kings ==
In 2 Kings 11:8, the Hebrew word is here different from the preceding: שדרות, meaning "ranks of soldiers." The Levites were appointed to guard the king's person within the temple (2 Chronicles 23:7), while the soldiers were his guard in the court, and in going from the temple to the palace. The soldiers are here commanded to slay any one who should break through the "ranks" (as rendered in the Revised Version) to come near the king.

In 2 Kings 11:15, the expression, "Have her forth without the ranges (לשדרת)," is in the Revised Version, "Have her forth between the ranks;" i.e., Jehoiada orders that Athaliah should be kept surrounded by his own guards, and at the same time conveyed beyond the precincts of the temple.
