= List of AMC engines =

The American Motors Corporation (AMC) used straight-4, V4, straight-6, V6, and V8 engines in various passenger automobiles and Jeep vehicles from 1954 onward. Some engines were inherited from the merger of Nash and Hudson to form AMC in 1954, and from AMC's 1970 acquisition of Jeep from Kaiser. Several were designed entirely by the automaker. To reduce development costs and meet shifting market demands, AMC used a mix of its own engineering and engines sourced from Packard, General Motors, Volkswagen, and Renault. Engines built by AMC also saw use in cars and trucks made by other companies. The in-house-developed I6 and V8 designs were continued to be built after Chrysler acquired AMC in 1987.

== Four cylinder engines ==
American Motors used several four-cylinder engine designs.

=== Air-cooled 108 ===
This 108 cu in (1,767 cc; 1.8 L) unit is an AMC designed air-cooled V4 engine that was only used in AMC's lightweight aluminium-bodied M422 'Mighty Mite' military vehicle, built from January 1960 to January 1963 as an air transportable (by the helicopters of the time) Jeep for the United States Marine Corps. This engine was unsuitable for regular passenger-car use because it was purpose-designed and had a relatively small displacement and power output.

- Bore and stroke: 3 1/4-by-3 1/4-inch (82.6 mm × 82.6 mm)
- Compression: 7.5:1
- Horsepower: 52 hp (39 kW) at 3,600 rpm
- Torque: 90 lb⋅ft (122 N⋅m) at 2,500 rpm

=== Audi/VW 121 ===
This 121 cu in (1,984 cc; 2.0 L) unit was an advanced design overhead camshaft four-cylinder EA831 engine purchased from Audi/Volkswagen from 1977 through 1979. Though small in displacement, its advanced design produced reasonable power for its size, and, being an OHC design, it had a high redline. This engine was also used in the Audi 100, Volkswagen LT van, and Porsche 924. The engine was built in the United States to AMC requirements at an assembly plant that AMC had purchased to make it. Specifications and features differ from those of the Audi/VW/Porsche assembled engine. AMC used a carburetor, standard points ignition, and slightly larger clearances.

The original agreement was for AMC to buy the design, with the intent of eventually moving manufacturing to the United States and selling engines back to VW and Audi. American Motors bought a plant specifically to build the engine, but never sold enough to move the manufacturing. The AMC engines were assembled in the United States from major castings supplied by VW, hence the different assembly clearances. As part of the agreement, AMC was not to use the VW or Audi names when referring to the engine. However, they were virtually identical, and the automotive press commonly referred to them as Audi or VW engines. The US-spec VW/Audi/Porsche engines produced 110 hp (82 kW) in mid-1977; earlier models produced 95 hp (71 kW) approximately 15 to 30 hp (11 to 22 kW) more than the AMC version.

- Bore × stroke 3.41 in × 3.32 in (86.5 mm × 84.4 mm)
- Compression ratio 8.1:1
- Horsepower (net) 80 hp (60 kW) at 5,000 rpm
- Torque (net) 105 lb⋅ft (142 N⋅m) at 2,800 rpm

It was used in the AMC Gremlin, AMC Spirit, and AMC Concord. The only Jeep this engine was used in was the 1979 Jeep DJ (Dispatcher or Postal Delivery). In the DJ5G, it was mated only to a three-speed A904 automatic transmission with a VW/Audi pattern bellhousing. In AMC passenger cars with manual transmission, this engine was mated to a BorgWarner HR-1 four-speed transmission. Passenger cars with automatic transmissions also used the A904.

It shares the bellhousing pattern with several German cars (Audi five-cylinder inline), but not with the Volkswagen Rabbit diesel line of engines.

=== Renault 126 turbodiesel ===
The Renault-developed 126 cu in (2.1 L) 4-cylinder turbodiesel was an optional engine used in AMC's Jeep line between 1984 and 1986. It was mated to a standard four-speed or optional five-speed manual, and with either transmission delivered exceptional fuel economy. For a diesel of this size at that time, power delivery was respectable, at 85 hp (63 kW) at 3,750 rpm, 132 lb⋅ft (179 N⋅m) at 2,750 rpm. The engine was also known for relatively instant pedal response at a time when both diesel- and turbocharger-equipped engines were generally known for noticeable lag. Weighing in at only 331 pounds (150 kg), it also featured advanced technology for the time, such as an intercooler and an overhead cam.

=== Pontiac 151 ===
The 150.8 cu in (2.47 L) is commonly referred to as the "Iron Duke" and is a Pontiac design. It was purchased by AMC from 1979 through 1983 as the base option in the RWD Spirit and Concord, the 4WD Eagle models, economy versions of Jeep CJs, and in postal Jeeps. This early version used the Chevrolet small-block V8 bellhousing bolt pattern. The 1984 and later GM 151 models used a GM corporate four-cylinder/small V6 bolt pattern that AMC did not use.

- Bore × Stroke 4.00" × 3.00"
- Compression Ratio 8.2:1
- Horsepower (net) 82 hp (61 kW) @ 4,000 rpm
- Torque (net) 125 lb⋅ft (169 N⋅m) @ 2,600 rpm

=== AMC 150 ===
In 1984, AMC introduced a new four-cylinder engine. All previous fours (except the air-Cooled 108) were purchased for interim use. The AMC four continued to be used in Jeep and Eagle vehicles because production of rear-wheel drive AMC passenger cars ended after 1983.

== Six-cylinder engines ==
=== Nash and Hudson beginnings ===
When Nash and Hudson merged to form AMC in 1954, all the Hudson bodies were dropped for the 1955 model year. The Ambassador and Statesman received a hasty grille/taillight/trim/dash restyling to create the new Hudson Hornet and Wasp. The Nash Ambassador Six retained the Nash 252.6 cu in (4.1 L) OHV engine for 1955 and 1956, and was offered only with a V8 for 1957. The Nash OHV six, dating back to 1934, was a different design from the Rambler 195.6. Hudson six-cylinder cars retained the Hudson L-head six, 308 cu in (5.0 L) in the Hornet and 202 cu in (3.3 L) in the Wasp.

This was the only major Hudson component remaining - it dated back to the 1940s. All Rambler models, whether badged Hudson or Nash, used the Rambler 195.6 cu in (3.2 L) OHV six. This design dates back to 1940, when it was introduced in the Nash 600 as an L-head 172.6 cu in (2.8 L) engine. Displacement was increased over the years to 184 cu in (3.0 L) and, finally, to 195.6 in the early 1950s. The block casting was changed to allow an OHV head for the 1956 Rambler (the L-head was discontinued).

=== Rambler 195.6 ===
This engine was designed by Nash in 1940. American Motors offered an L-head (flat-head, 1955, 1958–65) and an OHV (1956–1965) version, as well as an aluminum-block version (1961–1963). All shared the same bore and stroke, as well as some other features/components.

=== Kaiser 230 ===
American Motors neither designed the Kaiser Tornado 230 cu in (3.8 L) SOHC engine nor used it in a domestic AMC-branded vehicle. Subsidiary Industrias Kaiser Argentina (IKA) produced this engine in Argentina after the 1970 merger and used it in a variety of vehicles. In the United States, this engine is often confused with the AMC/Jeep 232 cu in (3.8 L), which Kaiser Jeep purchased to replace the Kaiser engine in 1965.

The Tornado first appeared in civilian Jeep vehicles in 1963 and was only used until 1965. The US Army M-715 and derivative vehicles used it through the 1960s and early 1970s. The AMC and Kaiser engines do not share bellhousing bolt patterns. Cam trouble on the 230 was common due to inadequate oil formulations of the time.

Its under-square bore and stroke provided the engine with generous low-speed torque. It was a dependable engine, with reports of them going 250,000 miles (402,336 km) with no major problems when properly maintained. Production continued through 1983 in Argentina, where AMC used it in passenger cars and Kaiser in Jeeps.

=== Buick 225 ===
Kaiser introduced the "Dauntless" 225 cu in (3.7 L) V6 engine in the 1966 CJ and as an option in the C101 Jeepster Commando. Kaiser bought Buick's tooling to build the engines for a brief period before selling its Jeep subsidiary to AMC.

American Motors retained the Buick engine for a brief period after it bought Jeep from Kaiser. The engine was retired in 1971 shortly after AMC acquired Kaiser in 1970. American Motors sold the tooling back to General Motors in 1974.

The engine was an odd-fire V6, meaning that TDC for the cylinders was not evenly spaced around the engine but grouped in pairs. Jeep engines featured a heavier flywheel than the Buick version helping dampen vibrations caused by the engine's firing pattern. The engine was known at the time for its power and reliability. It would idle slowly, but not as smoothly as other engines, especially the inline sixes.

This engine was used in the following vehicles:

- Jeep CJ-5
- Jeep CJ-6
- C101 Jeepster Commando
- Various small Buicks from 1960 to 1964

=== The Modern Era I-6 ===
American Motors designed an entirely new six-cylinder engine for 1964 and introduced the 232 in the new Classic Hardtop as the Typhoon. In 1965, AMC introduced the more economical 199 in the Rambler American. In the 1970s, Vehículos Automotores Mexicanos (VAM) introduced a 282 cu in (4.6 L) version of the engine. American Motors and Chrysler produced the basic design constantly through 2006 (AMC was bought out by Chrysler in 1987).

232 cu in (3.8 L)
199 cu in (3.3 L)
258 cu in (4.2 L)
242 cu in (4.0 L)

The early engines' bell pattern differed from AMC V8s. In 1971, AMC raised the block height and lengthened the stroke on the 199 and early 232 engines. The 199 became 232, and the 232 version became 258. These two RB or "raised block" engines shared the small bell pattern of the earlier engines for only the 1971 model year. In 1972, both the 232 and the 258 changed the bell pattern to match AMC V8s, in conjunction with AMC's switch from Borg-Warner to Chrysler-built automatic transmissions.

=== General Motors V6 ===
171 cu in (2.8 L) GM 60-Degree LR2 V6 engine

This engine was used in:

- 1984–1986 Jeep Cherokee (XJ)
- Numerous GM vehicles

== V8 Engines ==
American Motors purchased V8 engines from Packard before introducing its in-house-designed V8. The automaker used these Packard engines exclusively in 1955 and 1956 Nash Ambassadors and Hudson Hornets. The Packard 320 cu in (5.2 L) engine was used in 1955 and was replaced by the 352 cu in (5.8 L) version for the 1956 model year. All AMC cars with Packard V8s included Packard's Ultramatic automatic transmission.

Late in 1956, AMC introduced its own V8 design in a 250 cu in (4.1 L) version, which used only in the Ambassador and Hornet Special models. The Specials were the slightly smaller and lighter Statesman/Wasp two-door hardtop bodies with Ambassador/Hornet trim. The Packard engines were dropped after 1956 in favor of the AMC-developed and built V8s.

This was AMC's first V8 engine design and became known as the Rambler V8 as they transitioned from Nash and Hudson to Rambler, heralding Rambler as an official division of American Motors Corporation.

At 601 pounds (273 kg), the Rambler V8 weighs only 26 lb (12 kg) more than Chevrolet's small block weight of 575 lb (261 kg), but its target competitor's offerings typically weighed much more, such as the largest Studebaker 289 cu in (4.7 L) V8, weighing around 675 lb (306 kg).

In 1957, AMC introduced a 327 cu in (5.4 L) V8 version in the Rambler Rebel. It gave the car an advantageous power-to-weight ratio, making it one of the first muscle cars.

All 1956-1966 AMC Rambler V8 engines feature a 10 inches (254 mm) deck height, which by Ford standards, is the dividing line between 'small blocks' and 'big blocks'.

All 1966 through 1991 AMC V8s share the 4.75-inch bore spacing as the previous Rambler V8 as well as the same crankshaft-to-camshaft centerline distance. This second AMC V8 design weighs less for numerous technical reasons. The basic 1966 through 1991 AMC V8 engine weighs around 540 pounds (245 kg).

The 360 cu in (5.9 L) AMC V8 continued to be manufactured after Chrysler bought out American Motors in 1987, and was the only engine available in the Jeep Grand Wagoneer through the 1991 model year.

=== AMC Rambler V8 10" Tall Deck (1956–1966) (also known as AMC Gen1 V8) ===
250 cu in (4.1 L)
287 cu in (4.7 L)
327 cu in (5.4 L)

=== AMC Short-Deck V8 square port exhaust (1966–1970) (also known as AMC Gen2 V8) ===
290 cu in (4.8 L)
343 cu in (5.6 L)
"AMX" 390 cu in (6.4 L)

=== AMC Raised-Deck V8 dog leg port exhaust (1970–1991) (also known as AMC Gen3 V8) ===
304 cu in (5.0 L)
360 cu in (5.9 L)
390 cu in (6.4 L)
401 cu in (6.6 L)

== See also ==
- AMC straight-4 engine
- AMC straight-6 engine
- AMC V8 engine
- AMC and Jeep transmissions
- List of Chrysler engines
