= AMC straight-4 engine =

4 cylinder internal combustion engine

AMC Straight-4 engine
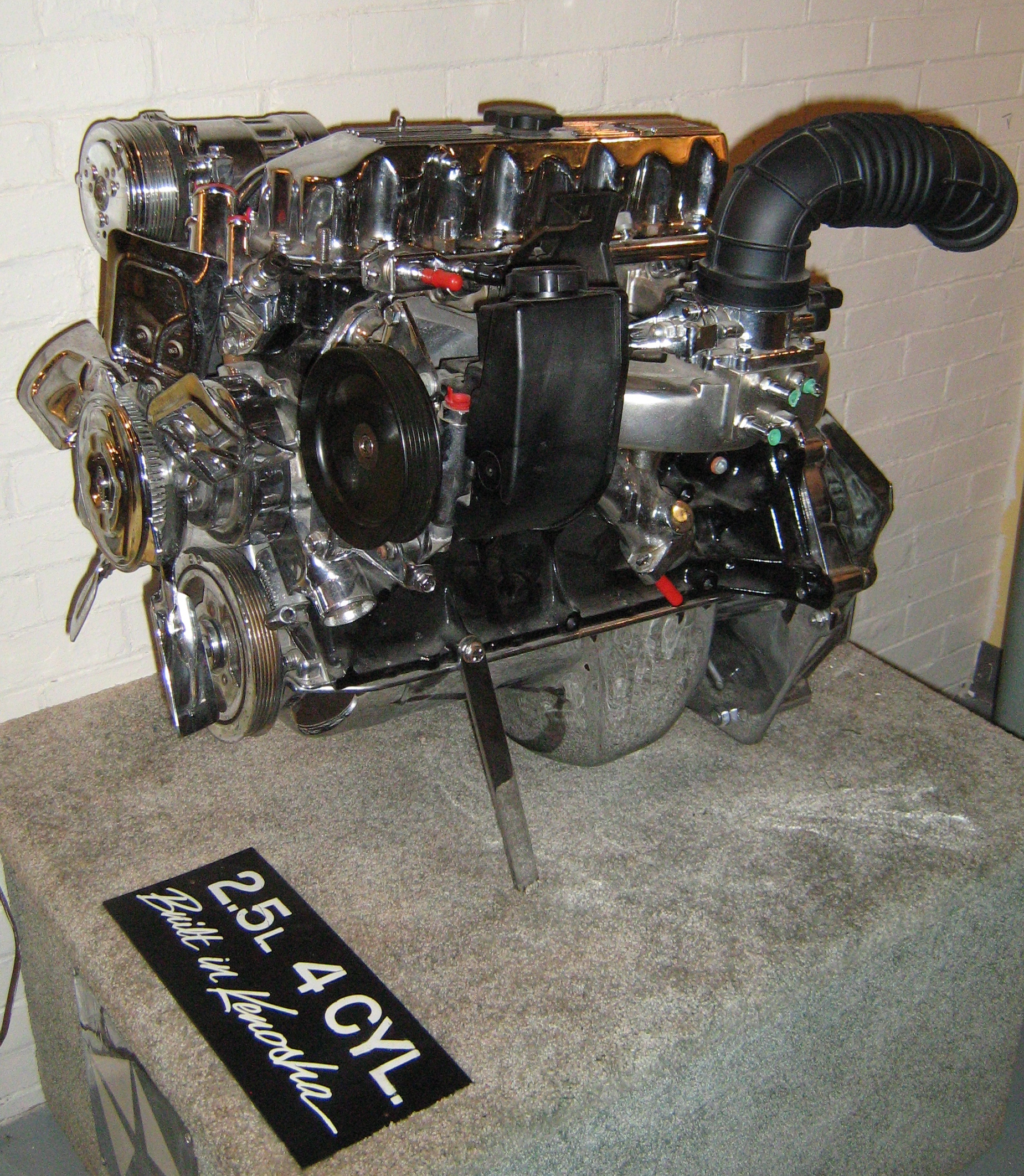
- 2.5 L AMC straight-4 with MPFI

Overview
- Manufacturer: American Motors (1984 – September 1987); Chrysler (September 1987 – 2002); Beijing Jeep Corporation (1984 – 2008)
- Also called: PowerTech
- Production: 1984–2002 (2008 in China)

Layout
- Configuration: Straight-4
- Displacement: 150.4 cu in (2.5 L)
- Cylinder bore: 3.875 in (98.4 mm)
- Piston stroke: 3.1875 in (80.96 mm)
- Cylinder block material: Cast iron
- Cylinder head material: Cast iron
- Valvetrain: OHV 2 valves per cylinder
- Compression ratio: 9.1–9.2:1

Combustion
- Fuel system: Carter YFA single barrel Carburetor; Renix Throttle-body fuel injection; Mopar Sequential multi-point fuel injection
- Fuel type: Gasoline
- Oil system: Wet sump
- Cooling system: Water-cooled

Output
- Power output: 105–130 hp (106–132 PS; 78–97 kW)
- Torque output: 132–150 lb⋅ft (179–203 N⋅m)

Chronology
- Predecessor: GM Iron Duke engine; Chrysler 2.2 & 2.5 engine
- Successor: Chrysler 1.8, 2.0 & 2.4 engine

The AMC straight-4 engine is a 2.5 L straight-four engine developed by American Motors Corporation (AMC) that was used in a variety of AMC, Jeep, and Dodge vehicles from 1984 through 2002.

The 2.5 L I4 Jeep engine shared design elements and some internal components with the AMC 4.0 L I6 that was introduced for the 1987 model year. The 2.5 L engine was designed specifically for the vehicles it went into and became known for its reliability and longevity.

The GM Iron Duke was a predecessor I4 engine in some AMC vehicles, but it shares nothing in common with the AMC 2.5 L. The Chrysler 2.5 L I4 shares nothing, and this successor engine family was designed to improve emissions and fuel economy.

== Development ==
American Motors devoted three years to the development of a new four-cylinder engine. The brand new engine was designed to use AMC's existing spacing between the cylinder bores so that the tooling remained the same. The location of other major components, such as the distributor, oil filter, and starter, were also kept the same to use the machine tools for the AMC straight-6 engine.

According to Jeep's chief engineer, Roy Lunn, "Unlike most engines available today [it] was not designed for passenger cars and then adapted for trucks. We specifically developed it with our Jeep vehicles and Eagle in mind. That's the reason that performance and durability were of such prime consideration from the very beginning."

Although some of the components were interchangeable between the AMC 258 cu in (4.2 L) six-cylinder and the new engine, the four-cylinder was not a cut-down version of the big six. Noted Roy Lunn, "There are some common parts, but the 4-cylinder includes many unique items such as its own electronics systems. It also has a shorter stroke and larger bore. The valves are larger and the pistons are new." Roy Lunn recollected, "We wanted as much displacement – for power and torque – as possible within the confines of bore centers of the tooling. The only parameter we could influence substantially was stroke. So we picked the largest bore and stroke in order to get 2.5 Liters."

== Design ==
The AMC 150 cu in (2.5 L) engine has a bore and stroke of 3.875 in × 3.1875 in (98.43 mm × 80.96 mm) for an overall displacement of 2,458.06 cc (150 cu in). The 2.5 L I4 head lost two cylinders in its center compared to the original 258 cu in (4.2 L) I6 design. A new cylinder head for the 2.5 L I4 engine featured a double-quench combustion chamber. Its shape provides little space at the front and rear when the piston rises to the top of its compression stroke. These "squish" areas cause the air-fuel mixture to be more turbulent in the center of the chamber, making a more uniform mix followed by a faster burn from the spark. The head combustion chamber and port design were later used on the 4.0 L engine.

The 2.5 L engine also features five main bearings and eight overhead valves. The new engine retained the water pump and front housing as well as connecting rods from AMC's existing I6 engines. The timing chain is a "super-duty" double-roller design with the added protection of an automatic tensioner. The initial versions included a distributor with conventional mechanical and vacuum advance featuring a computer, and individual cylinder knock sensors that can advance up to 6 degrees when the engine is running knock-free or compensate for low-quality fuel in two-degree steps for up to 12 degrees of spark retard.

The 1984 and 1985 engines included a one-barrel carburetor. Starting in 1986, a throttle-body fuel injection system took advantage of the engine's breathing capacity. The redesign included a revised computerized spark curve and 10% higher cranking speeds due to a new lighter weight - going from 17 to 8 lb (8 to 4 kg)), low-current draw permanent-magnet starters with compact planetary reduction gears.

American Motors introduced plastic quick-connect fittings with pre-attached vacuum hoses starting with the 1987 model year. This reduced the maze of vacuum hoses, reduced mistakes on the assembly line, and made checking for leaks easy before joining each connector half.

The engine's reliability can be partially credited to its simple valvetrain design using hydraulic lifters, pushrods, and rocker arms. American Motors incorporated hardened exhaust valve seat inserts that are typically used only on aluminum heads. A thinner wall between the exhaust valve seats and the water jacket was incorporated in the head casting to enhance heat transfer. These improvements allowed the engine to sail through AMC's tough 1,000-hour torture tests.

Instead of the standard AMC bell housing bolt pattern, AMC/Jeep engineers adopted the General Motors small V6 and four-cylinder bolt pattern (commonly used with GM's transverse-mounted powerplants) for their new engine for two reasons. First, the new AMC 2.5 replaced the four-cylinder engines purchased from GM. Second, AMC continued to purchase the 2.8 L V6 from GM until the 4.0 L I6 was introduced in 1987.

The AMC 2.5 L I4 and GM's V6 shared the same drivetrain components in Jeep vehicles, whereas stronger transmissions were needed for the new 4.0 L. The 2.5 L also shared an 18mm threaded oil filter used with the GM 2.8 L (ACDelco PF47 or equivalent) through 1986, when the 4.0 L was phased into production with the XJ models, the oil filter was changed over to a 20mm thread size shared with Renaults until 1991.

The AMC I4 first appeared in 1984 model year with the new XJ Cherokee. In 1986, the head underwent a minor revision: the head bolts were increased from 7/16 to 1/2 inch. From 1997 until 2002, it was marketed as the "PowerTech I4." It was produced through 2002 for the Jeep Wrangler, as well as for the Dodge Dakota pickup that also featured the AMC/Jeep-designed four-cylinder as its standard engine on regular-cab, rear-wheel-drive models from 1996 through 2002.

This lightweight engine is similar to its "big brother" 4.0 L, and although not as powerful, it is durable with no reliability issues. It has become "notorious for lasting well beyond 200,000 miles, and some owners report putting upwards of 300,000 miles on their 2.5-liter-equipped Jeeps." The AMC 2.5 L is ranked among the best of Jeep's I4 engines and is regarded for its build.

It was not known to be the most powerful engine, but it has an almost flat torque curve, making it as robust as the modern iterations in the early 2020s.

Initially rated at 105 hp (78 kW; 106 PS) and 132 ft⋅lb (179 N⋅m) of torque using throttle body injection, output the final year was 121 hp (90 kW; 123 PS) at 5400 rpm and 145 ft⋅lb (197 N⋅m) of torque at 3250 rpm using sequential multiple-port fuel injection (MPFI). For comparison, the 258 CID I6 provided 112 hp (84 kW; 114 PS) at 3200 rpm and 210 ft⋅lb (280 N⋅m) of torque at 2000 rpm in its final year with the computer-controlled carburetor.

For several years, the engine was detuned for the Wrangler; from at least 1992 through 1995, it produced 130 hp (97 kW; 132 PS) and 149 ft⋅lb (202 N⋅m) of torque with 9.2:1 compression ratio in the Cherokee and Comanche.

When emissions and fuel economy are a priority, the final MPFI versions of AMC's 2.5 L engine are considered superior. Tests of the newly downsized 1984 Jeep XJ with the initial carbureted version and five-speed manual transmission returned 15.3 mpg_{‑US} (15.4 L/100 km; 18.4 mpg_{‑imp}) on the first tankful. Strictly in terms of miles per gallon fuel efficiency in stock Jeep Wrangler applications, Motor Trend described "almost no difference" between the 2.5 L I4 and 4.0 L I6 engines, but the 4.0 having an advantage in on- and off-road drivability.

Fuel system	Compression ratio	Horsepower	Torque
One-barrel carburetor (1984–1985)	9.2:1	105 hp (78 kW; 106 PS) at 5,000 rpm	132 ft⋅lb (179 N⋅m) at 2,800 rpm
Throttle body injection (TBI) (1986–1990)	9.2:1	117 hp (87 kW; 119 PS) at 5,000 rpm	135 ft⋅lb (183 N⋅m) at 3,500 rpm
Multi-point fuel injection (MPFI) (1991–2002)	9.1:1	120 hp (89 kW; 122 PS) at 5,250 rpm	139 ft⋅lb (188 N⋅m) at 3,250 rpm

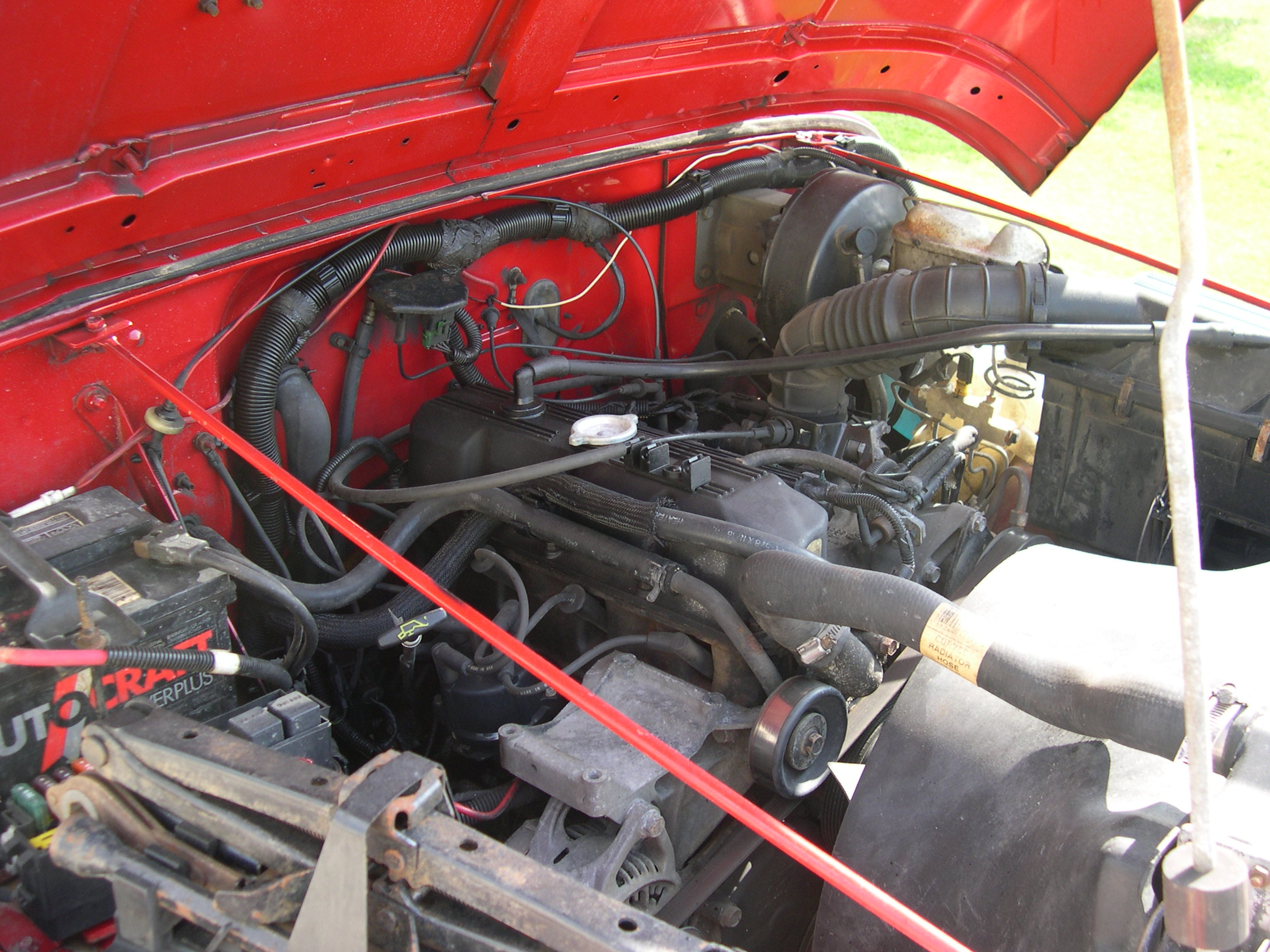
2.5 L AMC straight-4 in a 1992 Jeep YJ

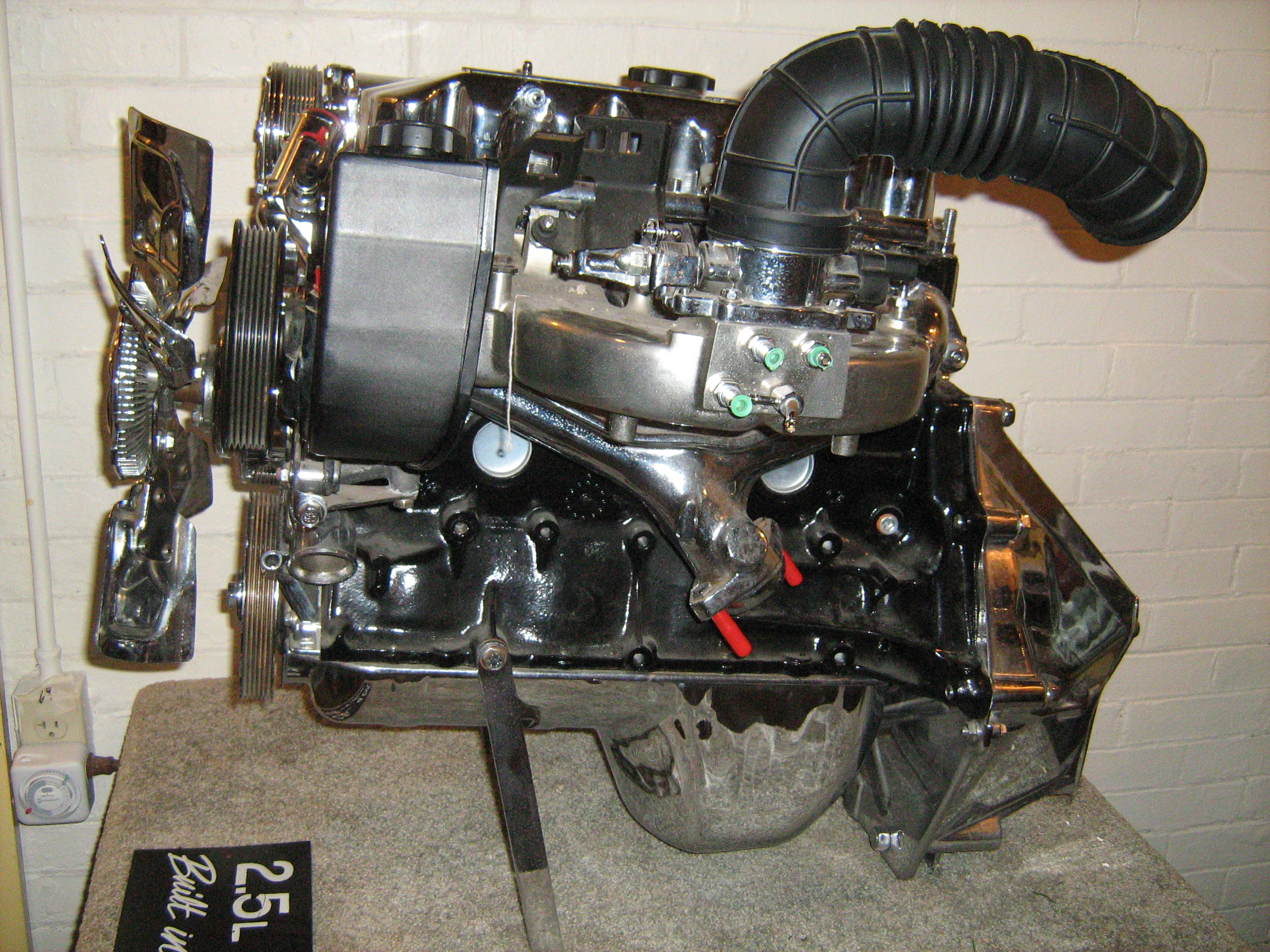
2.5 L AMC I4 built in Kenosha, WI, on display

Note that the TBI system was made by Renix and used from mid-1986 through August 1990.

== Applications ==
The AMC 150 cu in (2.5 L) engine was used in the following vehicles:

- 1983–1984 Jeep DJ-5M
- 1983–1984 AMC Eagle
- 1984–1986 Jeep CJ-7
- 1984–2000 Jeep Cherokee (XJ)
- 1986–1992 Jeep Comanche (MJ)
- 1987–2002 Jeep Wrangler (YJ/TJ)
- 1988–1989 Eagle Premier
- 1996–2002 Dodge Dakota

== In China ==
AMC's Chinese joint venture Beijing Jeep Corporation also manufactured the 150 cubic-inch inline-four for installation in the locally built XJ Cherokee, originally called the Beijing Jeep BJ213 Cherokee. Local manufacturing began in 1984, and the engine's name was C498QA in China. A wide variety of variants and code names were applied to the Cherokee over the years, with the most drastic change being the facelifted Beijing Jeep 2500 which arrived in 2002. Beijing Jeep also developed a stroked 2.7 L version called the C498QA3, which entered production around 2003. This fuel-injected engine displaces 2,744 cc (167.4 cu in), produced 96 kW (131 PS; 129 hp) at 4800 rpm and was installed in a variant of the 2500 model called the Jeep 2700.

From the beginning of the Jeep joint venture, Beijing had envisioned installing the C498QA engine in the original Beijing Jeep, with trial installation taking place in 1986 (the BJ 212 E model). However, the first derivative of the old Beijing Jeep to be fitted with the American engine was the facelifted BJ 2020 V of 1999. Beijing's BJ 752 prototype sedan was also fitted with the Jeep Cherokee engine, but only three examples were built in 1987 and 1988. After the joint venture was dissolved in 2009, manufacture of the Cherokee continued under the Beijing Auto Works (BAW) name. However, BAW only installed the C498QA engine in their Cherokee-based BJ2025 Leichi SUV from 2004 until 2008.

== See also ==
- AMC straight-6 engine
- AMC V8 engine
- List of AMC engines
- AMC and Jeep transmissions
- List of Chrysler engines
