= Model 80 =

Model 80 may refer to:

== Aircraft ==
- Beech Model 80, a twin-piston-engine civil utility aircraft
- Boeing Model 80, an airliner introduced in 1982
- Fleet Model 80 Canuck, a civil utility aircraft introduced in 1946
- Stearman Model 80, a commercial biplane

== Other ==
- Dana/Spicer Model 80, an automotive axle
- IBM PS/2 Model 80, a high-end member of the PS/2 family of personal computers

== See also ==
- M80 (disambiguation)
