= K311 cargo truck =

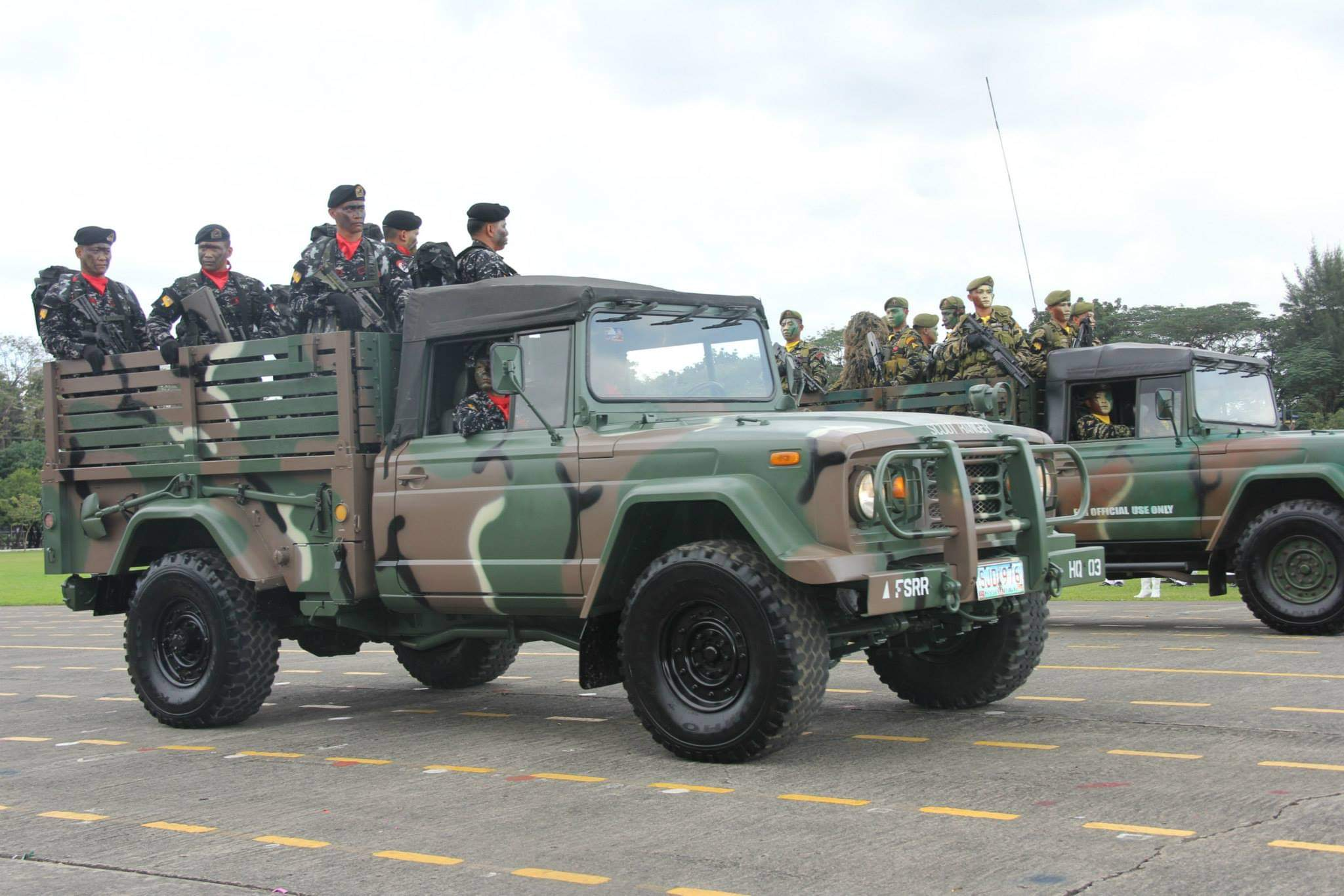
- Philippine Army KM450
- Type: 1 1/4–ton cargo truck
- Place of origin: South Korea

Service history
- In service: K311: 1980–present K311A1: 2003–present
- Used by: See Operators
- Wars: Iraq War; Moro conflict New People's Army rebellion Civil conflict in the Philippines; Mali War; Russo-Ukrainian War; 2023 Nigerien coup d'état 2023 Nigerien crisis

Production history
- Designed: 1980
- Manufacturer: Asia Motors (1980–1999); Kia Motors (1999–present) MIC Sudan; Bogdan Corporation (2015–2021); Wad Youngsan Industries (2016–present); ISEVEM (2025–present)
- Unit cost: 60 million KRW (2016)
- Produced: K311 (1980–2003); K311A1 (2003–present)

Specifications
- Mass: 3,150 kg (curb)
- Length: 5.46 m
- Width: 2.18 m
- Height: 2.45 m
- Crew: 2 + 12 passengers
- Engine: K311: Kia/Mazda ZB 6-cylinder water-cooled diesel engine 115 hp K311A1: Hyundai/Mitsubishi Fuso D4DA in-line 4-cylinder diesel engine 130 hp @ 2,900 rpm KM450: Hyundai/Mitsubishi Fuso D4DA/D4DD in-line 4-cylinder diesel engine 130/139 hp @ 2,900 rpm
- Payload capacity: K311: 1,150 kg K311A1: 1,530 kg (paved) or 1,330 kg (unpaved); KM450: 2,500 kg (paved)
- Transmission: Allison Transmission 5-speed manual & 2-speed part time transfer case
- Ground clearance: longitudinal slope: 60 % lateral slope: 30 % ground clearance: 0.254 m fording: 0.76 m
- Operational range: K311: 450 km K311A1: 700 km KM450: 750 km
- Maximum speed: K311: 96 km/h K311A1: 100 km/h KM450: 104 km/h
- References: Kia Corp; K311A1 is the specification from 2003, and KM450 is an updated specification from unknown year.

The K311 is a 4x4 multipurpose 1 1/4–ton class cargo truck developed for the Republic of Korea Armed Forces, and was introduced in 1980. It is commonly known as 4-5 (5/4) ton (4-5 톤) or military Dodge (군용 닷지), because it replaced the Dodge M37 and had a similar appearance. It is a modernized version of the American Kaiser Jeep M715 truck, which was also designed with an intention to replace the M37 truck. (Note: It is unclear what kind of contracts were made due to lack of sources. There is a possibility that the U.S. government provided the blueprint for free to South Korea to keep the supplies manufactured, similar way the U.S. did to other military gears that are no longer produced in the U.S. but used by South Korea.)

The truck was produced by Asia Motors until Hyundai merged the company with Kia Motors in 1999. (Note: Kia Group acquired Asia Motors in 1976. Later, both Asia Motors and Kia Motors were owned by Hyundai in 1998.) The KM450 is an export name designated by Kia Motors, and the name is used widely outside of South Korea for both old and new variants.

== General Characteristics ==
=== K311A1 ===
In June 2000, Kia Motors signed a deal with Turkish company, and began product improvement program (PIP) on K131, K311, and K511 series. The export plan was cancelled due to 2001 Turkish economic crisis; nonetheless, Kia Motors, which has already spent a lot of money, decided that it could not stop the project, and invested a total of 10.43 billion KRW to finish the program by April 2003.

To distinguish K311 and K311A1, check the number of front windshields (two: K311 or one: A1), the number of wipers (two: K311 or three: A1), tire thickness (wider: A1), engine (V6: K311 or V4: A1), and bullbar design.

=== K311A2 ===
The K311A2 is a second upgrade variant of the K311 first revealed at DX Korea 2018. It has a hardtop roof on driving section, air conditioner, and navigation system as a default. The vehicle is unlikely to be adopted by South Korea as K311s are being replaced with K151 series.

== Variants ==
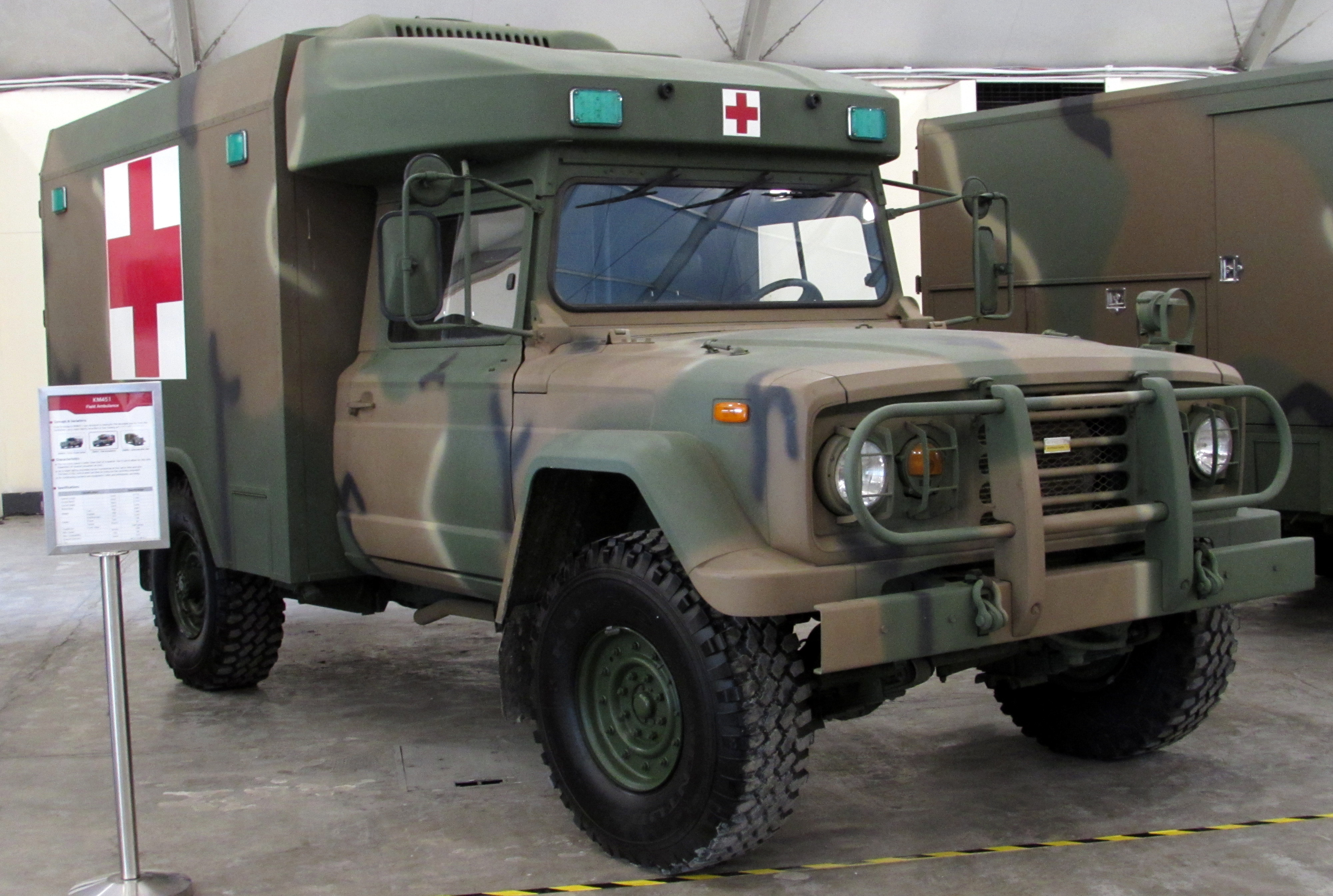
Philippine Army KM451 Ambulance

- K311 (KM450) Cargo Truck: Introduced in 1980.
  - K311A1 (KM450) Cargo Truck: Upgraded variant. Introduced in 2003.
  - K311A1 (KM450) Chassis
  - K311A1 (KM454) Shelter Cargo
- K312 (KM451) Ambulance: Introduced in 1982. All were converted to K311 cargo truck after replacing with K312A1 by 2014, 5 years ahead the schedule.
  - K312A1 (KM451) Ambulance: Upgraded variant. Introduced in 2005. It has an air conditioning system, 22 additional kits, and other life support items.
- K313 (KM452) Shop Van: Introduced in 1985.
  - K313A1 (KM452) Shop Van: Upgraded variant. Introduced in 2007.
- K314 Communication Equipment Installation Vehicle
- K315 Cipher Vehicle
- K316 (KM453) NBC Reconnaissance: Introduced in 1996.
- K317 Biological Reconnaissance: Introduced in 2002. Developed to prepare for possible biological terrorism during the 2002 FIFA World Cup.
- K319 Bulletproof Truck: Introduced in 2004. Developed for use by the Zaytun Division during the Iraq War.

Other variations with unknown/no given model number

- 1¼ ton Cargo Truck - RHD
- Artillery Commanding Vehicle
- Cargo Truck - Generator
- Communication Shelter Mounted Vehicle
- Electronic Weather Monitor Mounted Vehicle
- Field Catering Truck
- Military Caravan
- Smoke Generator Mounted Vehicle

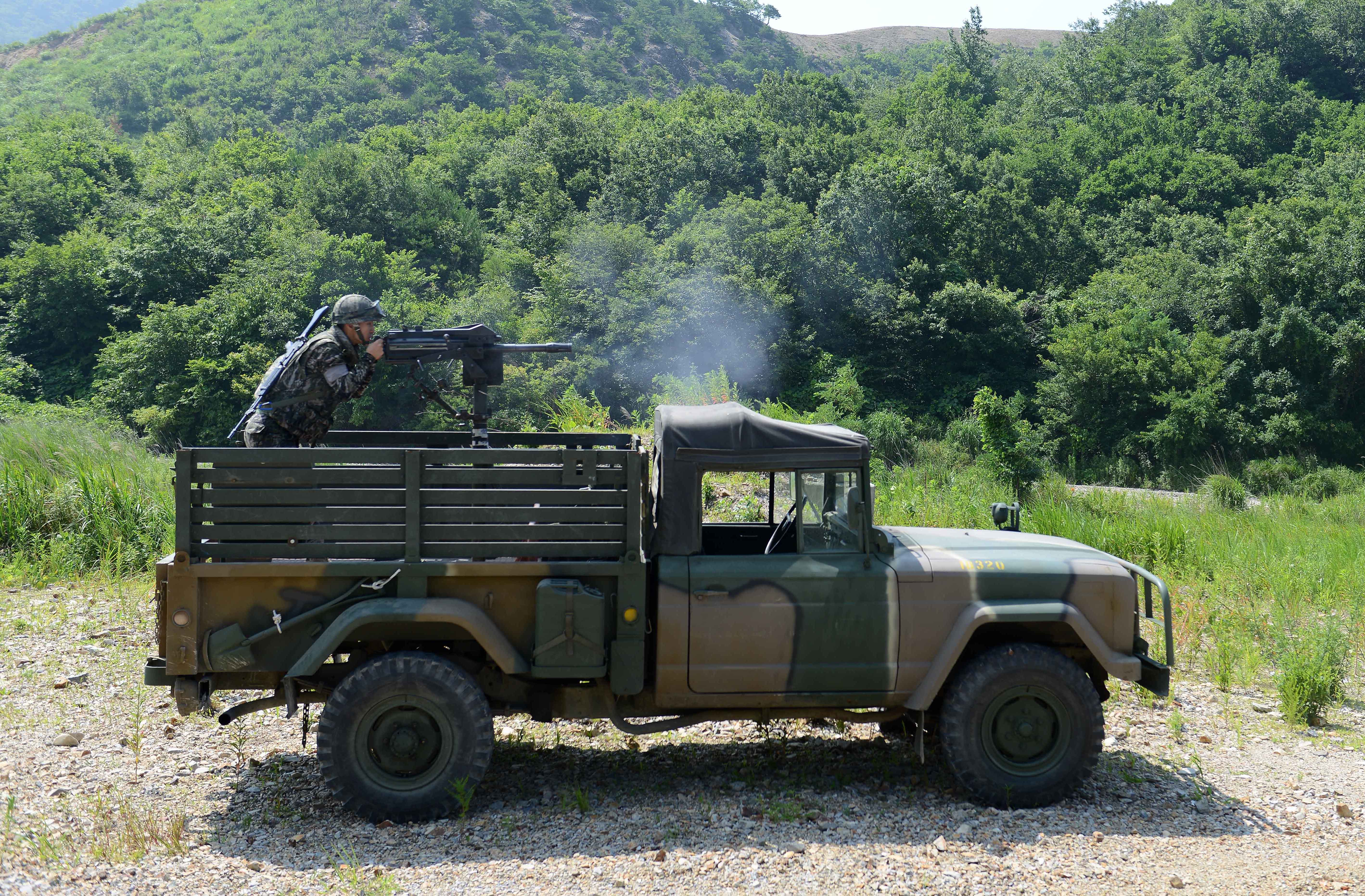
Daewoo K4 automatic grenade launcher mounted on the K311

List of guns or other systems mounted on the truck

- 70 mm MLRS (prototype)
- CS/LM5 rotary gun
- DShK heavy machine gun
- K-1450-06 command post
- K4 automatic grenade launcher
- KP-SAM MANPADS
- KPV heavy machine gun
- Liberator Elevated Tactics System
- M2 Browning heavy machine gun
- Mk 19 grenade launcher
- Taka-1 MLRS
- Taka-2 MLRS
- ZPU anti-aircraft gun
- ZU-23-2 anti-aircraft autocannon

Foreign variants

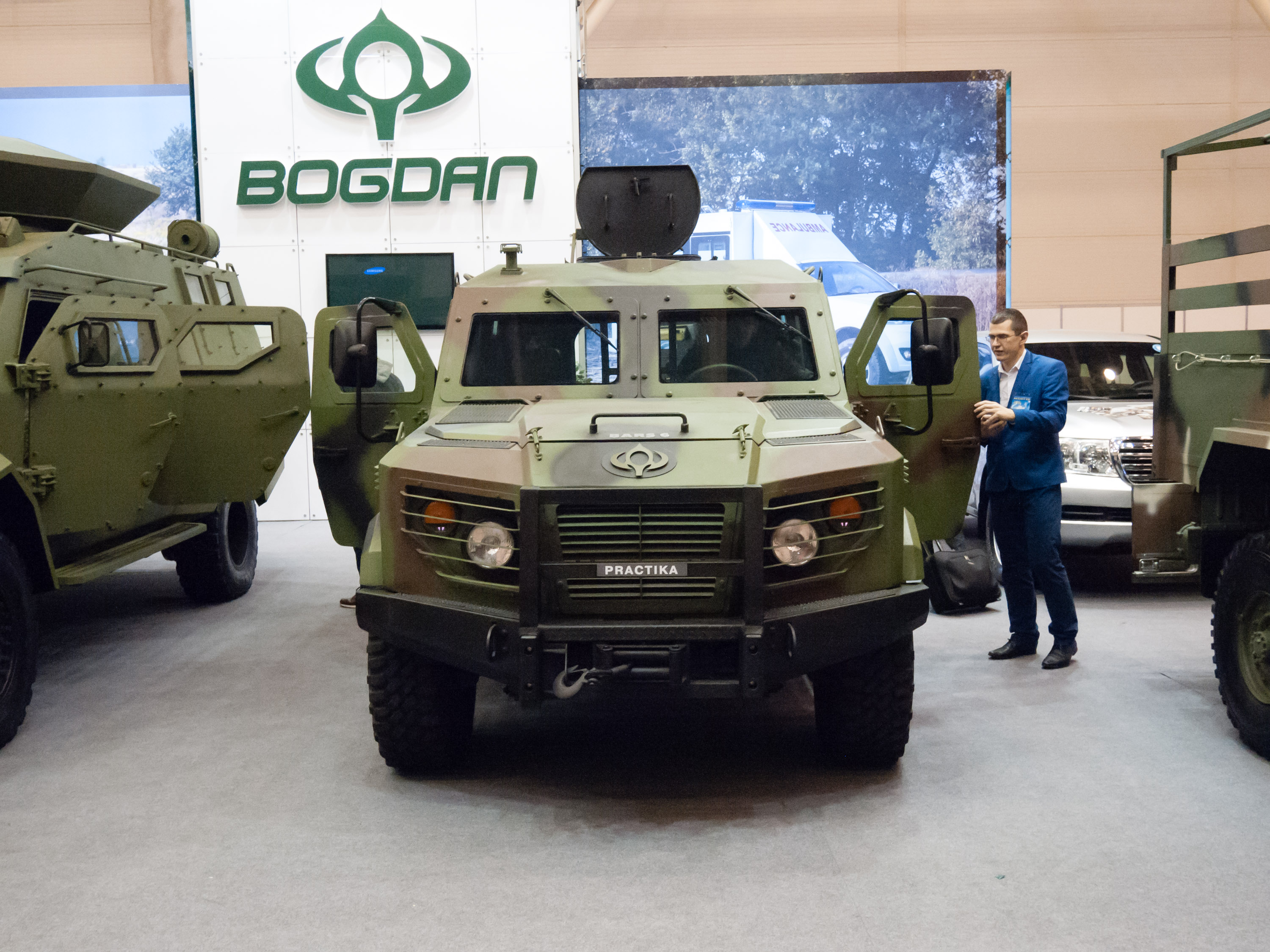
Ukrainian Bogdan Bars-6 built on KM450 chassis

- (Sudan) SarSar-1: Sudanese armored reconnaissance vehicle based on the KM450 chassis.
- (Sudan) SarSar-2: Sudanese armored reconnaissance vehicle based on the KM450 chassis.
- (Ukraine) Bogdan Bars-6: Ukrainian armored utility vehicle based on KM450 chassis.

== Operators ==
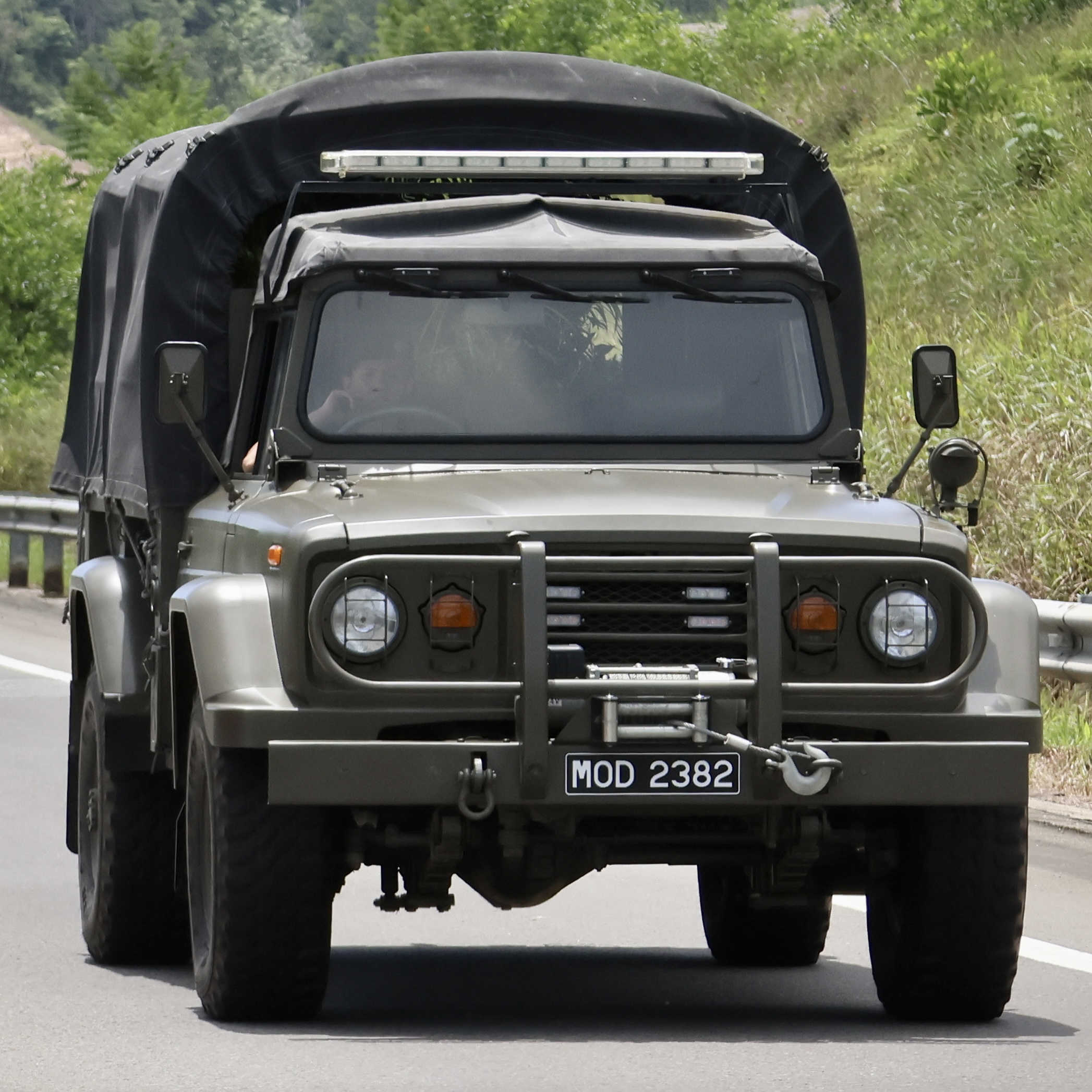
Bruneian KM450

Benin

- Operated since 2018.

Botswana

- Received KM450 in 2018.

Brunei

- Received KM450 in 2018.

Cambodia

- South Korea donated 50 K311s in 2012. Another batch of unspecified number of K311s was donated in 2017.

Central African Republic

Chile

- Used by Chilean Marine Corps.

Colombia

- Uses K311s.

Mali

- Local assembly by Korean-Malian joint company Wad Youngsan Industries S.A. in Banankoro since 2016.

Mongolia

- South Korea donated 13 K311s in 2012 along with other equipment to support Mongolian UN PKO missions in Afghanistan and Sudan.

Niger

- Operated since at least 2019. Acquired 100 vehicles in July 2022. Acquired 100 vehicles in January 2023. Purchased 100 vehicles for Nigerien special forces in March 2023.

Nigeria

Philippines: Received 1,603 KM450s, 180 KM451s, 34 KM452s, and 157 K311s.

- 651 KM450s in 2007. 157 K311s (donation) in 2010. 60 KM451s in 2012. 717 KM450s in 2015. 60 KM451s in 2016. 215 KM450s and 4 KM452s (donation) in 2019. 60 KM451s in 2020. 20 KM450s in 2021. 30 KM452s in 2023.

Saudi Arabia

Senegal

- Received in 2024. In November of the same year, Senegal invested 35 billion CFA to establish a defense industry by partnering with South Korea. In December 2025, Senegal inaugurated its first military vehicle assembly factory ISEVEM (Industrie Senegalaise de Vehicules Militaires) in Diamniadio with an assembly capacity of 1,000 CKD kits per year.

South Korea

- Operates more than 10,000 vehicles as of 2016.

South Sudan

Sudan

- Local production by the Military Industry Corporation (MIC) of Sudan.

Ukraine

- The KM450 chassis was used for manufacturing Bogdan Bars-6 armored vehicle since 2015. In 2021, the chassis was selected to replace R-125 KshM, which is a command vehicle variant based on the UAZ-3151. It was produced by Bogdan Motors to supply to Telekart-Prylad for installing K-1450-06 KshM on the truck. However, Bogdan Motors filed bankruptcy in same year. 20 chassis were purchased at the auction by the charity created by Serhiy Prytula, and were donated for military use.

=== Non-state operators ===
Coordination of Azawad Movements

- Captured from Mali.

Islamic State in the Greater Sahara (ISGS)

- Captured from Mali.

(Islamic State) Jama'at Nasr al-Islam wal Muslimin (JNIM)

- Captured from Mali.

Wagner Group

- Provided by Mali.

Houthi

- Captured from Yemeni Army.

== See also ==
- Dodge M37
- Kaiser Jeep M715
