= Kaiser Jeep M715 =

Kaiser M715
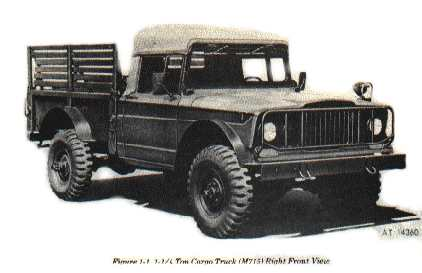

Overview
- Manufacturer: Kaiser Jeep
- Also called: Five Quarter; Rastrojero M715 (Argentina)
- Production: 1967–1969; 30,500–33,000 built
- Assembly: United States: Toledo, Ohio (Toledo Complex)

Body and chassis
- Class: Full-size pickup truck
- Layout: Front engine, four-wheel drive
- Related: Jeep Gladiator (SJ)

Powertrain
- Engine: 230 cu in (3.8 L) Tornado I6 (gasoline)
- Transmission: Warner T-98 4-speed manual

Dimensions
- Length: 209.75 in (5,328 mm)
- Width: 85 in (2,159 mm)
- Height: At bed (with cargo cover installed): 87.7 in (2,228 mm); At cab 75 in (1,905 mm), Reducible to 59 in (1,499 mm)

Chronology
- Predecessor: Dodge M37
- Successor: Dodge M-880 series K311 (KM450) series

The 1 1/4-ton, 4×4, Kaiser Jeep M715, sometimes called the "Five quarter (ton)", for its 1 1/4 (or 5/4) ton payload rating, is an American light military truck, based on the civilian Jeep Gladiator (SJ). Design and development for the M715 began in 1965, intended to replace the Dodge M37. In a departure from its purpose-built predecessor, the M715 was the first "M"-series U.S. tactical vehicle to use primarily commercial components; the first in a series of militarized commercial off-the-shelf (COTS) vehicle procurements.

== Variants ==
Aside from the basic M715 cargo/troop carrier, the M715 series included the M724 bare cab and chassis, usually combined with a contact maintenance utility tool body, M725 ambulance, and M726 telephone maintenance utility tool body variants, all 1 1/4-ton, 4×4. From 1967 to 1969, between 30,500 and 33,000 trucks were produced at the Toledo, Ohio, plant. The M-715 family saw service in the Vietnam War, but was considered underpowered and fragile, compared to the purpose-built Dodge M37 tactical trucks it was intended to replace. From 1976 onwards, the U.S. military replaced the M715 series with the Dodge M880 series, again a 1 1/4-ton militarized COTS truck.

Kia currently produces an M715-type vehicle named the KM450 for the South Korean Army on license from the U.S. government. In 2010 Mopar developed the concept vehicle Jeep NuKizer 715. It was a tribute to the original M715. For the 2016 50th annual Easter Jeep Safari in Moab, Utah, FCA (Chrysler) showed the Jeep Crew Chief 715 concept truck, again a nod to the Kaiser 715

== Service record and issues ==
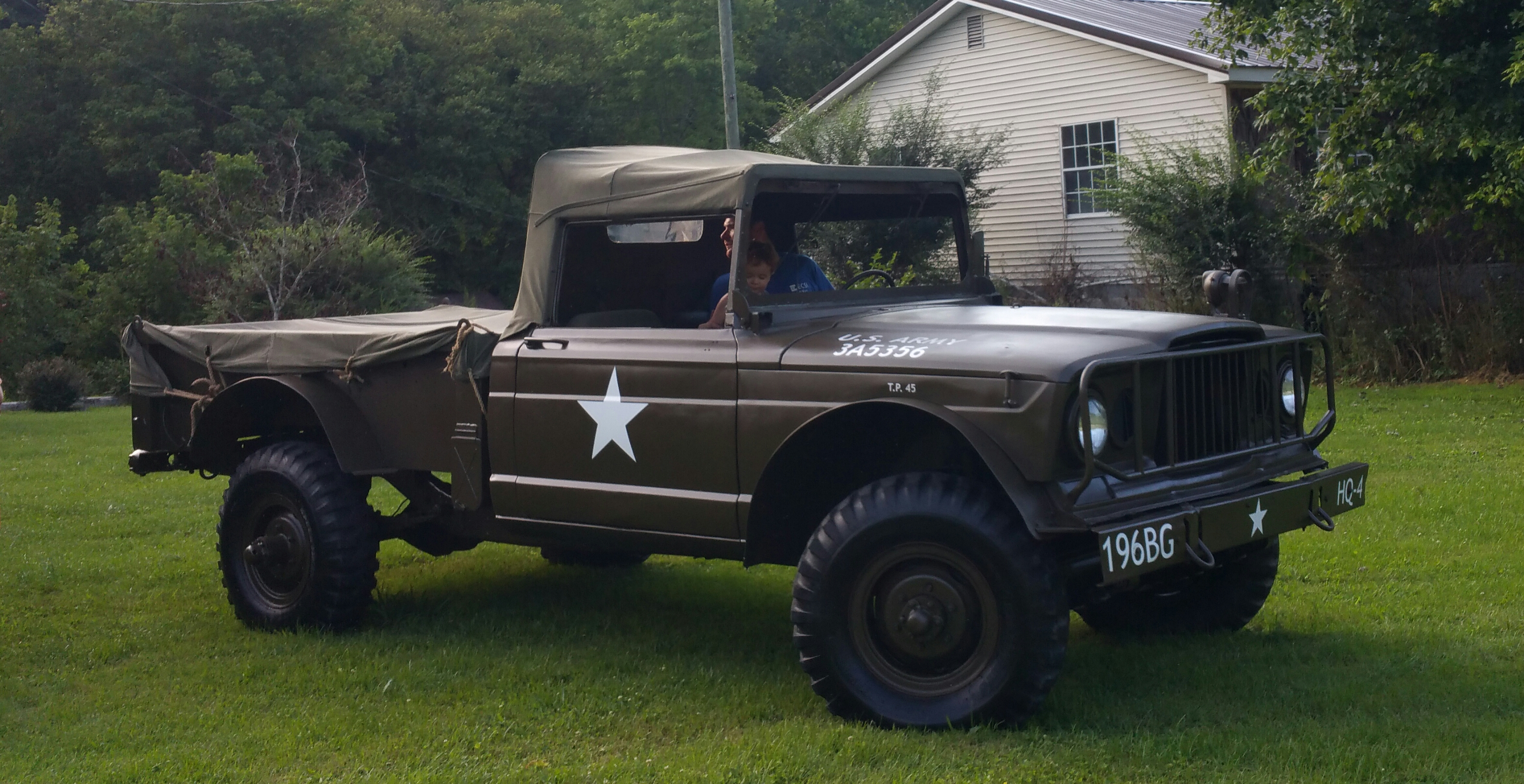
1968 Kaiser Jeep M715

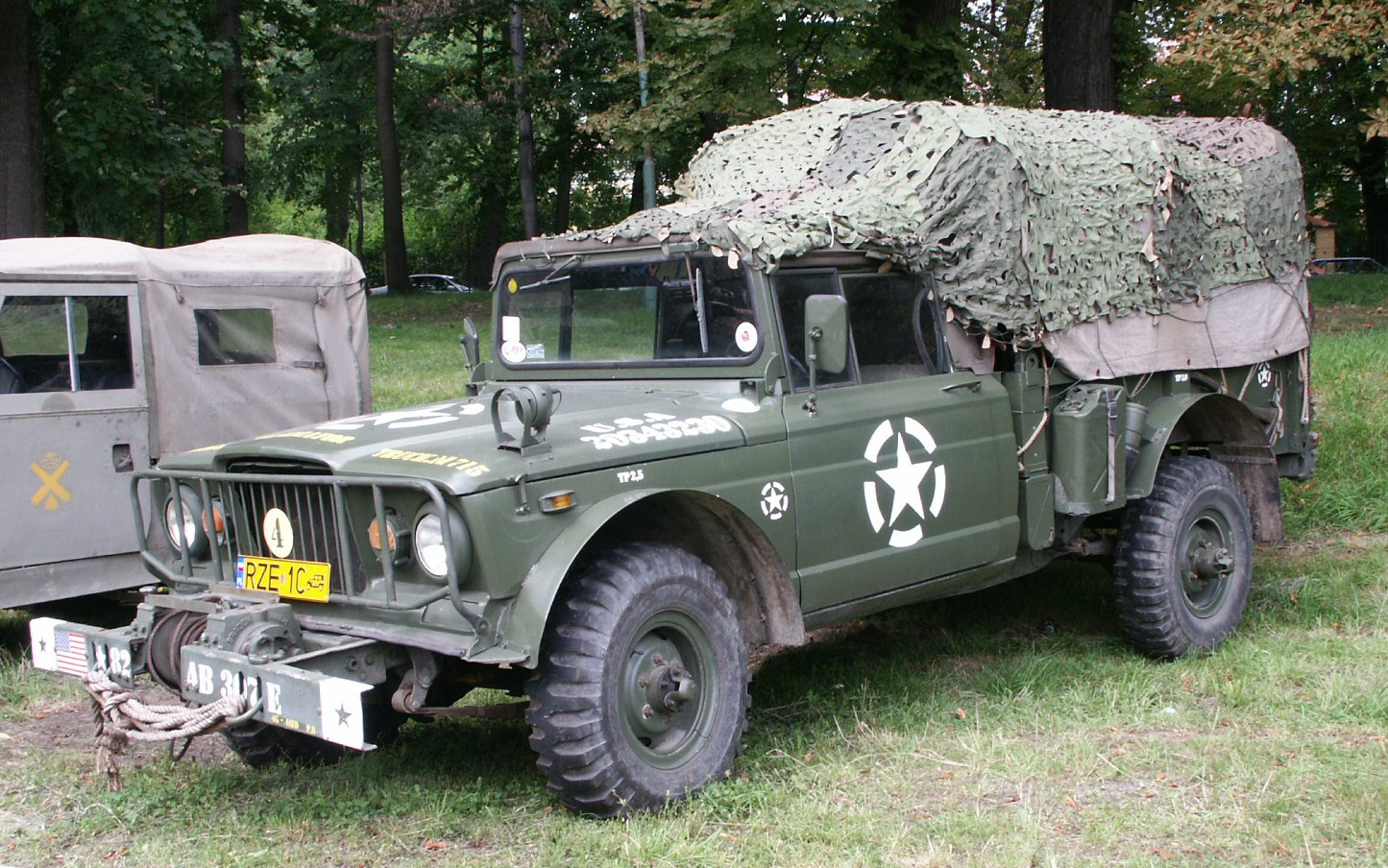
M715

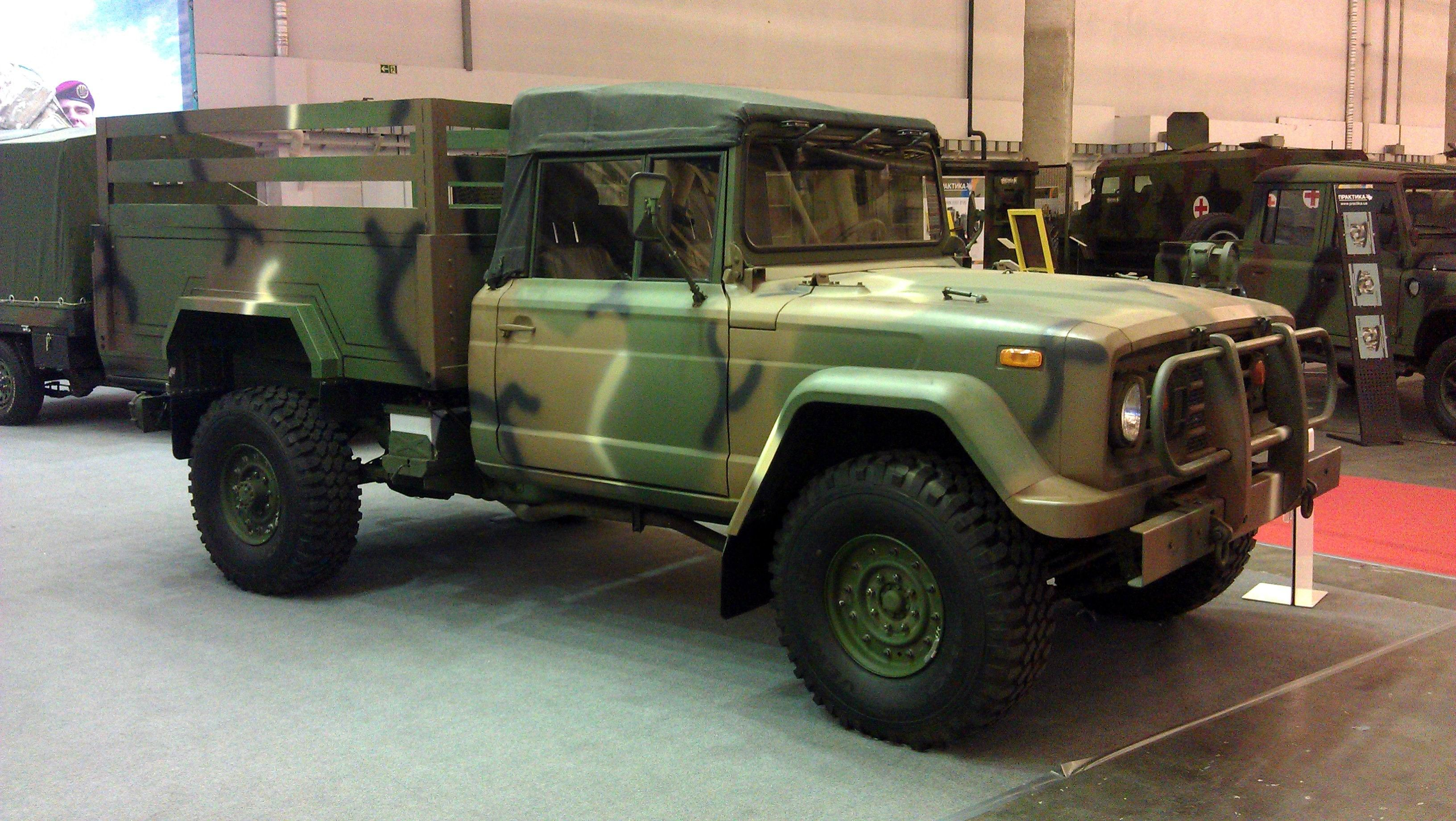
KIA KM450

The M715 family saw service in Vietnam, the Korean Demilitarized Zone (DMZ) and European bases.

The overhead-cam six-cylinder engines were not very reliable due to lack of knowledge on the overhead cam design and lack of maintenance. They had been dropped from civilian models by 1968. The M715 series also suffered from excessive oil consumption. The M715 vehicles that had front winches were dangerous in rough cross country use because the winch drive shaft would sometimes separate from the winch, the shaft would then foul the truck's steering, causing loss of control. The 1968 Models sent to Korea also had improperly welded frames causing the frame to break. This led to the vendor hiring a Korean company to repair several hundred trucks held in depot stocks. By 1970 most of the 1968 models in Korea were in cannibalization yards, being used as a source of parts, to keep the later model trucks running.

== Specifications ==
- Length: 209.75 in (5.33 m) without winch / 220.75 in (5.61 m) with winch
- Width: 85 in (2.16 m)
- Height:
  - At bed (with cargo cover installed) 87.7 in (2.23 m)
  - At cab 75 in (1.91 m), Reducible to 59 in (1.50 m)
- Weights:
  - Gross weight 8,400 lb (3,810 kg)
  - Payload 2,500 lb (1,130 kg) off-road / 3,000 lb (1,360 kg) on-road
  - Net weight 5,500 lb (2,490 kg) without winch / 6,000 lb (2,720 kg) with winch
- Engine: Inline 6-cyl, 230.5ci overhead camshaft Tornado
- Horsepower: 132.5 hp (98.8 kW)
- Transmission: Warner t-98 four-speed, synchronized manual
- Transfer case: New Process NP200 two-range, 1.91:1 low range
- Axles:
  - front: Dana 60
  - rear: Dana 70 full-floating
  - ratio: 5.87:1
- Electrical system: 24 volt utilizing two 12 volt batteries in series
- Brakes: Hydraulic, 4-wheeled drum
- Fuel type: gas
- Fuel capacity: 28 US gal (106 L; 23 imp gal)
- Top speed: 55 mph (89 km/h)
- Turning radius: 28 feet (9 m)
- Tires: 9.00 × 16 8-ply

== See also ==
- G-numbers
- List of weapons of the Lebanese Civil War
- Weapons of the Vietnam War
- K311 cargo truck
