= Mattie =

Mattie may refer to:

- Mattie (name), a list of people and fictional characters with the given name or nickname
- Mattie, Piedmont, Italy, a municipality
- Mattie, West Virginia, United States, a ghost town
- Grace Bailey (schooner), known as Mattie for many years

== See also ==
- Matty (disambiguation)
- Matti (disambiguation)
