= Maty =

Maty may refer to:

== People with the given name ==
- Maty Grunberg (born 1943), Israeli sculptor and writer
- Maty Mint Hamady (born 1967), Mauritanian economist and politician, current mayor of Nouakchott
- Maty Mauk (born 1993), American football quarterback
- Maty Noyes (born 1997), American singer-songwriter
- Maty Monfort, American actress and co-host of the 1990s talk show Mike and Maty

== People with the surname ==
- Matthew Maty (1716–1776), Dutch physician and writer
- Paul Henry Maty (1744–1787), British librarian

== See also ==
- Matey (disambiguation)
- Mati (disambiguation)
- Matty (disambiguation)
