= Matty (disambiguation) =

Matty Healy is an English singer-songwriter and record producer.

Matty may also refer to:

== People ==
- Matty (name), a list of people and fictional characters with the nickname, given name or surname
  - Matty Healy (born 1989), English singer-songwriter and musician
  - Matthew Tavares (born 1990), or Matty, a Canadian musician

== Places ==
- Matty, Hungary
- Matty Island, in the Canadian arctic
- Wuvulu Island, or Matty, Papua New Guinea

== Other uses ==
- Matthew Humberstone School, Lincolnshire, England, nicknamed Matty
- Matty (fabric), suitable for embroidery
- "Matty", a song by Christy Moore from the album Ordinary Man

== See also ==
- Maty (disambiguation)
- Mattie (disambiguation)
- Matti (disambiguation)
