= Matey =

Matey may refer to:

- Matey Kaziyski (born 1984), Bulgarian volleyball player
- Matey Mateev (1940–2010), Bulgarian theoretical physicist
- Matey Preobrazhenski (1828–1875), clerical name of Mono Petrov Seizmonov, Bulgarian Orthodox priest and revolutionary
- Yumsem Matey, Indian politician elected in 2009
- Malcolm "Matey" McDuck, a Disney character who is an ancestor of Scrooge McDuck and Donald Duck

== See also ==
- Maty (disambiguation)
- Metis (disambiguation), pronounced the same way
- M80 (disambiguation)
