= Jeep Gladiator (SJ) =

Series of Jeep pickup trucks

Jeep Pickup / Gladiator / J-series (SJ)
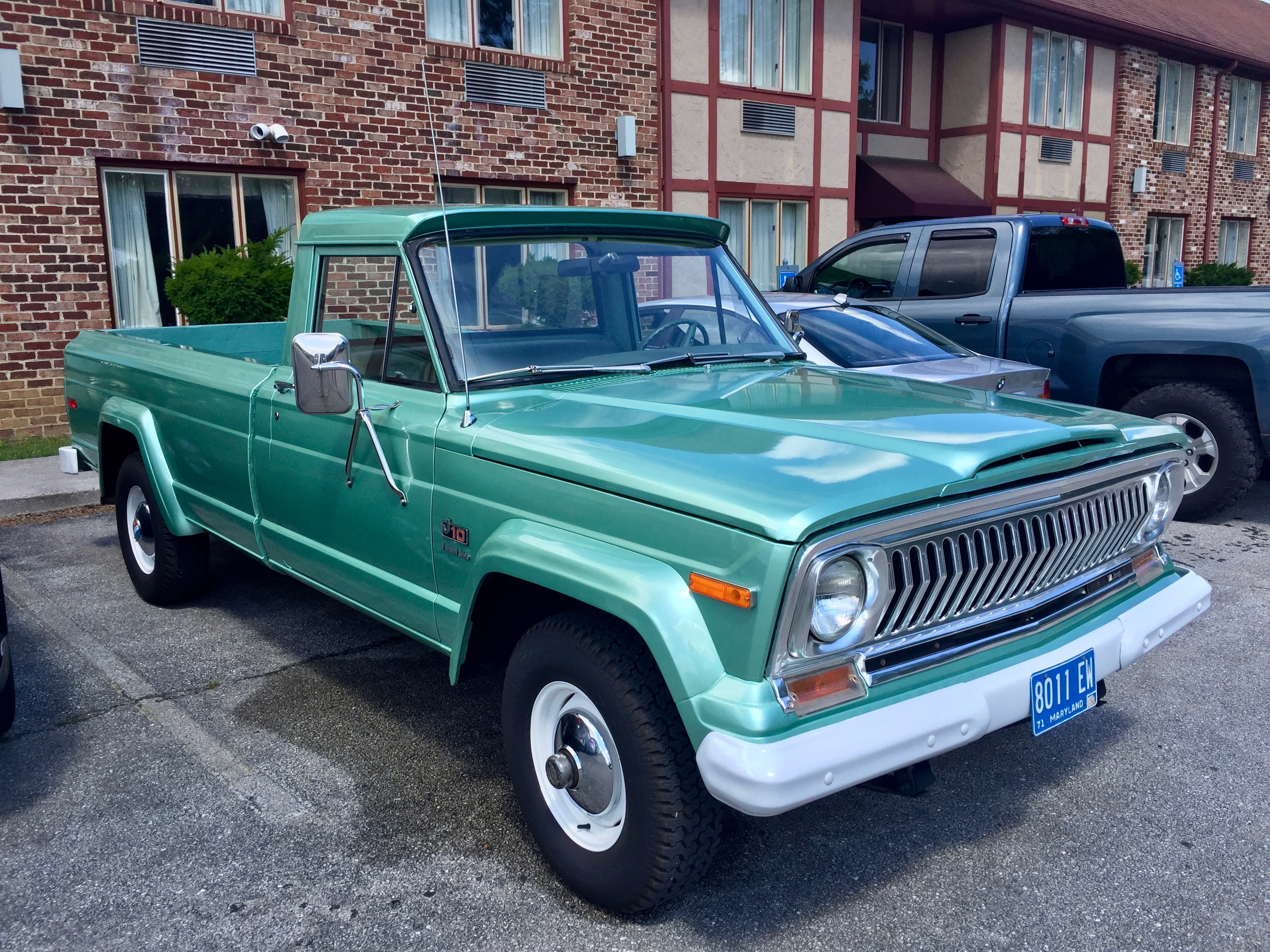
- 1974 Jeep J10 Pickup

Overview
- Manufacturer: Willys Motors (1962); Kaiser-Jeep (1963–1970); American Motors Corporation (1970–1987); Chrysler (1987–1988)
- Production: 1962–1988
- Assembly: United States: Toledo, Ohio (Toledo Complex); Argentina: Córdoba (IKA); Iran: Tehran (Pars Khodro: 1966–1981); Mexico: Mexico City (VAM)
- Designer: Brooks Stevens

Body and chassis
- Body style: 2-door pickup truck
- Layout: Front-engine, rear-wheel drive / four-wheel drive
- Related: Jeep Wagoneer (SJ); Jeep Cherokee (SJ)

Powertrain
- Engine: 230 cu in (3.8 L) Tornado I6; 232 cu in (3.8 L) AMC I6; 258 cu in (4.2 L) AMC I6; 327 cu in (5.4 L) AMC Vigilante V8; 350 cu in (5.7 L) Buick Dauntless V8; 360 cu in (5.9 L) AMC V8; 401 cu in (6.6 L) AMC V8
- Transmission: 3-speed manual; 4-speed manual; 3-speed GM THM400 automatic; 3-speed Chrysler A727 automatic

Dimensions
- Wheelbase: 120 in (3,048 mm); 126 in (3,200 mm); 132 in (3,353 mm); 165 in (4,191 mm) chassis camper

Chronology
- Predecessor: Willys Jeep Truck; Jeep Forward Control
- Successor: Jeep Comanche

The Jeep Gladiator, Jeep Pickup or J-series is a series of full-size pickup trucks based on the large Jeep SJ (Wagoneer) platform, which was built and sold under numerous marques from 1962 until 1988. The Jeep Gladiator/Pickup design is noteworthy for remaining in production for more than 26 years on a single automobile platform generation. The Gladiator was the basis of the first post-war U.S. Army trucks designed to be civilian vehicles and adapted to military use. Numerous versions of the Jeep pickup were built in other markets, including Mexico by Vehículos Automotores Mexicanos (VAM) and Argentina by Industrias Kaiser Argentina (IKA).

The Gladiator nameplate was revived on a midsize pickup truck based on the fourth-generation Jeep Wrangler (JL). It was unveiled at the Los Angeles Auto Show on November 28, 2018.

== Jeep pickup truck history ==
The original Jeep pickup truck was the Willys-Overland one-ton 4x4, also available in platform stake, chassis cab, or bare chassis versions, manufactured from 1947 until 1965. Several sizes of Forward Control pickup trucks with a cab-over design were manufactured by Kaiser from 1957 through 1966. The first Gladiator pickup trucks were developed by Kaiser in the early 1960s and were continued with improvements through the 1970s by American Motors Corporation (AMC) and also in international markets. The Gladiator-based Jeep SJ full-size pickup truck models, as well as the compact XJ-based Jeep Comanche pickups, were discontinued by Chrysler after acquiring AMC. Chrysler claimed capacity limitations to manufacture new Jeep pickup models. However, after over 25 years, Jeep reentered the pickup market using the Gladiator nameplate for a four-door midsize truck based on the Jeep Wrangler platform. The new Gladiator is in concept similar to the compact two-door Jeep CJ-8 (Scrambler), a long wheelbase version of the CJ-7 made from 1981 through 1986, but offering more amenities and features.

== Gladiator (1962–1971) ==
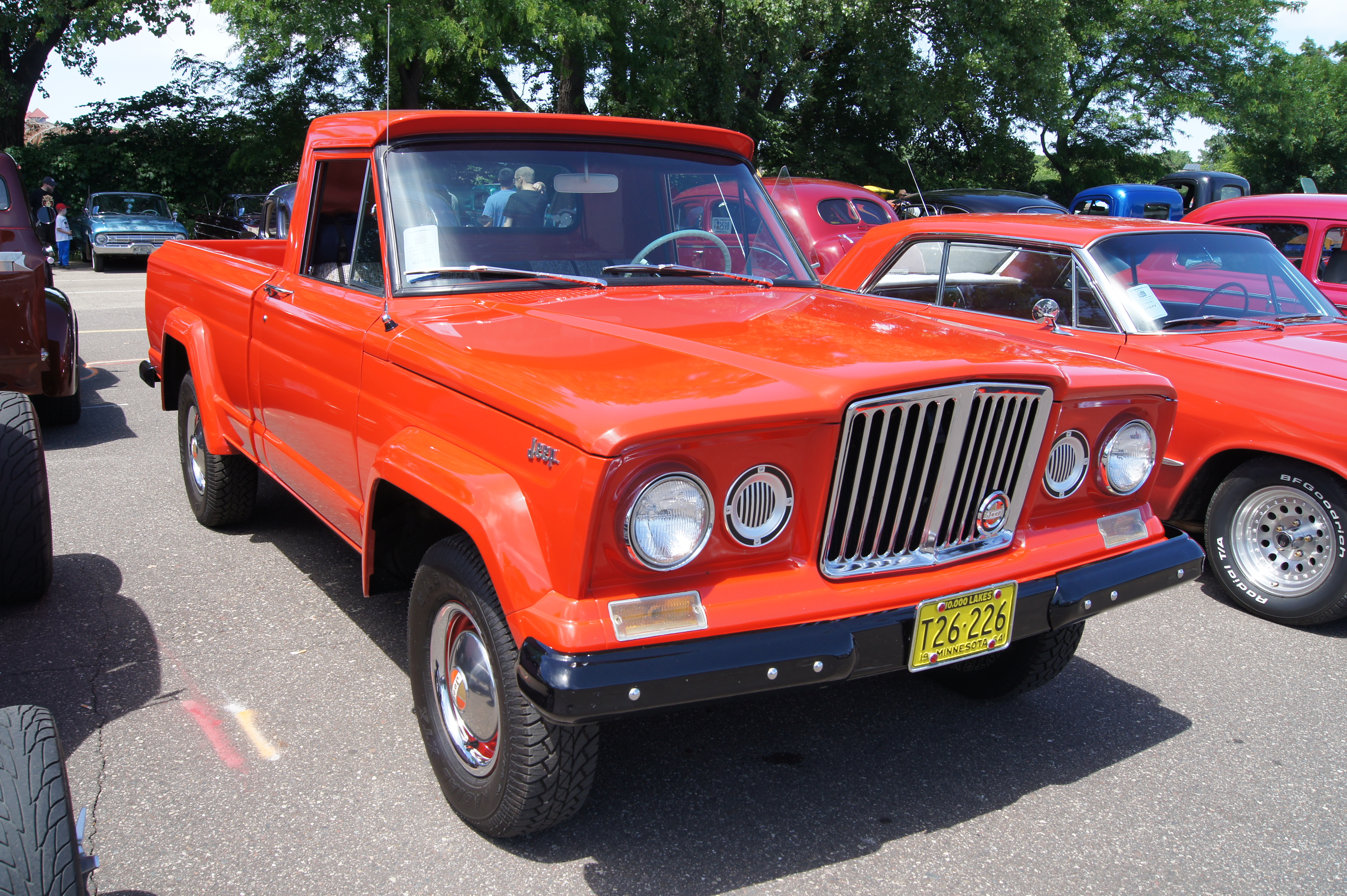
1964 short wheelbase Jeep Gladiator Townside

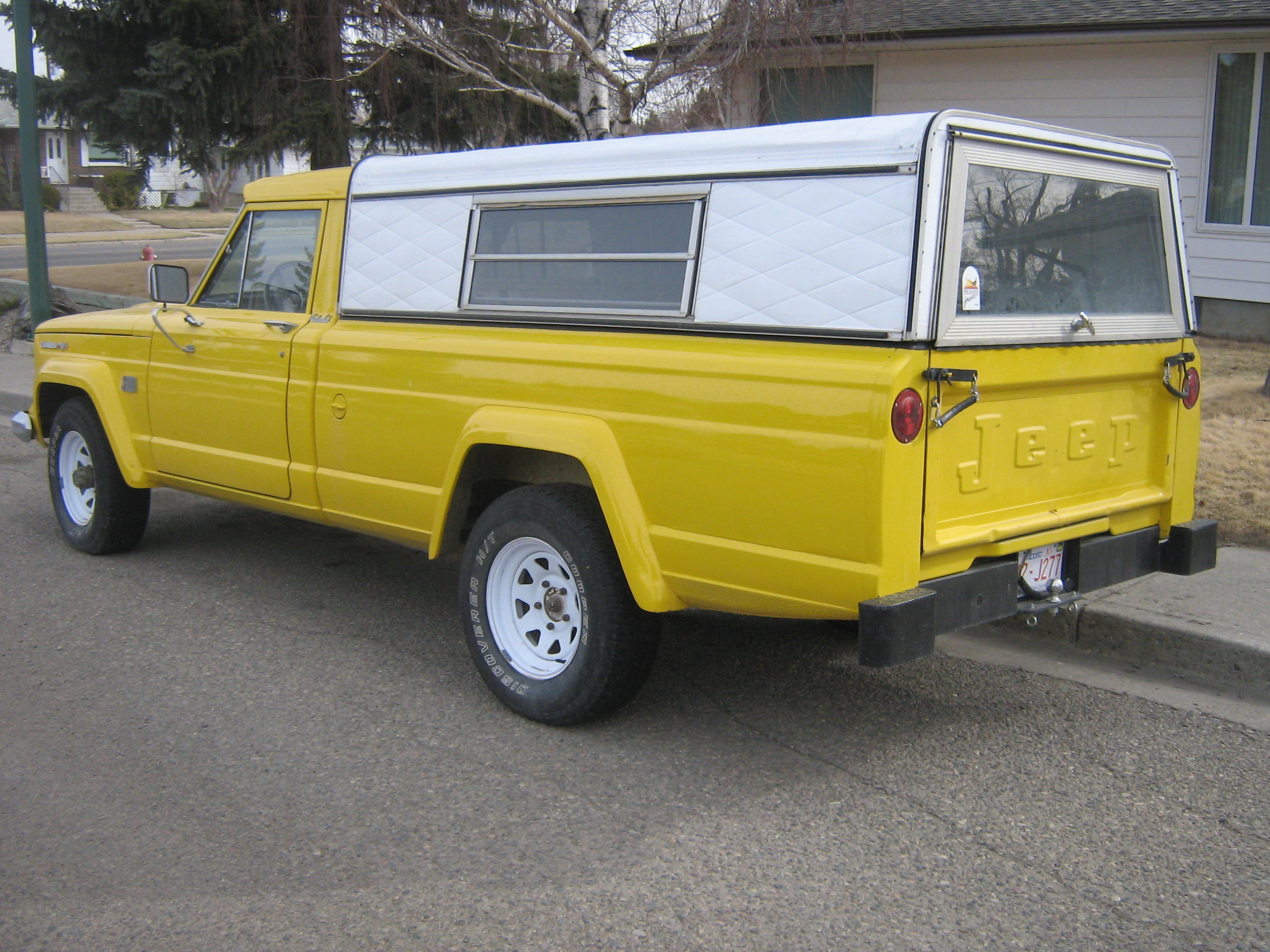
Long-wheelbase J300 with aftermarket cargo bed cap

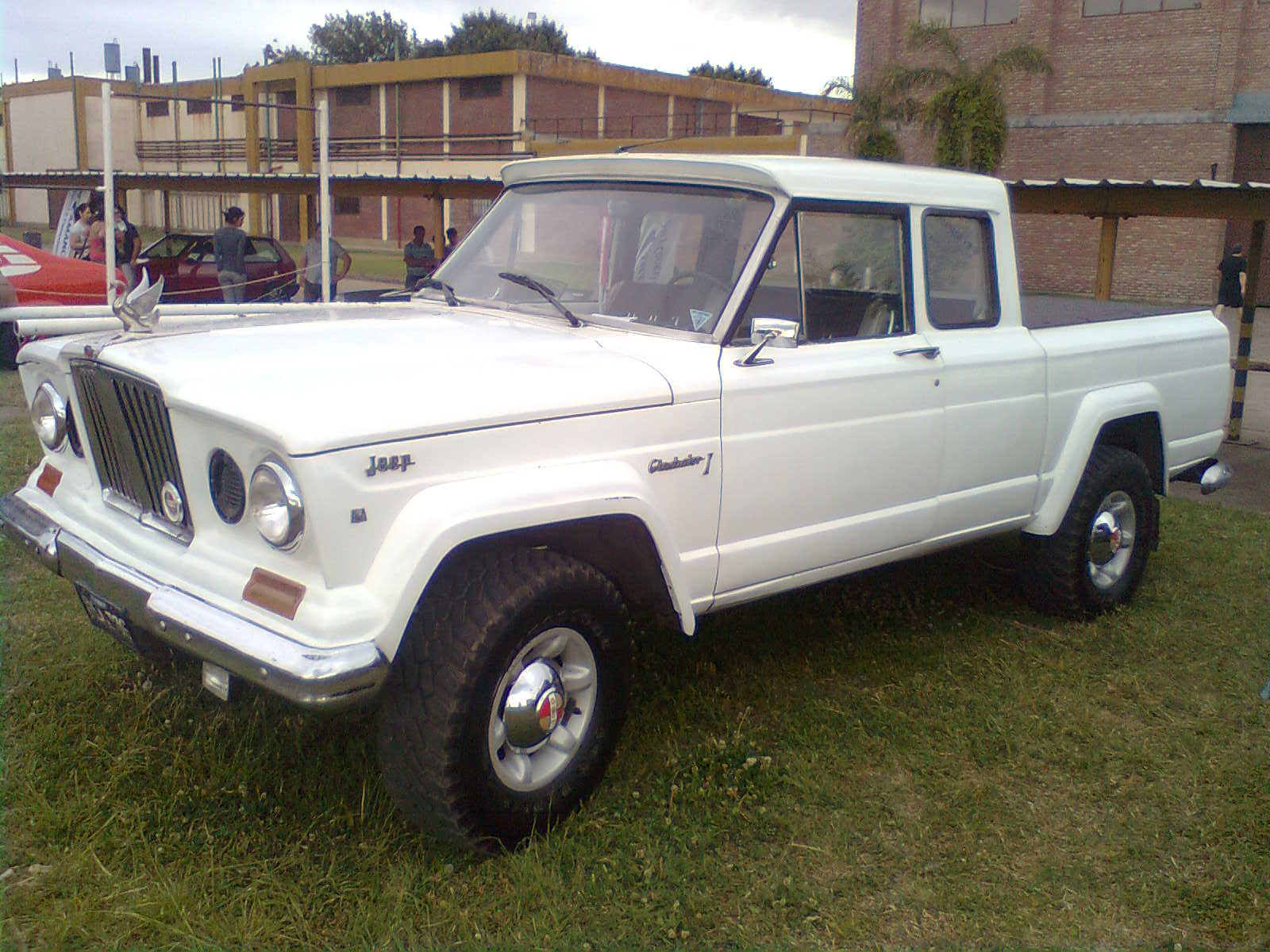
IKA Jeep Gladiator with extended cab

The first Jeep pickup development mule was operational around May 1960, about three months after the first station wagon-type development vehicle. Introduced in 1962 for the 1963 model year, the Gladiator was a conventional body-on-frame pickup design that shared its basic frame architecture and front end with the Jeep Wagoneer four-wheel-drive station wagon.

Gladiators were available in RWD and 4WD, with optional dual rear wheels. A remarkable innovation was the available independent front suspension (IFS) instead of a solid front axle on the 4WD half-ton Gladiator trucks. It was a simple IFS design with a Dana 44 center section, that proved troublesome, did not sell well, and the option was deleted in 1965.

Gladiator trucks were also available as cab and chassis, wrecker, stake bed, and with chassis-mounted campers with extended wheelbases. The load bed options were Townside, Thriftside (a conventional bed, similar to a Ford "Flareside" or Chevrolet "Stepside"), and flat stake bed, with up to 8,600 lb (3,901 kg) G.V.W. and almost two-ton payload capacity.

A new overhead cam Jeep Tornado engine 230 cu in (3.8 L) straight-six producing 140 hp (104 kW; 142 PS) was standard. It was the first production overhead cam engine in an American light truck or SUV and one of the first OHC engines offered by an American manufacturer.

Further innovations for four-wheel-drive pickups included optional automatic transmission (an industry first), as well as power brakes, power steering, and, just like early post-war Jeeps, a power take-off for numerous accessories that included snow plows and push plates.

In early 1963, Willys Motors changed its name to Kaiser Jeep Corporation.

During 1965 the 327 cu in (5.4 L) AMC V8 engine became available. It produced 250 hp (186 kW; 253 PS) and 340 pound force-feet (461 N⋅m) of torque at 2600 rpm. The standard Tornado engine was replaced by American Motors' 232 cu in (3.8 L) OHV inline six.

In 1967 all (RWD) two-wheel drive versions, except for the J-100 panel delivery, were dropped due to poor sales.

For 1968, the flared-fender Thriftside models were dropped while a new camper option was added for the J-3600. From 1968 to 1971 Jeep pickups offered the Buick 350 cu in (5.7 L) 230 hp (172 kW; 233 PS) Dauntless V8 as an optional engine.

American Motors Corporation (AMC) purchased the Kaiser Jeep operations in 1970 when Kaiser Industries decided to leave the automobile business. The Jeep trucks moved to all AMC engines to improve performance and standardize production and servicing. The Buick engine was replaced by the 360 cu in (5.9 L) or 401 cu in (6.6 L) AMC V8s.

In 1970, the Gladiator's front grille was changed to the same design as the Jeep Wagoneer SUV. This was the truck's first styling change since its introduction. An AMC badge was also added to the grille after 1972.

== Jeep pickup (1971–1988) ==
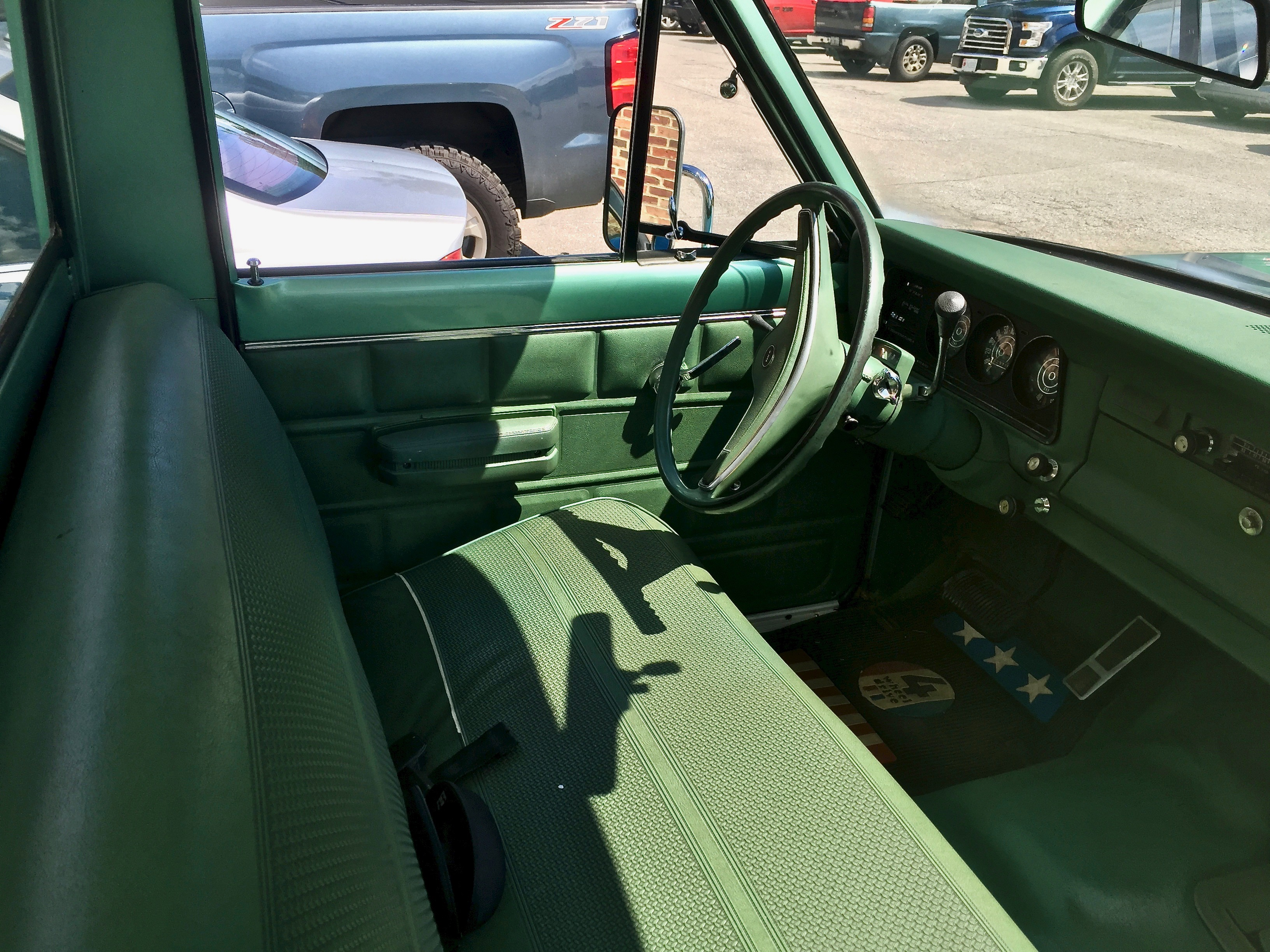
1974 Jeep J10 interior

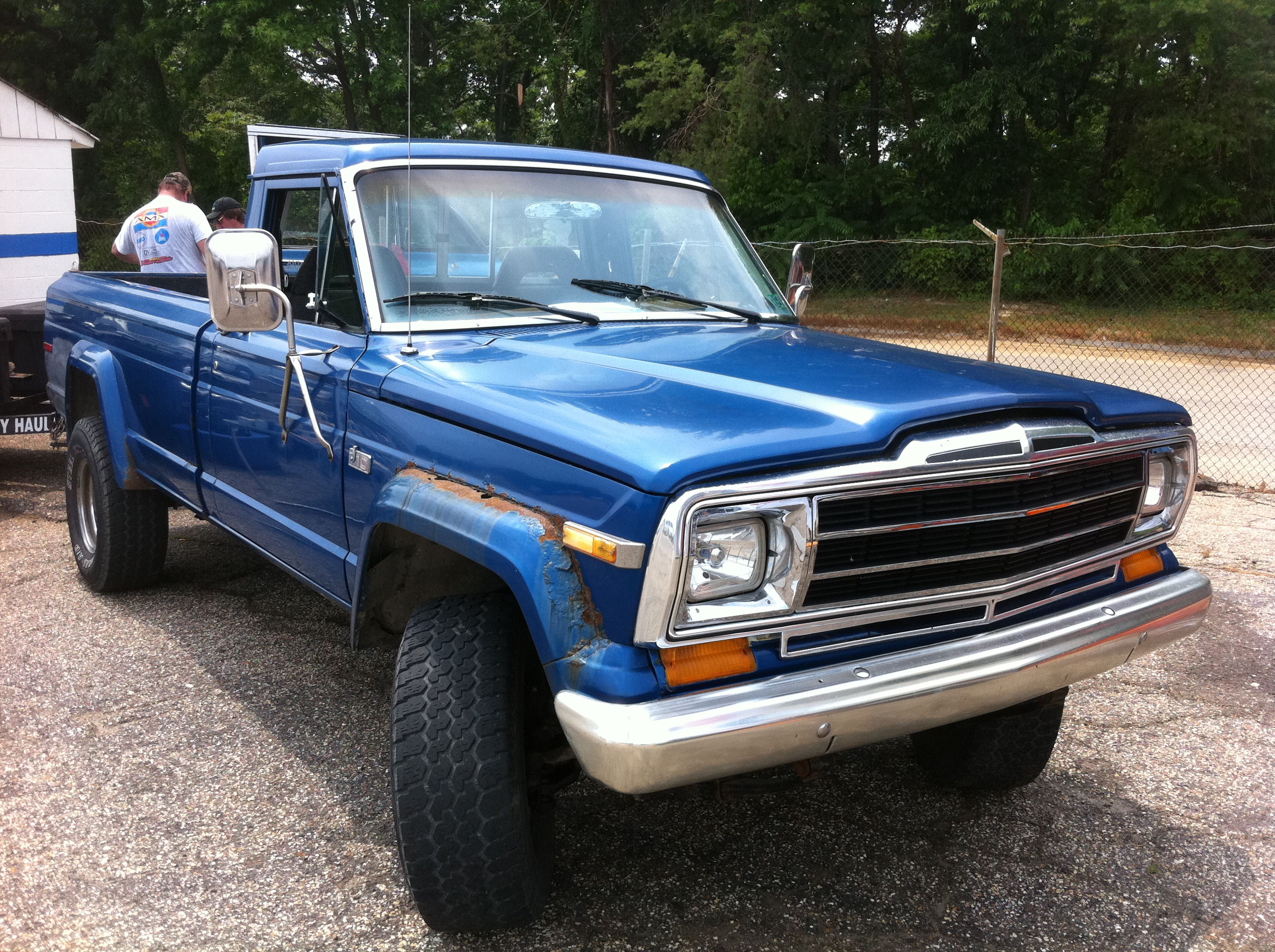
Jeep J10 pickup

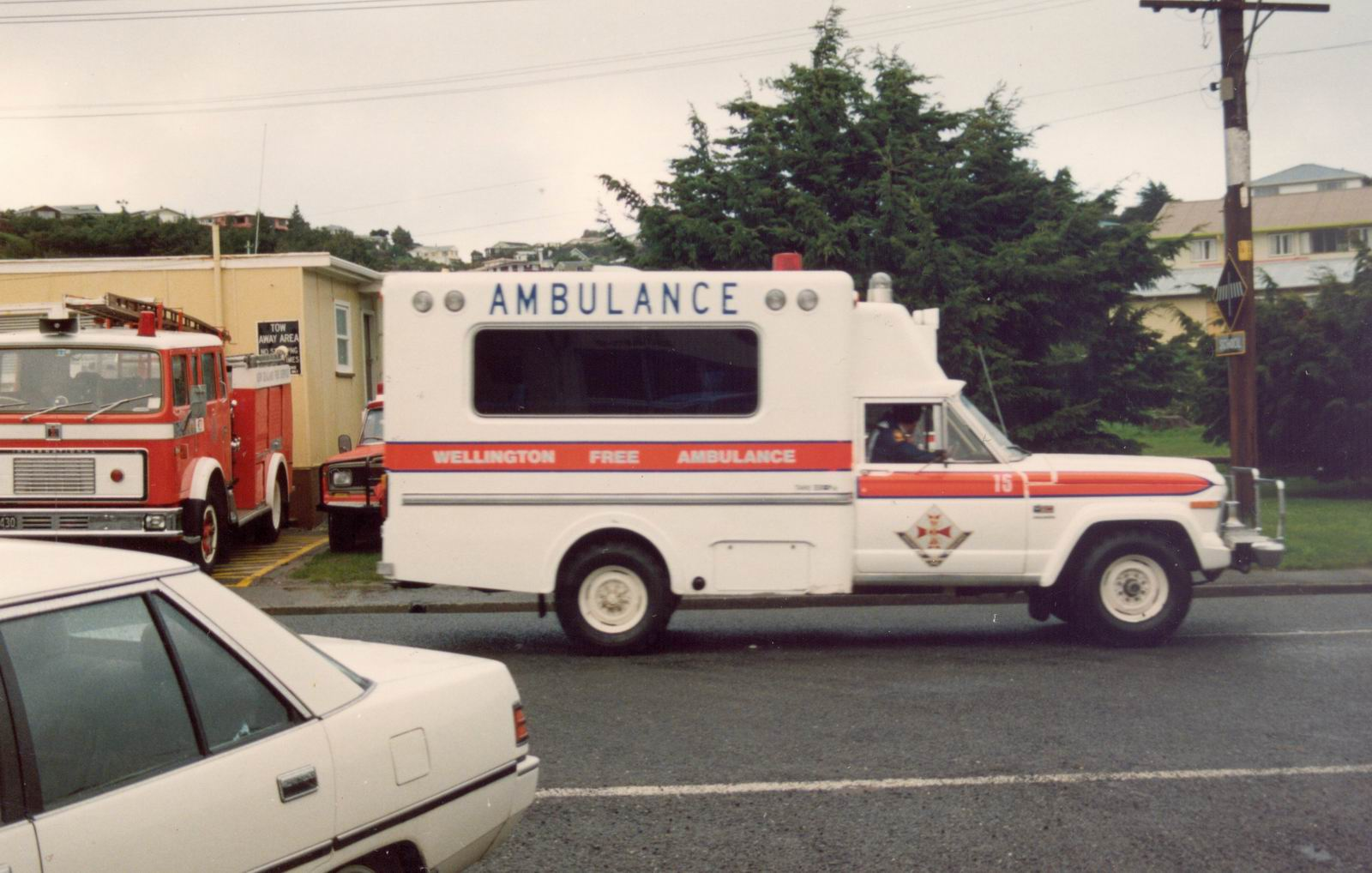
J20-based Ambulance built like a chassis-camper (New Zealand)

The Gladiator name was dropped after 1972, after which the line was known simply as the Jeep pickup or J-series. The pickups were designated as J2000 and J4000 models (the 3000 series was dropped in 1971) until 1973, then as J10 and J20 models from 1974 to 1988.

From 1971 to 1972 Jeep pickups offered the AMC 304 cu in (5.0 L) 210 hp (157 kW; 213 PS) V8 as an optional engine.

The AMC 258 cu in (4.2 L) I6 engine was introduced in 1972 and offered through 1988. The engine produced 112 hp (84 kW; 114 PS) and 210 lb⋅ft (285 N⋅m) of torque.

The AMC 360 cu in (5.9L) was offered in 1971 and through 1988. Producing in early versions 175 hp (130 kW; 177 PS) and 245 lb⋅ft (332 N⋅m) of torque. Later 360s produced 195 hp (145 kW; 198 PS) and 295 lb⋅ft (400 N⋅m) of torque.

Throughout 1971-1972, the J10 received updates to its front-end design, which "modernized" the vehicle.

The model designations were simplified for 1974, with the J-2000 and the J-4000, which designate wheelbase, being swapped out for the J-10 and J-20, designating payload capacity. Larger brakes were made standard, and the turning radius was reduced. The Quadra-Trac system was now available with all engines.

The AMC 401 cu in (6.6 L) was offered from 1974 through 1978. These engines are known for their toughness and excellent power output. The 401 engine produced 330 hp (246 kW; 335 PS) and 430 lb⋅ft (583 N⋅m) of torque.

For 1977, Jeep J-10 pickups included Dana's manual four-wheel-drive system, a more powerful 258 cu in (4.2 L) six-cylinder engine, and heavier axle tubes, while power front disc brakes became standard equipment and the considerably greater gross vehicle weight rating (GWV) capacity J-20s included AMC's 360 cu in (5.9 L) V8 engine. The 401 cu in (6.6 L) engine was optional, as well as full-time Quadra-Trac and both automatic and manual transmissions.

1983 saw the new full-time four-wheel drive system, Selec-Trac, replace Quadra-Trac.

From 1981 to 1985, a re-bodied version of the J-10 was built and sold as the Jeep CJ-10, featuring a CJ-like nose and cab, as well as a very boxy redesigned rear truck-bed, somewhat resembling that of a Land-Rover.

Chrysler bought out AMC in 1987. The full-size Jeep Pickup line was not only an aging model, but also competed directly with the broader range of Dodge trucks. Chrysler discontinued the full-size Jeep trucks, but continued to build the luxurious and highly profitable Grand Wagoneer, which shared the chassis with the large pickups.

== Military versions ==
Military versions of the civilian Jeep pickup included the M715 and M725, built from 1967 to 1969. They were built under contract for nations in addition to the United States. The idea was to reduce costs by starting from a civilian truck and sharing parts with the normal production-line truck, like the later "Commercial Utility Cargo Vehicle" (CUCV) for the military as a 5/4 ton tactical vehicle.

The Swedish Air Force acquired 450 Gladiator vehicles in the early 1980s. They were given the local designations Klargöringsbil 9711 and Klargöringsbil 9712, with the latter variant being equipped with a hard cargo bed top. The vehicles were modified to be used by aircraft groundcrew for mobile flight line operations in the Swedish Bas 90 system and could carry trailers with equipment and tow aircraft. It is often informally referred to as "The Dallas Jeep".

The Lebanese Armed Forces acquired many M715 and Gladiator SJ versions in the early 1970s, which saw extensive use during the Lebanese Civil War (1975–1990). Many of these vehicles fell into the hands of the various competing Lebanese militias, who either used them for logistical and transport operations or modified them to be used as technicals, fitted with heavy machine guns or anti-aircraft autocannons.

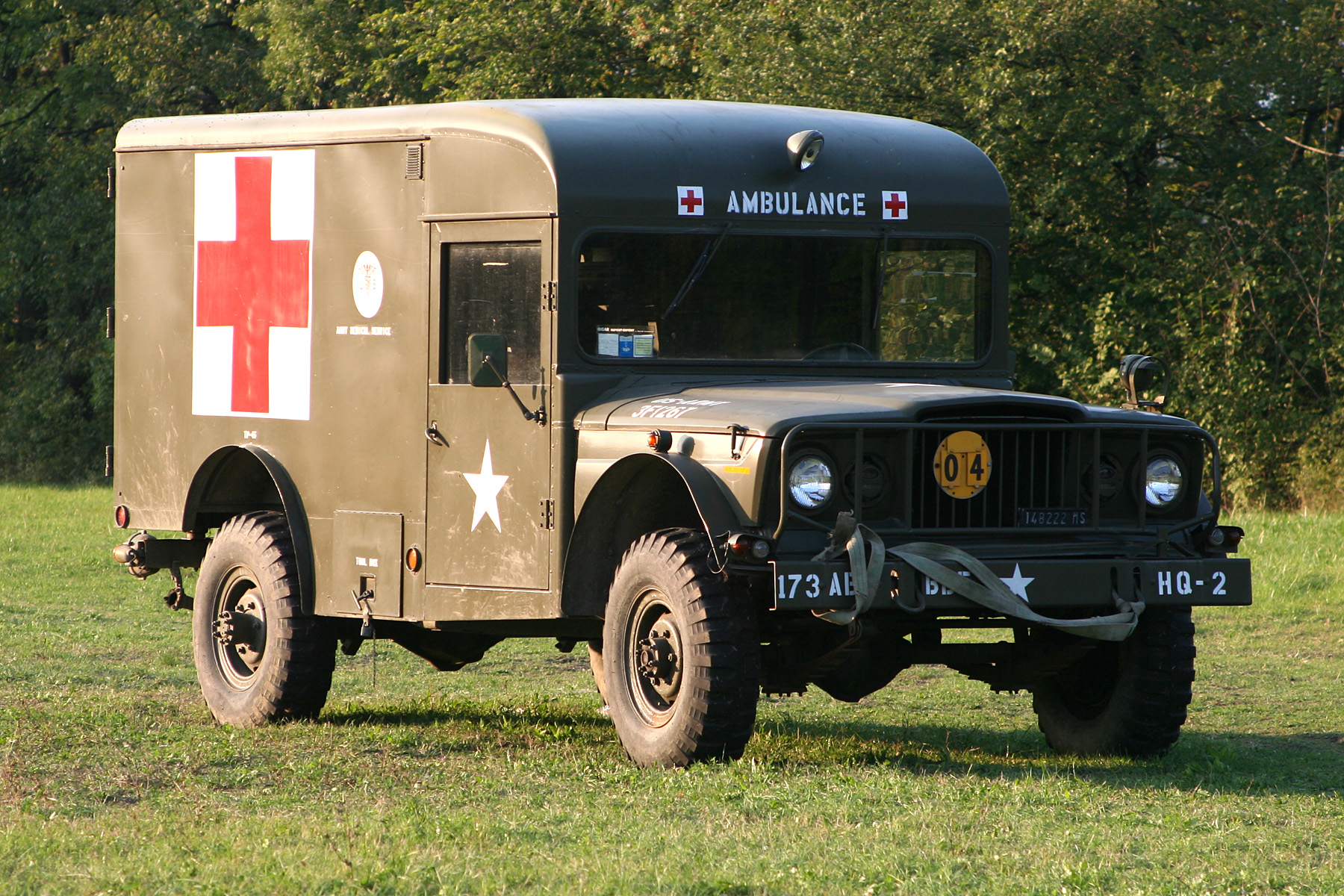
U.S. military M725 ambulance

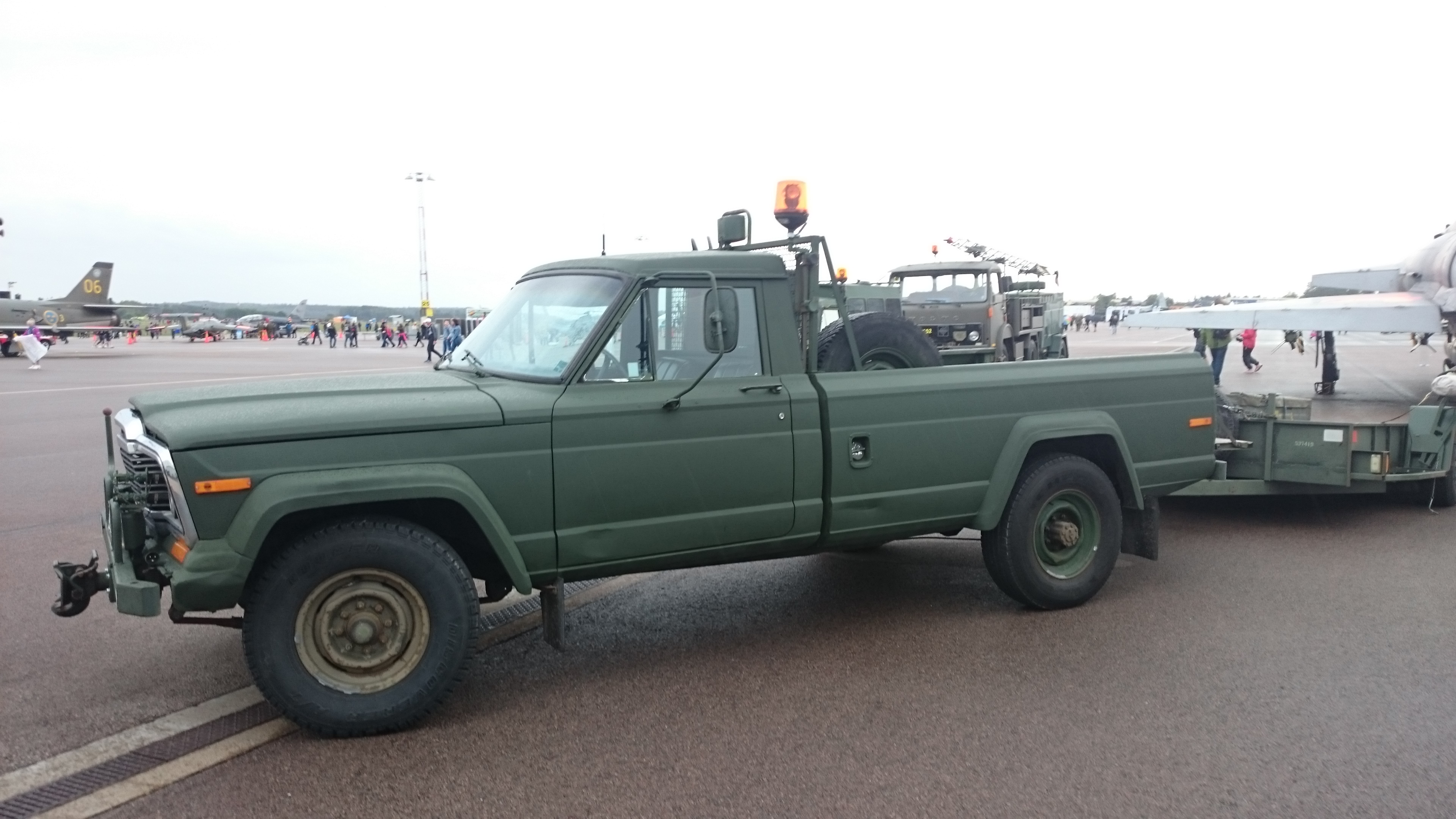
Klargöringsbil 9711 of the Swedish Air Force

== Trim packages ==
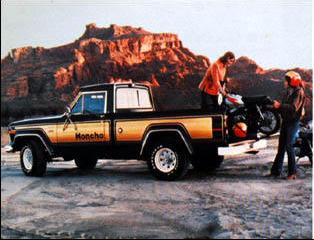
Jeep J10 Honcho

From 1975, Jeep tried making their pickups more "car-like" and appealing to consumers, starting with the Pioneer package, featuring a fancier interior, woodgrain interior and exterior trim, chromed front bumpers, window moldings, and wheel covers, dual horns, and other “car” features.

From 1976 to 1983, the "Honcho" trim package was offered on the J10 pickup. It consisted of bold striping with decals and was offered with factory extras such as the Levi's interior or a roll bar. The content of the Honcho package varied from year to year, but "always included the wide-track look of the Cherokee Chief."

The Honcho was one in a series of special decal packages offered for J-Series trucks in the mid to late 1970s, which included the 1977–1979 Golden Eagle and the 1978 "10-4" version which offered an optional Citizens' Band radio along with the decals. The Honcho package was only available on the sportside (stepside) and short-bed trucks. Between 1974 and 1983, an unknown number of Honchos were produced, but the Sportside Honchos were made between 1980 and 1983, and only 1264 of these trucks were ever made.

Decal packages were available for many of Jeep's vehicles in the 1970s, including a package for the Jeep Cherokee called the Cherokee Chief. The Golden Eagle package was also available for both the CJ and the Cherokee.

The 1980 (1981 model year) Laredo package was perhaps the most luxurious one, including leather bucket seats, a leather-wrapped steering wheel, chrome interior trim, and a state-of-the-art Alpine sound system.

== Jeep truck concepts ==
Jeep has shown numerous concept pickup trucks, and officials at the automaker have "expressed interest in putting such a vehicle into production."

=== 2003 small pickup truck ===
A production-ready version of a Jeep Scrambler pickup was shown in 2003 at the North American Dealers Association, but was pulled after a few hours. According to Motor Trend, there might be a "production Jeep pickup truck in the works".

=== 2005 Jeep Gladiator ===
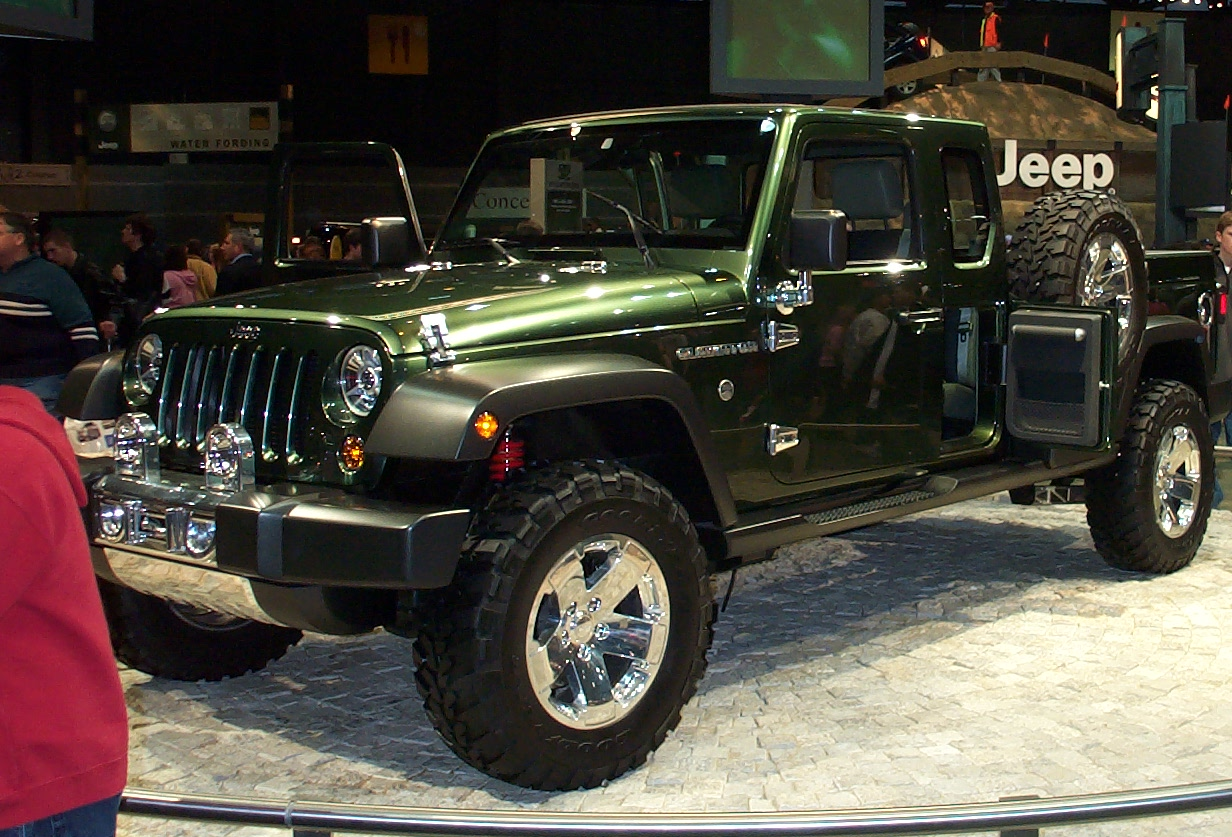
Jeep Gladiator at the 2005 Chicago Auto Show

In late 2004, a new Jeep Gladiator concept was introduced. While not officially intended to be sold, it was used as a demonstration "that a Jeep pickup was in the dark recesses of DaimlerChrysler's brain trust".

The Gladiator concept features an open-air canvas roof, fold-down windshield, removable doors, and an expandable truck bed. The Gladiator has a 2.8-liter, 4-cylinder common-rail turbo diesel engine that provides 165 hp (123 kW; 167 PS) and 295 lb⋅ft (400 N⋅m) of torque. The truck has a 6-speed manual transmission. Ground clearance is 13.7 in (348 mm), with a break-over angle of 23.2°, an approach angle of 47.6° and departure angle of 38.0°. Front and rear tires are 34 in (864 mm) and are mounted on 18x8-inch wheels. The Jeep Gladiator has a 1,500-pound (680 kg) payload.

A "midgate" made the concept Gladiator truck closer to an imitation of the Chevrolet Avalanche, "than an attempt to revive its namesake's glory."

The 2005 Gladiator Concept was also a preview of the all-new 2007 Jeep Wrangler (JK) and Jeep Wrangler (JK) Unlimited. These featured nearly identical exterior and interior styling to the production model of the 2007-2017 Jeep Wrangler (JK).

=== 2012 Jeep J12 ===
In March, Jeep announced a new concept at the Easter Jeep Safari in Moab, Utah. The J-12 is based on a modified Wrangler Unlimited chassis with a 18-inch (457 mm) frame extension allowing the use of a 6-foot (1,829 mm) load bed. The styling resembles the classic 1960s-era Jeep Gladiator truck and features "old-school" 16-inch smooth steel wheels with 36-inch tires, as well as a full bench seat in the cab.

=== 2016 Jeep Crew Chief 715 ===
At the 2016 Jeep Safari in Moab, Utah, Jeep revealed seven new concepts including a Crew Chief 715 pickup with four-doors and a 5-foot cargo bed. The design was inspired by the Kaiser Jeep M715 military vehicle from the late 1960s that was based on the regular civilian production Jeep Gladiator pickup. The Jeep Crew Chief concept rides on 20-inch beadlock wheels, and 40-inch military tires, but is mostly based on a Wrangler Unlimited stretched to a 139 in (3,531 mm) wheelbase.

== See also ==
- List of weapons of the Lebanese Civil War
- List of weapons of the Rhodesian Bush War
- Republic of Vietnam National Police Field Force
- Weapons of the Vietnam War
