= M80 =

M80 or M-80 may refer to:

== Military ==
- BVP M-80, a Yugoslav military vehicle
- M80, a U.S. military type of the 7.62×51mm NATO rifle cartridge
- M80, training version of the M19 mine
- M80 Stiletto, a 2006 prototype naval vessel
- M80 Zolja, a Yugoslav anti-tank rocket launcher
- Zastava M80, an assault rifle

== Transportation ==
- M-80 (Michigan highway), a state highway in the Upper Peninsula of Michigan
- M80 motorway, a motorway in Scotland
- M80 Ring Road (aka Western Ring Road and Metropolitan Ring Road), a freeway in Melbourne, Australia

== Other uses ==
- M-80 (band), an American punk band
- M-80 (explosive), a large firecracker
- M80 Radio, a radio station from Portugal and Spain
- Monster M-80, a tropical juice energy drink
- M 80, an age group for Masters athletics (athletes aged 35+)
- M80/2, the vehicle used on the M-Bahn in Berlin, Germany
- Messier 80, a globular cluster in the constellation Scorpius
- Microsoft MACRO-80, a macro assembler
- M-80, a minor Hydra-affiliated character in Marvel Comics

== See also ==
- Model 80 (disambiguation)
- Matey (disambiguation)
- Mighty (disambiguation)
