= Sarsar-2 =

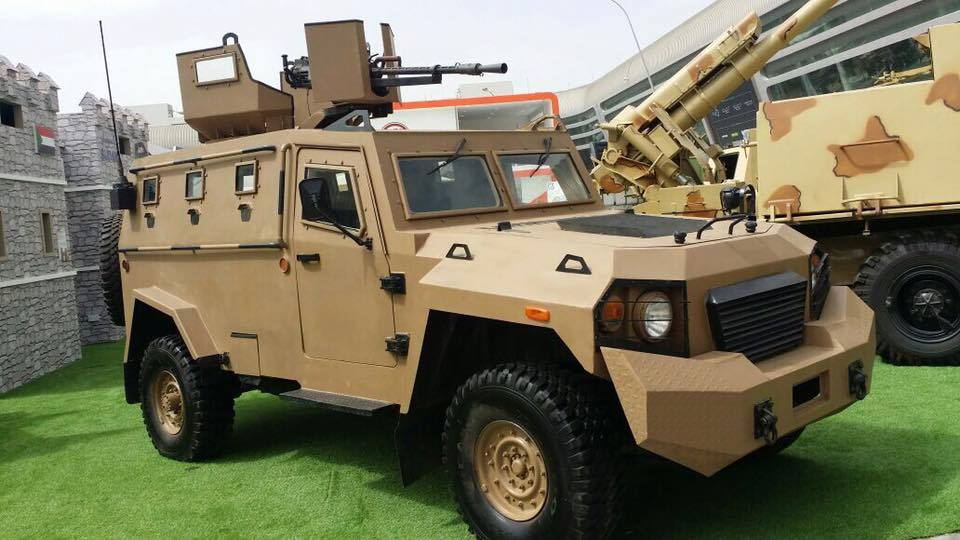
- Sarsar 4x4 armed vehicle at IDEX
- Type: Infantry Armed Vehicle
- Place of origin: Sudan

Service history
- In service: 2016–present
- Used by: Sudanese Armed Forces

Production history
- Manufacturer: Military Industry Corporation

Specifications
- Mass: 5.5 t (5,500 kg)
- Crew: 11
- Engine: Model D4DA Type 4 cylinder in-line diesel 139 hp
- Maximum speed: 80 km/h

Sarsar-2 is a Sudanese armoured personnel carrier (APC) manufactured and designed by the state-run Military Industry Corporation for use in the Sudanese Armed Forces.

== Design ==
The Sarsar-2 base model uses a license-made Kia truck chassis, and was primarily designed for reconnaissance purposes. Alongside this, the base model also has a capacity of 11 passengers, CEN-level protection for 2xDM51 grenades and has a maximum road speed of 80 km/h.

The Sarsar-2 has a combat weight of 5500 kilograms, whilst when unloaded, will have a weight of 4700 kilograms. The length of the Sarsar-2 is 5150mm, whilst its width and height are 1782 and 2600mm respectively, with the latter also including the mounted turret.

== Operators ==
- Sudan - In use with the Sudanese Armed Forces.
