= Mattie, West Virginia =

Mattie
- Ghost town
- Location within the state of West Virginia
- Coordinates: 38°36′33″N 81°28′10″W
- Country: United States
- State: West Virginia
- County: Roane
- Elevation: 1,076 ft (328 m)
- Time zone: UTC-5 (Eastern (EST))
  - Summer (DST): UTC-4 (EDT)
- GNIS ID: 1740941

Mattie is an extinct town in Roane County, West Virginia.

The town was named after Mattie Hunt, the child of an early postmaster.
