= Chevrolet Silverado =

Range of full-size trucks by General Motors

Chevrolet Silverado/GMC Sierra
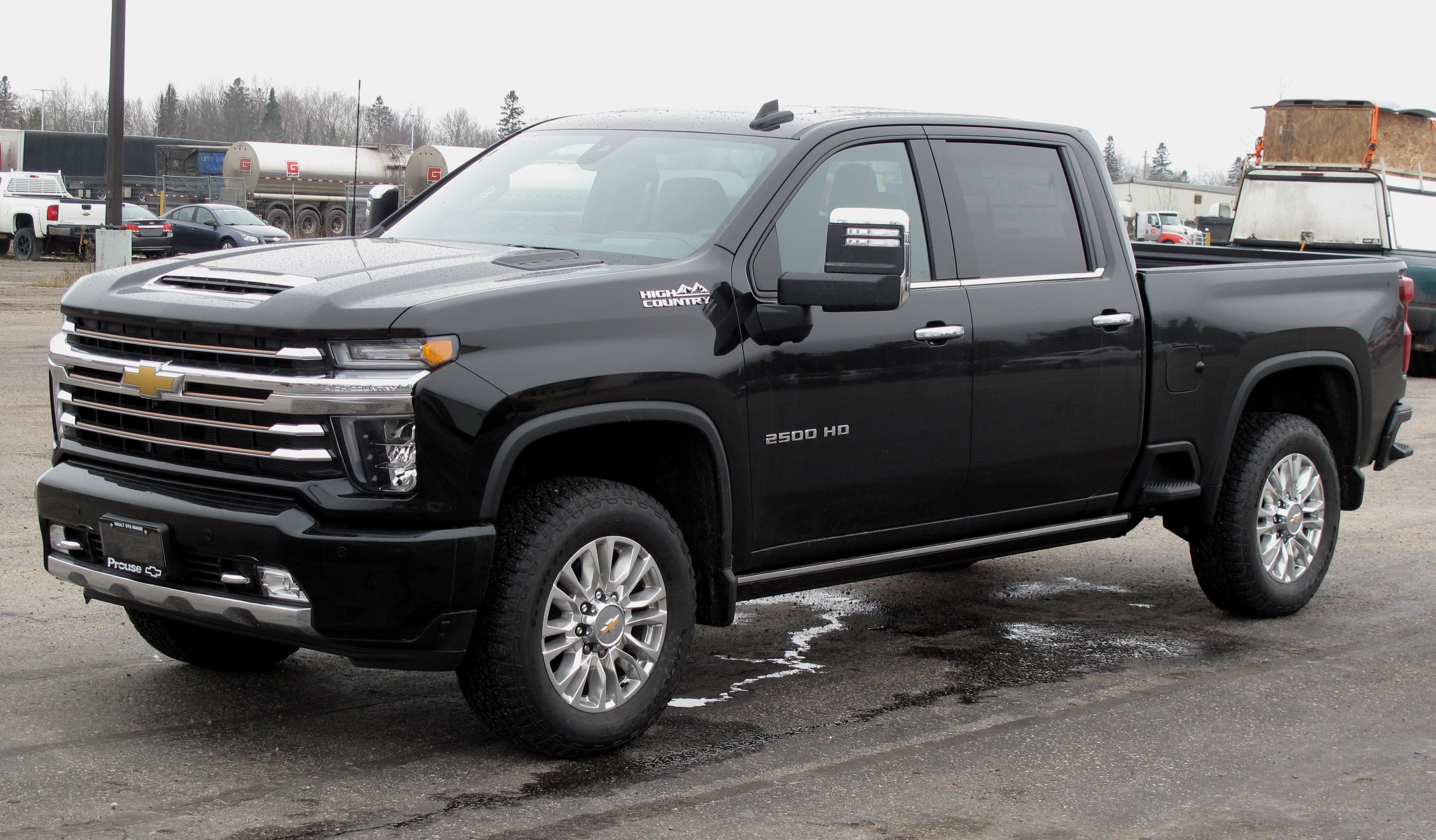
- 2022 Silverado 2500HD High Country

Overview
- Manufacturer: General Motors
- Also called: Chevrolet Cheyenne (Mexico); International CV; GMC Sierra
- Production: 1998–present
- Assembly: United States: Flint, Michigan; Pontiac, Michigan (Pontiac East Assembly); Roanoke, Indiana (Fort Wayne Assembly); Springfield, Ohio (Medium Duty); Canada: Oshawa, Ontario; Mexico: Silao, Guanajuato

Body and chassis
- Class: Full-size pickup truck; Heavy-duty pickup truck; Medium-duty chassis cab truck
- Body style: 2-door regular cab (1999–present); 3-door extended cab (1999–2000 1500 and 2500 only); 4-door extended cab (2000–2014); 4-door crew cab (2001–present for HD; 2004–present for 1500)
- Layout: Front-engine, rear-wheel-drive; Front-engine, four-wheel-drive

Chronology
- Predecessor: Chevrolet/GMC C/K; International D series/International TerraStar (for International CV, Chevrolet Kodiak/GMC TopKick (for Silverado Medium Duty)

The Chevrolet Silverado is a range of trucks manufactured by General Motors under the Chevrolet brand. Introduced for the 1999 model year, the Silverado is the successor to the long-running Chevrolet C/K model line. Taking its name from the top trim level from the Chevrolet C/K series, the Silverado is offered as a series of full-size pickup trucks, chassis cab trucks, and medium-duty trucks. The fourth generation of the model line was introduced for the 2019 model year.

The Chevrolet Silverado shares mechanical commonality with the identically related GMC Sierra; GMC ended the use of the C/K nomenclature a model generation prior to Chevrolet. In Mexico, high-trim level versions of the Silverado use the Chevrolet Cheyenne name (not to be confused with the 2003 concept) starting with the LT trim; Work Truck and "Custom" trims are still called Silverado. The Silverado is among the best-selling vehicles in the United States, having sold over 12 million trucks since its introduction in 1998.

== History ==
The Silverado nameplate made its debut for the 1975 model year, becoming the top trim level on all Chevrolet C/K trucks, slotted above Custom Deluxe, Scottsdale, and Cheyenne. For the 1968 model year (seven years before the Silverado), GMC C/K trucks used variations of the Sierra name (Sierra, Sierra Classic, Sierra Grande, and High Sierra). Even after the C/K series officially ended, GM still uses the CK and the CC in their current model codes, to denote a two-wheel drive (CC), and four-wheel drive (CK).

For the 1988 GMT400 model architecture, Chevrolet retained the C/K model nomenclature, with GMC branding its full-size line as Sierras. While sharing the same body and chassis, the model chronology of the Silverado and Sierra are different, with five generations of the Sierra, while four of the Silverado.

In 2018, at the NTEA Work Truck Show in Indianapolis, Indiana, Chevrolet unveiled the first medium-duty Silverado, expanding the model line to a 4500HD, 5500HD, and 6500HD chassis cab. Largely the successor to the 2003–2009 GMT560 chassis, the medium-duty trucks are exclusive to Chevrolet, with no plans for an equivalent GMC version. Instead, Navistar International (now partnering with GM) would sell the medium-duty trucks as a rebadged counterpart, called the CV. This is in fact a very similar nod to how the Avalanche did not have a GMC Yukon–based equivalent, but instead, Cadillac would take its place as the former's rebadged counterpart, the Cadillac Escalade EXT.

== First-generation Silverado / second-generation Sierra (GMT800; 1999) ==
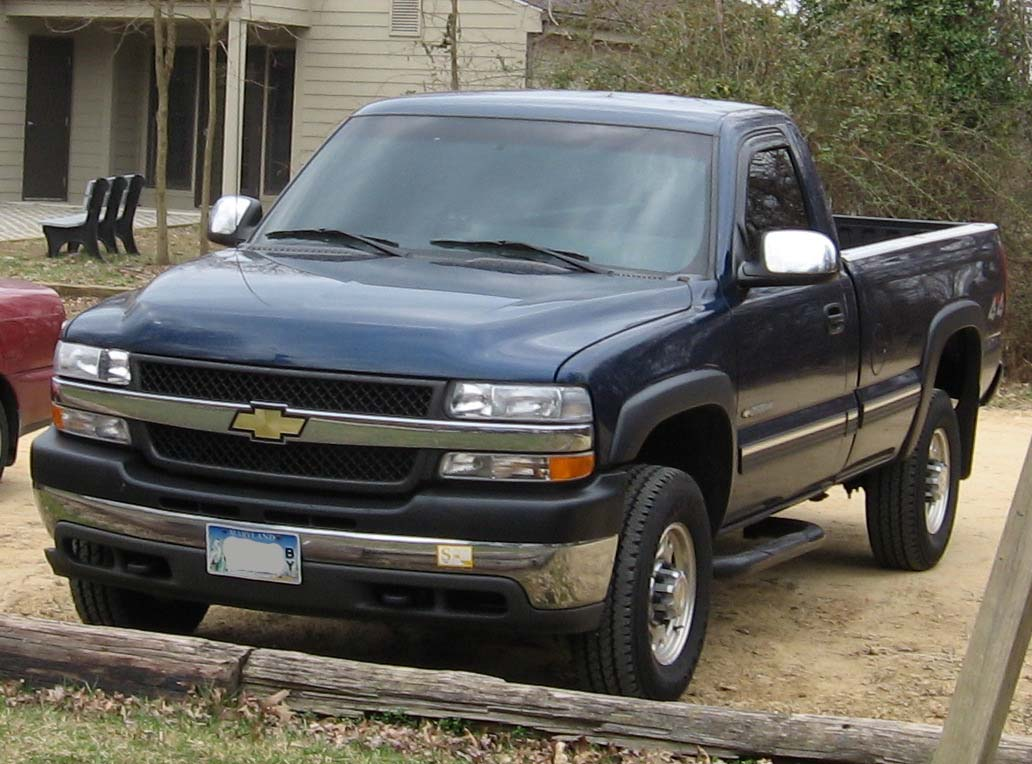
First-generation Chevrolet Silverado 2500HD (2001–02 Regular Cab)

The GMT800 Silverado/Sierra 1500 and 2500 pickup trucks were released in August 1998 as 1999 models. The "classic" light-duty GMT400 C/K trucks continued to be produced for the first two years alongside the new models, and the Heavy-Duty GMT400 pickups (alongside the GMT400 SUVs) were continued until 2000, with the new GMT800 Silverado/Sierra HD (Heavy Duty) released a year later. A 3500 model was added later for 2001, with the introduction of the HD moniker (though it was not until the 2007 GMT900 model year a 3500HD debuted).

The trucks were refreshed in 2002 for the 2003 model year, bringing slight design changes and an upgrade to the audio and HVAC controls. The 2007 GMT800 trucks, built after the new GMT900 entered production, used the name Classic to denote the difference between the two generations.

== Second-generation Silverado / third-generation Sierra (GMT900; 2007) ==
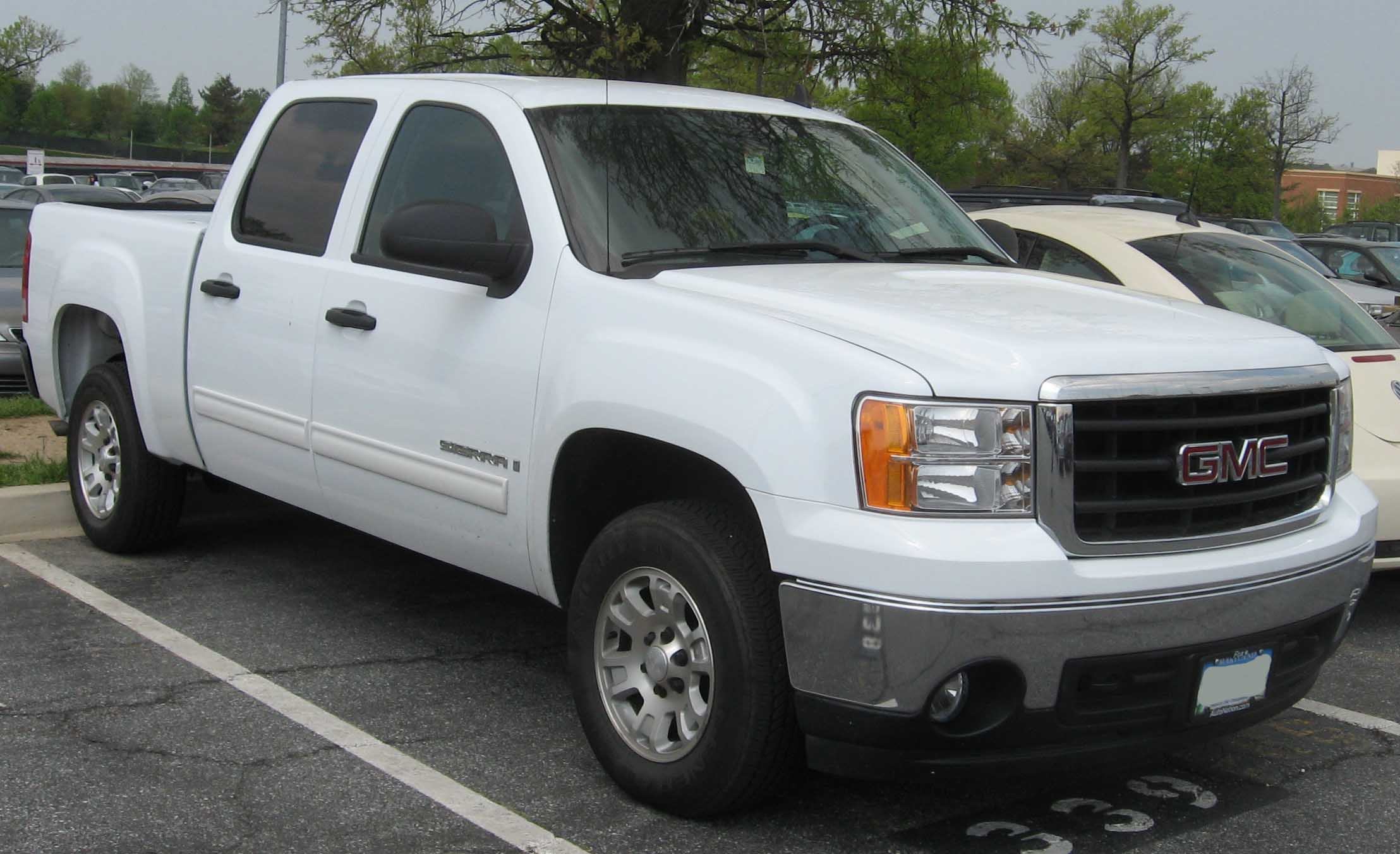
Third-generation GMC Sierra crew cab

The GMT900 generation of the Silverado/Sierra arrived in the last quarter of 2006 as a 2007 model. It features a redesigned exterior, interior, frame, and suspension as well as power increases on certain engines. Like the previous generation GMT800's and earlier C/K lines, it takes many styling cues from the GMT900 SUVs of the same year. Like the GMT900 SUVs, these pickups have improved aerodynamics over their predecessors thanks to steeply raked windshields and tighter panel gaps which help improve fuel economy. The previous GMT800 models were continued through 2007 badged as "Classic," just as the GMT400 models continued for two years after the GMT800's introduction.

The new Silverado earned the North American Truck of the Year award for 2007, and was Motor Trend magazine's Truck of the Year for 2007.

Production continued until 2013, and 2014 for 2500HD and 3500HD models.

== Third-generation Silverado / fourth-generation Sierra (GMT K2XX; 2014) ==
Third generation
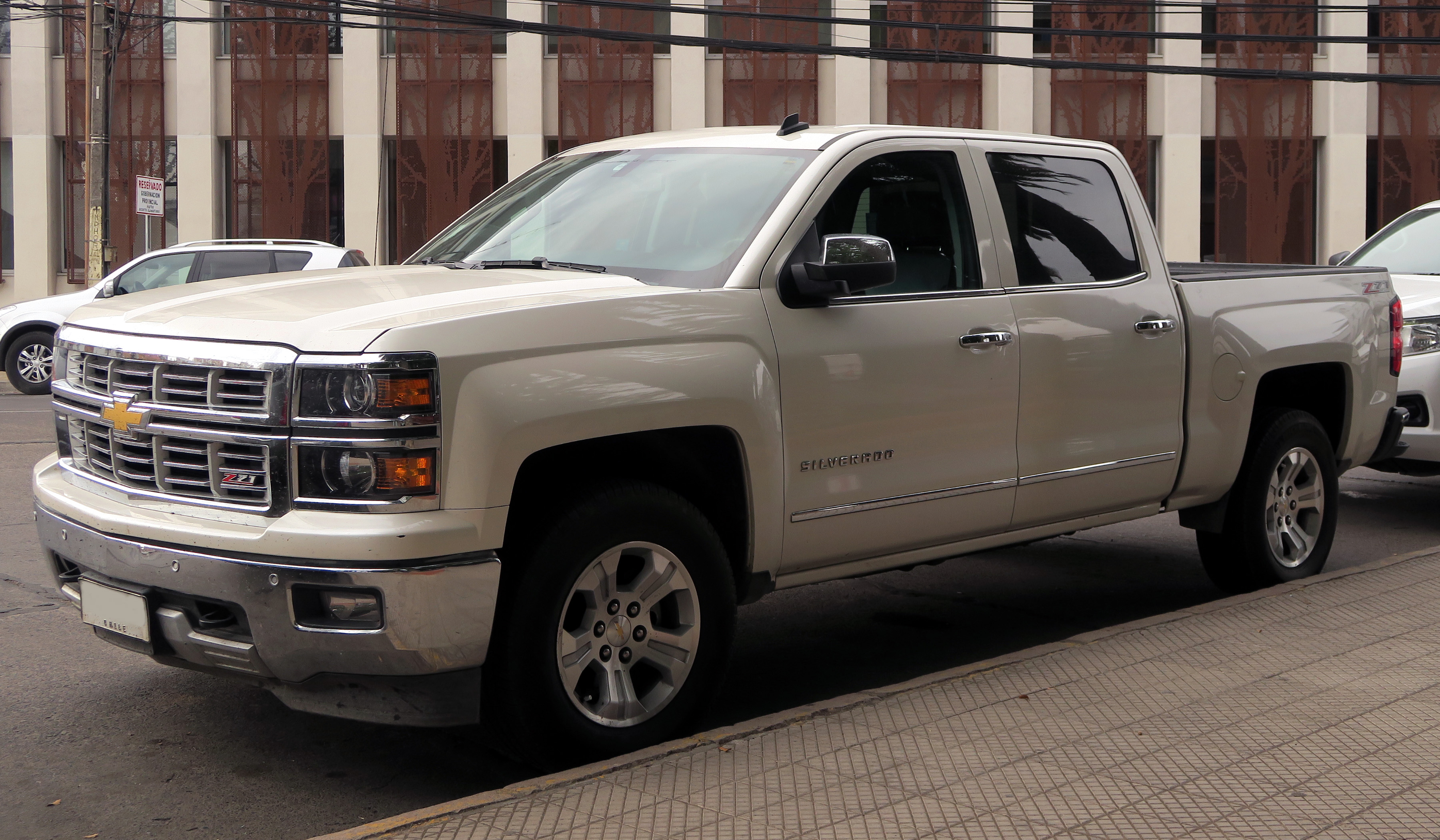
- 2014 Silverado LTZ Crew Cab 4×4

Overview
- Also called: Chevrolet Silverado LD/GMC Sierra Limited (2019)
- Production: 2013–2018 (1500); 2014–2019 (HD); 2018–2019 (LD)
- Model years: 2014–2018 (1500); 2019 (1500 LD); 2015–2019 (HD)
- Assembly: United States: Roanoke, Indiana (Fort Wayne Assembly); Flint, Michigan (Flint Truck Assembly); Canada: Oshawa, Ontario (Oshawa Car Assembly); Mexico: Silao, Guanajuato (Silao Assembly); Australia: Melbourne, Victoria (GM-Holden, RHD remanufacturing)
- Designer: Kevin O'Donnell (2010)

Body and chassis
- Platform: GMT K2XX

Powertrain
- Engine: 1500: LV3 EcoTec3 4.3 L V6 285 hp (213 kW; 289 PS); L83 EcoTec3 5.3 L V8 355 hp (265 kW; 360 PS) (365 hp (272 kW; 370 PS) for Sierra All Terrain X); L8B EcoTec3 5.3 L V8 355 hp (265 kW; 360 PS); L86 EcoTec3 6.2 L V8 420 hp (313 kW; 426 PS); HD: LY6 Vortec 6000 6.0 L V8 360 hp (268 kW; 365 PS); L96 Vortec 6000 6.0 L V8 360 hp (268 kW; 365 PS); LML Duramax 6.6 L V8 (2015-16) 397 hp (296 kW; 403 PS); L5P Duramax 6.6 L V8 (2017-20) 445 hp (332 kW; 451 PS)
- Transmission: 6-speed 6L80 automatic; 6-speed 6L90 automatic; 8-speed 8L90 automatic; 6-speed Allison 1000 automatic
- Battery: 0.45 kWh lithium-ion (eAssist mild hybrid)

Dimensions
- Wheelbase: Regular 6'6": 119 in (3,023 mm); Regular 8': 133 in (3,378 mm); Double 6'6" & Crew 5'5": 143.5 in (3,645 mm); Crew 6'6": 153 in (3,886 mm); Crew 8': 167 in (4,242 mm)
- Length: Regular 6'6": 205.6 in (5,222 mm); Regular 8': 224.4 in (5,700 mm); Double & Crew 5'5": 230 in (5,842 mm); Crew 6'6": 239.6 in (6,086 mm); Crew 8': 258.3 in (6,561 mm)
- Width: 80 in (2,032 mm)
- Height: 73.5 in (1,867 mm) – 74.2 in (1,885 mm)
- Curb weight: 4,696–4,948 lb (2,130–2,244 kg) (Regular Cab); 4,982–5,232 lb (2,260–2,373 kg) (Double Cab); 5,036–5,300 lb (2,284–2,404 kg) (Crew Cab)

Chronology
- Predecessor: Cadillac Escalade EXT (for High Country)

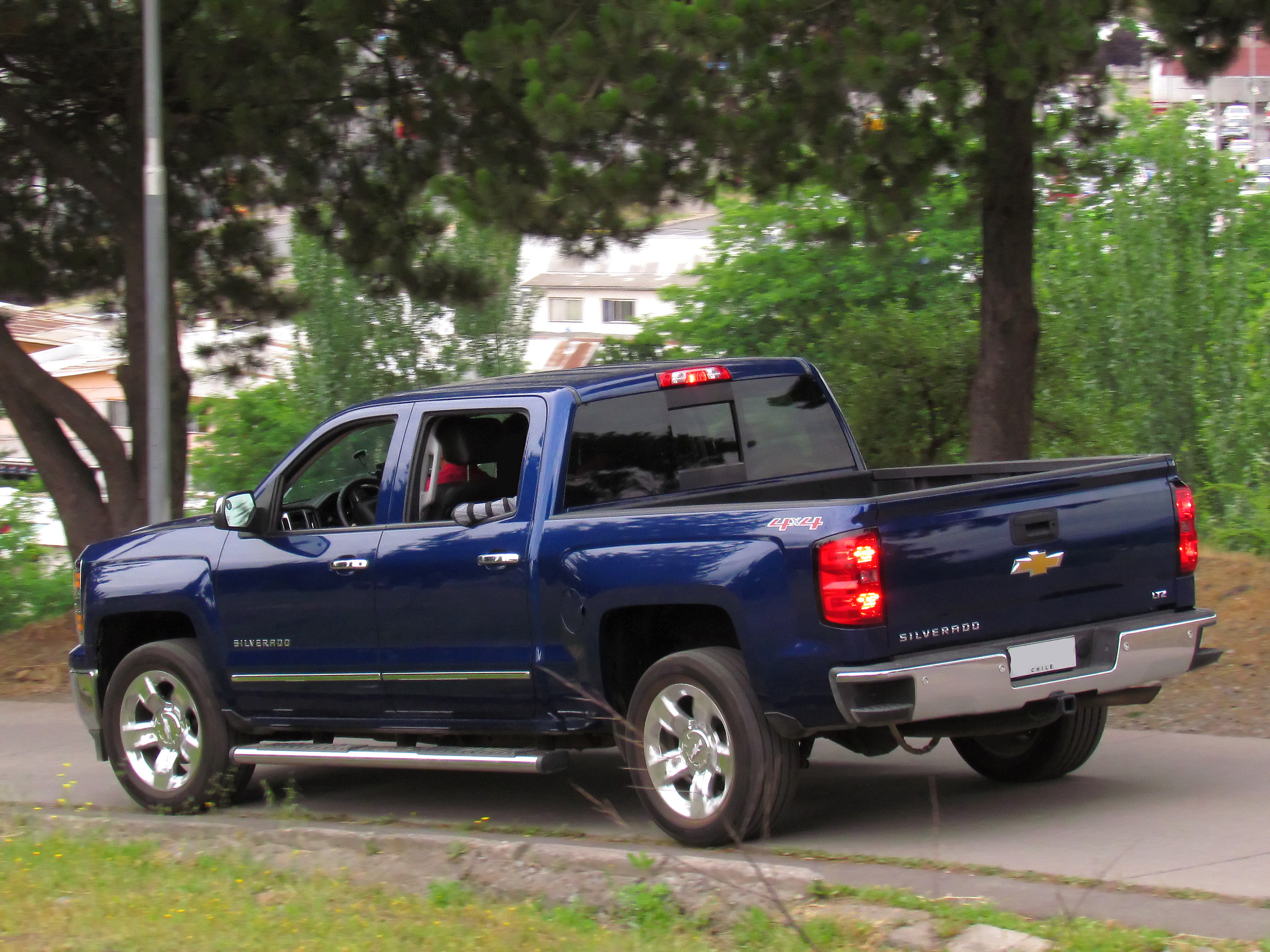
A blue 2014 Silverado LTZ Crew Cab 4×4 similar to Steve McGarrett's truck from Hawaii Five-0; in the "Kupu-eu" episode

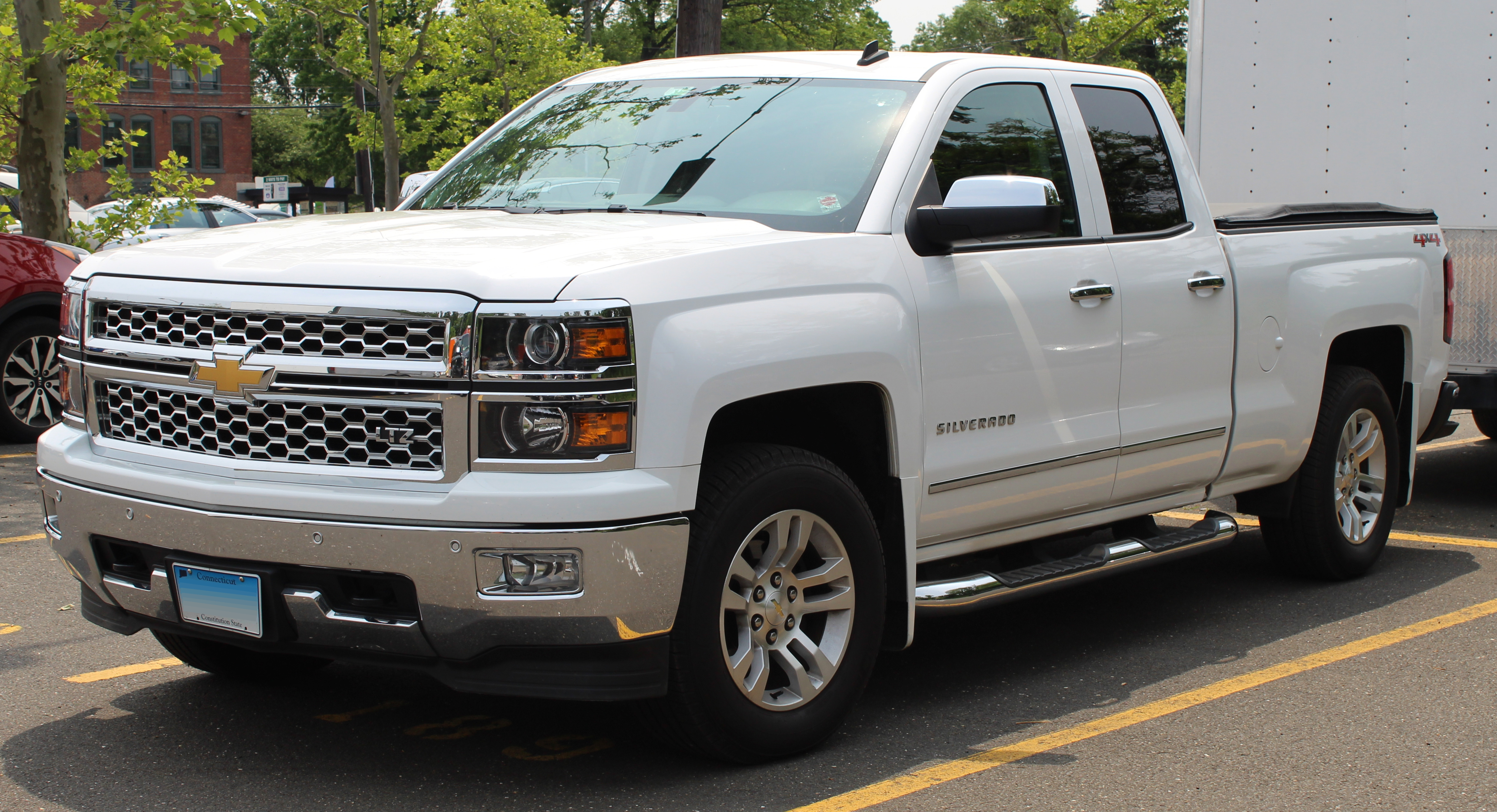
2014 Silverado LTZ Double Cab 4×4

On December 13, 2012, the fully-redesigned 2014 Chevrolet Silverado and GMC Sierra were both introduced in Detroit, Michigan, later making their public debut at the North American International Auto Show. With this generation, GM dropped the GMT900 platform, and replaced it with the K2XX platform. This generation of the Silverado/Sierra 1500 has three new gasoline engine options: a 4.3 L EcoTec3 V6, a 5.3 L EcoTec3 V8, and a 6.2 L EcoTec3 V8, all featuring cylinder deactivation and aluminum blocks, while dropping the 4.8 L V8 from the last generation. Chevrolet's MyLink multimedia touchscreen interface system became available on most models. It included A2DP stereo streaming technologies, Bluetooth hands-free telephone, USB hookups, and an input for an iPod or iPhone. A Bose premium audio system, as well as a Bose surround sound audio system, was available on most models. OnStar became standard on all models. A Crew Cab model with the 6.5' bed became available for the first time on 1500-series trucks.

Underneath, the Silverado rides on a fully boxed high-strength steel frame with hydroforming technology; truck cab's frame is built with high strength steel as well. The third-generation Silverado uses aluminum on the hood, for the engine block, and for the control arms in order to save mass. The truck's bed is made of roll-formed steel instead of stamped steel used by other manufacturers in order to save weight and gain strength. The third-generation Silverado introduced the all-new upmarket top-of-the-line "High Country" trim level which includes saddle brown leather interior, which is Chevrolet's very first entry into the luxury truck market since the 1955–1959 Task-Force 3100 "Cameo Carrier." A fully-squared front fascia takes retro-modern styling cues from the GMT400 and 1981–1987 Square-Body trucks, and on Z71 models, a Z71 badge was added to the bottom right place of the grille. The first production Silverado was built on April 29, 2013. The Silverado 1500 went on sale in May 2013 as a 2014 model, with the Silverado HD being available in early 2014 for the 2015 model year. On January 10, 2014, a recall was issued for 370,000 Silverado and Sierra pickups over a fire risk.

Trim levels for the Silverado included Work Truck, LS, Custom, LT, LTZ, and High Country. For the Sierra, they were the base "Sierra", SLE, SLT, and Denali. On the 1500 models, the 4.3 L V6 was standard on trims up to LT and SLE, and flex-fuel capability was included. The 5.3 L V8 was available on all trims and standard on LTZ, High Country, SLT, and Denali (these four trims also offered the 6.2 L V8 as an option), as well as all 2016–2018 Crew Cab models with the 6.5' bed.

On January 14, 2014, the Silverado, along with the Corvette Stingray, received the 2014 North American International Auto Show's Car and Truck of the Year awards, respectively.

For 2018, this generation of Silverado was officially exported to Australia and converted to right-hand-drive and Australian Design Rules (ADR) by General Motors Australian subsidiary, Holden Special Vehicles (HSV). In the past, several independent specialists imported and converted Silverados and Sierras for Australian and right-hand-drive markets. Only 2500HD and 3500HD models equipped with 6.6L Duramax diesel option were available. Neither gasoline engines nor 1500-series trucks were offered.

=== 2015 ===
For the 2015 model year, the 6.2L EcoTec3 was paired with the new eight-speed 8L90 transmission, offering a wider ratio spread with more closely spaced gears, quicker shifts, improved acceleration, and fuel economy. The Silverado 2500HD/3500HD models carried over the 6.0L L96 flex-fuel capable Vortec engine combined with the 6L90E transmission, installed with engine oil and transmission fluid coolers for hauling/towing applications. The 6.6L Duramax also continued to be backed by the six-speed Allison 1000 automatic. The LS trim made its return to the Silverado 1500, slotted between the Work Truck and LT trims. The 1500 Regular Cab Long Box model became available from the factory without a pickup bed (i.e., as a chassis cab). GM last offered its half-ton trucks as chassis cabs in 1980.

The GMC Sierra 2500HD/3500HD were the first "heavy-duty" trucks to offer Adaptive Cruise Control (ACC), a Forward Collision Warning System (FCWS), and a Lane Departure Warning System (LDWS) available together as part of the available Driver Assist Package. The Driver Assist Package was standard equipment on the GMC Sierra 2500HD/3500HD Denali, and optional on most other Chevrolet Silverado and GMC Sierra 2500HD/3500HD models. Other new options for the Silverado and Sierra 2500HD/3500HD models included an eight-inch, full-color, reconfigurable LCD Driver Information Center (DIC) screen (for Sierra 2500HD/3500HD Denali models only), a 110-volt AC household-style power outlet, up to six available USB ports, an available eight-inch touchscreen infotainment system, and a power-sliding rear window with integrated defroster.

In mid-year 2015, Chevrolet and GMC made enhancements to the all-new Silverado 2500HD/3500HD and Sierra 2500HD/3500HD. Some of these enhancements included a new OnStar telematics system with 4G LTE Wi-Fi capabilities, new wheel designs, new exterior paint color options, new exterior tow mirror designs, a USB port added the glove compartment of trucks equipped with a front bench seat, Duralife brake rotors, the availability of dual-150-amp and 220-amp alternators for models equipped with the 6.6-liter Duramax Turbodiesel V8 engine, an off-road information screen added to the instrument cluster of 4×4 models equipped with the Z71 or All-Terrain Packages (the latter is a GMC-only option), a Bi-Fuel Compressed Natural Gas (CNG) option for models equipped with the 6.0L Vortec gasoline V8 engine, a new All-Terrain Package available on SLE and SLT Double Cab and Crew Cab models (for GMC models only), a standard heavy-duty locking rear axle for all models, and the removal of HD Radio from the "up-level" IO5 and IO6 infotainment systems. A Regular Production Option (RPO) code of "AVF" on the Service Parts Identification sticker in the upper glove compartment distinguishes early-build 2015 models from their 2015.5 successors.

==== Special Editions ====
For 2015, Chevrolet introduced a Special Edition for the Silverado truck series. They are in the following series of Rally Edition 1 and 2, Midnight Edition, Custom Sport Edition, Custom Sport Plus Edition, Black Out Edition, and Texas Edition.

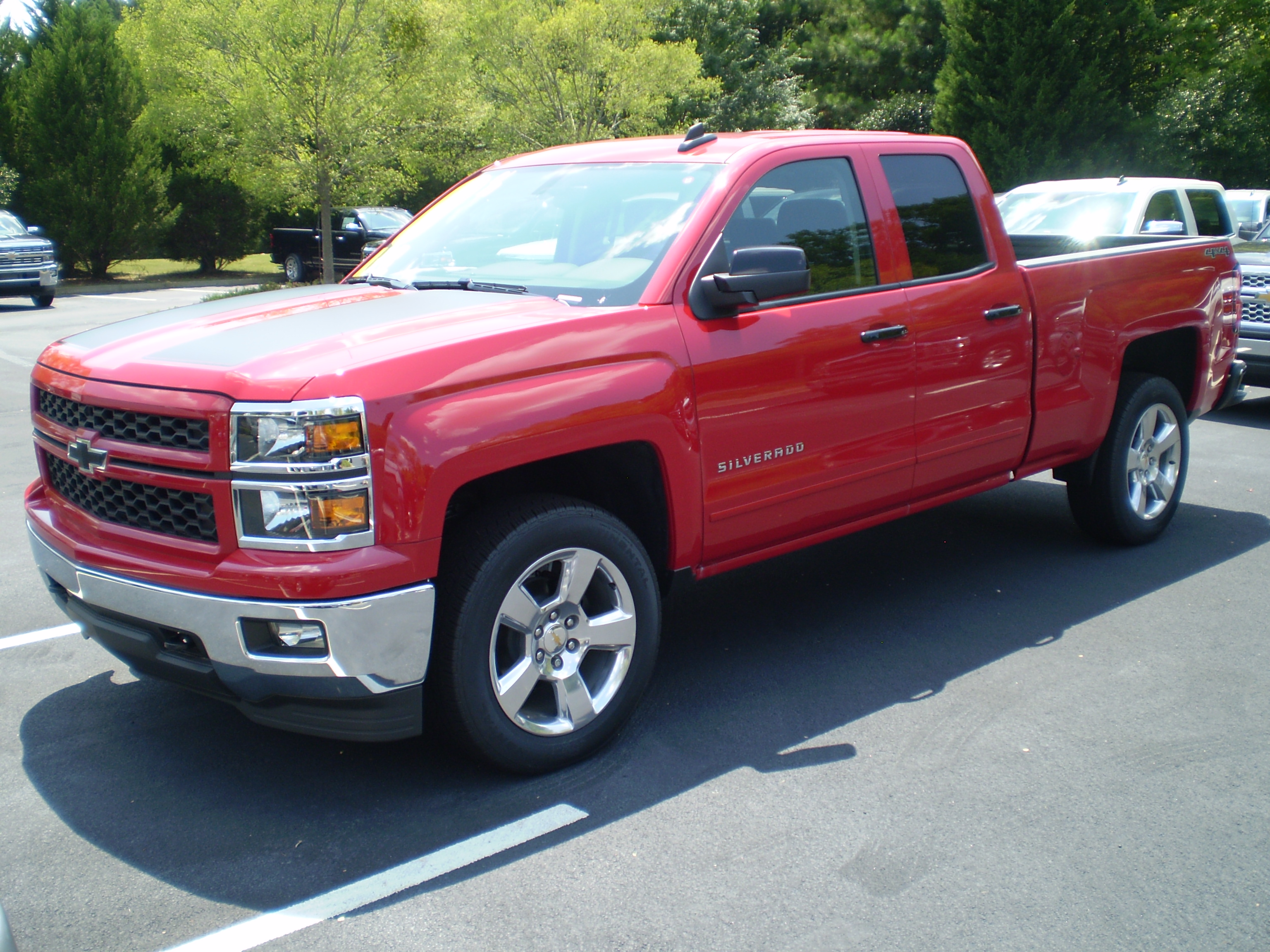
Rally Edition 1

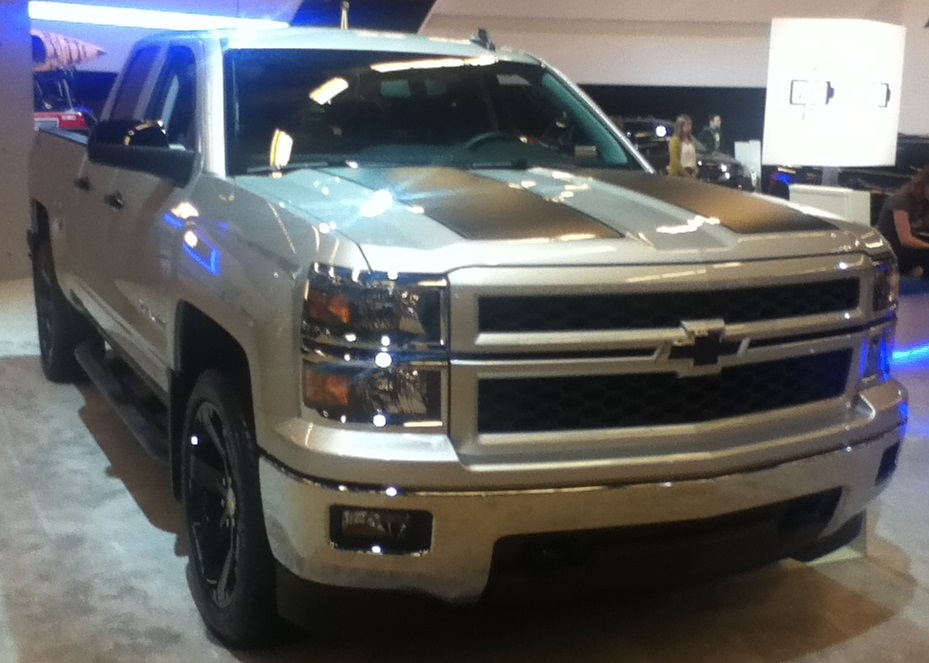
Rally Edition 2

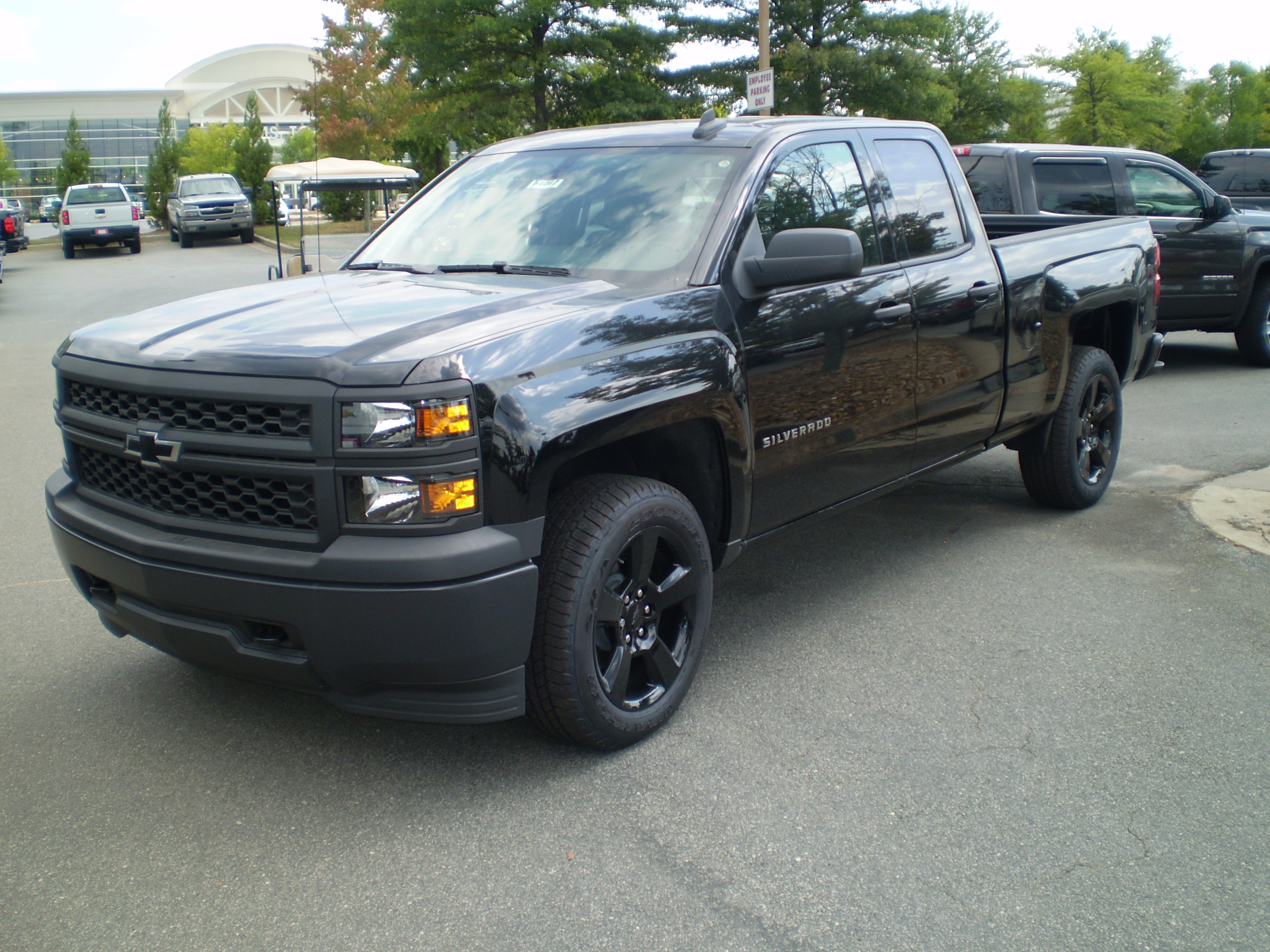
Black Out Edition

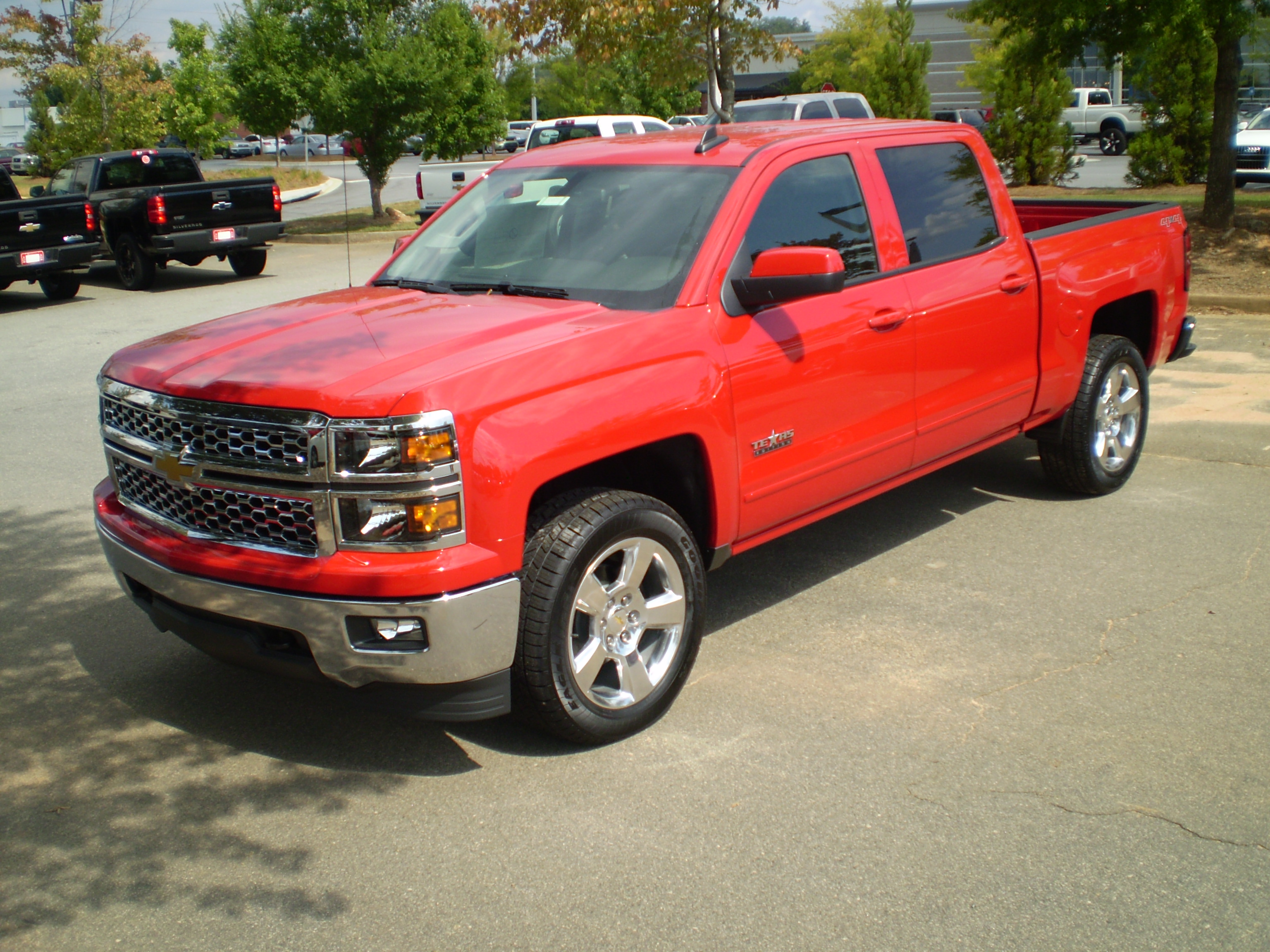
Texas Edition

=== 2016 mid-cycle refresh ===
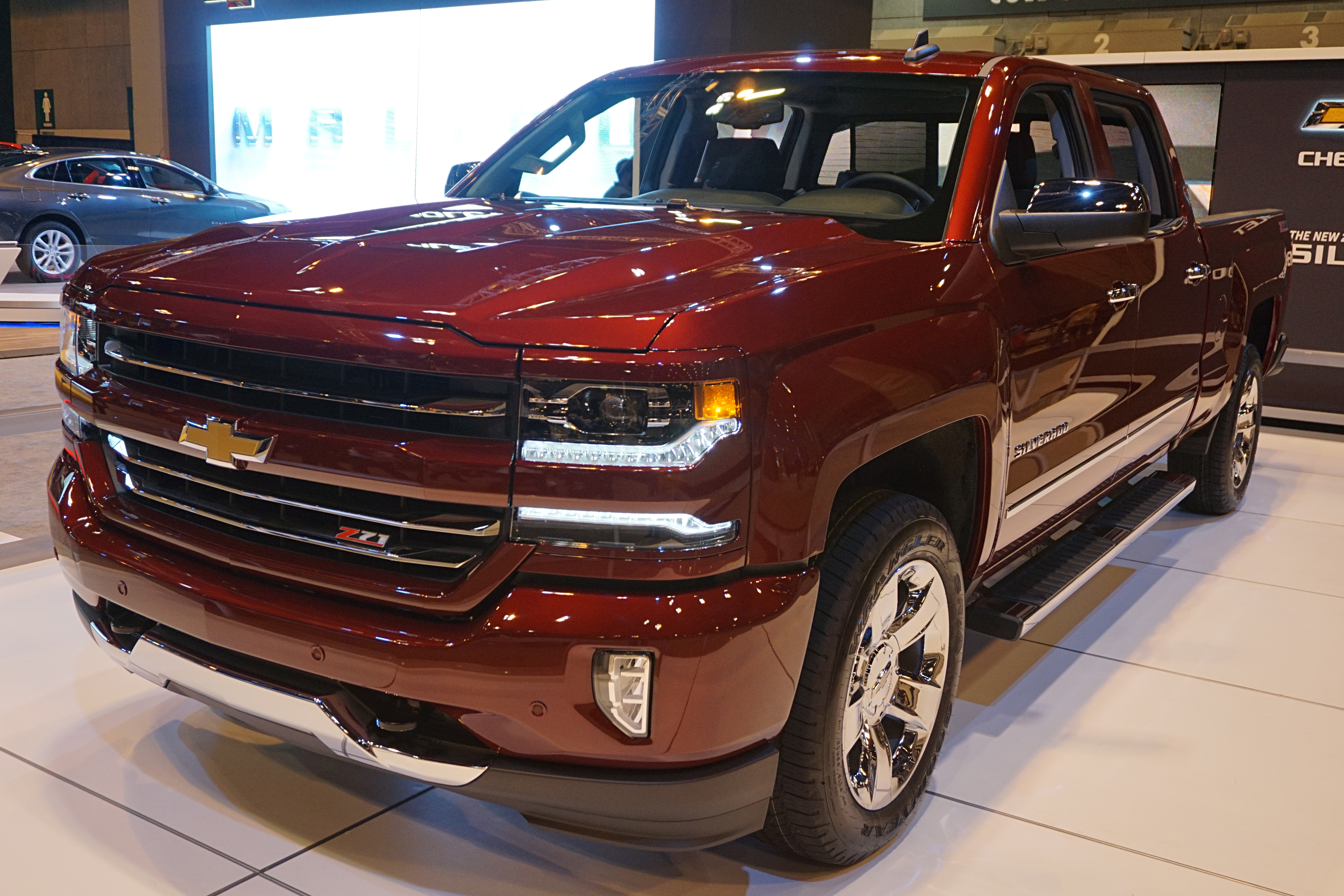
2016 Chevrolet Silverado LTZ Z71

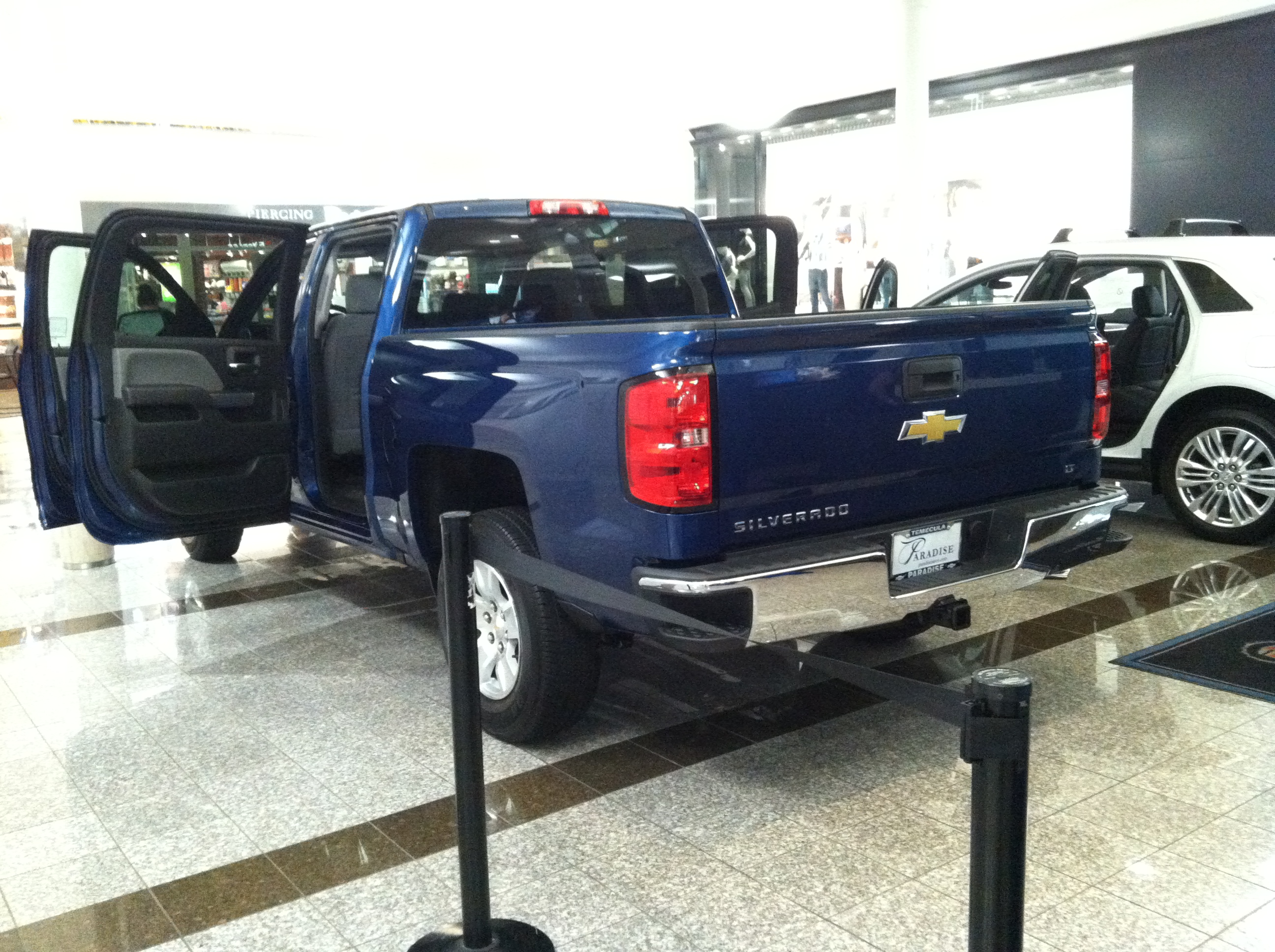
2017 Chevrolet Silverado LT rear

For 2016, the Chevrolet Silverado 1500 and GMC Sierra 1500 received a mid-cycle refresh. The refreshed Silverado and Sierra received a new grille, headlights, and front fascia, with design influences from the 2015 Chevrolet Colorado, as well as all-new LED taillights on the 2016 Silverado 1500 LTZ and High Country, and GMC Sierra 1500 SLT and Denali trim levels, while the 2016 Chevrolet Silverado LT trim levels and below still have the pre-facelifted incandescent taillights along with the 2016 GMC Sierra SLE trim levels and below. Silverado 1500 LTZ and High Country, as well as Sierra 1500 SLT and Denali models equipped with LED headlights, can be optioned with the Intellibeam high beam assist system. On October 1, 2015, HD Radio was added to the Silverado and Sierra to their eight-inch MyLink system as standard equipment on the LT and LTZ trims, while the Sierra included the feature in its IntelliLink system as standard on all its trims. 2016 Silverado and Sierra models optioned with the eight-inch touch screen featured Apple CarPlay and Android Auto capability. Trucks ordered with bucket seats and center console now featured a wireless charging pad on the console lid.

New color options for the Silverado included Iridescent Pearl Tricoat (1500 only), Autumn Bronze Metallic, Iridescent Pearl Tricoat (only on High Country), Siren Red Tintcoat, and Red Hot, while the Sierra's new colors included White Frost Tricoat (also 1500 only), Mahogany Metallic, Crimson Red Tintcoat, and Cardinal Red. There was also a new Custom trim for the Silverado 1500, available in Double or Crew Cab. The 4.3L V6 was no longer offered on Crew Cab Standard Bed models, and the Z71 package was no longer offered on 2WD models.

==== Chevrolet Special Edition ====
For that year, Chevrolet added and dropped some of the Special Editions for the Silverado truck series. They are in the following series of Rally Edition 1 and 2, Midnight HD Edition, Midnight Edition, Custom Sport HD Edition, Realtree Edition, Custom Sport HD Edition, and Special Ops Edition.

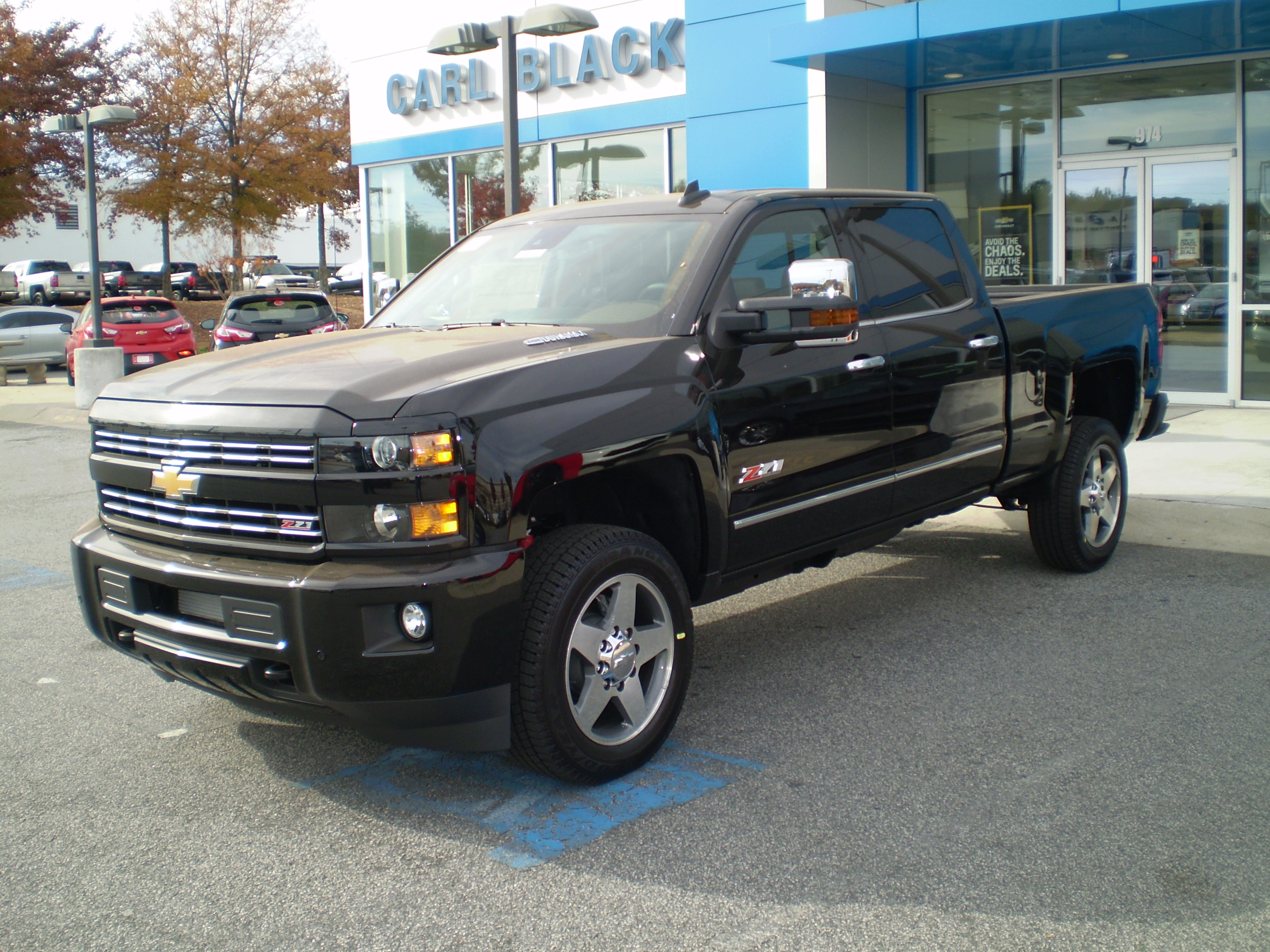
Custom Sport HD Edition

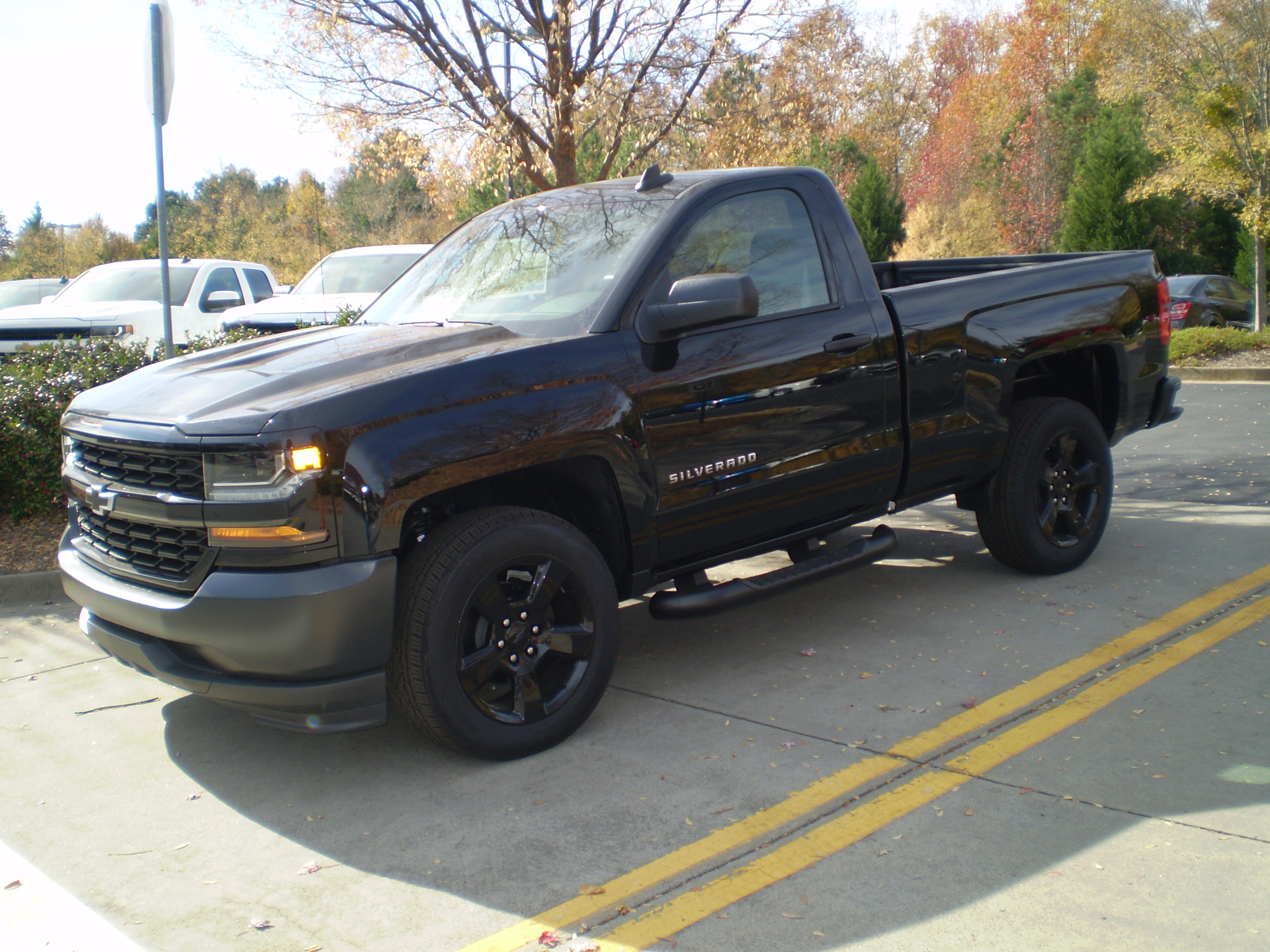
Blackout Edition

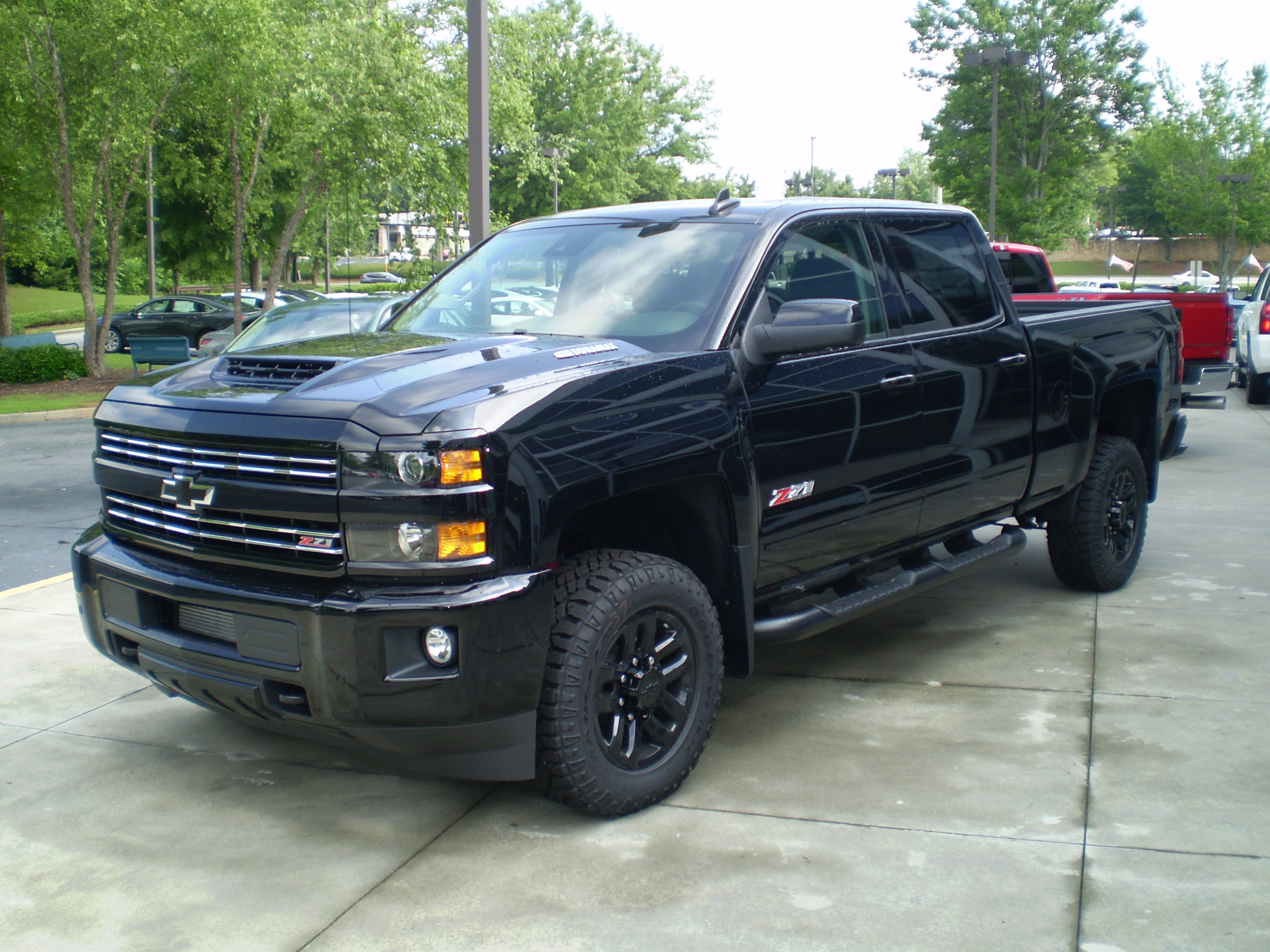
Midnight HD edition

=== 2017 ===
For the 2017 model year, Silverado and Sierra HD models were introduced with a new 6.6L Duramax turbo-diesel V8 (L5P) and received a new hood with air intake vents. All gasoline-powered pickups now have a capless fuel filler. The Sierra HD now included standard HID headlamps on all trim levels. New colors included Graphite Metallic and Pepperdust Metallic (Silverado) or Dark Slate Metallic and Pepperdust Metallic (Sierra). Jet Black/Medium Ash Gray interior trim was added for Silverado High Country. Low-speed mitigation braking was added to the Driver Alert Package for both Silverado and Sierra.

All Silverado and Sierra models received minor changes to their MyLink (Chevrolet) and IntelliLink (GMC) infotainment systems. The interior backlighting on GMC Sierras changed from red to blue-green (or teal). Silverado and Sierra Double and Crew Cabs also received several new safety features, including GM's Rear Seat Reminder and Teen Driver Mode.

=== eAssist Mild Hybrid ===
Starting in 2016, GM offered an eAssist mild hybrid version of the 5.3L V8 engine in the Silverado LT and Sierra SLT, but only in the state of California. The engine came with an eight-speed automatic transmission and had the same horsepower and torque as the standard version. For 2017, it was also available in Hawaii, Oregon, Texas, and Washington. For 2018, it became available nationwide and was also offered in the Silverado LTZ. All hybrid models were crew cabs.

=== Silverado SSV ===
In late 2014, Chevrolet released the 2015 Silverado SSV (Special Service Vehicle) to complement its lineup of law enforcement vehicles. The SSV Silverado was available in the 1500 Crew Cab with either the short (5.5') or standard (6.5') box. The 5.3L EcoTec3 V8 was the only engine option, and the SSV was based on the WT trim. It featured beefier brake rotors, upgraded oil coolers, high-output alternator, auxiliary battery, and an upfitter-friendly interior.

==== Special editions ====
===== GMC =====
In 2016, GMC introduced the Sierra All Terrain X, which is equipped with a 5.3L V8 engine with performance exhaust, increasing power from 355 to 365 horsepower (265 to 272 kW; 360 to 370 PS). On the exterior, the Sierra All Terrain X features black 18-inch rims fitted with larger 265/65R18SL Goodyear Wrangler Duratrac MT tires, black bed-mounted sport bar, LED off-road lights, and blacked-out accents.

After introducing the Sierra 1500 All Terrain X and Canyon All Terrain X, GMC extended the same formula to its heavy-duty pickup family with the Sierra HD All Terrain X in 2017. It was available on four-wheel-drive 2500 HD crew cab models and came in either Black Onyx or Summit White exterior colors.

All Terrain X models had a body-color grille surround and a grille insert that was unique to the All Terrain. Body-color door handles, front and rear bumpers, bodyside moldings, and black accents, including belt moldings, front bumper skid plate, and B-pillar accents, gave it a monochromatic appearance.

Sierra HD All Terrain X models also included 18-inch black-painted aluminum wheels—fitted with LT275/65R18 Goodyear Duratrac MT-rated tires—along with four-inch black sport side steps, black heated and power-folding trailering mirrors with integrated turn signals and LED guidance lamps, a spray-on bedliner, and a black bed-mounted sport bar, which was designed to support available LED off-road driving lamps from GMC Accessories.

Inside, the All Terrain X had the GMC IntelliLink infotainment system with an eight-inch diagonal color touchscreen, Teen Driver, remote-locking tailgate, remote starting system, Rear Vision Camera, adjustable pedals, leather-trimmed seats, heated front seats, and wireless mobile device charging.

A 6.0L gasoline V8 engine was standard, with the 6.6L Duramax turbo-diesel delivering 445 horsepower (332 kW; 451 PS) and 910 lb⋅ft (1,234 N⋅m; 126 kg⋅m) of torque being optional.

The Sierra HD All Terrain X also included the Z71 off-road suspension package, adding front underbody and transfer case skid plates, twin-tube Rancho shocks, hill descent control, and off-road information graphics in the Driver Information Center. An Eaton automatically locking rear differential (4.10:1) was also standard.

=== 2017 ===
==== Special Edition ====
===== Chevrolet =====
There were several additions to this year's Special Editions for the Silverado series shown in boldface. They are the following series of Midnight, Midnight HD, Rally 1, Rally 2, High Desert, Custom Sport HD, Realtree, Special Ops, Alaskan (available on HD series only), Redline, and Black Out. The remaining Special Editions listed in the 2017 Chevrolet Silverado brochure were the All Star Edition and Texas Edition.

New for 2017 was the High Desert option package (with a plastic roll-bar inspired by the Avalanche sport utility truck). This package brought a new innovative lockable storage system into the bed of the Silverado 1500 Crew Cab model. The system included a three-piece hard tonneau cover, dual lockable storage bins on each side of the truck bed, and a removable bed divider to keep items separate and from moving around the truck bed while the vehicle was in motion. The High Desert package was available on both two-wheel-drive and four-wheel-drive LT, LTZ, and High Country trim levels. It was not available on LTZ models with the Z71 off-road package. LT models with the High Desert package receive the same LED taillamps as the LTZ and High Country trims. Magnetic Ride Control was optional on High Country High Desert.

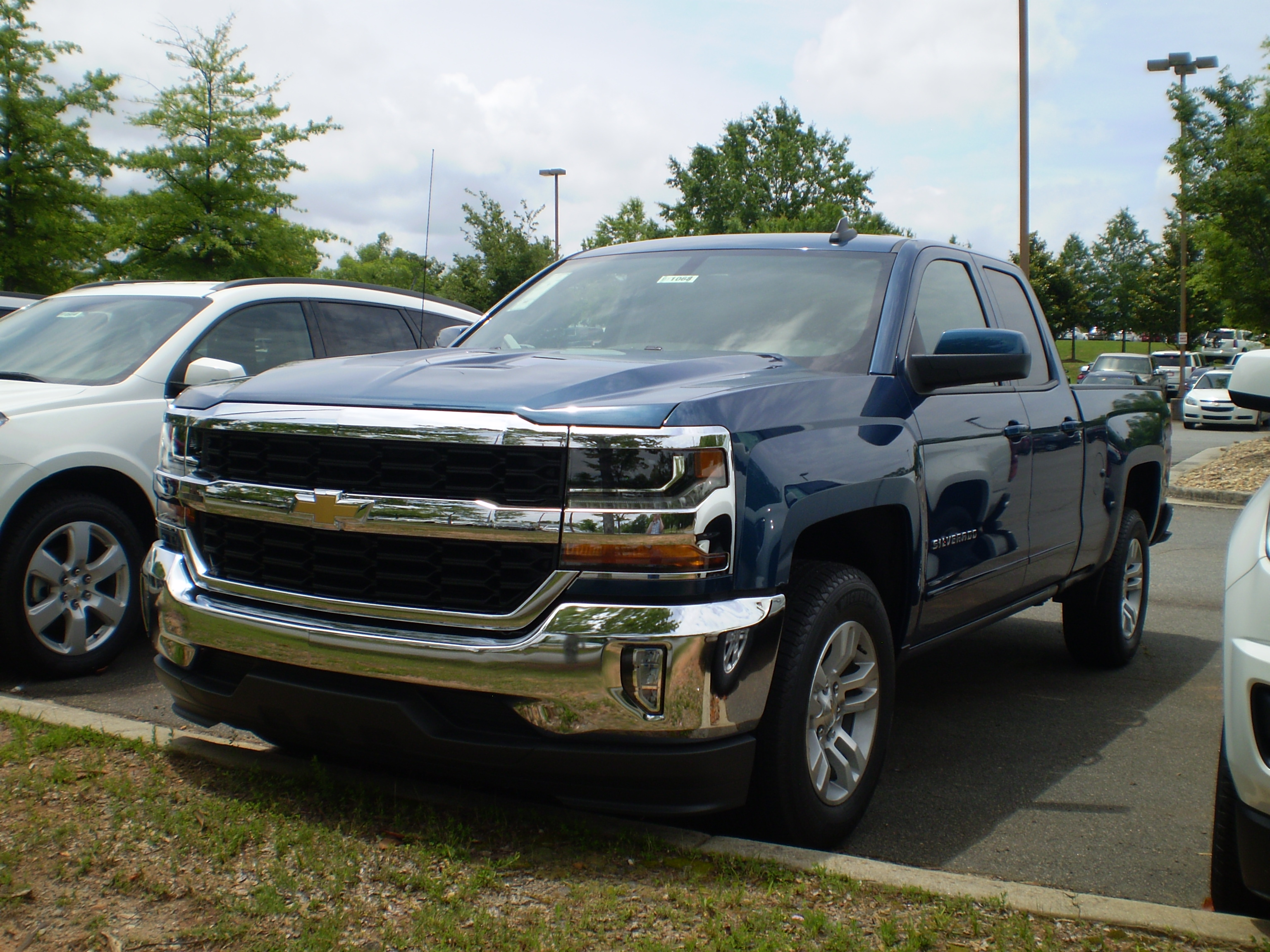
All Star Edition

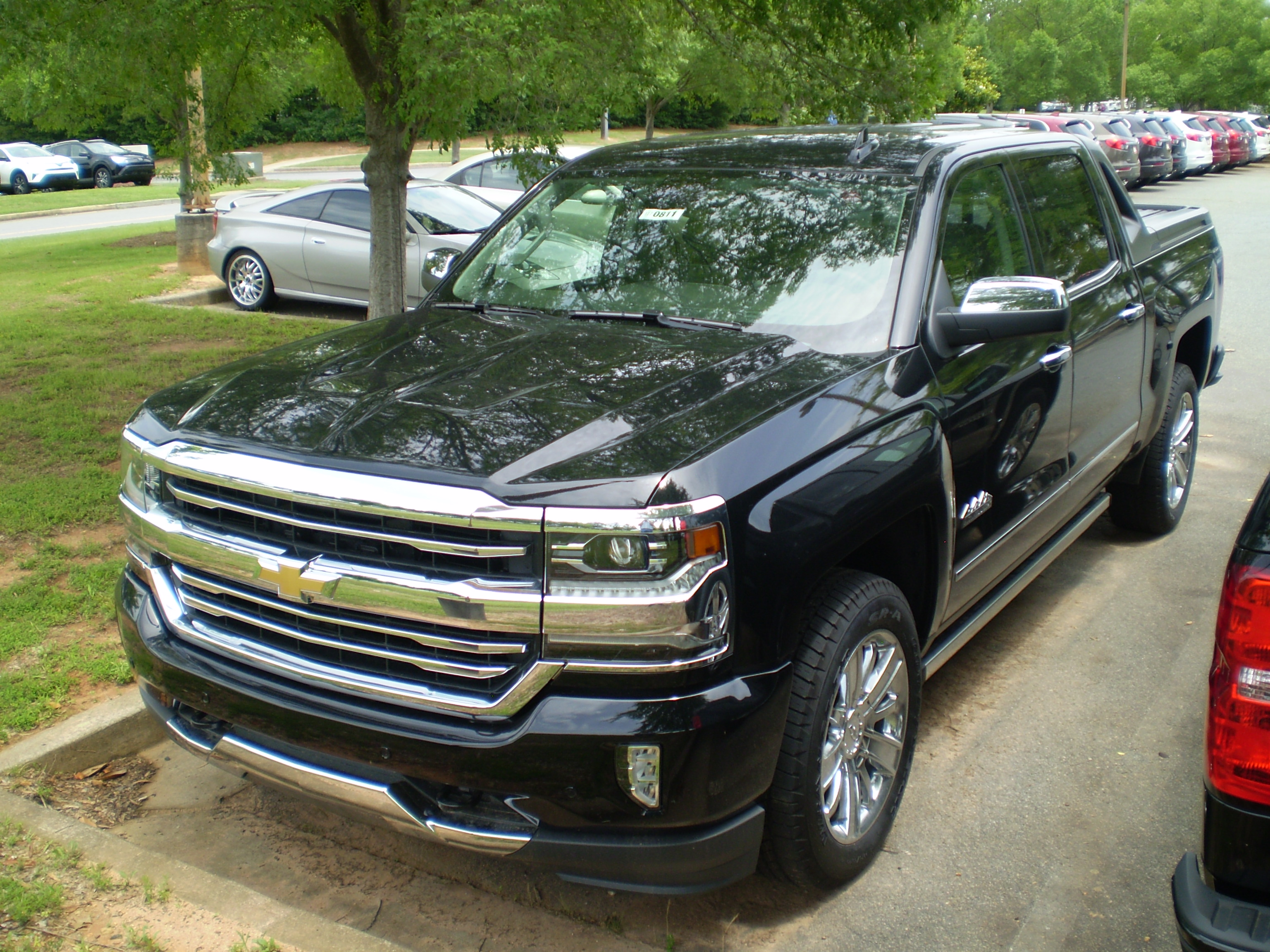
High Country High Desert Edition

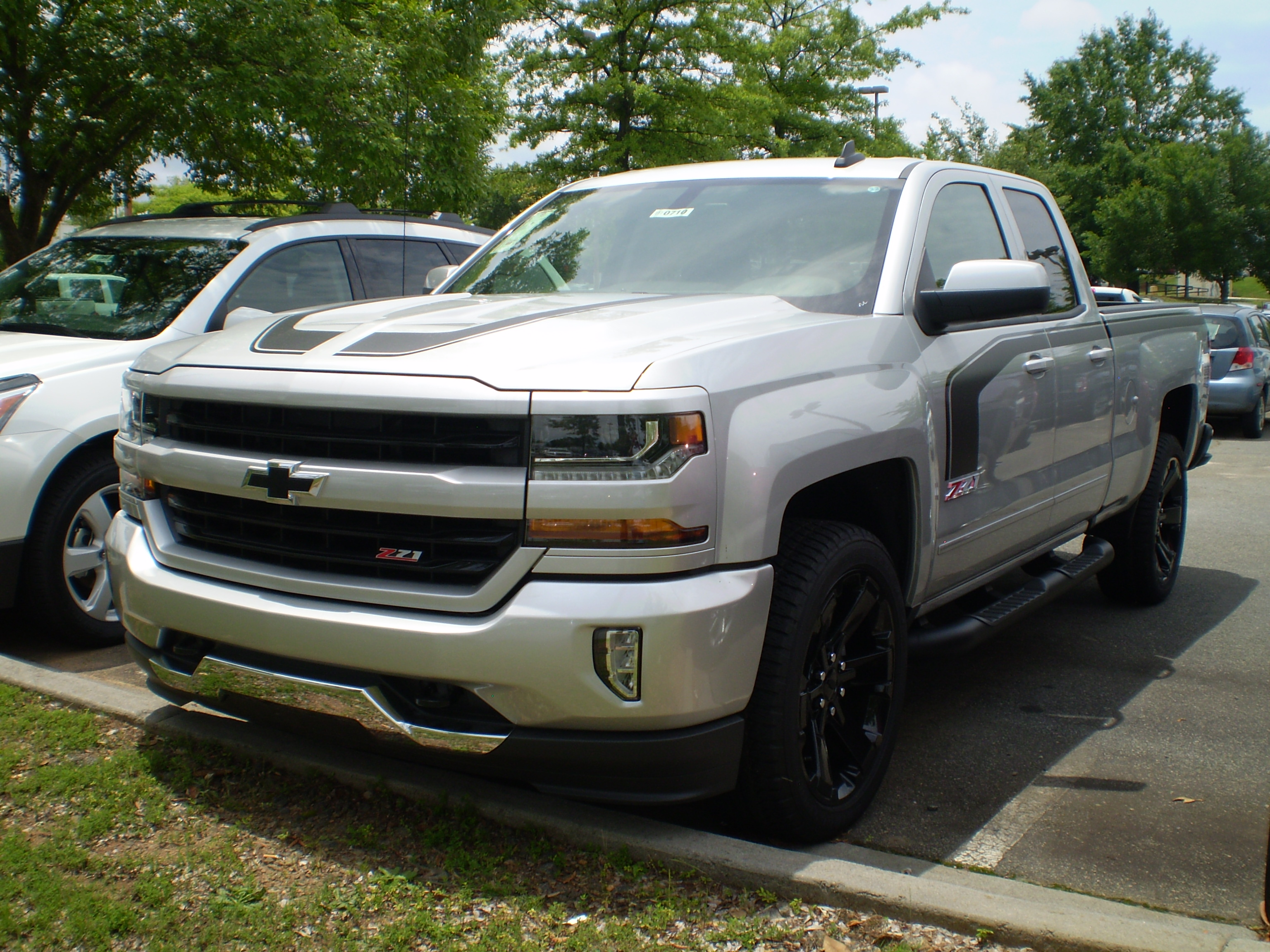
Rally 2 Edition

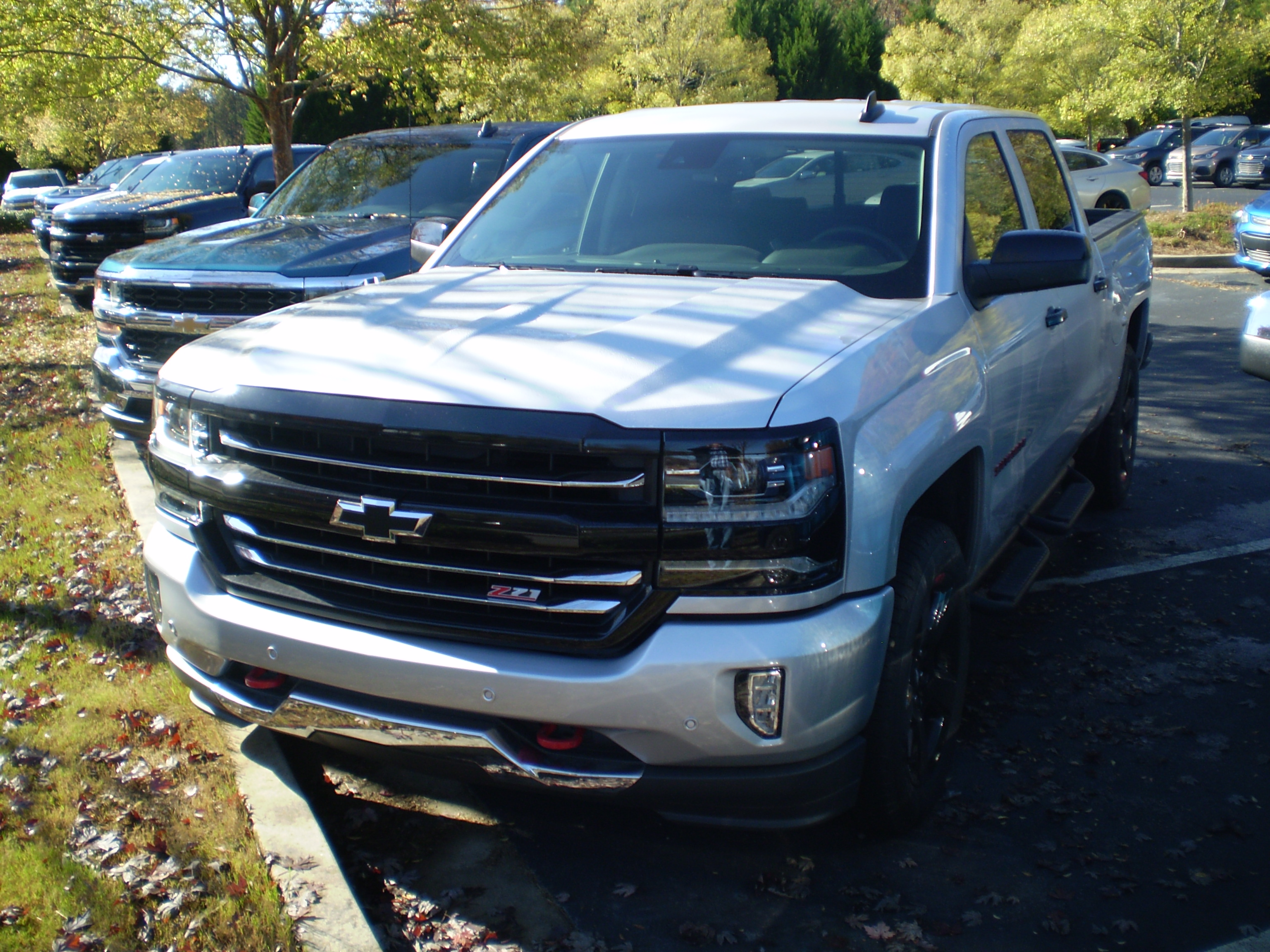
Redline Edition

=== 2018 ===
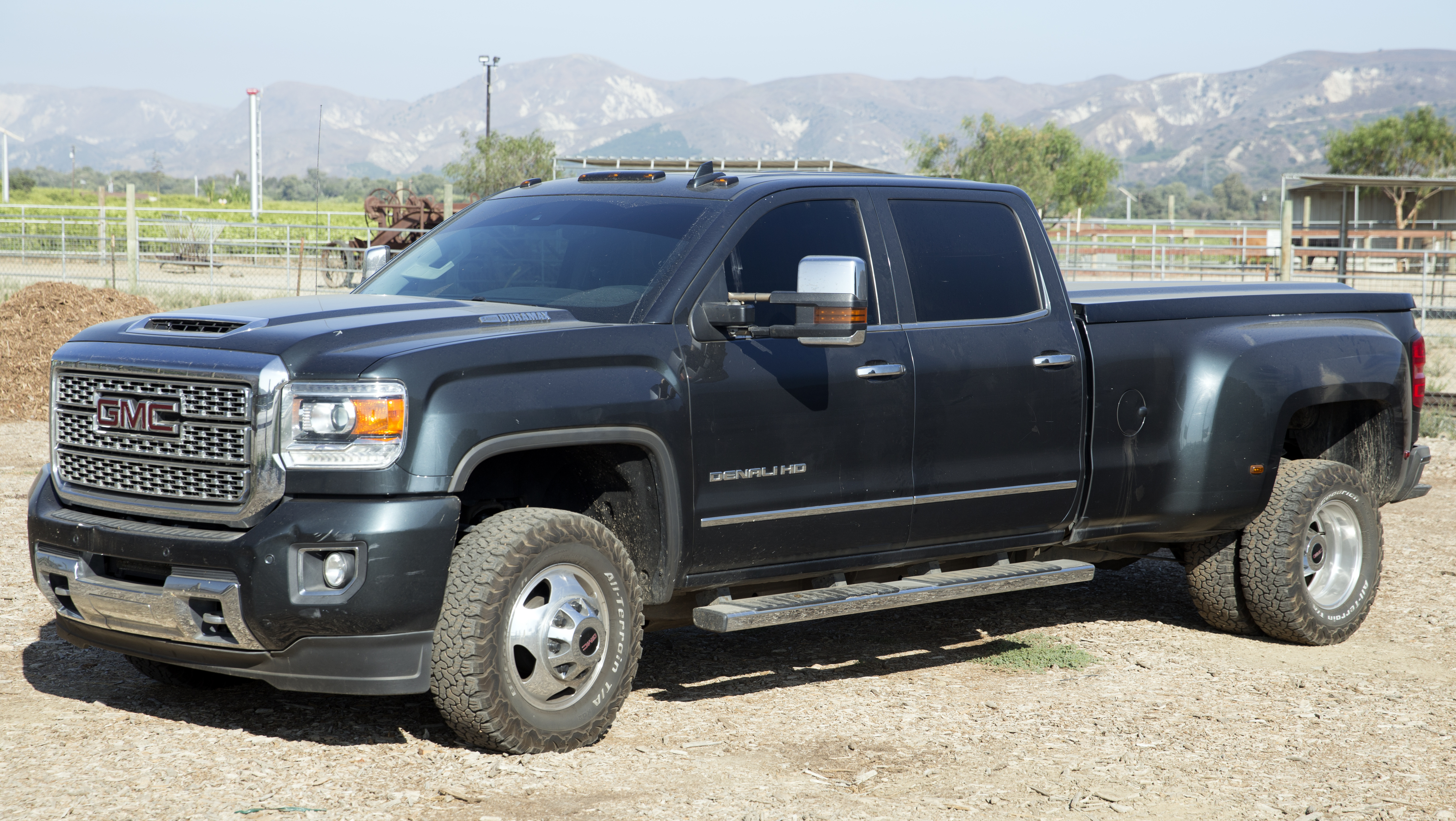
2018 GMC Sierra 3500HD Denali DRW

==== Special Edition ====
To commemorate the 100th anniversary of the first Chevrolet truck, GM introduced special edition models of the Chevrolet Silverado and the smaller Chevrolet Colorado.

===== Chevrolet =====
Chevrolet introduced the Centennial Edition Chevrolet Silverado for 2018. Only available in a Crew Cab Short Box configuration with the LTZ Z71 trim, the Centennial Edition added a model-exclusive Centennial Blue Metallic color option, 22-inch painted aluminum wheels with chrome inserts, and special "100 Years" Chevrolet Bowtie emblems. In addition to the Centennial Edition, the remaining Silverado Special Editions were virtually unchanged from the previous model year.

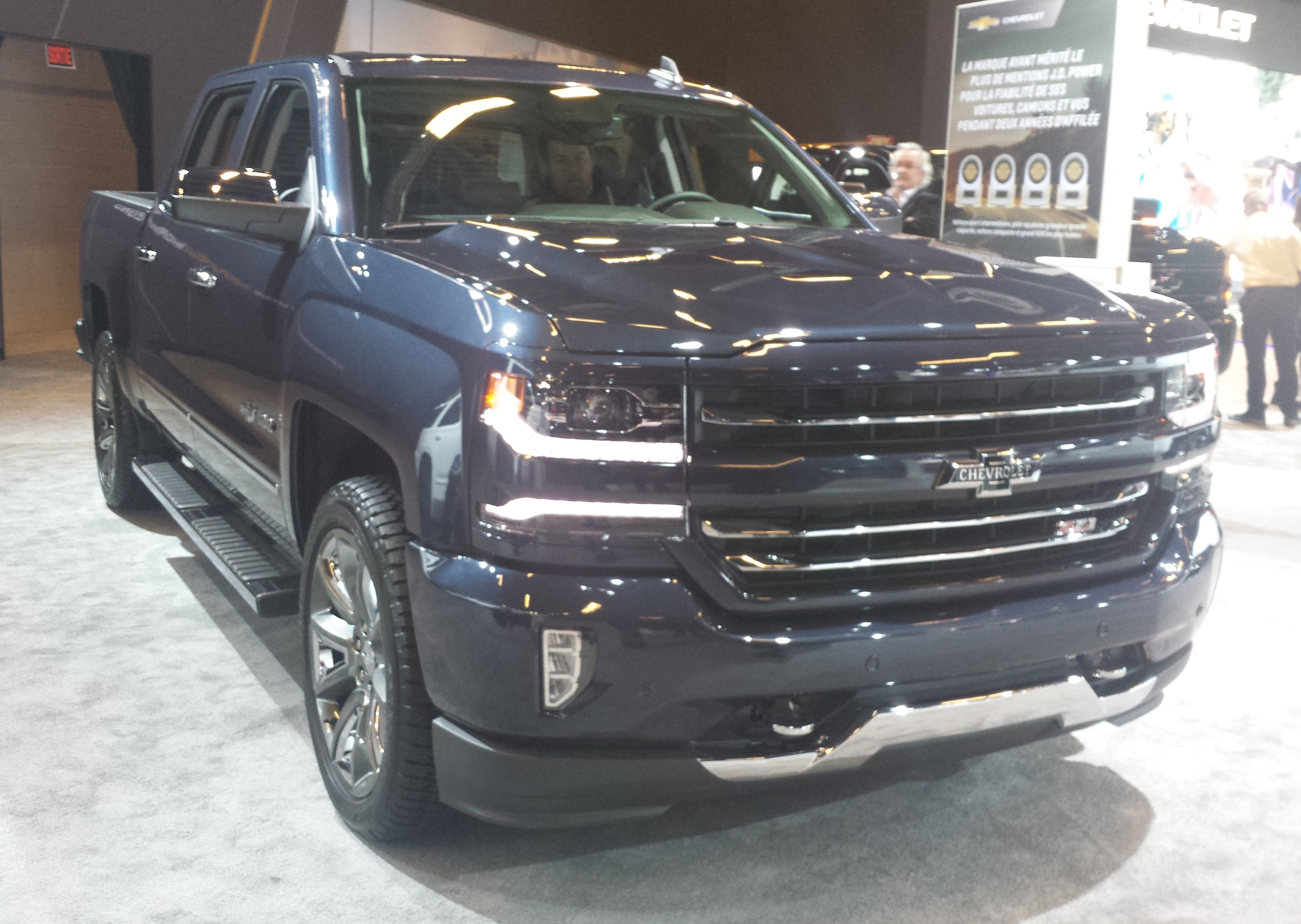
Centennial Edition

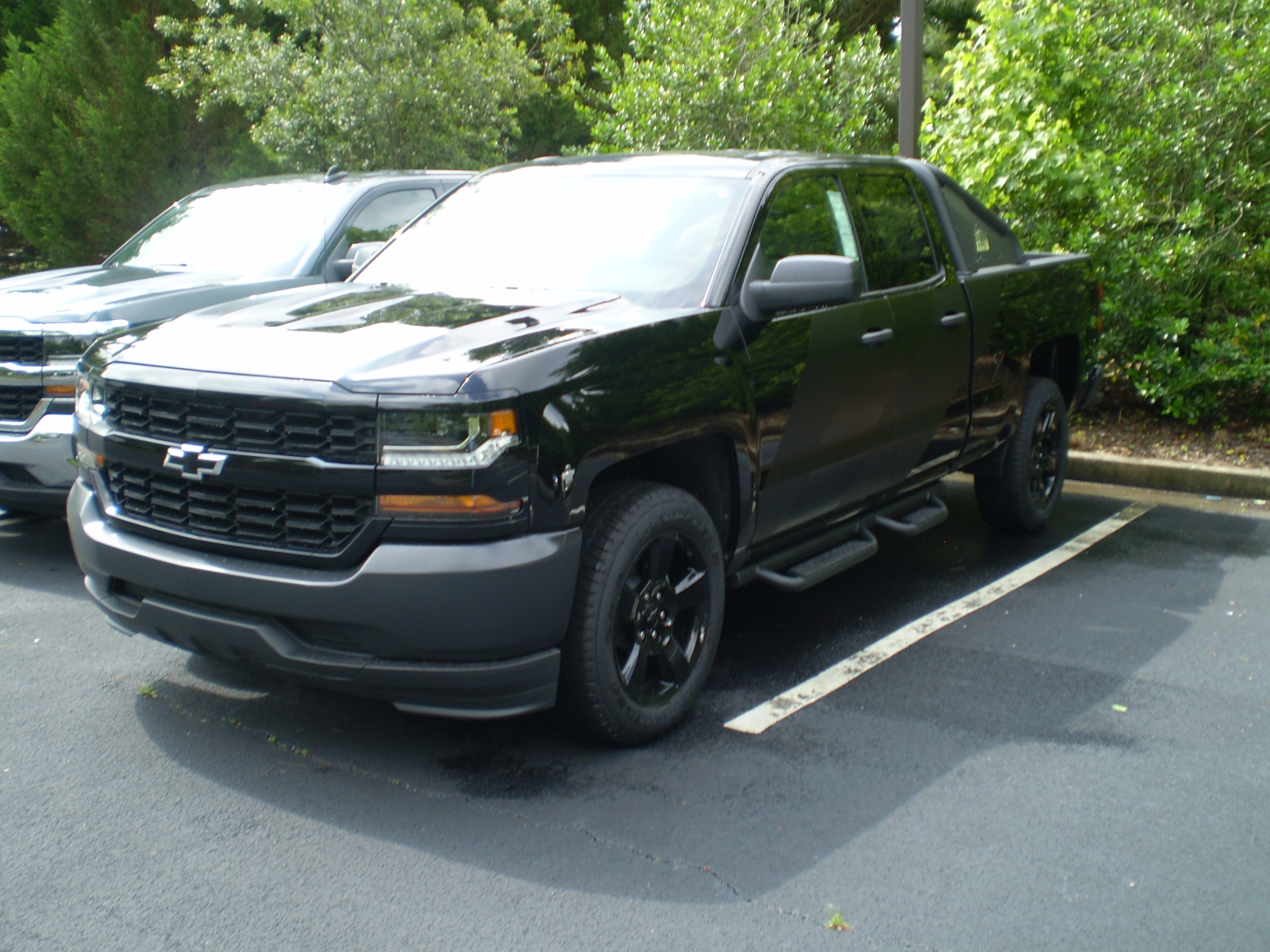
Special Ops Edition

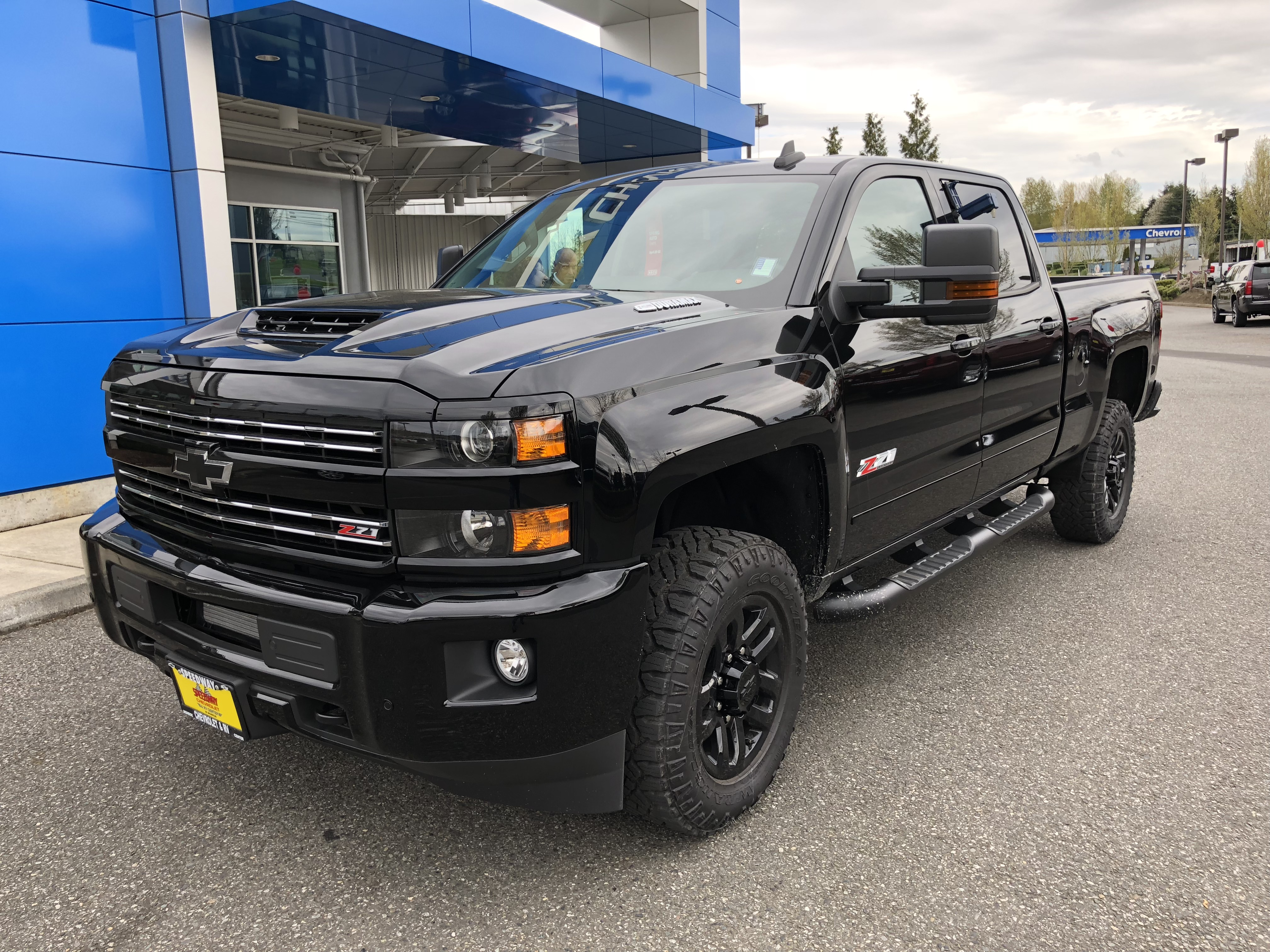
HD Midnight Edition

=== 2019 ===
GM continued production of the third-generation Silverado and fourth-generation Sierra 1500 for 2019, which was sold alongside the new fourth-generation 2019 Silverado and fifth-generation Sierra 1500. Renamed the Chevrolet Silverado LD ("LD" for Light Duty) and GMC Sierra Limited, production of the previous-generation truck moved from Fort Wayne, Indiana, to Oshawa Car Assembly, Ontario, Canada. Only available in the Double Cab configuration, with the 5.3L V8 engine, and in the WT, Custom, and LT trims for the Silverado, or base and SLE trims for the Sierra, the Silverado LD and Sierra Limited ended production in December 2019.

In retrospect, the first-generation Chevrolet Silverado and second-generation GMC Sierra 1500 was sold alongside its predecessor, the fourth-generation C/K 1500, for 1999, with the predecessor only being available with the V8 gasoline engine, automatic transmission, and the three-door extended cab/short bed configuration. It was also sold alongside the new-style second-generation Silverado for the 2007 model year as the Silverado Classic. GMC also offered their previous-generation Sierra models as the Sierra Classic for 1999 and 2007.

On 2500HD, the regular cab model was only offered in Work Truck/Base trim with 4×4, and the Double Cab model was offered in Work Truck/Base or LT/SLE trim with 4×4 on both bed lengths or 4×2 only on the long bed. On 3500HD, regular cab and Double Cab pickups were dropped. The diesel engine was only offered on crew cab pickups and 3500HD chassis-cab models.

=== Engines ===
Model	Year	Engine	Power	Torque
1500	2014–2018	4.3 L LV3 GM EcoTec3 4300 V6	285 hp (213 kW; 289 PS) at 5300 rpm	305 lb⋅ft (414 N⋅m; 42 kg⋅m) at 3900 rpm
1500	2014–2019	5.3 L L83 GM EcoTec3 5300 V8	355 hp (265 kW; 360 PS) at 5600 rpm	383 lb⋅ft (519 N⋅m; 53 kg⋅m) at 4100 rpm
1500	2016–2018	5.3 L L8B GM EcoTec3 5300 V8 (eAssist)	355 hp (265 kW; 360 PS) at 5600 rpm	383 lb⋅ft (519 N⋅m; 53 kg⋅m) at 4100 rpm
1500	2014–2018	6.2 L L86 GM EcoTec3 6200 V8	420 hp (313 kW; 426 PS) at 5600 rpm	460 lb⋅ft (624 N⋅m; 64 kg⋅m) at 4100 rpm
HD	2015–2019	6.0 L L96 Vortec 6000 V8	360 hp (268 kW; 365 PS) at 5400 rpm	380 lb⋅ft (515 N⋅m; 53 kg⋅m) at 4400 rpm
HD	2015–2016	6.6 L LML Duramax V8	397 hp (296 kW; 403 PS) at 3200 rpm	765 lb⋅ft (1,037 N⋅m; 106 kg⋅m) at 1600 rpm
HD	2017–2019	6.6 L L5P Duramax V8	445 hp (332 kW; 451 PS) at 2800 rpm	910 lb⋅ft (1,234 N⋅m; 126 kg⋅m) at 1600 rpm

== Fourth-generation Silverado / fifth-generation Sierra (GMT T1XX; 2019) ==
Fourth generation
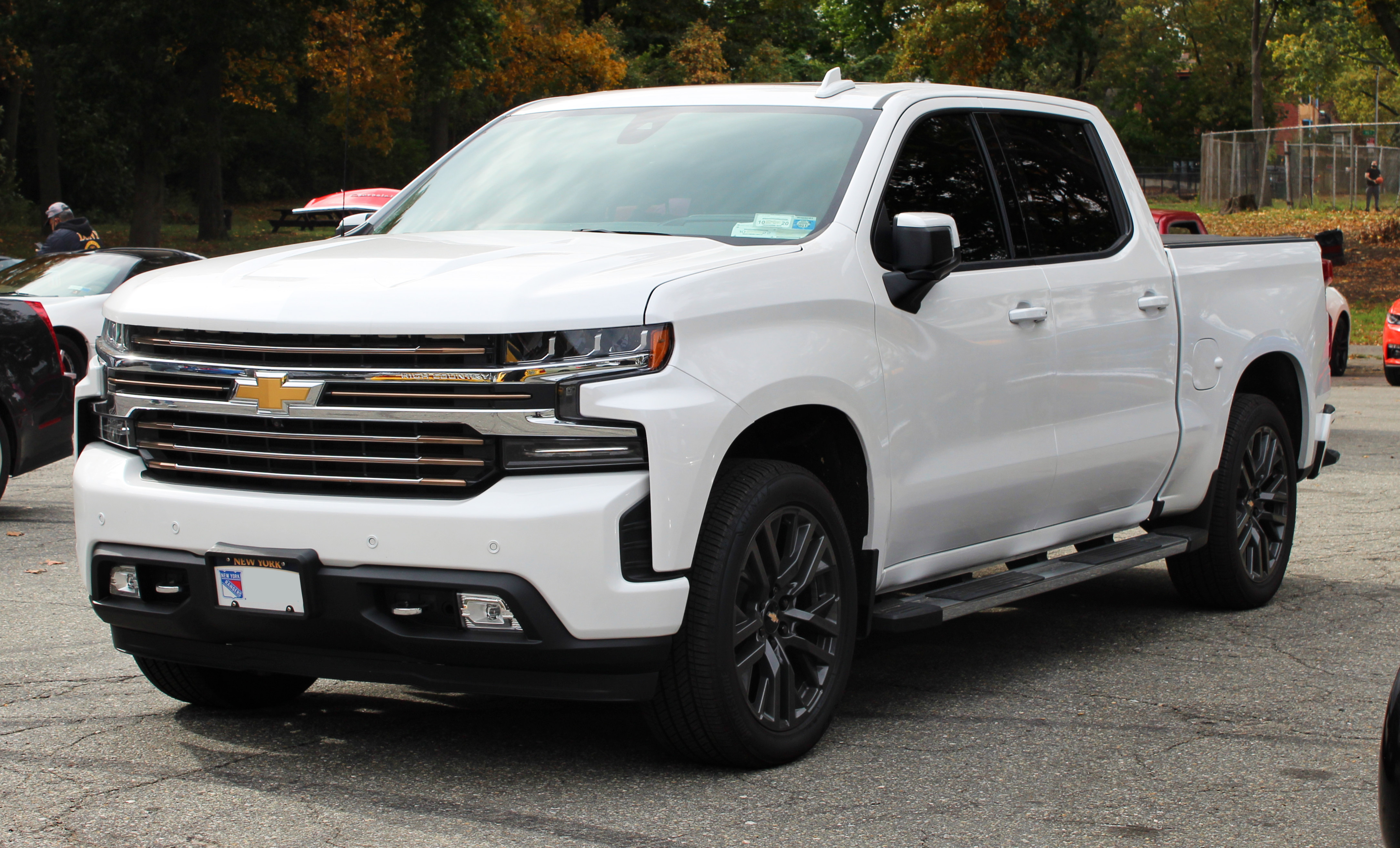
- 2020 Chevrolet Silverado 1500 High Country

Overview
- Also called: HSV Chevrolet Silverado (Australia); GMSV Chevrolet Silverado (Australia)
- Production: July 2018 – present (1500); May 2019 – present (2500, 3500)
- Model years: 2019–2026 (1500); 2020–present (2500, 3500)
- Assembly: United States: Roanoke, Indiana (Fort Wayne Assembly); Flint, Michigan (Flint Truck Assembly); Canada: Oshawa, Ontario (Oshawa Car Assembly); Mexico: Silao, Guanajuato (Silao Assembly); Australia: Melbourne, Victoria (GMSV Australia, RHD remanufacturing)
- Designer: Tyler Moffett (2015)

Body and chassis
- Platform: GMT T1XX
- Related: Chevrolet Colorado (third generation)

Powertrain
- Engine: L3B 2.7L Turbocharged I4; LV3 EcoTec3 4.3L V6 (2019–2021); L82 EcoTec3 5.3L V8 (2019-2021); L84 EcoTec3 5.3L V8; L87 EcoTec3 6.2L V8; LM2 Duramax Diesel 3.0L I6; LZ0 Duramax Diesel 3.0L I6
- Transmission: 6-speed MYC 6L80 Automatic (2019–2021); 6-speed 6L90 automatic (2020-2023); 8-speed 8L90 automatic; 10-speed Hydra-Matic 10L80 MF6 automatic; 10-speed Allison 10L1000 MGM/MGU automatic

Dimensions
- Wheelbase: Regular Cab 6'6": 126.5 in (3,213 mm); Regular Cab 8': 139.5 in (3,543 mm); Double Cab 6'6"/Crew Cab 5'8": 147.4 in (3,744 mm); Crew Cab 6'6": 157.0 in (3,988 mm)
- Length: Regular Cab 6'6": 210.7 in (5,352 mm); Regular Cab 8': 229.5 in (5,829 mm); Double Cab 6'6": 231.8 in (5,888 mm); Crew Cab 5'8": 231.7 in (5,885 mm); Crew Cab 6'6": 241.2 in (6,126 mm)
- Width: 81.2 in (2,062 mm)
- Height: 75.4–75.8 in (1,920–1,930 mm); 78.2–78.5 in (1,990–1,990 mm) (Trail Boss)
- Curb weight: Silverado 1500; 4,474–4,686 lb (2,029–2,126 kg) (Regular Cab); 4,793–5,007 lb (2,174–2,271 kg) (Double Cab); 4,798–5,008 lb (2,176–2,272 kg) (Crew Cab)

On December 16, 2017, Chevrolet unveiled the fourth-generation 2019 Silverado 1500 during the Chevy Truck Centennial Celebration Weekend at Texas Motor Speedway in Fort Worth, Texas. The debut of the all-new Silverado was not expected until early 2018. For its debut, the Silverado 1500 was airlifted via a helicopter onto a stage, where it was introduced to a crowd of Chevrolet truck owners and enthusiasts, as well as to the automotive press. Chevrolet NASCAR driver Dale Earnhardt Jr. also spoke at the event. In addition to the reveal of the 2019 Silverado 1500, multiple Chevrolet trucks of different generations were on display as well.

The model shown at the reveal was the 2019 Chevrolet Silverado 1500 LT Trail Boss, an all-new trim level added to the lineup, and is a factory-modified version of the Silverado 1500 LT Z71. Distinguishing features of the Trail Boss from other Silverado 1500 trim levels are its gloss black front fascia, black rear step bumper, black Chevrolet "bow-tie" emblems on the front grille and rear tailgate, 18-inch gloss black-finished aluminum-alloy wheels, large off-road tires, altered suspension, "Trail Boss" decals on the sides of the bed, front bumper-mounted center fog lamps, "Z71" emblems on each front fender, and red-painted front tow hooks.

The formal unveiling of the Silverado 1500 took place at the 2018 North American International Auto Show in Detroit, Michigan on January 13, 2018, exactly 100 years after Chevrolet delivered its first trucks to customers on January 13, 1918. The model was unveiled as a Silverado LT Trail Boss model.

Sales to customers began in August 2018 as an early 2019 model year vehicle with a base price of $32,200 MSRP.

The Silverado 1500 features a more sculpted exterior design, with headlamps that integrate into the grille (similar to more recent Ford trucks), and the former also incorporates LED Daytime Running Accent Lamps (DRLs). Coincidentally, both brought in an all-new 10-speed automatic transmission.

For the 2020 model year, the Silverado 1500 has been launched in Australia for the first time. Holden Special Vehicles (replaced by General Motors Specialty Vehicles since 2021) has started the conversion to right-hand-drive and Australian Design Rules. The 6.2L V8 engine is the sole engine choice at the launch.

=== Trims ===
As of 2019, the Silverado 1500 was planned to be available in eight distinct trim levels: WT, Custom, Custom Trail Boss, LT, RST, LT Trail Boss, LTZ, and High Country.

All trim levels include a next-generation touchscreen infotainment system with Apple CarPlay and Android Auto, Bluetooth for hands-free calling and wireless audio streaming via A2DP, power windows and door locks (on Double and Crew Cab models), air conditioning, and a rearview backup camera system. Additional features available on select trim levels include GPS navigation, SiriusXM Satellite Radio and Travel Link, OnStar with 4G LTE in-vehicle Wi-Fi, a Bose premium audio system with seven speakers, keyless access and push-button start, a remote starter system, heated and ventilated luxury leather-trimmed seating surfaces, a heated leather-wrapped steering wheel, driver-assist technologies, a multi-angle camera system, and heated rear seats.

=== Special Editions ===
For 2020, the Rally and Midnight Special Editions returned after being absent for the 2019 model year. Rally Edition was available on the Silverado Custom and RST trims. The package featured black Rally Stripes on the hood and tailgate, black CHEVROLET tailgate lettering, and black assist steps. The Midnight Edition featured Bucket Seats with Console, special headlamp bezels, black dual exhaust tips, and black assist steps. The Midnight Edition was only available on the LT Trail Boss trim level.

Also in 2020, Chevrolet and Realtree announced that there would be a 2021 Silverado 1500 Realtree Edition. This was the second time Chevrolet and Realtree teamed up to produce a special edition Silverado, having done so in 2016. The 2021 model was based on a Silverado 1500 Custom Trail Boss in Crew Cab Short Box configuration, adding 20-inch black wheels and Realtree camouflage graphics inside and out. Ultimately, only seven examples came to exist to the public in the United States.

=== Engines ===
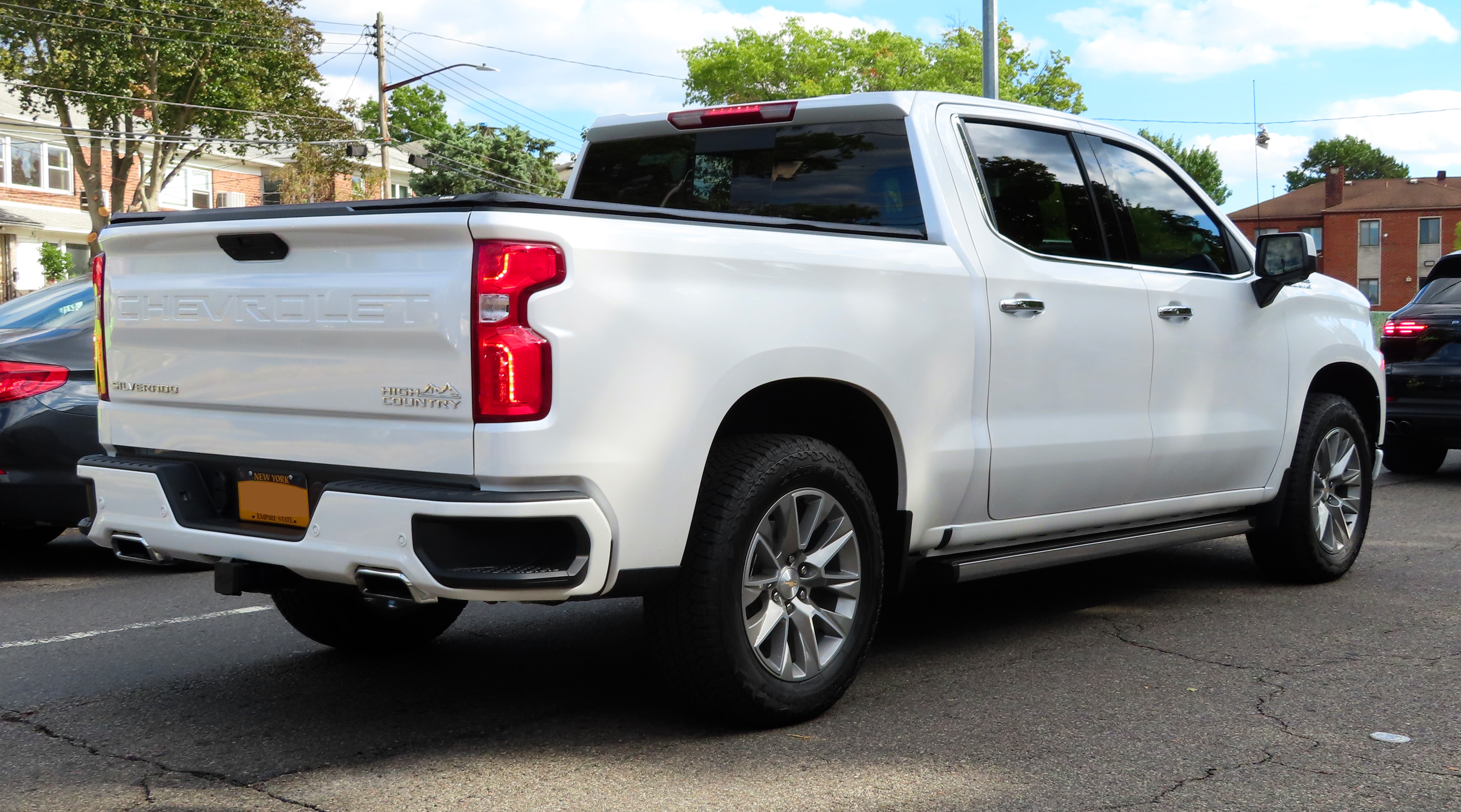
Rear view

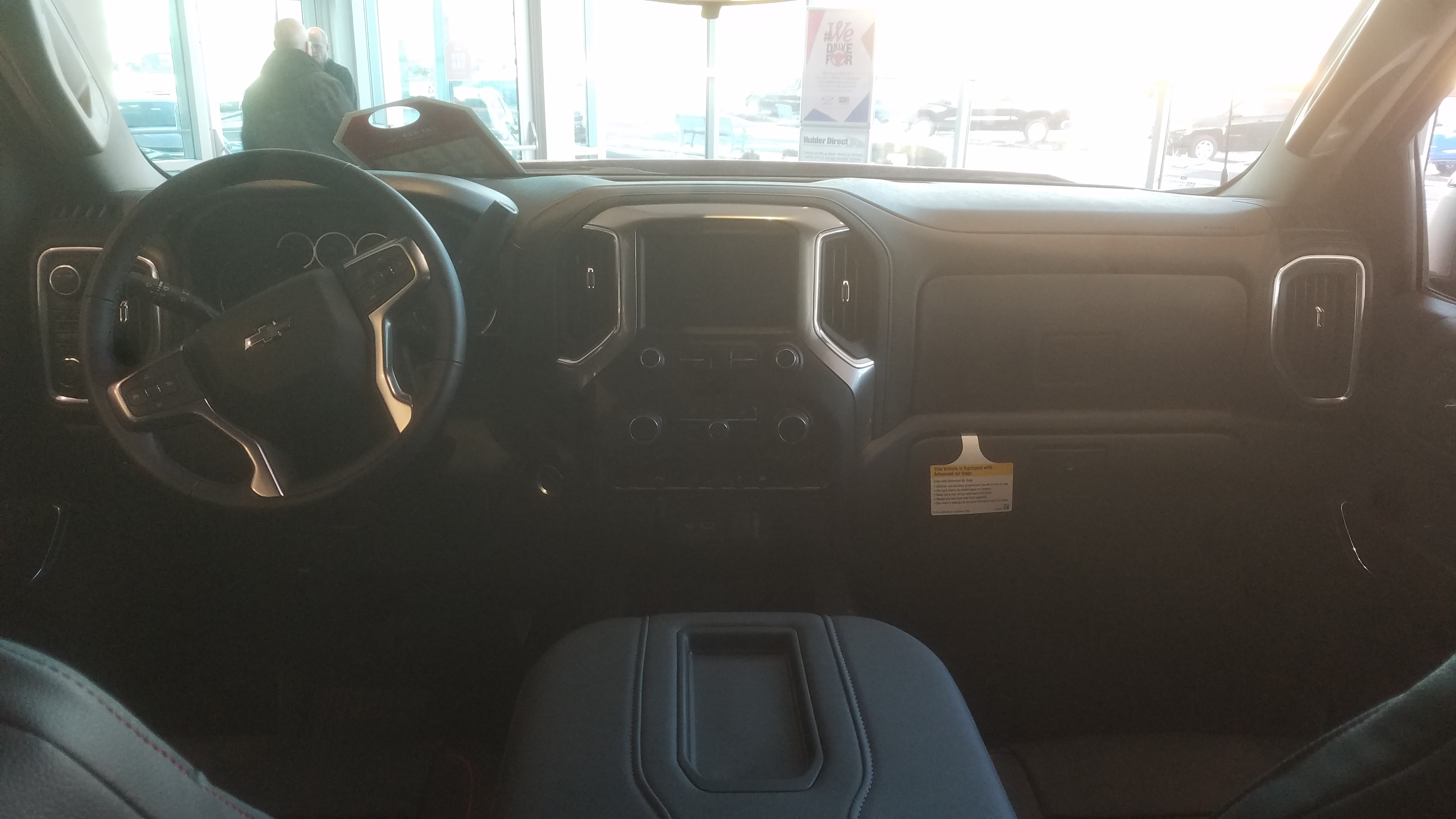
Interior

The 2019 Silverado and Sierra 1500 offered a choice of six different engine options, dependent upon trim level. The base engine on lower trim levels (WT and Custom) was the 285-horsepower (213 kW; 289 PS), 4.3-liter EcoTec3 V6 gasoline engine; this was dropped for 2022.

Standard on mid-level trims is a new, 310-horsepower (231 kW; 314 PS), 2.7-liter turbocharged inline-four gasoline engine (thus being the smallest engine available on a GM full-size half-ton pickup), and features cylinder deactivation for improved fuel economy. For 2022, the engine's torque rating was upgraded from 348 lb-ft to 420 lb-ft, and for 2024, the engine was renamed TurboMax, with trucks receiving TurboMax badges on both sides of the hood.

Optional on most trim levels is the 355-horsepower (265 kW; 360 PS), 5.3-liter EcoTec3 V8 gasoline engine, which is optionally E85 capable, and features either a carryover Active Fuel Management (AFM) system, or a brand-new Dynamic Fuel Management system (DFM), which now can shut off two, three, four, five, or six of eight cylinders. The availability of either AFM or DFM is dependent on trim level, with WT and Custom trucks available with AFM, and LT and above trucks standard with DFM.

Optional on upper-level trims is a 420-horsepower (313 kW; 426 PS), 6.2-liter EcoTec3 V8 gasoline engine with Dynamic Fuel Management (DFM). For 2020, availability of both the 6.2-liter EcoTec3 V8 gasoline engine and the 10-speed automatic transmission expanded to most Silverado 1500 and Sierra 1500 trim levels. The 6.2-liter V8 is only available on 4WD models.

A new, 277-horsepower (207 kW; 281 PS) 3.0-liter turbocharged Duramax I6 engine became available for the 2020 model year. Availability of this engine had been delayed because of EPA certification. For 2023, the Duramax engine received an upgrade to 305 horsepower and 495 lb-ft of torque.

All engines are paired to either a six-, eight-, or 10-speed automatic transmission, with a choice of either two-wheel-drive or four-wheel-drive (the latter being standard equipment on Trail Boss, ZR2, and AT4 trims), and optional on all other Silverado 1500 and Sierra 1500 models).

According to EPA ratings, 2WD 2019 Silverado models with the 2.7-liter turbo inline-4 engine can achieve 20 mpg_{‑US} (12 L/100 km; 24 mpg_{‑imp}; 8.5 km/L)/23 mpg_{‑US} (10 L/100 km; 28 mpg_{‑imp}; 9.8 km/L) city/highway.

Model	Year	Engine	Power	Torque
1500	2019–2021	4.3 L LV3 GM EcoTec3 4300 V6	285 hp (213 kW; 289 PS) @ 5300 rpm	305 lb⋅ft (414 N⋅m; 42 kg⋅m) @ 3900 rpm
1500	2019–2021	2.7 L L3B Turbocharged I4	310 hp (231 kW; 314 PS) @ 5600 rpm	348 lb⋅ft (472 N⋅m; 48 kg⋅m) @ 1500 rpm
1500	2022–	2.7 L L3B Turbocharged High Output I4	310 hp (231 kW; 314 PS) @ 5600 rpm	420 lb⋅ft (569 N⋅m; 58 kg⋅m) @ 1500 rpm
1500	2020–2022	3.0 L LM2 Duramax I6	277 hp (207 kW; 281 PS) @ 3750 rpm	460 lb⋅ft (624 N⋅m; 64 kg⋅m) @ 1500 rpm
1500	2023–	3.0 L LZ0 Duramax I6	305 hp (227 kW; 309 PS) @ 3750 rpm	495 lb⋅ft (671 N⋅m; 68 kg⋅m) @ 1500 rpm
1500	2019–2021	5.3 L L82 GM EcoTec3 5300 V8	355 hp (265 kW; 360 PS) @ 5600 rpm	383 lb⋅ft (519 N⋅m; 53 kg⋅m) @ 4100 rpm
1500	2019–	5.3 L L84 GM Ecotec3 5300 w/DFM V8	355 hp (265 kW; 360 PS) @ 5600 rpm	383 lb⋅ft (519 N⋅m; 53 kg⋅m) @ 4100 rpm
1500	2019–	6.2 L L87 GM EcoTec3 6200 w/DFM V8	420 hp (313 kW; 426 PS) @ 5600 rpm	460 lb⋅ft (624 N⋅m; 64 kg⋅m) @ 4100 rpm
2500HD/3500HD	2020–2026	6.6 L L8T V8	401 hp (299 kW; 407 PS) @ 5200 rpm	464 lb⋅ft (629 N⋅m; 64 kg⋅m) @ 4000 rpm
2500HD/3500HD	2027–	6.6 L L8S V8	412 hp (307 kW; 418 PS) @ 5200 rpm	472 lb⋅ft (640 N⋅m; 65 kg⋅m) @ 4000 rpm
2500HD/3500HD	2020–2023	6.6 L L5P Duramax V8	445 hp (332 kW; 451 PS) @ 2800 rpm	910 lb⋅ft (1,234 N⋅m; 126 kg⋅m) @ 1600 rpm
2500HD/3500HD	2024–2026	6.6 L L5P Duramax V8	470 hp (350 kW; 477 PS) @ 2800 rpm	975 lb⋅ft (1,322 N⋅m; 135 kg⋅m) @ 1600 rpm
2500HD/3500HD	2027–	8.3 L L6P Duramax V8	555 hp (414 kW; 563 PS) @ 2500 rpm	1,230 lb⋅ft (1,668 N⋅m; 170 kg⋅m) @ 1400 rpm

=== Infotainment system ===
Standard features include a next-generation infotainment system with Apple CarPlay and Android Auto. The Waze mobile app can now be compatible in its infotainment system through the use of CarPlay.

A seven-inch infotainment system is standard on Chevrolet Silverado 1500 WT, Custom, and Custom Trail Boss models, as well as the GMC Sierra 1500 Base (Sierra) model, while an eight-inch infotainment system is standard on the Silverado 1500 LT, LT Trail Boss, RST, LTZ, and High Country models, as well as the Sierra 1500 SLE, SLT, AT4, and Denali. SiriusXM satellite radio, OnStar with 4G LTE Wi-Fi, a seven-speaker Bose premium audio system, HD Radio, GPS navigation, SiriusXM Travel Link, and a multi-angle camera system are all available depending upon the trim level selected. For 2020, Silverado and Sierra models add SiriusXM 360L compatibility.

=== Payload and towing ===
Crew cab Silverado models increased in payload by up to 14 percent, or 340 pounds (150 kg).

Trailering features equipped for the 2019 model included an industry-first VIN-specific trailering and payload label and an in-vehicle towing app on its GM infotainment system.

=== Variants ===
==== Chevrolet Silverado HD ====
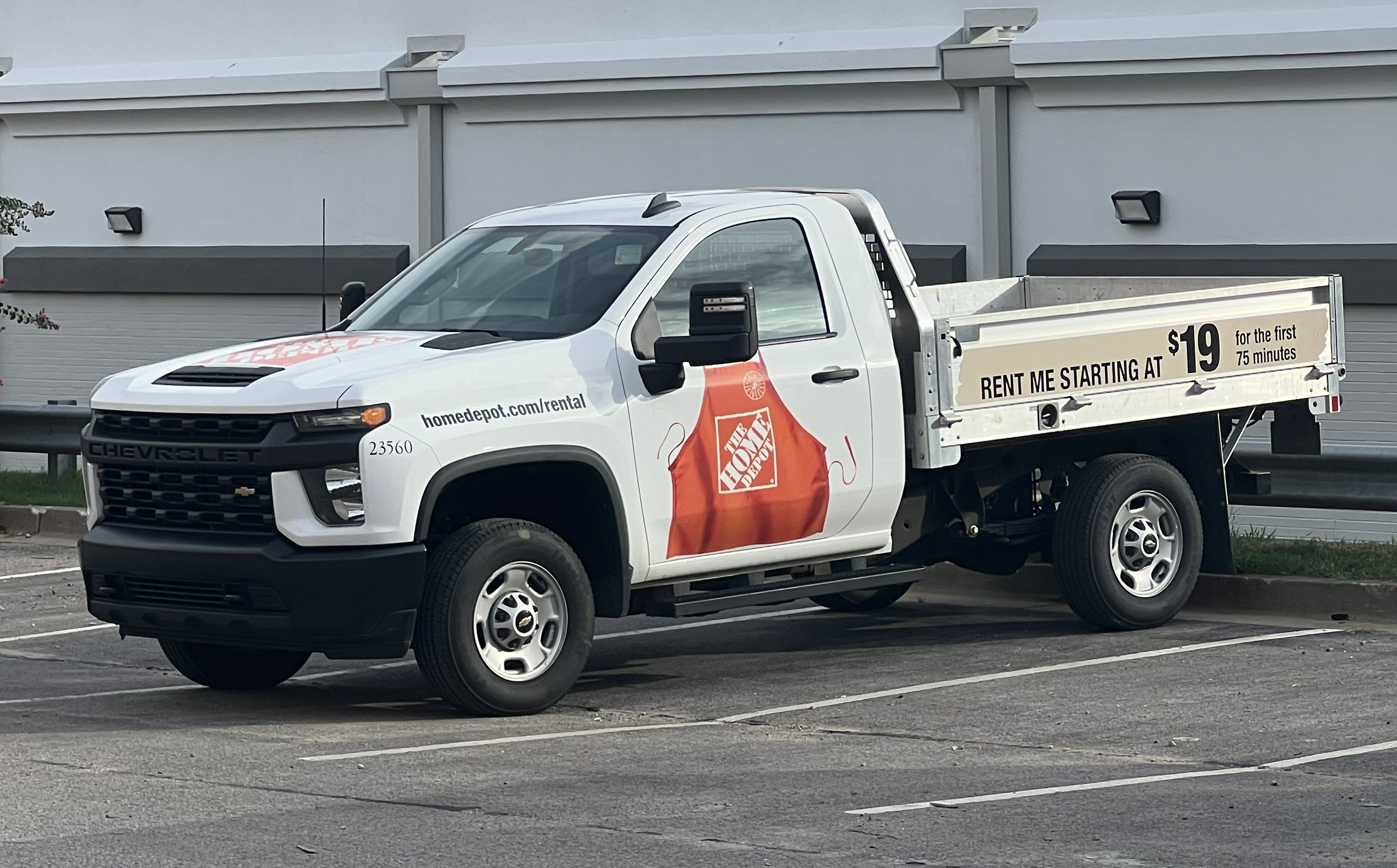
Silverado HD Regular Cab

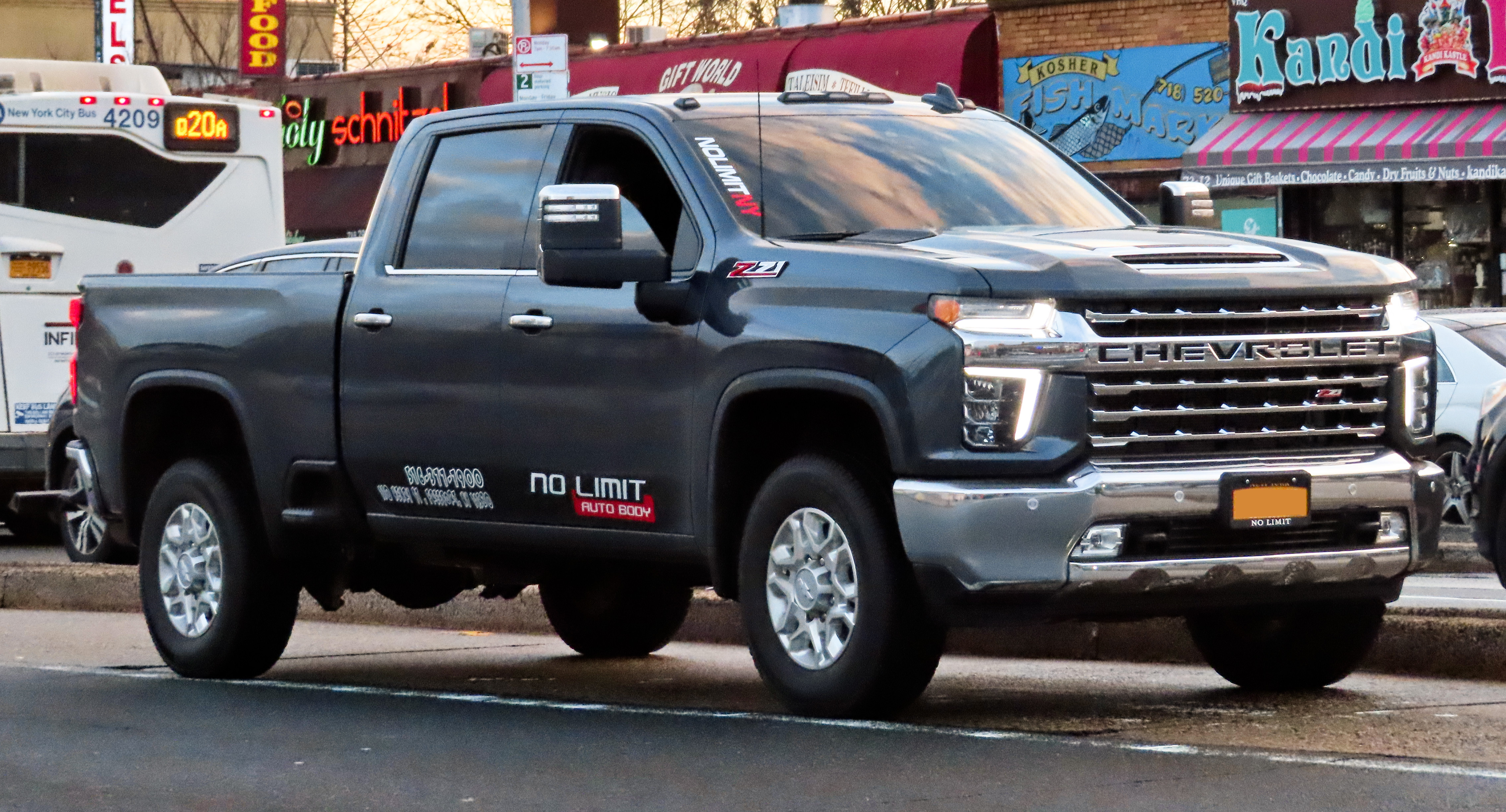
Silverado HD LTZ Crew Cab

Chevrolet released three new 2020 Silverado models, including the Silverado 2500 HD and 3500 HD, in 2019. Chevrolet debuted the truck at GM's Flint Truck Assembly plant on February 5, 2019. The trucks had made their arrival at the dealerships in the late summer of 2019.

=== Payload and towing ===
The 2020 Silverado 3500 HD can tow up to 35,500 pounds (16,100 kg) in a regular cab, dual rear wheel configuration with the Duramax 6.6L L5P turbodiesel V8 engine.

=== GMC Sierra ===
The fifth-generation GMC Sierra was unveiled in Detroit on March 1, 2018. The Sierra 1500 differentiates itself from its Chevrolet Silverado 1500 counterpart by offering unique features, such as a two-piece tailgate, a pickup bed constructed from carbon fiber, a 3-by-7-inch (7.6 cm × 17.8 cm) multi-color head-up display, a rearview mirror backup camera system, and a luxury Denali trim level. The Sierra 1500 also features its own distinct exterior styling, though interior styling is similar to that of the Chevrolet Silverado 1500.

There are six functions of GMC Sierra's Multi-Pro Tailgate, including a primary tailgate load stop for large items. Its inner tailgate can be a load stopper, a full-width step, and a work area by dropping down the load stop or provide easy access to the bed just by folding down the inner tailgate.

Powertrains include improved versions of the current 5.3-liter and 6.2-liter EcoTec3 V8 gasoline engines, as well as the same 3.0-liter Duramax turbocharged diesel I6 engine that is also available in the 2019 Chevrolet Silverado 1500. An all-new, ten-speed automatic transmission comes as standard equipment on gasoline-powered Sierra 1500 models. Availability of the previous 4.3-liter EcoTec3 V6 gasoline engine was not announced at launch.

All trim levels included a next-generation touch screen infotainment system with Apple CarPlay and Android Auto, Bluetooth for hands-free calling and wireless audio streaming via A2DP, power windows and door locks (on Double and Crew Cab models), air conditioning, and a rearview backup camera system. Additional features available on select trim levels included GPS navigation, SiriusXM Satellite Radio and Travel Link, OnStar with 4G LTE in-vehicle Wi-Fi, a Bose premium audio system with seven speakers, keyless access and push-button start, a remote starter system, heated and ventilated luxury leather-trimmed seating surfaces, a heated leather-wrapped steering wheel, driver-assist technologies, a multi-angle camera system, and heated rear seats.

The 2019 GMC Sierra went on sale in September 2018 as an early 2019 model year vehicle at GMC dealerships nationwide. The Sierra 1500 was planned to launch in Australia and New Zealand in the third quarter of 2024 and assembled at GMSV Australia RHD Conversion.

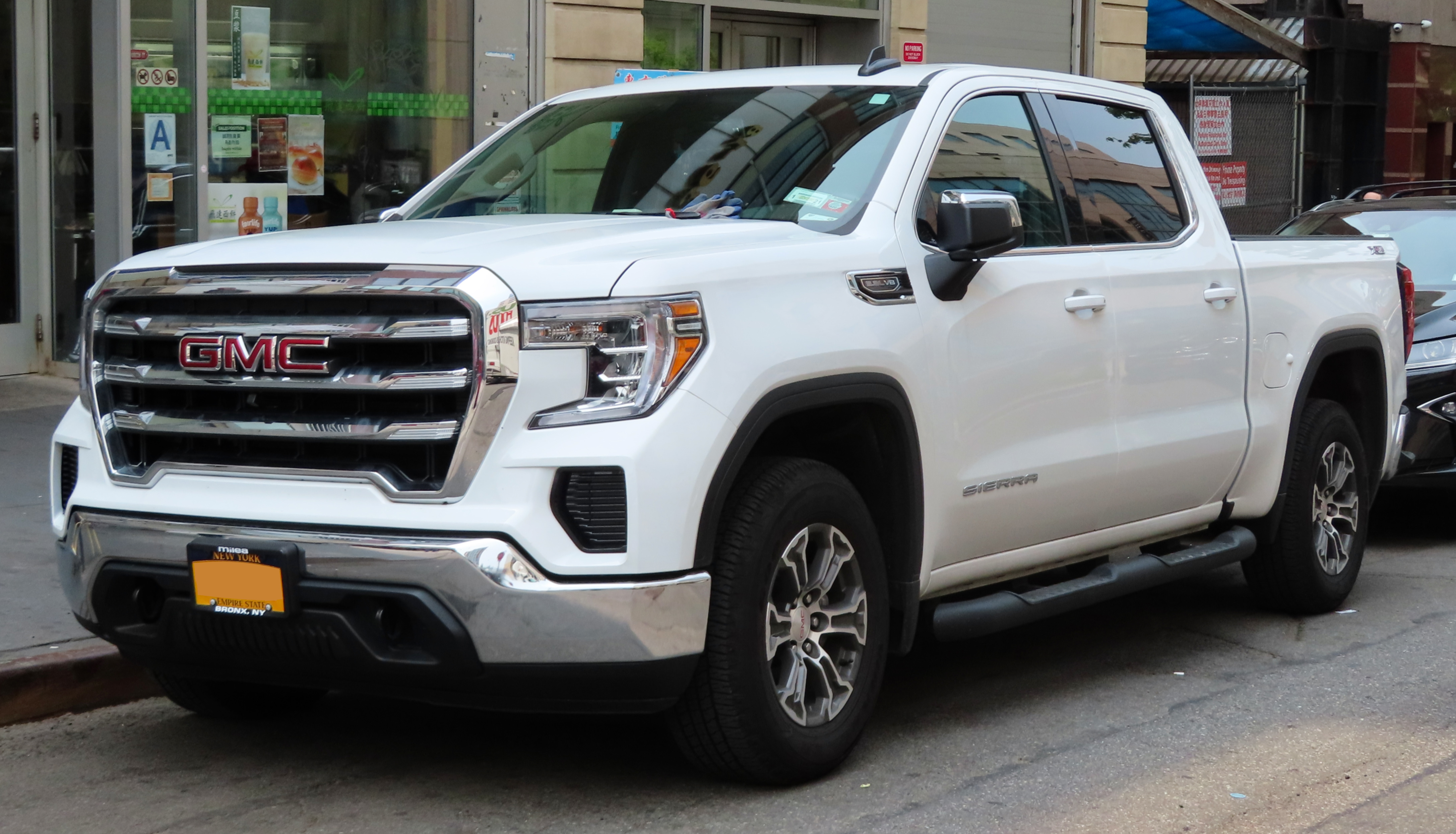
Sierra 1500 SLE

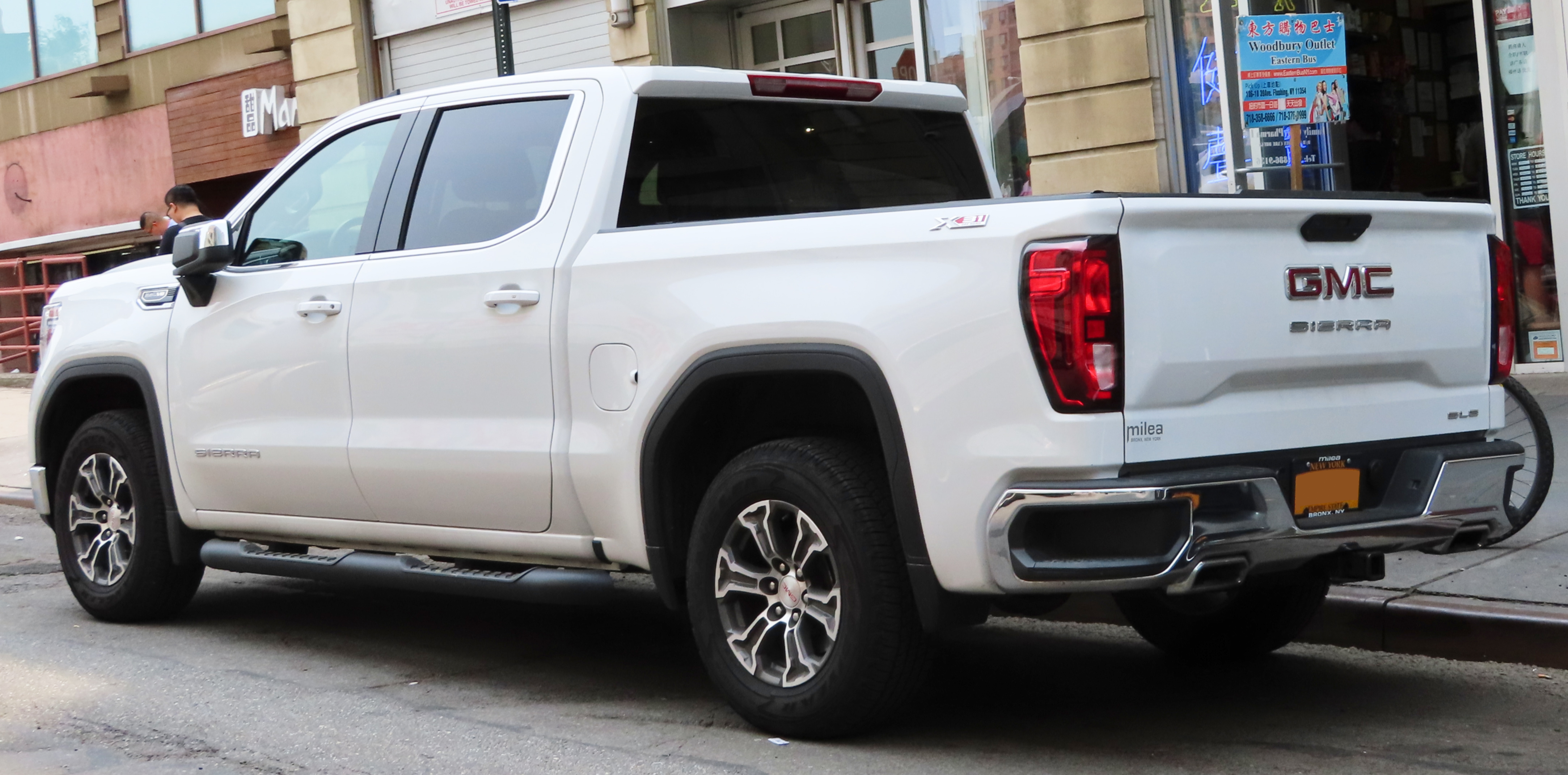
Sierra 1500 SLE rear

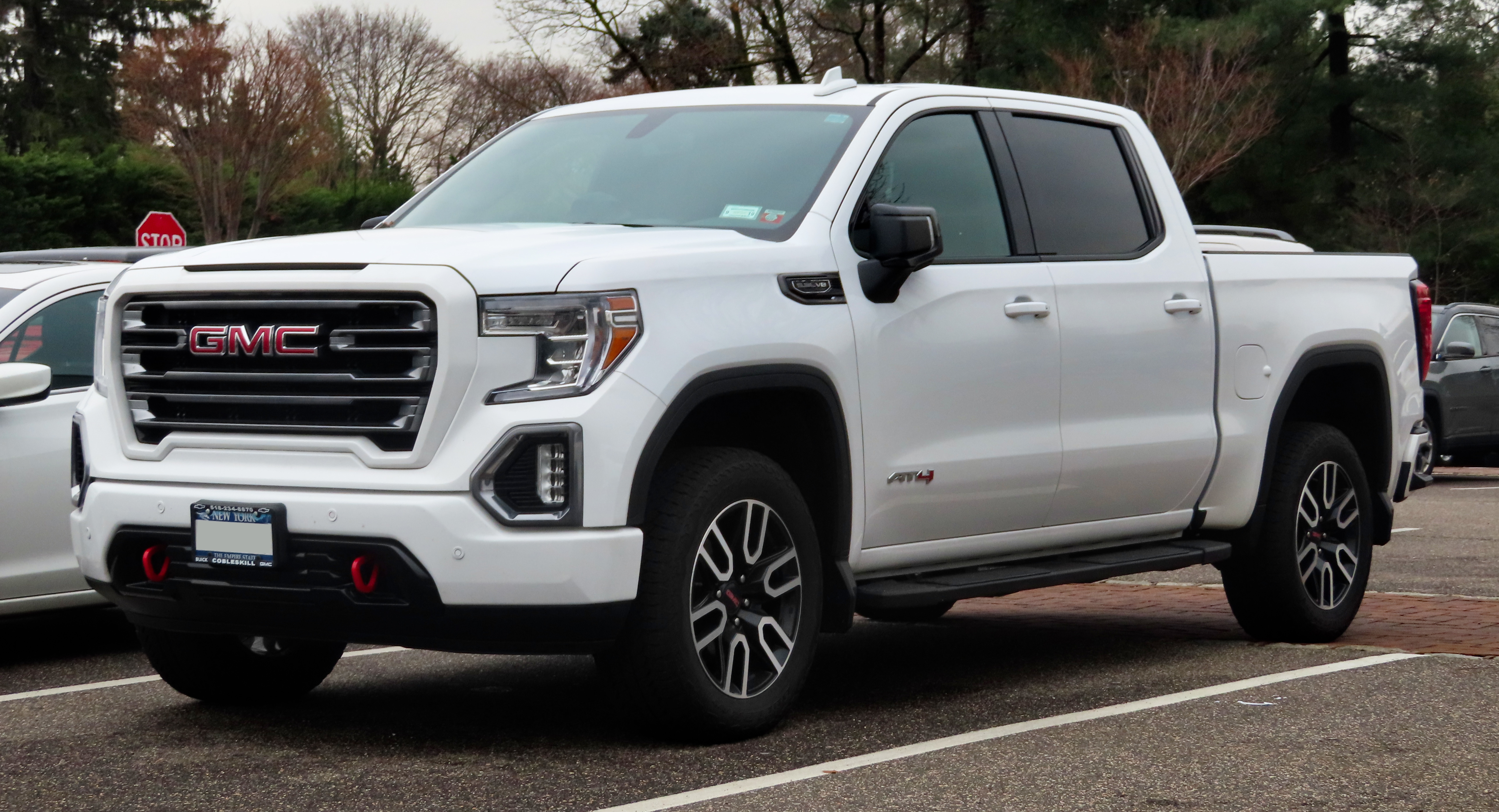
Sierra 1500 AT4

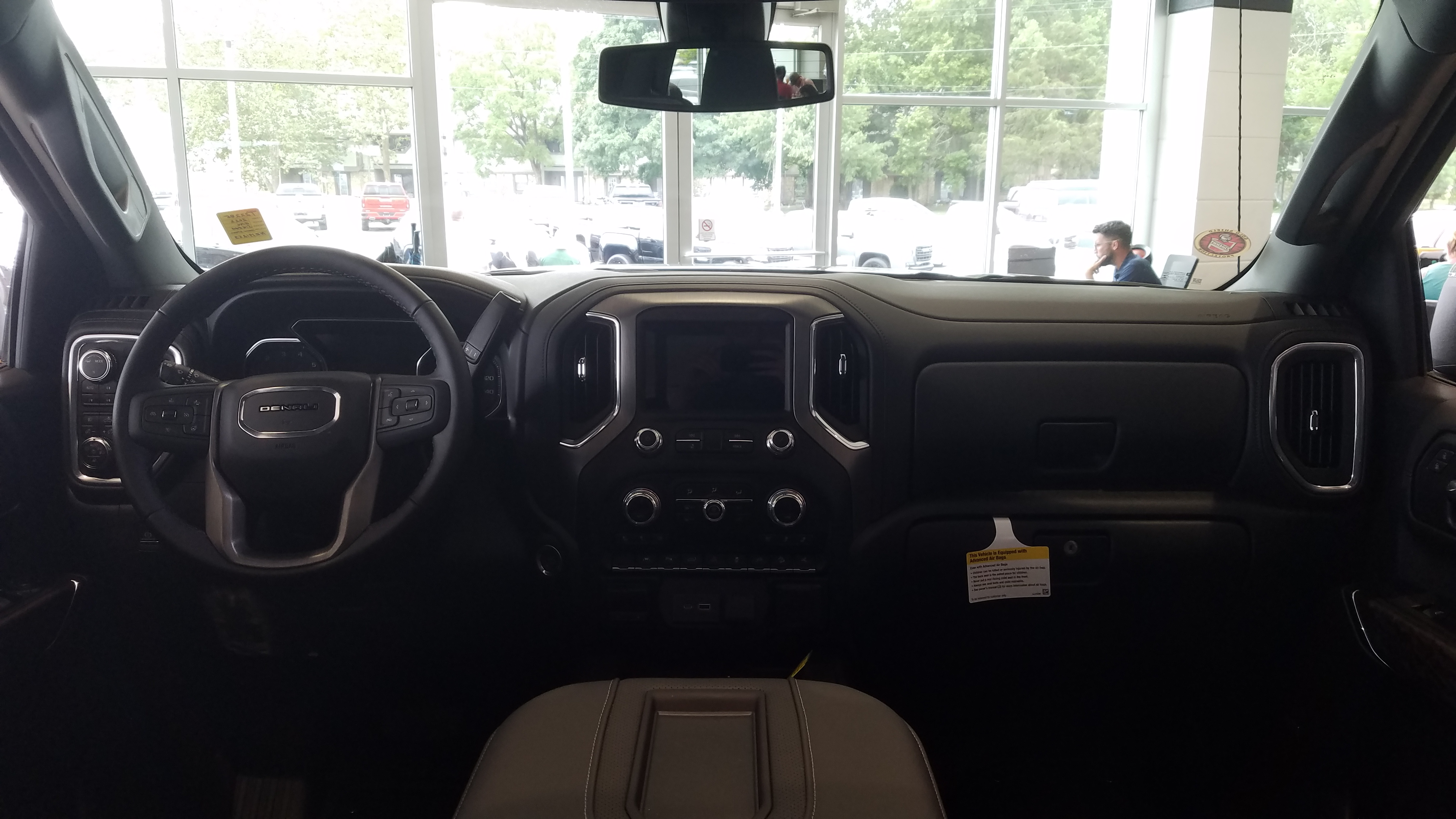
Sierra 1500 Denali interior

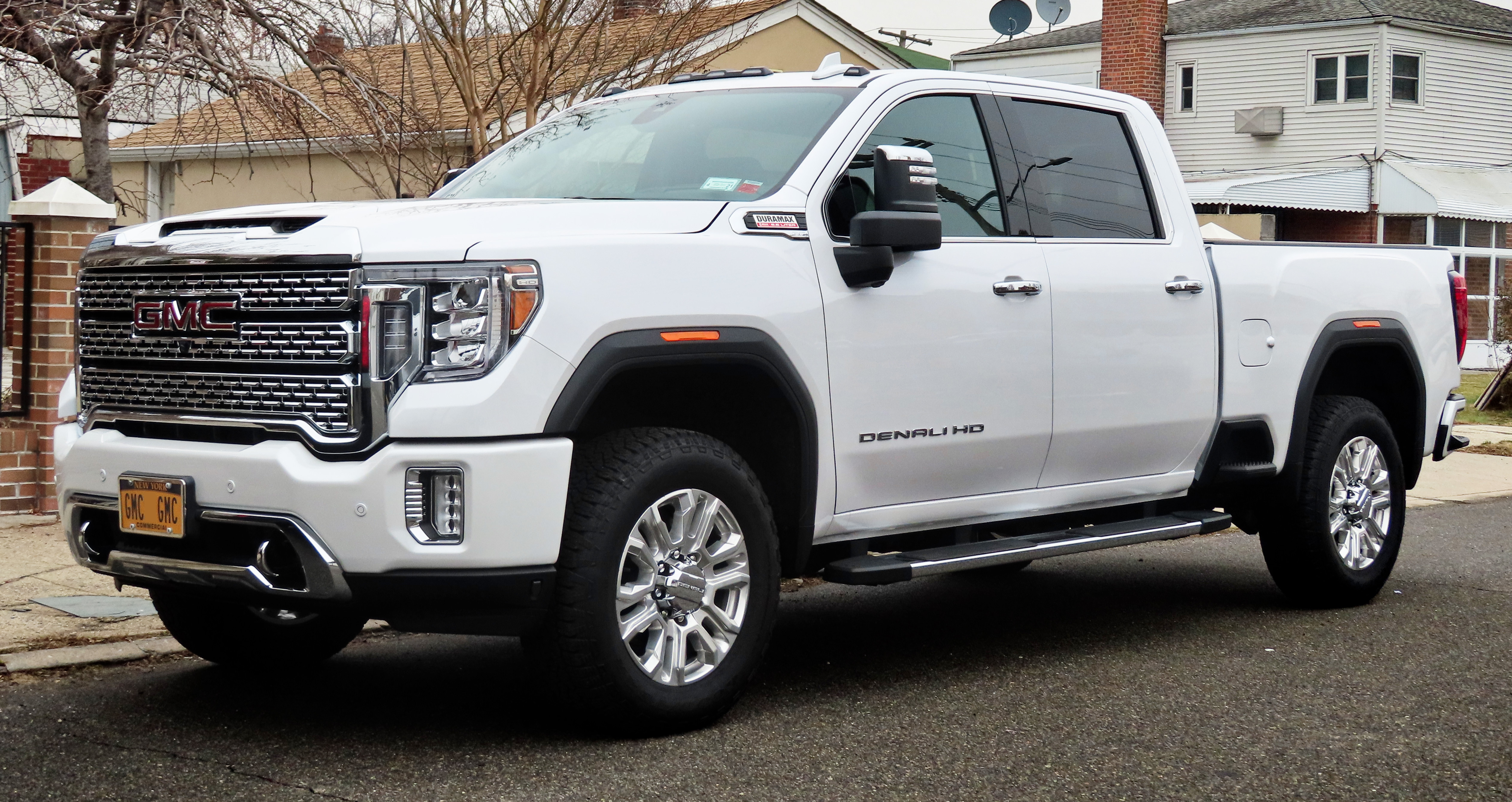
Sierra 2500 Denali

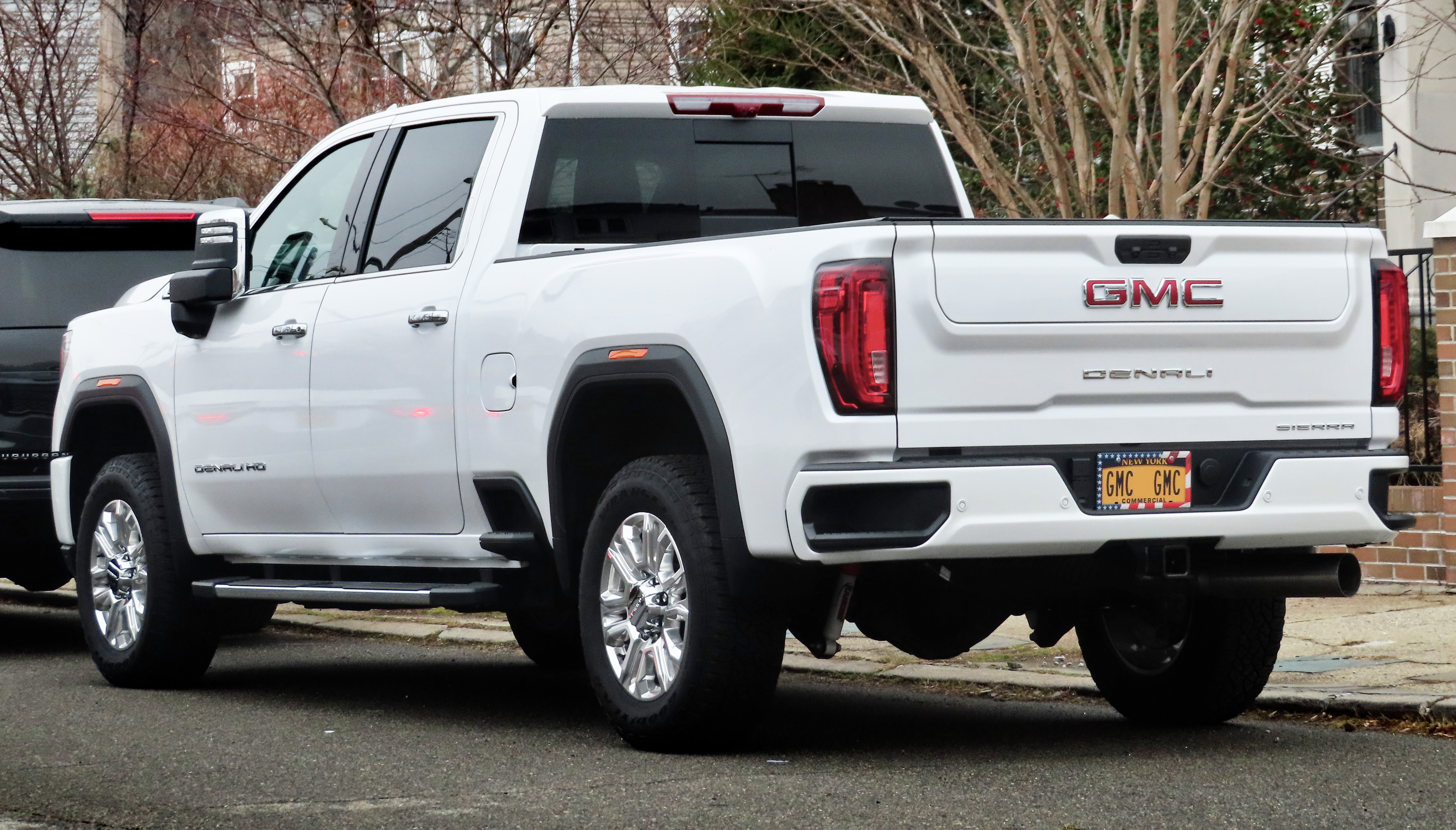
Sierra 2500 Denali rear

=== Regular Cab ===
Not initially available at launch, the 2019 Chevrolet Silverado 1500 and GMC Sierra 1500 regular cab configuration went on sale in early 2019. Initially only available with an 8-foot (2.4 m) pickup box, with a choice of two-wheel-drive or four-wheel-drive and the 4.3-liter EcoTec3 V6 or 5.3-liter V8 gasoline engines, the regular cab is exclusively available in the WT trim (1WT) for Silverado 1500, or the Sierra (1SA) trim for Sierra 1500. The regular cab option is not available in other trim levels in the United States and Canada, as these trucks are geared mainly towards fleet and commercial buyers. The 1500 Regular Cab Long Box model is also available from the factory without a bed (i.e., as a chassis cab), but only with the 5.3 L V8 engine. Although regular cab models with a 6.5-foot (2.0 m) bed and in higher trim levels are produced, they are only available for sale in Mexico and the Middle East. Starting in 2022, regular cab models with a 6.5-foot (2.0 m) bed were made available in the United States and Canada, albeit only in WT trim and with the 2.7-liter L4 engine.

Standard features include a black front grille, black front and rear bumpers, 17-inch steel wheels, manual windows and door locks, manual black side mirrors, a seven-inch touchscreen infotainment system with rearview backup camera and Apple CarPlay and Android Auto smartphone integration, vinyl seating surfaces, a split front bench seat, vinyl flooring, and air conditioning. Options include the Chrome Appearance Group (17-inch aluminum-alloy wheels and chrome front and rear bumpers), OnStar 4G LTE in-vehicle Wi-Fi capabilities, cloth seating surfaces, carpeted flooring with floor mats, and the Power Equipment Group (power windows and door locks, keyless entry, power black side mirrors, and cruise control).

=== 2020 changes ===
The 2020 Silverado saw the deletion of the Oakwood Metallic exterior paint color. Aside from the 3.0 L Duramax, major additions were new vertical trailering mirrors, which include power adjustability, as well as power-folding and power-extension capabilities. Adaptive cruise control was optional on the LTZ and High Country trim levels, and SiriusXM 360L capability was available on LT and higher trims. The Silverado 1500 also deleted the keyless access buttons on the rear doors.

The Sierra saw a new Carbon Black Metallic paint color in addition to the aforementioned Silverado updates.

2020 was the final model year for 1500 Double Cab models in LTZ, SLT, and AT4 trims.

=== 2021 changes ===
For 2021, the Silverado and Sierra pickups saw relatively few changes. Most notably, the Silverado 1500 offered the newly named Multi-Flex six-position tailgate, which was borrowed from the GMC Sierra, and the introduction of wireless CarPlay and Android Auto projection capability. The 2.7-liter 4-cylinder and 3.0-liter Duramax diesel–equipped Silverado and Sierra models saw increased towing capacity ratings and new towing technology, including a jack-knife alert and trailer length indicator. Several colors were changed on the Silverado: Havana Brown Metallic and Cajun Red Tintcoat were replaced by Oxford Brown Metallic and Cherry Red Tintcoat, respectively, while Mosaic Black Metallic was also introduced as a new color. 2021 Sierra models received color changes as well: Deep Mahogany Metallic, Red Quartz Tintcoat, and Carbon Black Metallic were replaced with Brownstone Metallic, Cayenne Red Tintcoat, and Ebony Twilight Metallic, respectively. Smokey Quartz Metallic was removed from the available color options, and Hunter Metallic was added as a new paint color. For the 2021 Sierra, the previously unnamed base "Sierra" trim officially became "Pro".

Forward Collision Alert, Automatic Emergency Braking, and Front Pedestrian Braking options were now available on Silverado WT and Custom trim levels as part of the Safety Confidence Package. Crew Cab Standard Box Sierra 1500 models were now only available in four-wheel drive.

Silverado and Sierra 3500 HD DRW models saw an increase in maximum towing capacity to 36,000 pounds (16,000 kg).

Due to the global microchip shortage, some 2021 Silverado and Sierra vehicles were built without options like automatic start-stop and heated and ventilated front seats, heated outboard rear seats, and heated steering wheel.

=== 2022 changes ===
The 2022 Silverado LTD and Sierra Limited entered the model lineup as a stop-gap measure until production of the newly-refreshed 2022 model began. As such, the 2022 Silverado LTD and Sierra Limited had very few changes from the 2021 models.

Notable changes for the 2022 Limited models included the discontinuation of both the 4.3-liter LV3 EcoTec3 V6 and 5.3-liter L82 EcoTec3 V8 with active fuel management (AFM) gasoline engines, as well as the previous "6L80" six-speed automatic transmission, leaving only the eight- and 10-speed available. The Custom trim level was only available with the 2.7-liter L4 engine. The LT Trail Boss trim-level (Chevrolet) was now available with the 3.0-liter Duramax turbodiesel engine. The 5.3L V8 is now no longer available on the Sierra 1500 Limited AT4.

=== 2022 refresh ===
For the 2022 model year, the Chevrolet Silverado 1500 and GMC Sierra 1500 receives a mid-cycle refresh that includes the following new trim levels for the Chevrolet Silverado, called the ZR2, and for the GMC Sierra, called the AT4X and Denali Ultimate. The refresh also includes a new front-end design, as well as a revised interior. All trucks equipped with front bucket seats receive a new center console-mounted transmission shift lever (trucks equipped with a front bench seat retain the previous column-mounted gear selector lever). The 3.0-liter Duramax turbocharged diesel engine now has expanded availability on more trim levels. The 5.3 L V8 is not available on Sierra 1500 AT4 models once again.

The short 6.5-foot (2.0 m) pickup box option has returned for the Chevrolet Silverado 1500 and GMC Sierra 1500 Regular Cabs since last being offered in the US market on the previous generation from 2018. The current generation version, which was previously only available in Mexico and the Middle East, is only available in the U.S. market with the WT and Pro trims of the Silverado and Sierra, respectively. Other trim levels like RST and Trail Boss for the Silverado and Elevation and AT4 for the Sierra have been available with this configuration in the Middle East since 2019 but are not offered in the U.S. Silverado 1500 WT and Sierra 1500 Pro Regular Cab models now received standard power windows, door locks, and push-button start, although keyless entry remained an extra-cost option. All models from the LT (Silverado) and SLE (Sierra) and above received a newly standard 13.4-inch touchscreen infotainment system, which included wireless Apple CarPlay and Android Auto smartphone integration and SiriusXM satellite radio with 360L (up-level models also receive connected GPS navigation), while base models retained the previously-standard seven-inch touchscreen display. A new Silverado 1500 ZR2 model became the most off-road capable model in the lineup, while a new Sierra 1500 Denali Ultimate was now the top-tier trim of the lineup, which also received a new premium Bose surround sound audio system with an amplifier, subwoofer, and genuine metal speaker grilles. Top-tier Silverado and Sierra models received GM's Super Cruise semi-autonomous driving system, allowing for hands-free driving on most highways, and all models received more standard safety equipment.

Chevrolet also introduced the ZR2, a new trim level to this series which slotted between High Country and LTZ. GMC models receive a similar, though more upscale model known as AT4X.

The refreshed 2022 Chevrolet Silverado 1500 and GMC Sierra 1500 began shipping to dealerships in the spring of 2022. Both brands also sold the outgoing models of both trucks, named the Silverado 1500 LTD and Sierra 1500 Limited, respectively, alongside the new models. Only 1500 (half-ton) models of both trucks were refreshed for 2022, with a refresh of the heavy-duty (2500HD and 3500HD) trucks following in 2024.

In April 2023, GM introduced the 2500HD version of the ZR2, a new heavy-duty off-road model, as well as a special edition called the ZR2 Bison, in partnership with parts supplier American Expedition Vehicles. CNBC noted it was another sign of a trend where automakers grew their off-road models to increase profits. For the 2024 model year, Sierra Pro and Silverado W/T models now include OnStar with 4G LTE Wi-Fi capabilities as standard equipment, though SiriusXM Satellite Radio remains an optional feature.

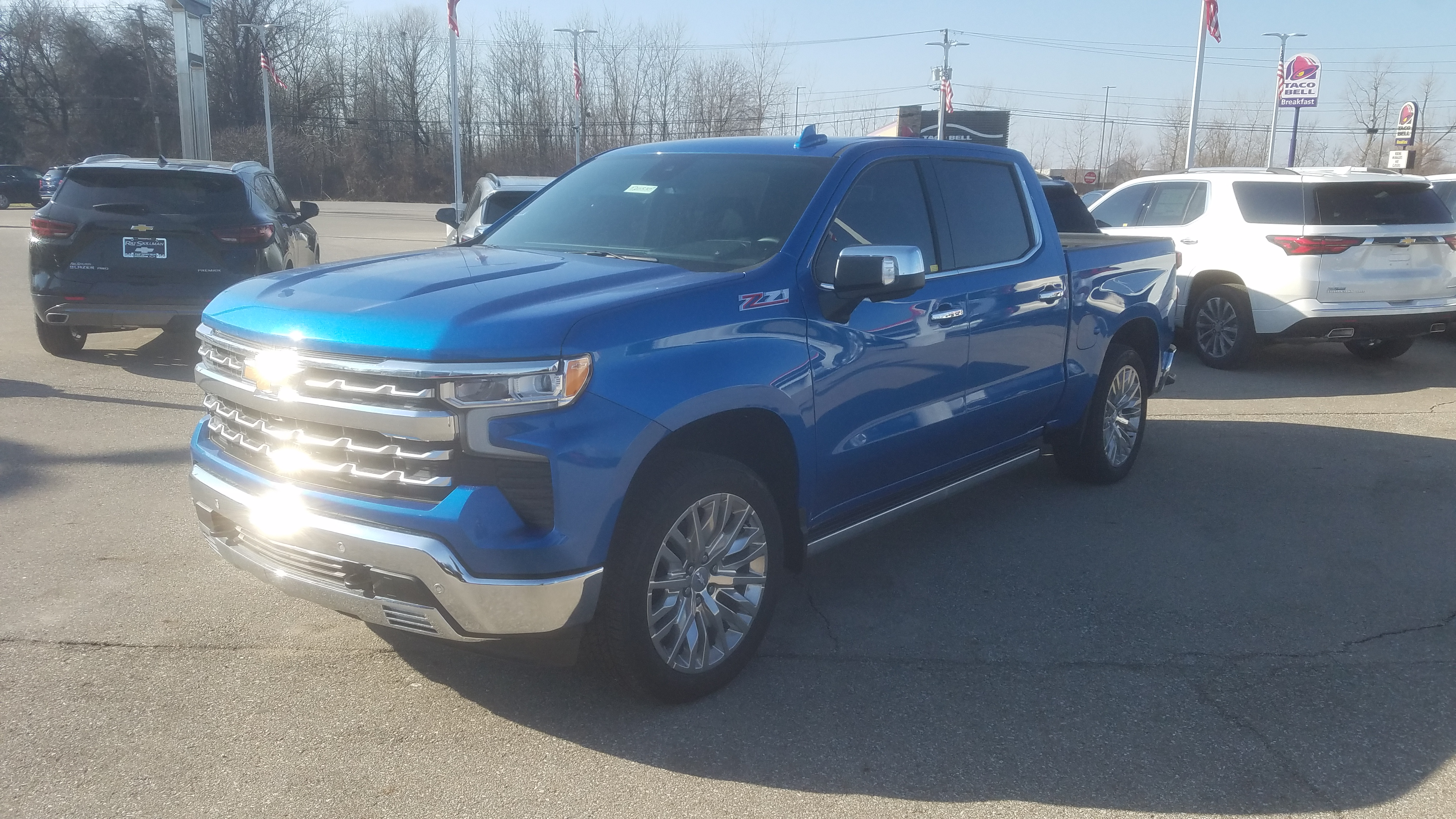
2022 Silverado 1500 LTZ front

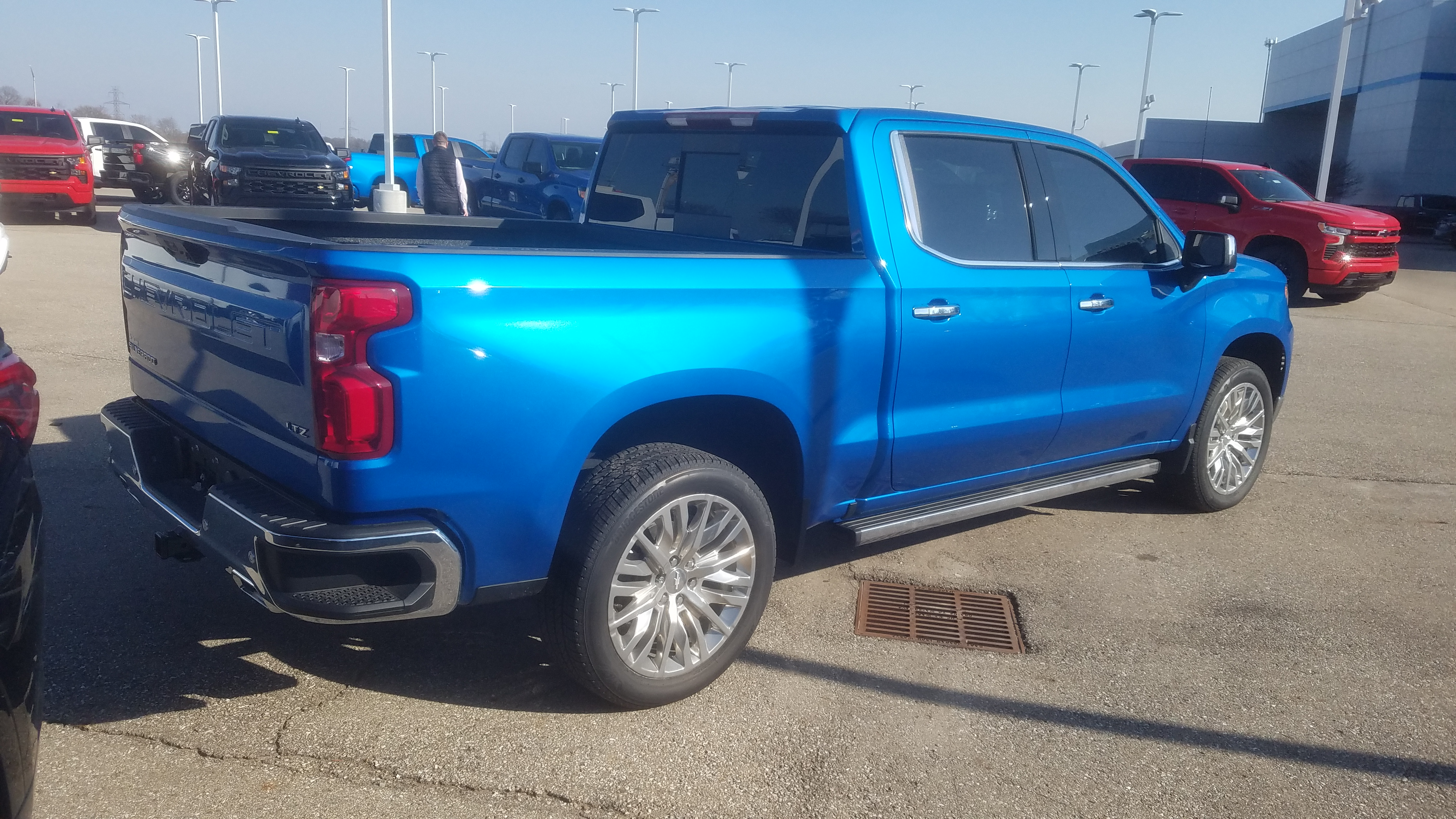
2022 Silverado 1500 LTZ rear

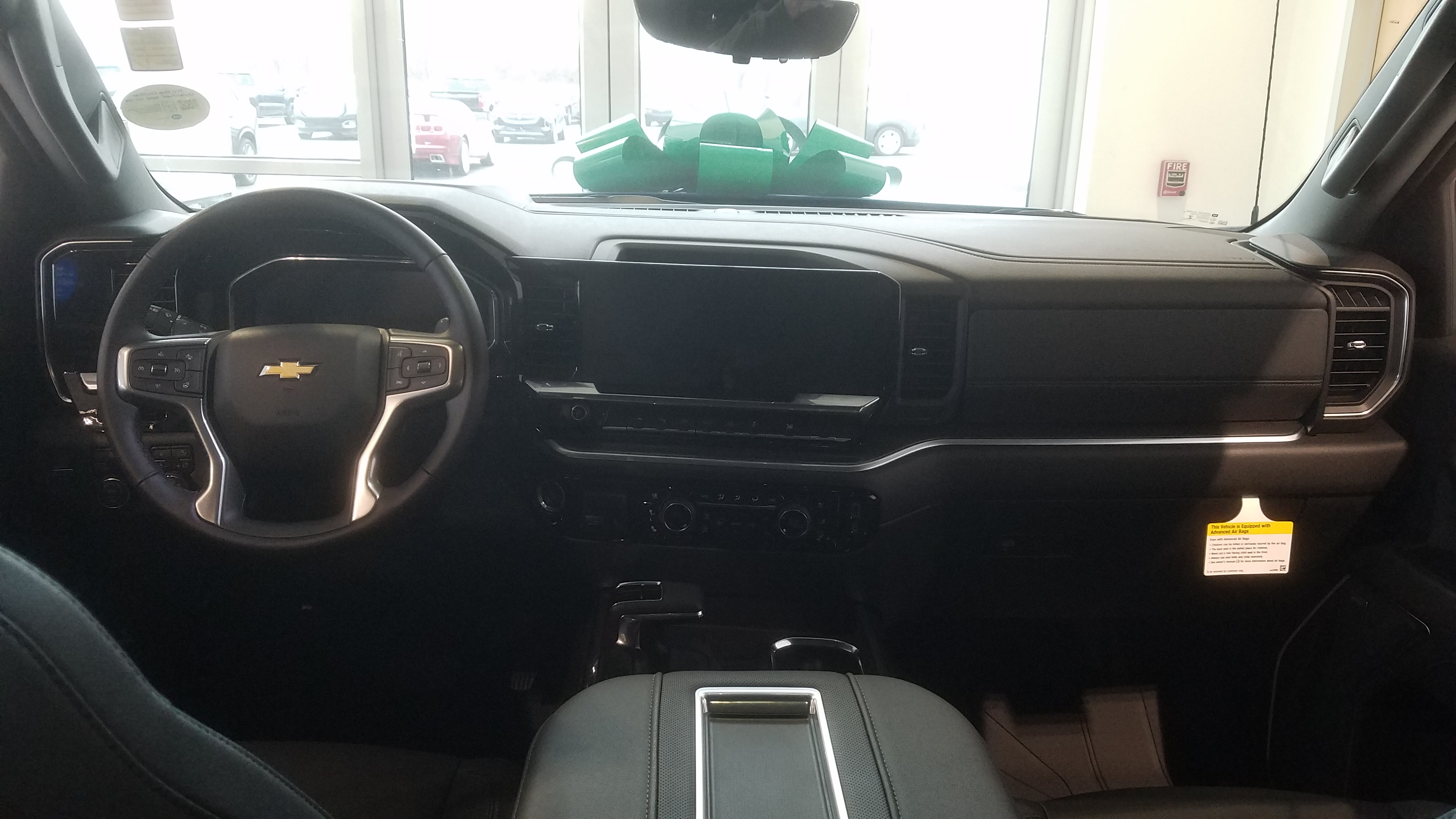
2022 Silverado 1500 interior

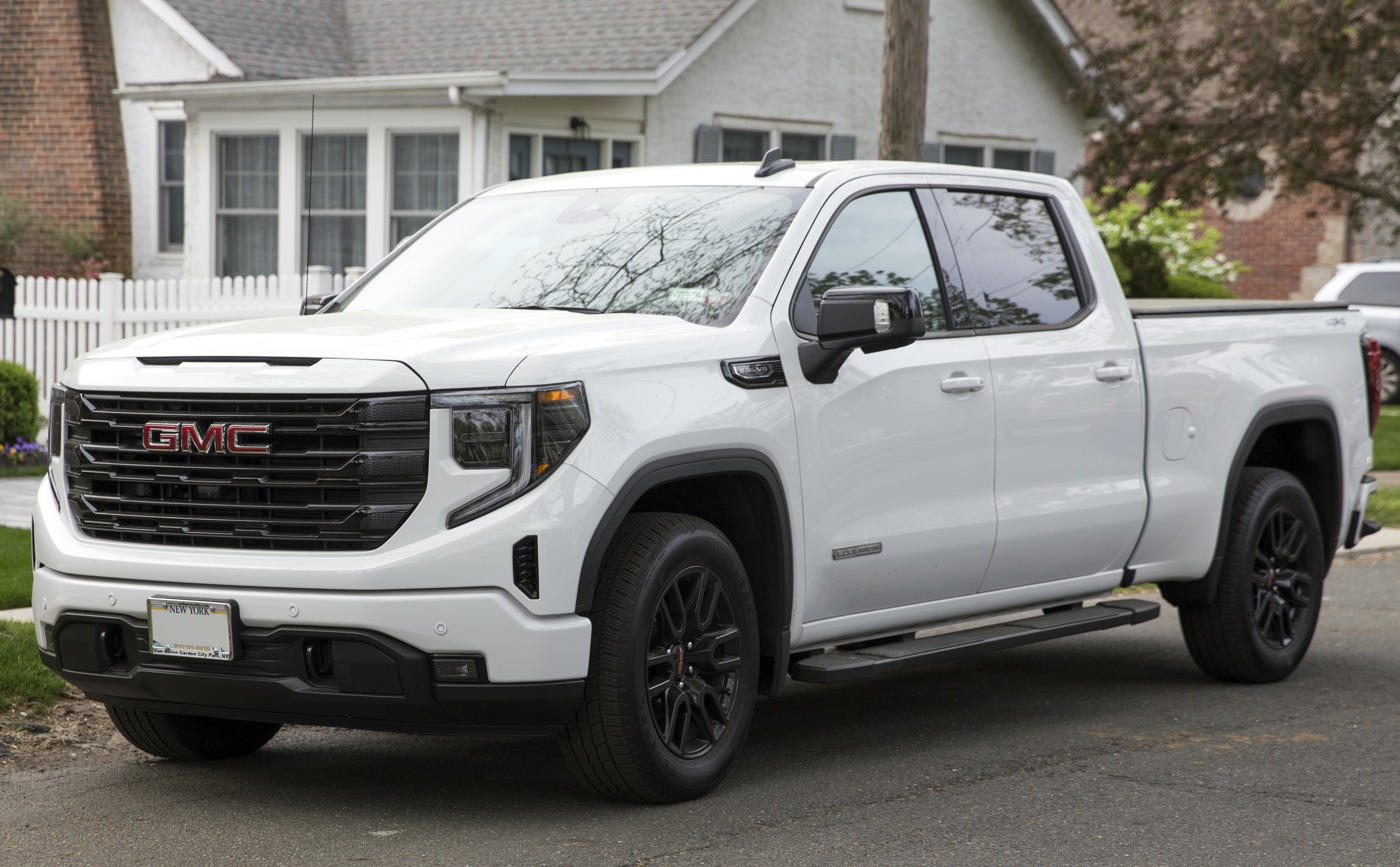
2024 Sierra 1500 Elevation front

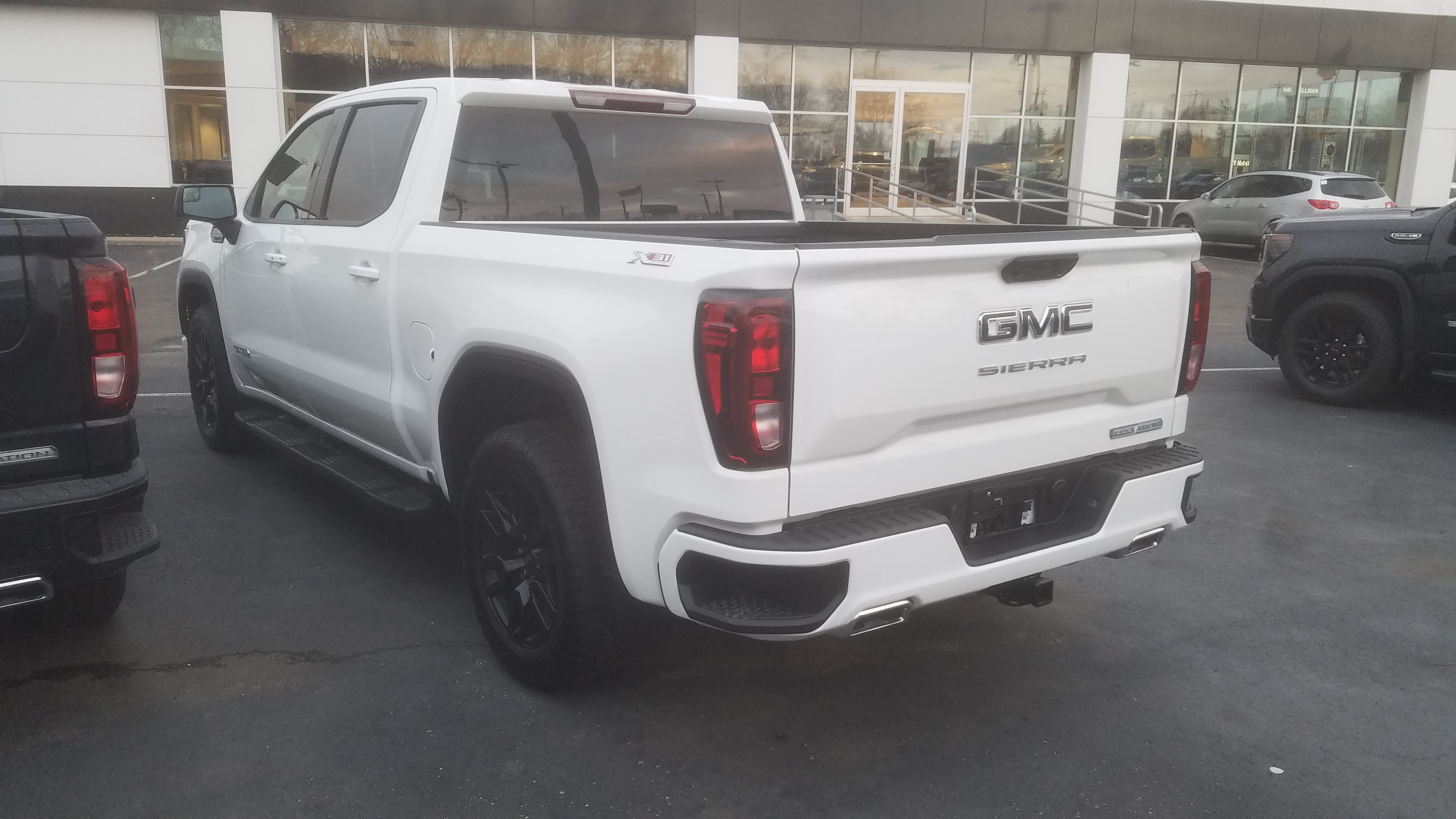
2022 Sierra 1500 Elevation rear

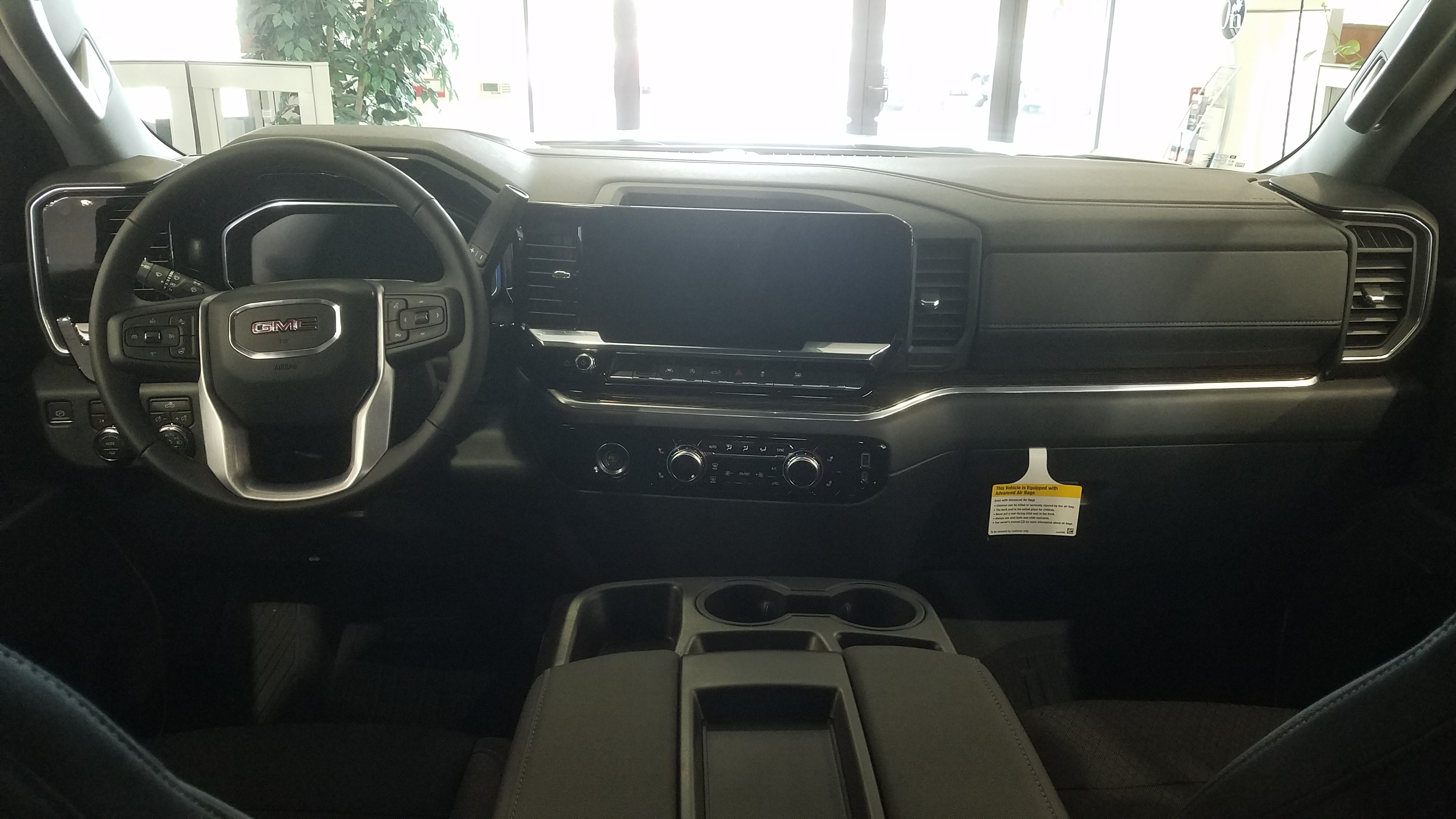
2022 Sierra 1500 interior (standard)

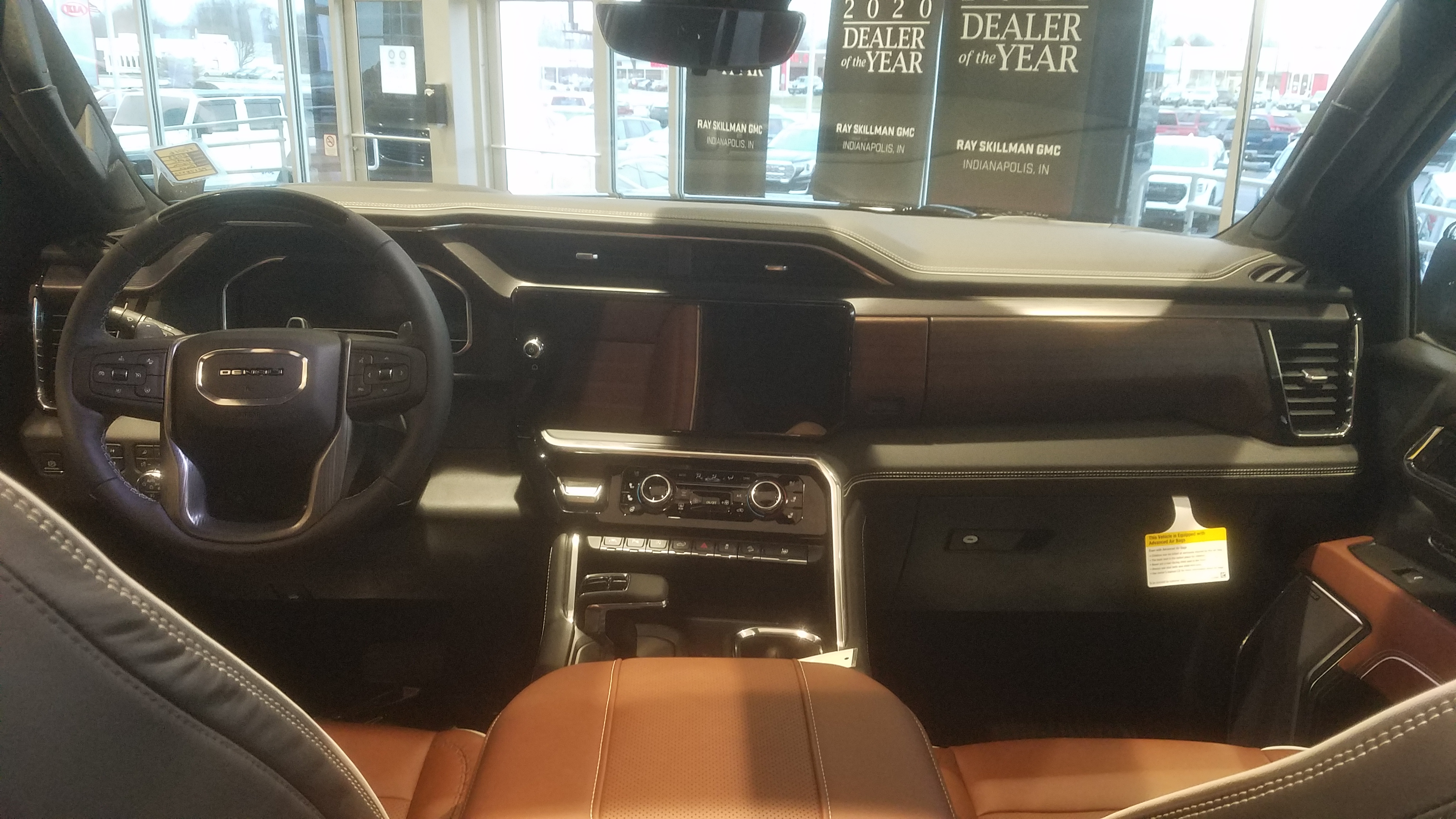
2022 Sierra 1500 interior (Denali Ultimate)

=== Safety ===
Sitting higher than other consumer vehicles, the Chevrolet Silverado has significantly larger blind spots in which people or other cars are invisible to the driver. According to data from the National Highway Traffic Safety Administration, the Silverado is the second most likely car to be involved in a fatal crash.

The 2022 Silverado 1500 LTD Crew Cab was tested by the Insurance Institute for Highway Safety (IIHS):

IIHS Chevrolet Silverado 1500 LTD Crew Cab:
Category	Rating	
Small overlap frontal offset (Driver)	Good	
Small overlap frontal offset (Passenger)	Marginal	
Moderate overlap frontal offset	Good	
Side impact (original test)	Good	
Roof strength	Good	
Head restraints and seats	Good	
Headlights	Poor	
Front crash prevention (Vehicle-to-Vehicle)	Superior	optional
Seat belt reminders	Poor	
Child seat anchors (LATCH) ease of use	Marginal	

ANCAP test results Chevrolet Silverado 1500 LTZ Premium & ZR2 variants (2025)
Overall
Grading:	27% (Bronze)	
Test	Points	%
Pedestrian:	6.60	27%
Safety assist:	6.21	49%

== Fifth-generation Silverado / sixth-generation Sierra (2026) ==
Fifth generation

Overview
- Production: October 2026-present
- Model years: 2027
- Assembly: United States: Roanoke, Indiana (Fort Wayne Assembly), Orion Township, Michigan (Orion Assembly) (GMC Sierra 1500); Mexico: Silao, Guanajuato

Powertrain
- Engine: 2.7 L L4B turbocharged TurboMax I4; 5.7 L L76 V8; 6.6 L L78 V8; 3.0 L LZ0 turbodiesel I6; 8.3 L L6P turbodiesel V8
- Power output: 350 hp (261 kW; 355 PS) (2.7 L L4B); 402 hp (300 kW; 408 PS) (5.7 L L76); 481 hp (359 kW; 488 PS) (6.6 L L78); 305 hp (227 kW; 309 PS) (3.0 L LZ0)
- Transmission: 10-speed automatic

On June 16, 2026, Chevrolet unveiled the next-generation Silverado 1500; the GMC Sierra 1500 counterpart was unveiled later on June 25, 2026. The redesigned Silverado features a slightly more rugged exterior, a redesigned fascia with restyled grilles and more integrated lights that incorporate C-shaped daytime running lights, bar lights, and isolated direction headlights, wheel arch moldings, redesigned alloy wheels, and a more furnished interior with larger screens. On the Sierra, it also features a slightly more upfront and simpler exterior, with upside-down L-shaped headlights and a formal grille to emphasize a more traditional style compared with the Silverado.

2027 Silverado 1500 production commenced at Silao Assembly in Mexico on October 12, 2026. Production at Fort Wayne Assembly in Indiana is expected to begin in January 2027. Initial customer deliveries are expected to begin in November or early December 2026, with high-trim V8-powered Crew Cab models taking priority.

=== Trims and displays ===
Most of the trims of the Silverado and Sierra are carried over from the previous generation. However, the RST and LTZ trims on Silverado have been replaced with the Z71 trim level, the LT Trail Boss trim on Silverado has been replaced with the Trail Boss trim level, and the SLE and SLT trims on Sierra have been discontinued with no replacement. All trims now use the General Motors software platform first used in the Chevrolet Blazer EV, and feature a 12.2-inch LCD-based instrument cluster, 16.3-inch infotainment display, and on higher trims, a new 11.5-inch passenger display.

=== Engines ===
The next-generation Silverado and Sierra 1500 are available with four engine options, including new 5.7-liter and 6.6-liter small-block V8s. The 2.7-liter TurboMax turbocharged four-cylinder gasoline and 3.0-liter Duramax diesel engines are carried over from the previous generation. All engines are now mated to a 10-speed automatic transmission.

== Silverado EV ==
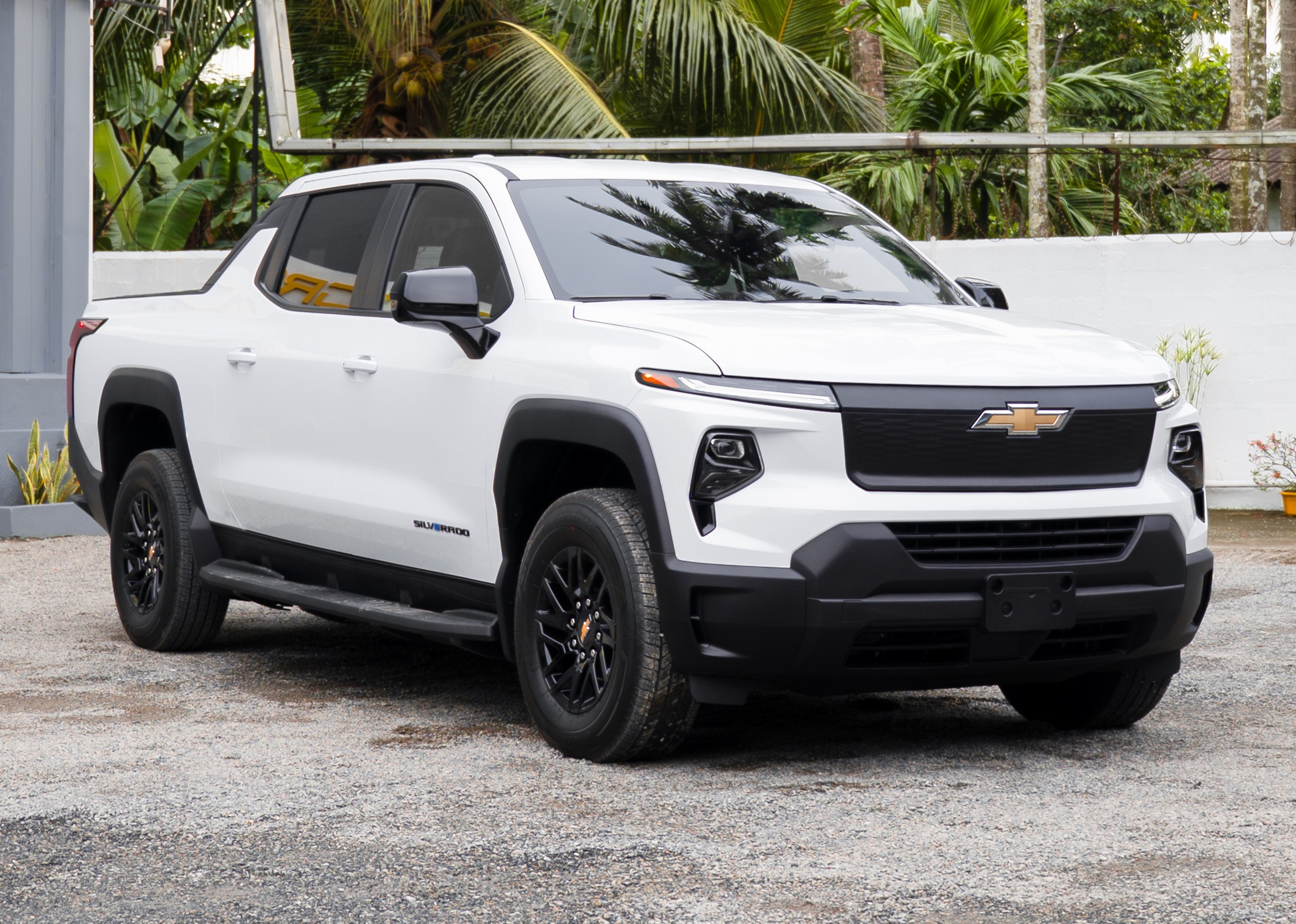
2024 Silverado EV work truck

In April 2021, GM President Mark Reuss announced that Chevrolet would build an electric variant of the Chevrolet Silverado 1500 pickup truck at the Factory ZERO complex in Detroit. The vehicle was expected to have a targeted range of 400 miles. The vehicle was unveiled in January 2022 at the 2022 Consumer Electronics Show (CES). It was built from the ground up as a fully electric pickup by using a battery electric platform shared with the GMC Hummer EV, rather than using the existing Silverado platform. Production started at the Factory ZERO assembly plant in the second quarter of 2023.

The Silverado EV is offered initially in the WT (Work Truck) trim for fleet and commercial buyers, and the RST First Edition, aimed at retail customers seeking a higher level of technology and comfort. Additional variants, such as the Trail Boss, provide enhanced off-road capability.

Powertrain options include dual-motor all-wheel-drive systems, producing up to 510 hp (380 kW) and 615 lb-ft (834 Nm) of torque in the WT trim, and up to 664 hp (495 kW) and 780 lb-ft (1,058 Nm) in the RST First Edition "Wide Open Watts" mode. The Trail Boss variant is rated at 725 hp (541 kW) and 775 lb-ft (1,050 Nm). The Silverado EV uses GM's Ultium battery technology, providing an estimated driving range of up to 478 miles (769 km) depending on the configuration. The vehicle supports DC fast charging at up to 350 kW, capable of adding roughly 100 miles (160 km) of range in 10 minutes.

The pickup has a maximum towing capacity of 12,500 lb (5,670 kg) and a payload capacity of up to 2,100 lb (953 kg) depending on the trim. Additional features include four-wheel steering, the Multi-Flex Midgate to extend bed length, and off-road driving modes available on higher trims. The Silverado EV also supports offboard power output of up to 10.2 kW, allowing it to power tools or other equipment for worksite applications.

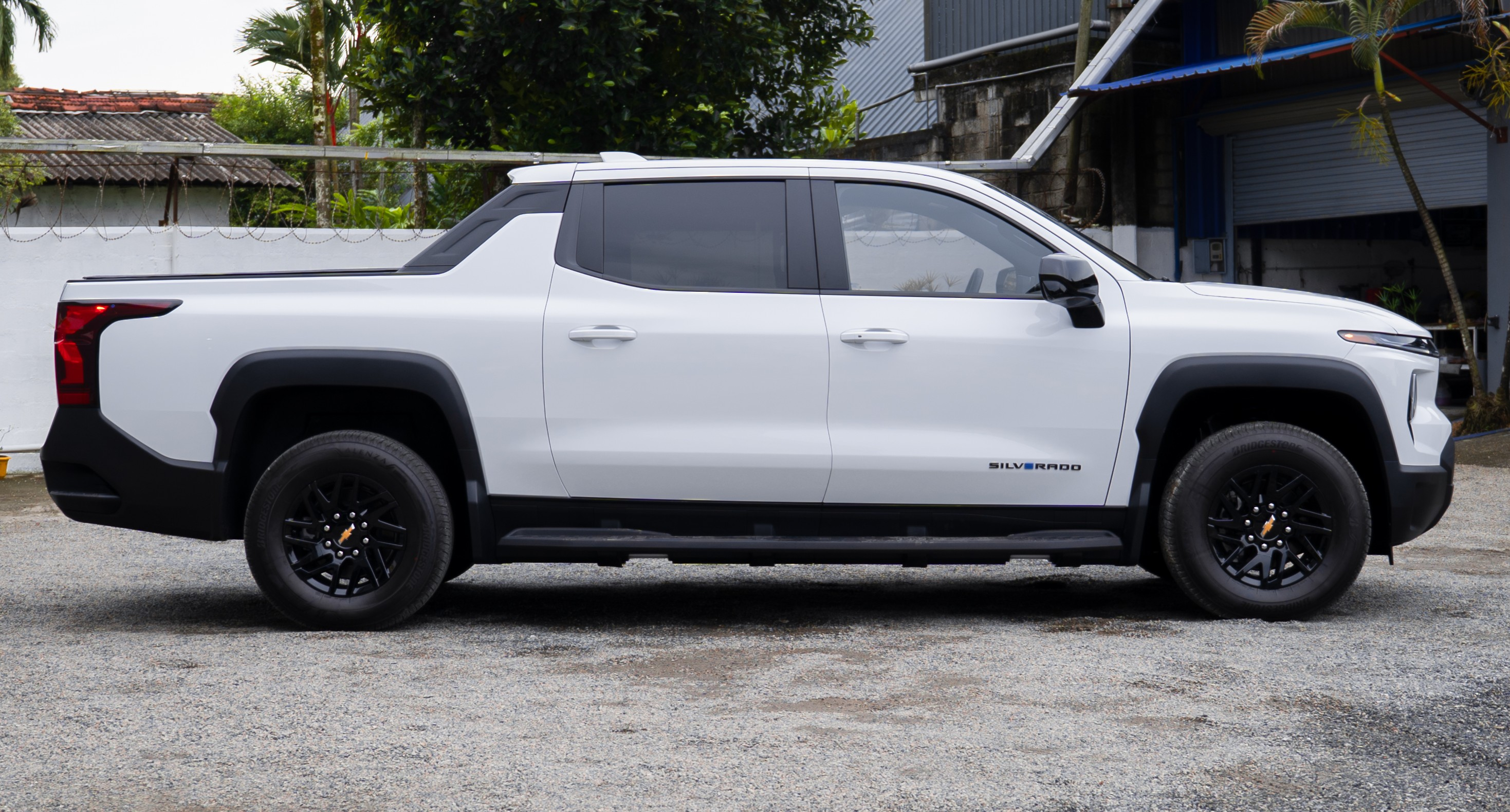
2024 Silverado EV work truck, side view

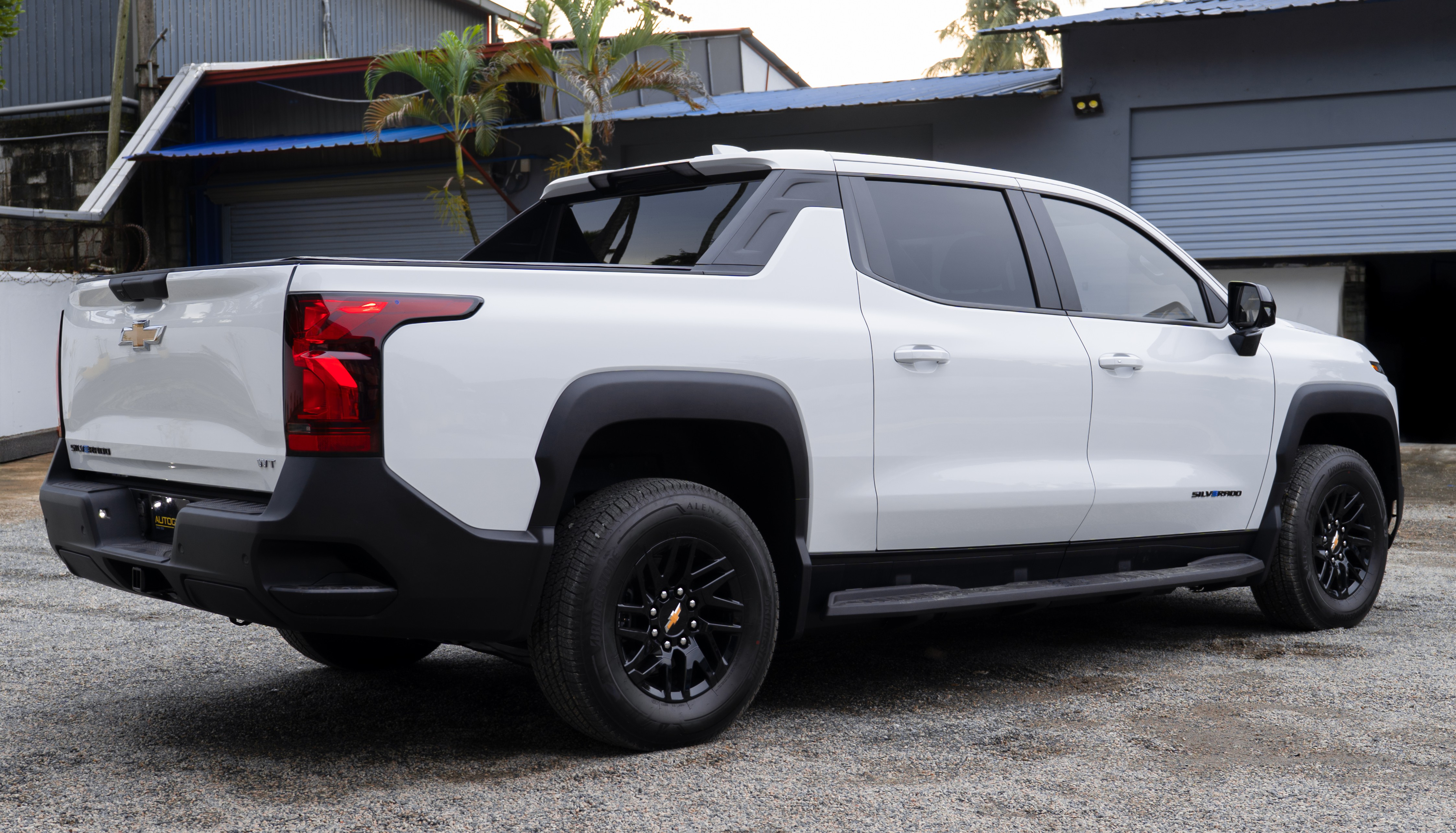
2024 Silverado EV work truck, rear view

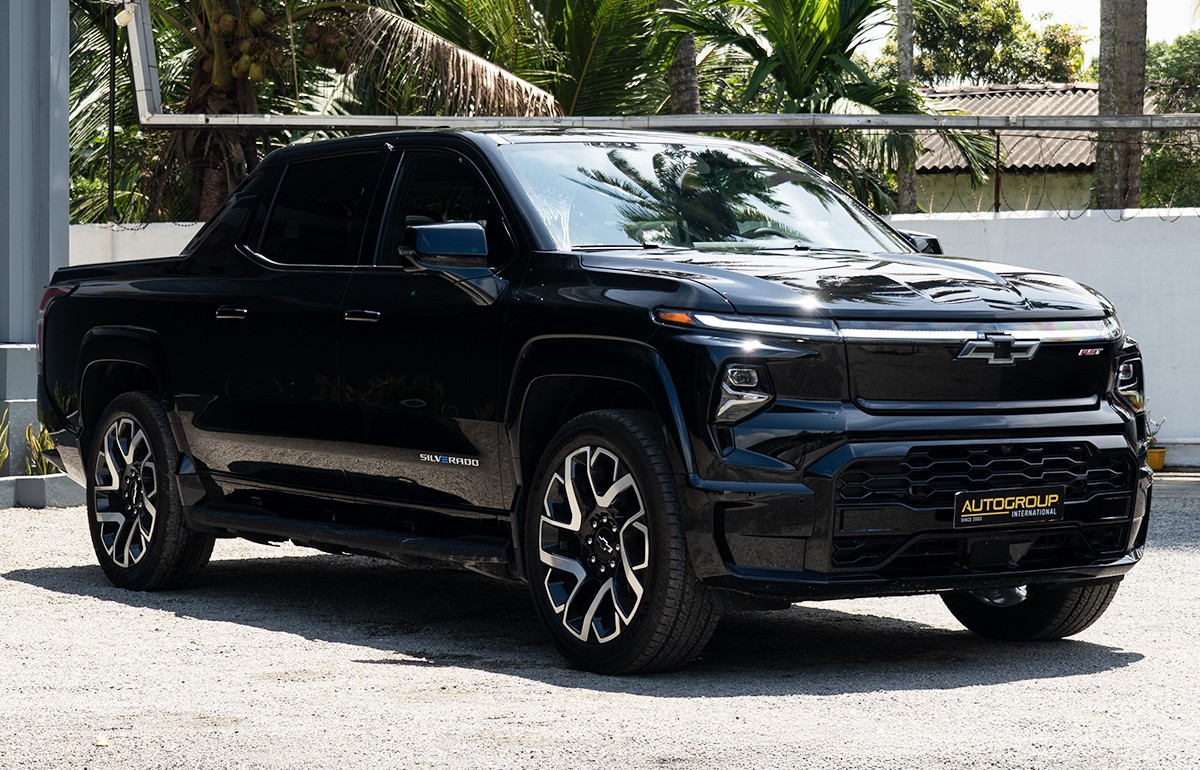
2024 Silverado EV RST

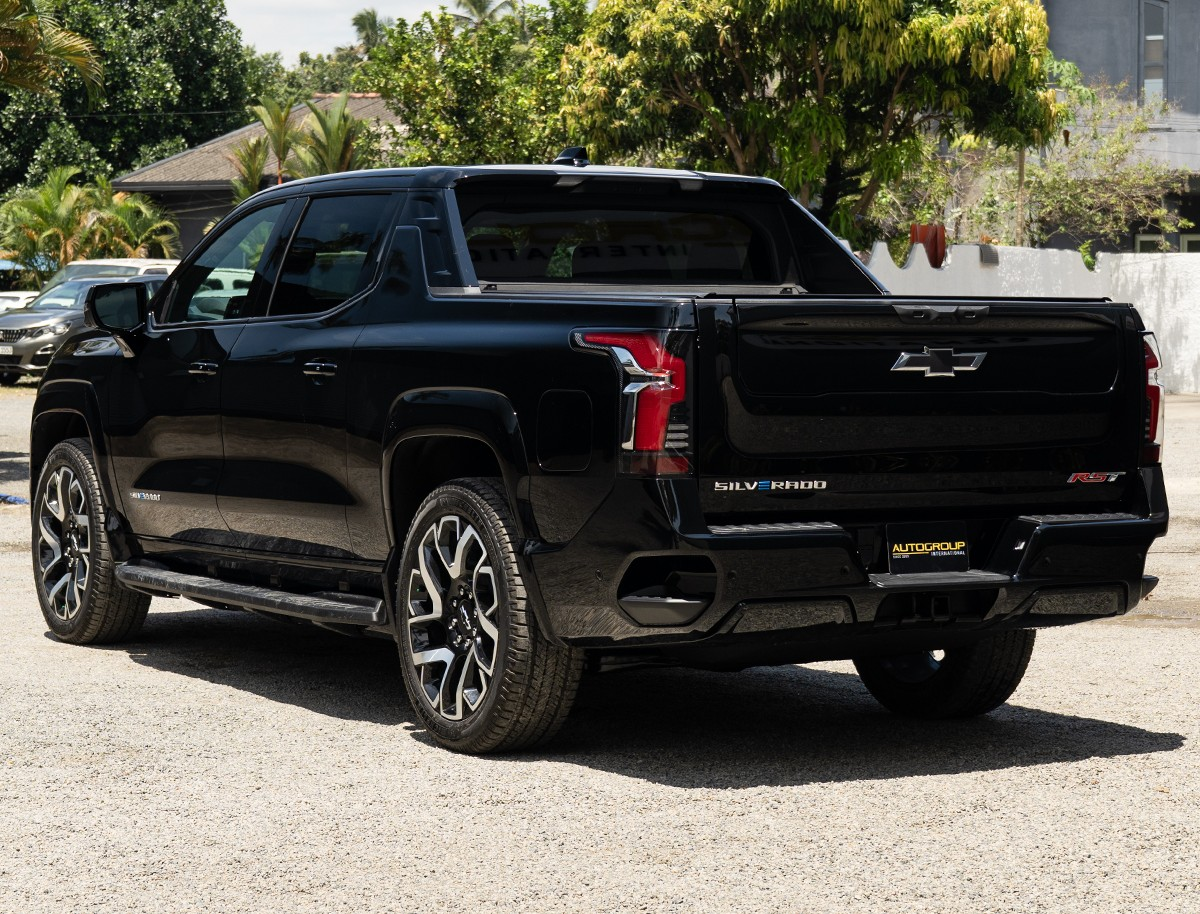
2024 Silverado EV RST, rear view

== Medium duty version (4500HD, 5500HD, 6500HD, and International CV) ==
Chevrolet Silverado Medium duty
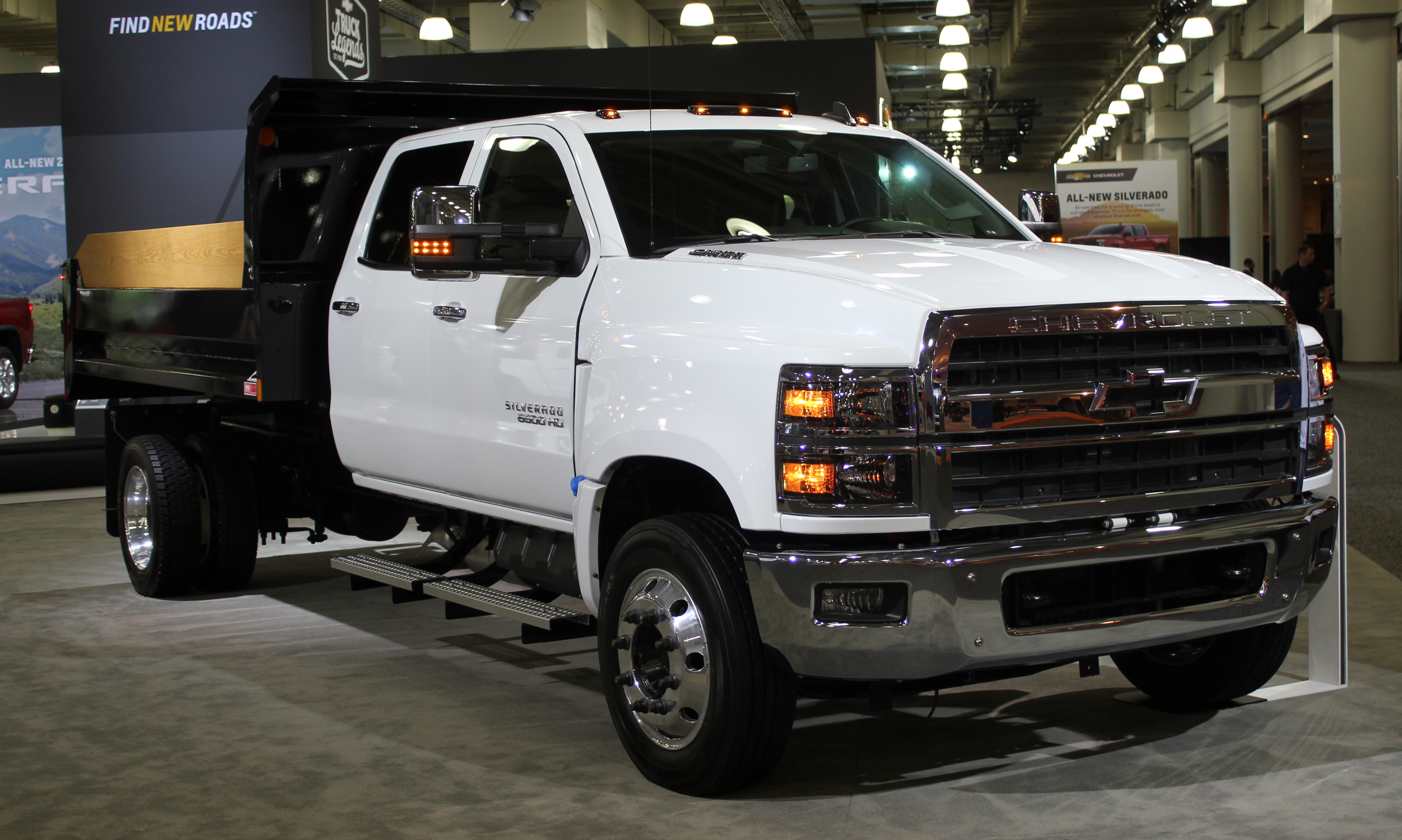

Overview
- Manufacturer: General Motors
- Also called: International CV
- Production: 2018–2026
- Model years: 2019–2026
- Assembly: Springfield, Ohio (Navistar)

Powertrain
- Engine: L5D Duramax Diesel 6.6 L V8
- Transmission: 6-speed Allison A1700/A2700 automatic

Dimensions
- Wheelbase: Regular Cab: 141–243 in (3,581–6,172 mm); Double/Crew Cab: 175–235 in (4,445–5,969 mm)
- Length: Regular Cab: 224.5–360.0 in (5,702–9,144 mm); Crew Cab: 258.7–344.2 in (6,571–8,743 mm)
- Width: 84.0 in (2,134 mm)
- Height: 82.5–86.4 in (2,100–2,190 mm)
- Curb weight: 4500HD: 7,507–8,815 lb (3,405–3,998 kg); 5500HD: 7,507–8,814 lb (3,405–3,998 kg); 6500HD: 7,560–9,307 lb (3,429–4,222 kg)

For the 2019 model year, General Motors released the medium-duty Silverado 4500HD/5500HD/6500HD, joining the Chevrolet LCF 3500/4500/5500 model line (derived from the Isuzu NPR) and succeeding the prior Chevrolet Kodiak and GMC TopKick. Competing against the Ford F-450/550/650 and Ram 4500/5500, the model line spans Class 4–6 trucks, with GVWR ranging from 14,001 to 23,500 lb (6,351 to 10,659 kg). Unlike the previous Kodiak/TopKick line, which was discontinued in 2009, GM markets the medium-duty Silverado line exclusively as a Chevrolet with no GMC equivalent; along with a lack of divisional support for the segment, GM is seeking to rebrand the current GMC line to focus on premium vehicles. This model is also only offered in diesel, with no gasoline engine option.

=== History ===
The medium-duty Silverado was co-developed with Navistar, which sells a rebadged variant as the International CV (Commercial Vocational); the CV replaces the International D series and International TerraStar. GM developed the powertrain, while Navistar was responsible for the chassis. With the exception of grilles and badging, both model lines are identical. Navistar assembles both lines at its Springfield, Ohio facility, using cabs assembled by Navistar in Springfield.

GM unveiled the medium-duty Silverado line at the NTEA Work Truck Show in March 2018. Navistar unveiled the CV Series that November, and production began in December.

=== Design ===
In contrast to smaller Silverado pickup trucks, the 4500HD/5500HD/6500HD and CV are only offered as a chassis cab vehicle intended for modification by upfitters/body builders, typically by adding specialized rear bodywork. The frame rails have been designed to ease installation for upfitters. It is marketed with two-door or four-door cabs and either rear-wheel or four-wheel drive, using a gear-driven transfer case. The hood tilts forward for easier access to the engine and for routine service. GM has designated the model as the GM515 or GM51P, depending on the end use, with the GM51P used for incomplete passenger bus chassis.

Both the Silverado medium-duty and CV are powered by a 350 horsepower (260 kW), 700 lb⋅ft (950 N⋅m) variant of the Duramax 6.6L V8 diesel engine paired with an Allison 1000 or 2000 series automatic transmission. There is also a diesel exhaust fluid filling port by the passenger's side door.

Available wheelbase and cab-to-axle dimensions
Cab-to-axle	Body	Wheelbase	Overhang				
Cab-to-axle	Body	Wheelbase	Front	Rear 49 in (1,245 mm)	Rear 63 in (1,600 mm)	Rear 75 in (1,905 mm)	Rear 91 in (2,311 mm)
60 in (1,524 mm)	Regular Cab	141 in (3,581 mm) (standard 2WD)	34 in (864 mm)	Yes	Yes	No	Yes
60 in (1,524 mm)	Crew Cab	175 in (4,445 mm) (standard)	34 in (864 mm)	Yes	No	No	No
84 in (2,134 mm)	Regular Cab	165 in (4,191 mm) (standard 4WD)	34 in (864 mm)	Yes	Yes	No	Yes
84 in (2,134 mm)	Crew Cab	199 in (5,055 mm)	34 in (864 mm)	Yes	Yes	No	No
104 in (2,642 mm)	Crew Cab	219 in (5,563 mm)	34 in (864 mm)	No	No	Yes	No
108 in (2,743 mm)	Regular Cab	189 in (4,801 mm)	34 in (864 mm)	Yes	Yes	Yes	No
120 in (3,048 mm)	Regular Cab	201 in (5,105 mm)	34 in (864 mm)	Yes	Yes	Yes	No
120 in (3,048 mm)	Crew Cab	235 in (5,969 mm)	34 in (864 mm)	No	No	Yes	No
138 in (3,505 mm)	Regular Cab	219 in (5,563 mm)	34 in (864 mm)	No	Yes	No	No
150 in (3,810 mm)	Regular Cab	231 in (5,867 mm)	34 in (864 mm)	No	No	No	Yes
162 in (4,115 mm)	Regular Cab	243 in (6,172 mm)	34 in (864 mm)	No	No	Yes	No

The front wheels can turn by up to 50 degrees to enhance maneuverability.

=== Sales ===
At its launch, GM introduced the model line primarily through its dealer network that specialized in fleet and commercial truck sales, known as the 'Business Elite' program, alongside an additional limited number of selected dealerships.

=== Discontinuation ===
In May 2026, GM and International announced the discontinuation of the Silverado Medium Duty and International CV lines of trucks, along with the sale of the Springfield, Ohio, assembly plant. Production of International CV trucks will end on September 10, 2026, while Silverado Medium Duty production is scheduled to sunset on September 30, 2026.

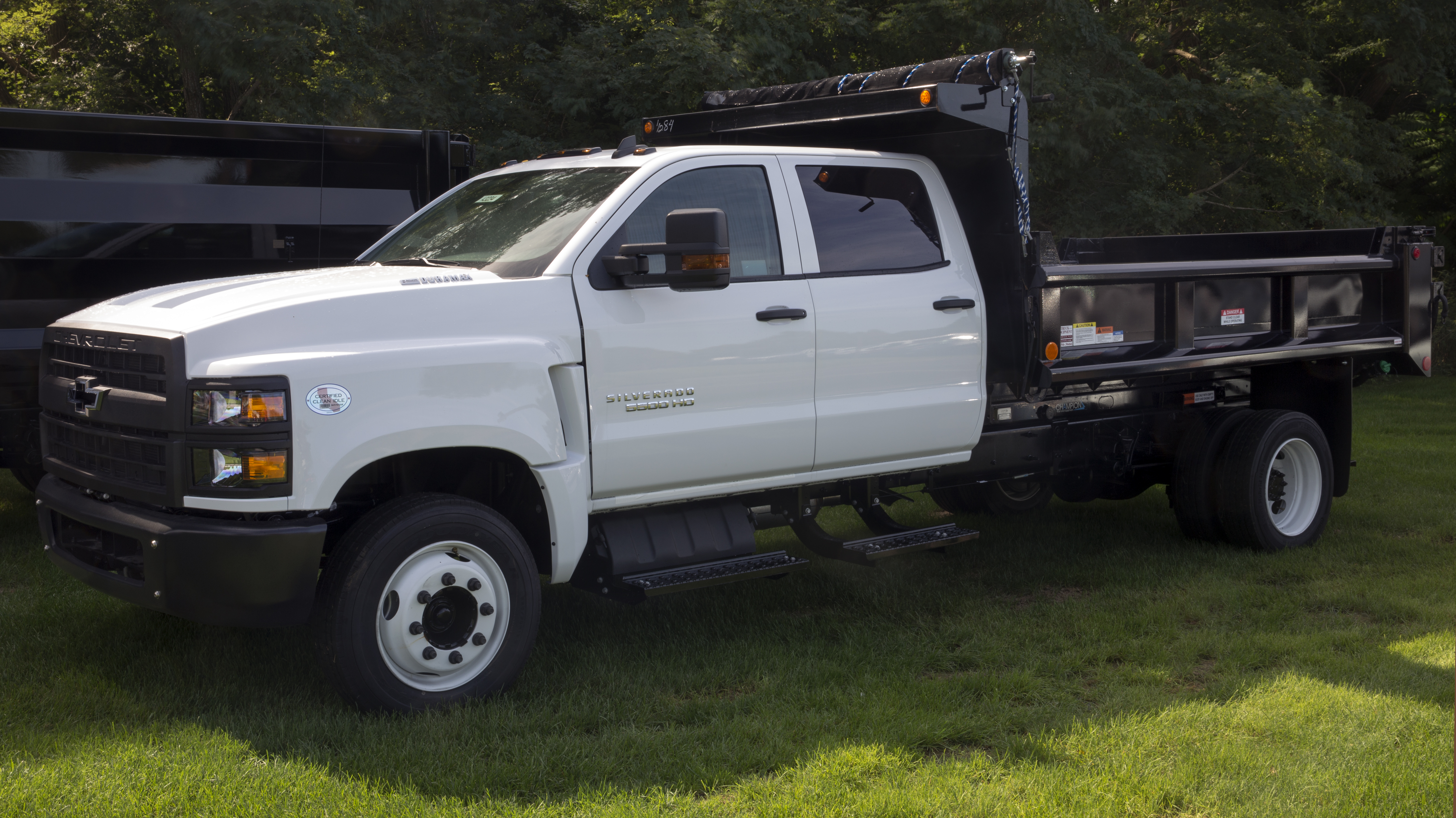
Silverado 6500HD with dump bed

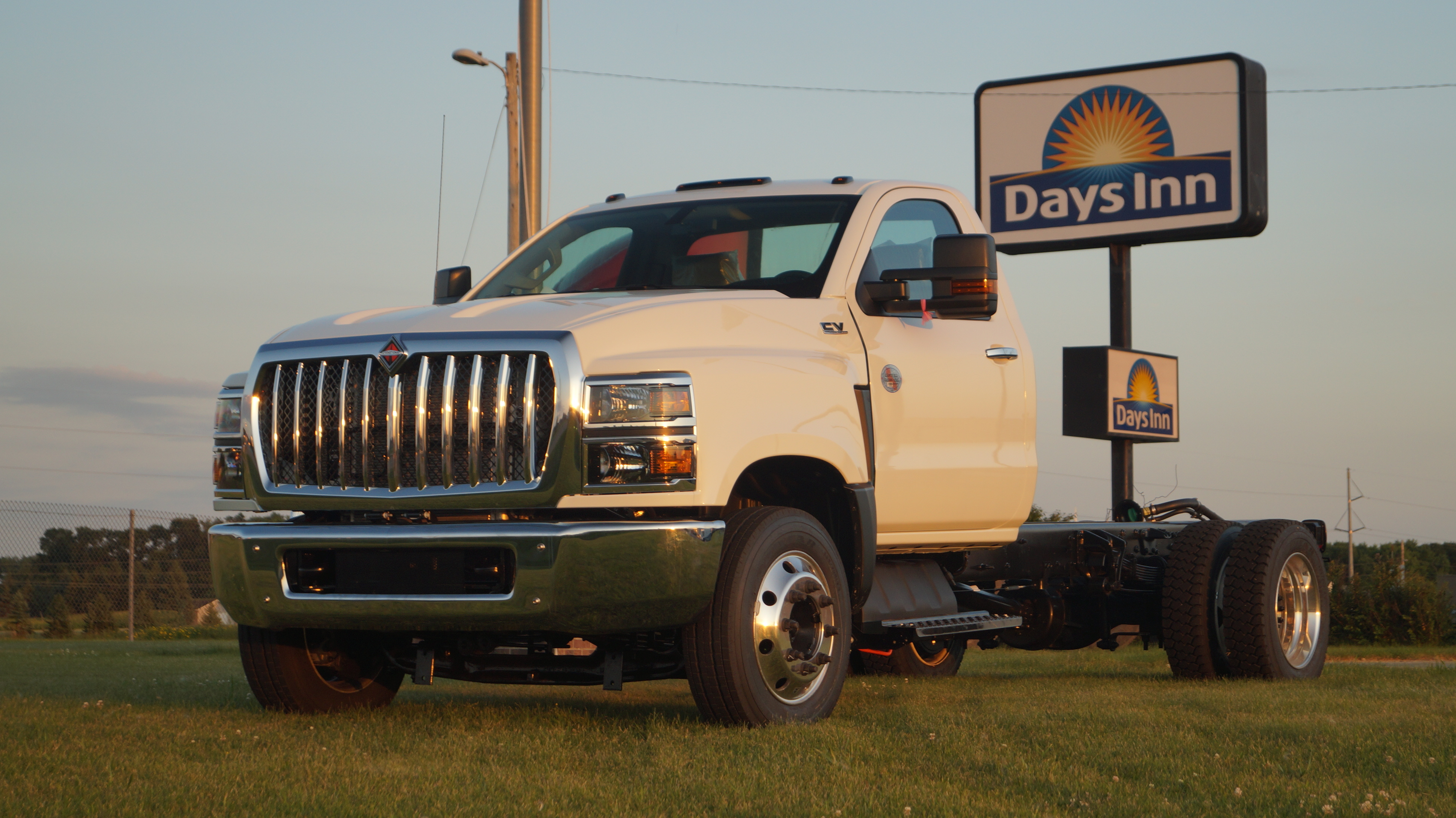
International CV

== Military applications ==
LSSV
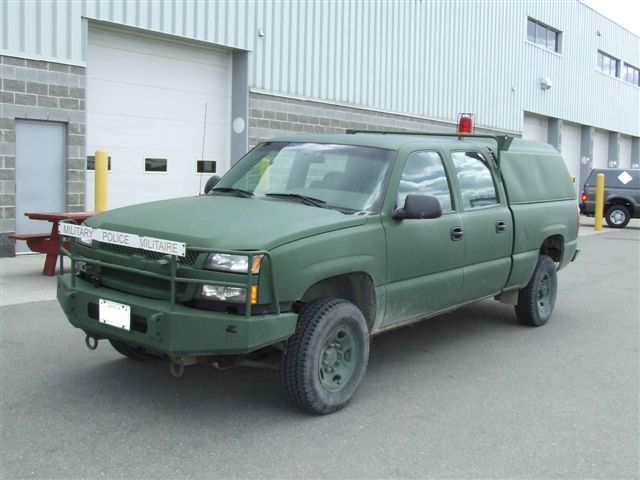

Overview
- Manufacturer: General Motors; AM General
- Model years: 2001–present

Body and chassis
- Body style: 2-door SUV; 4-door SUV; 2-door pickup; 4-door pickup
- Platform: GM GMT880 platform

Powertrain
- Engine: 6.6 L Duramax V8
- Transmission: 4-speed 4L80-E automatic; 5-speed Allison 1000 automatic

Dimensions
- Width: 79.9 in (2.03 m)
- Height: 74.5 in (1.89 m)

=== LSSV ===
When production of the CUCV II ended in 2000, GM redesigned it to coincide with civilian truck offerings. The CUCV nomenclature was changed to Light Service Support Vehicle (LSSV) in 2001. In 2005, LSSV production switched to AM General, a unit of MacAndrews and Forbes Holdings. The LSSV is a GM-built Chevrolet Silverado 2500HD, Chevrolet Tahoe, or Chevrolet Suburban that is powered by a Duramax 6.6 liter turbo diesel engine. The various Silverados, Tahoes, and Suburbans that are used provide numerous platforms for different kinds of vehicles. As GM has redesigned its civilian trucks and SUVs from 2001–present, LSSVs have also been updated cosmetically.

The Militarization of standard GM trucks/SUVs to become LSSVs includes exterior changes such as CARC paint (Forest Green, Desert Sand, or 3-color Camouflage), blackout lights, military bumpers, a brush guard, a NATO slave receptacle/NATO trailer receptacle, a pintle hook and tow shackles. The electrical system is changed to the 24/12-volt military standard. The dashboard has additional controls and data plates. The truck also can be equipped with weapon supports in the cab, cargo tie down hooks, folding troop seats, pioneer tools, winches, and other military accessories.

The Enhanced Mobility Package (EMP) option adds enhanced suspension, 4-wheel anti-lock brakes, a locking differential, on/off-road bead-lock tires, a tire pressure monitoring system and other upgrades. About 2,000 LSSV units were sold to U.S. and international military and law enforcement organizations.

=== Variants ===
- Cargo/Troop Carrier Pickup (2-door, Extended Cab, or 4-door Silverado)
- Cargo/Command Vehicle (4-door Tahoe)
- Cargo/Troop/Command Vehicle/Ambulance (4-door Suburban)

=== ZH2 ===
ZH2 Chevrolet Silverado

Overview
- Manufacturer: General Motors
- Model years: 2018–present

Body and chassis
- Body style: 2-door pickup

Powertrain
- Engine: GM Hydrotec Fuel Cell Electric

General Motors relaunched the GM Defense division in 2018 offering the ZH2 Silverado, an advanced technology Chevrolet Silverado with a hydrogen-powered fuel cell and a heavy-duty truck architecture modified for next generation military vehicle needs. There is also a ZH2 Chevrolet Colorado military version.

== Awards ==
=== Chevrolet Silverado ===
- 1999 – Motor Trend magazine's Truck of the Year
- 2001 – Motor Trend magazine's Truck of the Year (HD Model)
- 2001 – Car and Driver magazine's Best Pickup Truck
- 2002 – Car and Driver magazine's Best Pickup Truck
- 2003 – Car and Driver magazine's Best Pickup Truck
- 2005 – J.D. Power 2005 most dependable heavy-duty full-size pickup (2002 Silverado 2500HD)
- 2007 – North American Truck of the Year
- 2007 – Motor Trend magazine's Truck of the Year
- 2007 – ICOTY International Truck of the Year
- 2007 – Truckin' magazine's Truck of the Year
- 2011 – Motor Trend magazine's Truck of the Year (2011 Silverado HD)
- 2015 – Most dependable heavy-duty full-size pickup by J.D. Power (2012 Silverado HD)
- 2017 – Kelley Blue Book's KBB 5-YEAR COST TO OWN (FULL-SIZE PICKUP) (2017 Silverado 1500 Regular Cab)
- 2017 – Kelley Blue Book's 2017 KBB BEST RESALE VALUE: FULL-SIZE PICKUP (2017 Silverado 1500)
- 2018 – J.D. Power Most dependable full-size light-duty pickup (2015 Silverado 1500)
- 2018 – Kelley Blue Book's KBB.COM BEST RESALE VALUE: FULL-SIZE PICKUP (2018 Silverado HD)
- 2018 – NHTSA'S (National Highway and Traffic Safety Administration's) 5-Star Overall Vehicle Score
- 2018 – Finalist for 2018 SEMA Truck of the Year.
- 2018 – Motor Trend's Truck of the Year Finalist (2019 model year)
- 2018 – iSeeCars Top 10 Vehicles With the Lowest Depreciation (2013 Silverado 1500)
- 2018 – North American Car, Utility and Truck of the Year finalist (including GMC Sierra)
- 2018 – PickupTrucks.com One-Ton Heavy-Duty Challenge (2018 Silverado 3500HD High Country Duramax)
- 2018 – Ward's Best Engine Award (6.2-liter EcoTec3 V8)
- 2020 – Cars.com Best Pickup Truck of 2020 (2020 Silverado HD)
- 2021 – J.D. Power Best Resale Value Large Light Duty Pickup (2021 Chevrolet Silverado 1500)
- 2021 – J.D. Power Best Resale Value Large Heavy Duty Pickup (2021 Chevrolet Silverado HD)
- 2022 – J.D. Power Best Resale Value Large Heavy Duty Pickup (2022 Chevrolet Silverado HD)
- 2023 – Four Wheeler 2023 Pickup Truck of the Year (2023 Chevrolet Silverado ZR2)

=== GMC Sierra ===
- 2013 – J.D. Power Most dependable large pickup (2010 Sierra 2500HD)
- 2014 – Consumer Guide Best Buy Award (Sierra 1500)
- 2014 – Ward's 10 Best Interiors (2014 Sierra 1500 Denali)
- 2015 – Cars.com Ultimate One-Ton Challenge Winner (2015 Sierra 3500HD Dually Duramax Diesel)
- 2015 – Most dependable full-size light-duty pickup by J.D. Power (2012 Sierra 1500)
- 2018 – Pickuptrucks.com Best Half-Ton Truck (2019 GMC Sierra 1500 SLT Crew Cab)
- 2018 – VINCENTRIC BEST FLEET VALUE IN AMERICA 3/4-TON PICKUP (2018 GMC Sierra 2500HD Crew Cab 2WD)
- 2018 – iSeeCars Top 10 Vehicles With the Lowest Depreciation (2013 GMC Sierra 1500)
- 2019 – Canadian Truck King Challenge Winner (2019 Sierra 1500 Denali 6.2-liter)
- 2020 – Ward's Best Engine Award (3.0-liter Inline-6 Duramax Diesel)
- 2021 – Kelley Blue Book Best Resale Value By Category Full-Size Heavy Duty Pickup (GMC Sierra HD)
- 2022 – Kelley Blue Book Best Resale Value Top-10 (2022 GMC Sierra)

== Motorsport ==
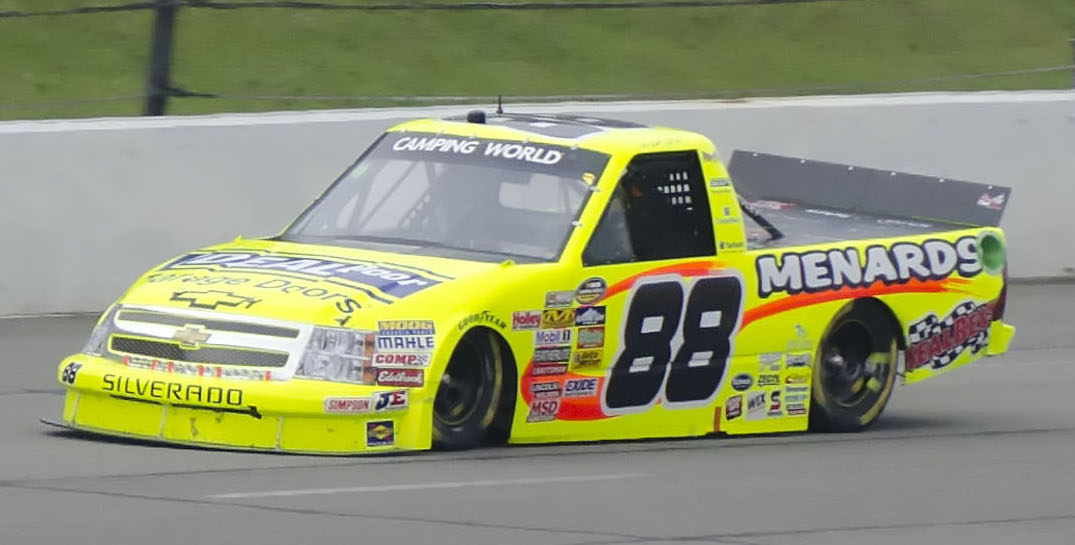
The 2011 Silverado, raced by Matt Crafton at Pocono Raceway

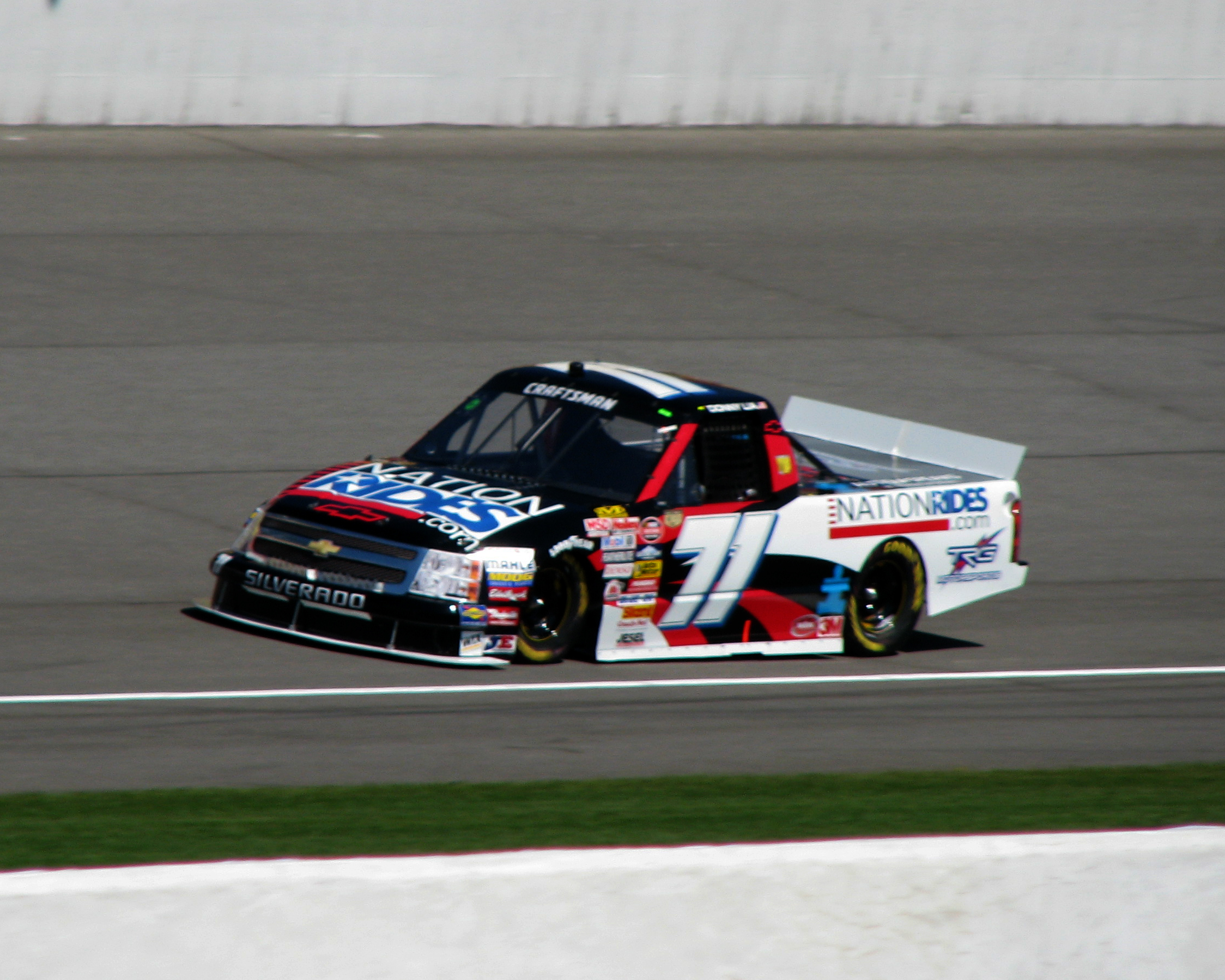
The 2008 Silverado of Donny Lia

Chevrolet is represented in the NASCAR Craftsman Truck Series by the Silverado. As of the 2021 season, 15 full-time and part-time teams use the Silverado. Chevrolet has won the Truck Series Manufacturers Championship ten times since the series inception in 1995 and Chevrolet drivers have won the Drivers Championship a combined 12 times. The Silverado was also the title sponsor for the Chevrolet Silverado 250 Truck Series race at Canadian Tire Motorsport Park.

The truck also won the Primm 300 off-road race in 2004, 2005, and 2006.

== World markets ==
As of 2015, the Chevrolet Silverado is sold in the United States, Canada, Mexico, Venezuela, Chile, and the Middle East (except Iran). As of 2022, the GMC Sierra is sold in the United States, Canada, Mexico, and the Middle East (except Israel and Iran). The GMC Sierra Denali was introduced to South Korea in 2022 with the launch of the GMC brand in the Korean market.

Chevrolet started selling the Silverado in Oceania in 2018 via Holden Special Vehicles (a former subsidiary of GM's now defunct Holden brand), and currently via GM Specialty Vehicles, though it retains the Chevrolet badge. The vehicles are sold in right-hand-drive versions for that region.

== Sales ==
Yearly sales totals in the United States
Calendar year	Chevrolet Silverado	GMC Sierra	Total
1998	538,254	160,555	698,809
1999	636,150	208,693	844,843
2000	642,119	188,907	831,026
2001	716,051	210,154	926,205
2002	652,646	202,045	854,691
2003	684,302	196,689	880,991
2004	680,768	213,756	894,524
2005	705,982	229,488	935,470
2006	636,069	210,736	846,805
2007	618,259	208,243	826,500
2008	465,065	168,544	633,609
2009	316,554	111,842	428,396
2010	370,135	129,794	499,929
2011	415,130	149,170	564,300
2012	418,312	157,185	575,497
2013	480,414	184,389	664,803
2014	529,755	211,833	741,588
2015	600,544	224,139	824,683
2016	574,876	221,680	796,556
2017	585,864	217,943	803,807
2018	585,581	219,554	805,135
2019	575,600	232,323	807,923
2020	594,094	253,016	847,110
2021	529,765	248,924	778,689
2022	523,249	241,522	764,771
2023	555,148	295,737	850,885
2024	552,836	322,946	875,782
2025	577,434	348,222	925,656
Total	15,760,956	5,975,431	21,736,387

== Examples of special uses ==
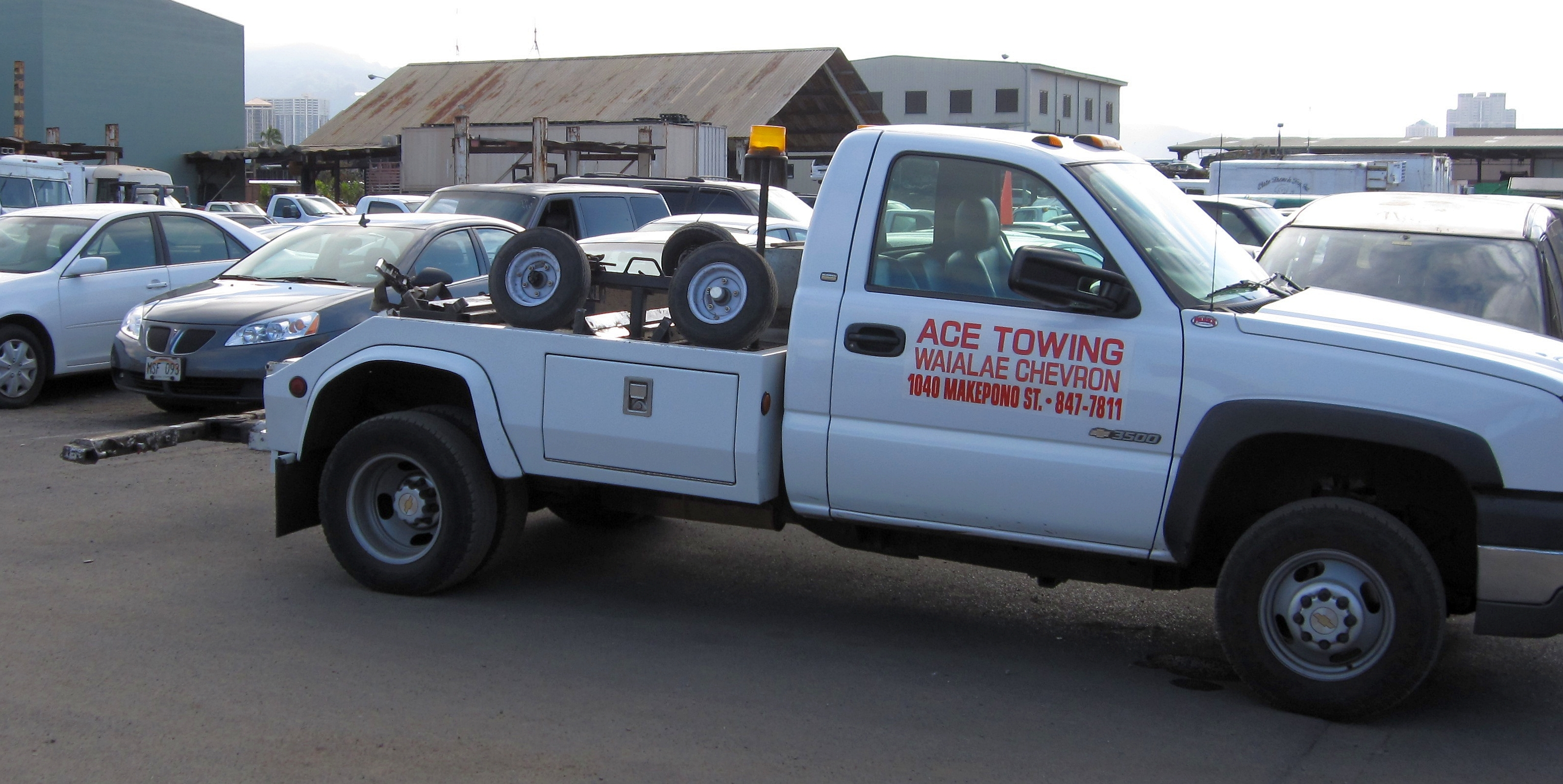
Tow truck in Honolulu, Hawaii

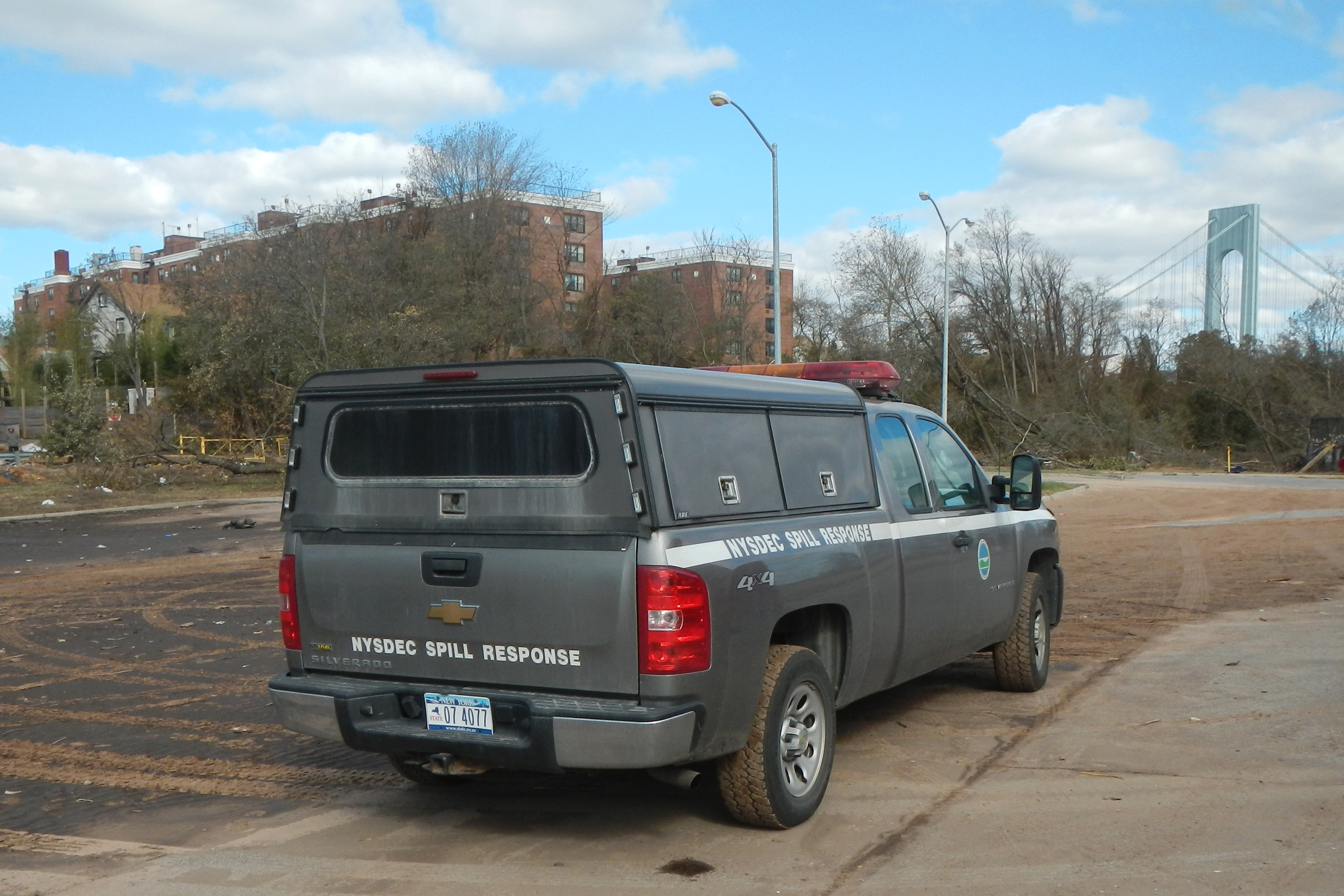
Spill response vehicle used after Hurricane Sandy, Staten Island, New York

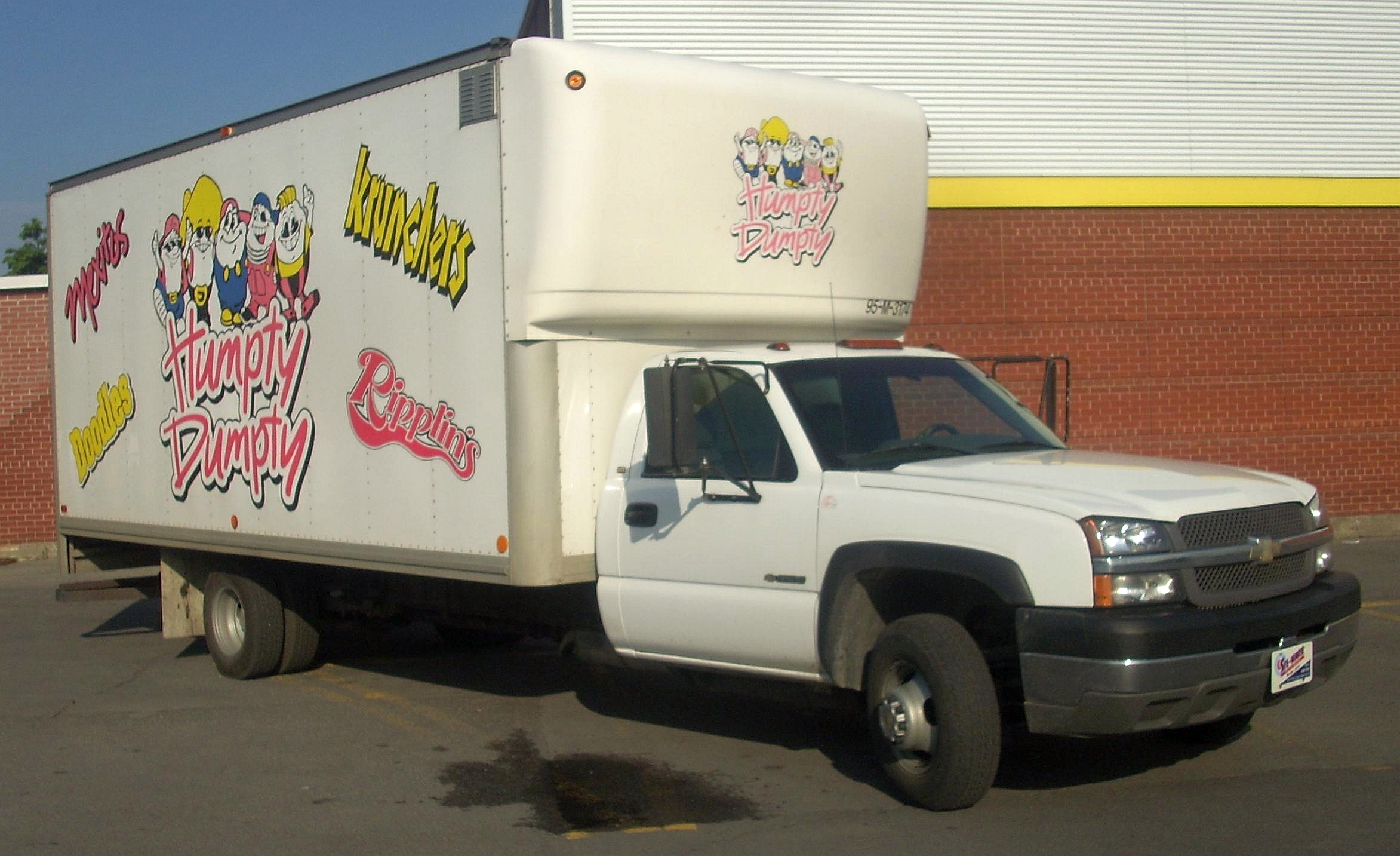
Humpty Dumpty delivery van in Montreal

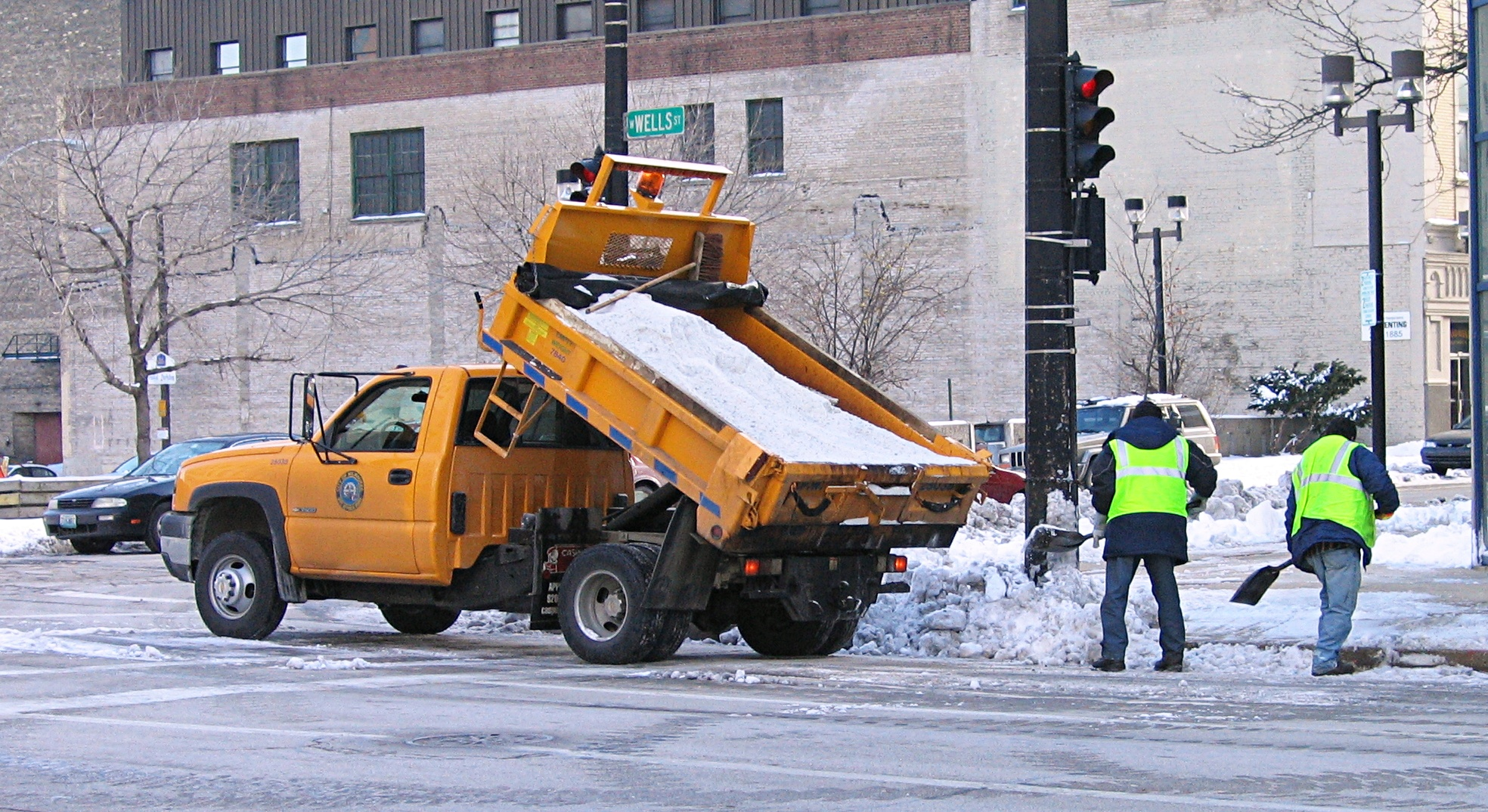
Dump truck in Milwaukee, Wisconsin

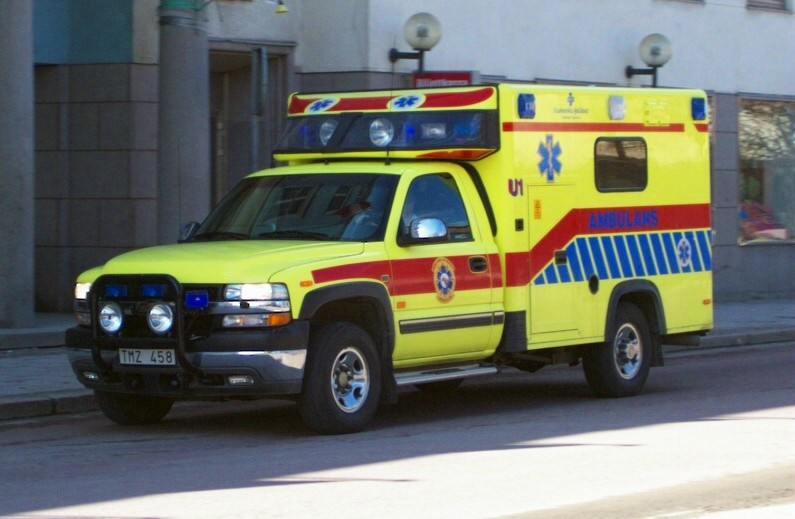
Ambulance in Uppsala, Sweden

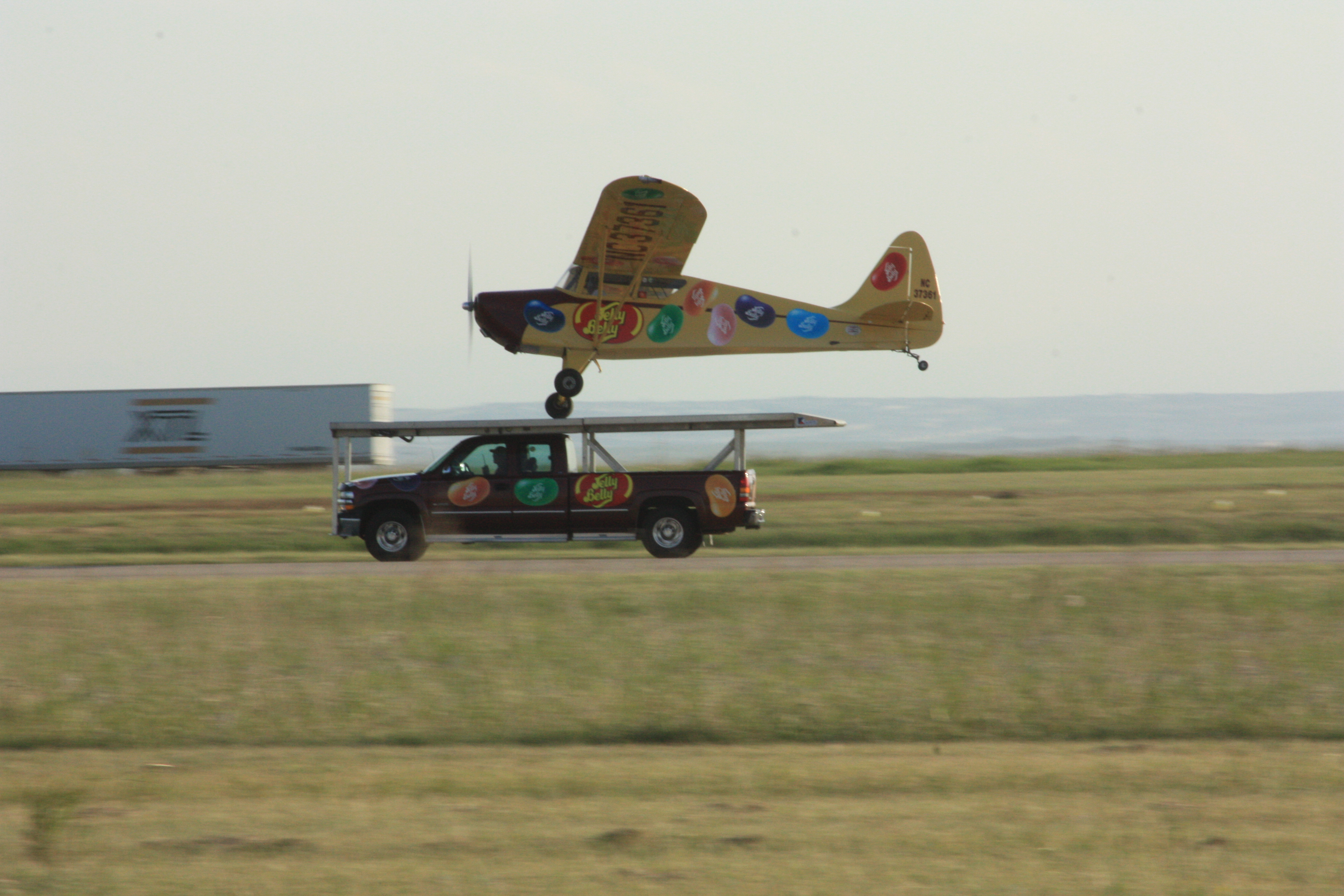
Landing an airplane in Airdrie, Alberta

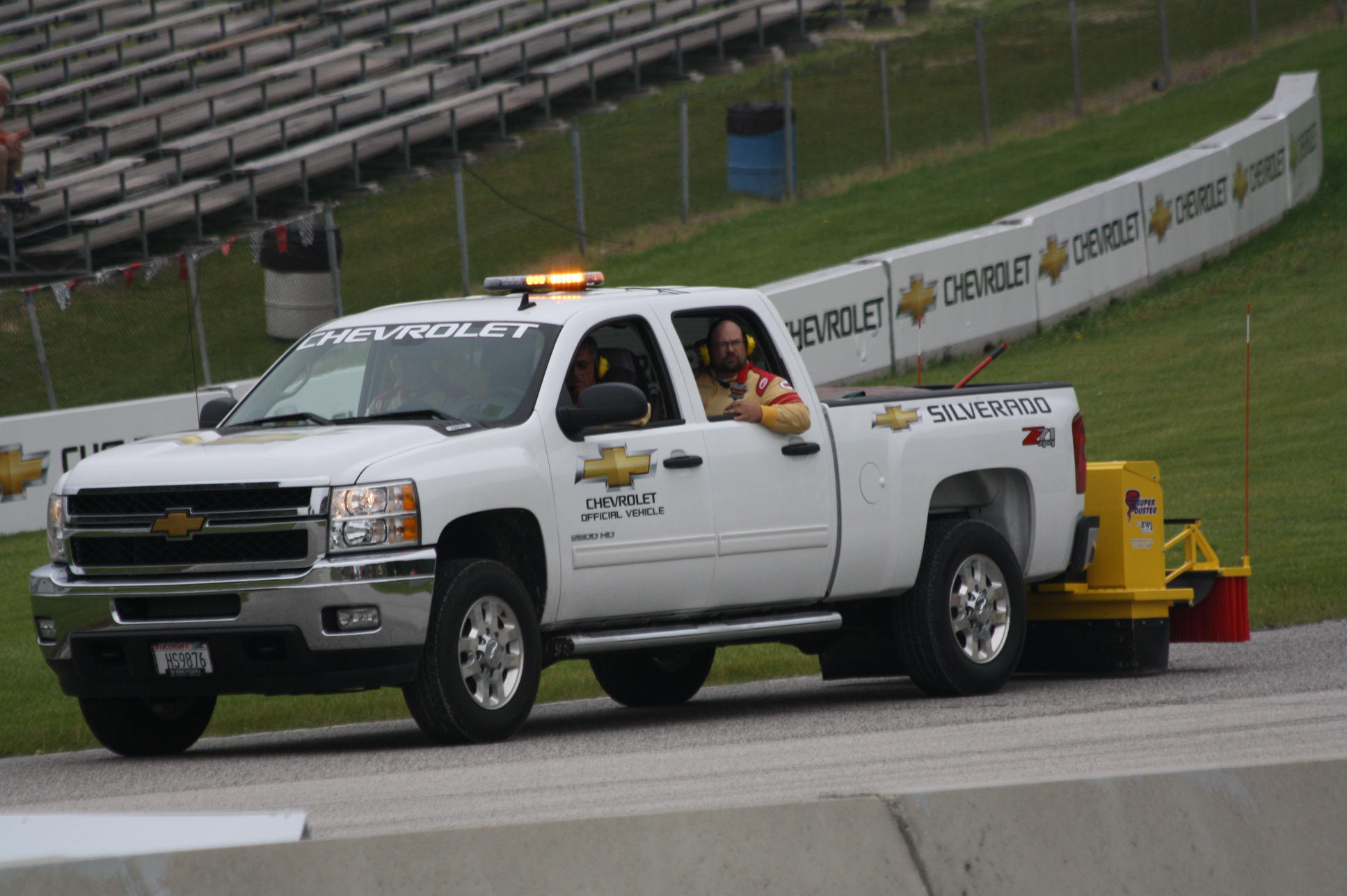
2011–2014 Silverado HD drying a race track

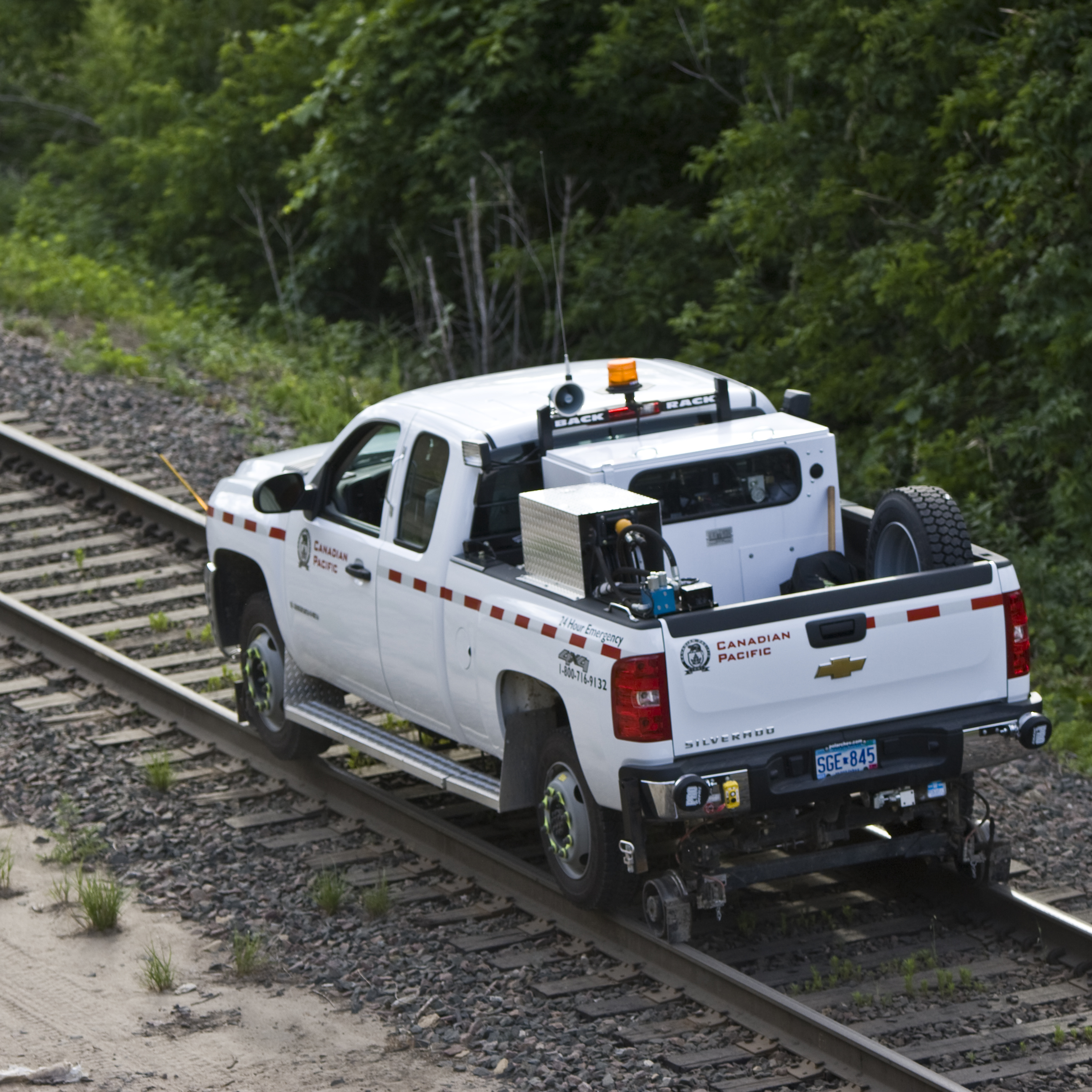
Railway vehicle

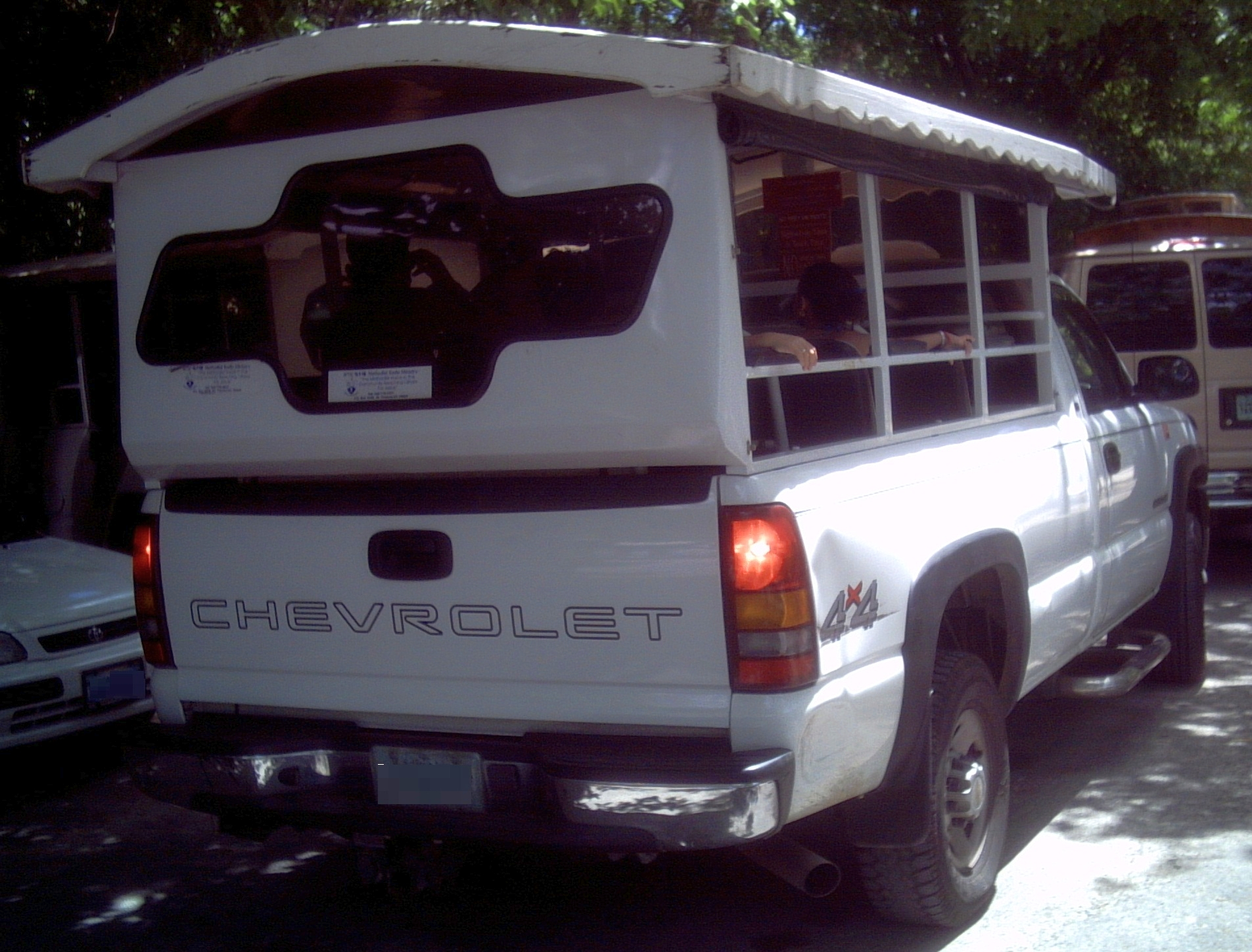
Taxi in Saint Thomas, U.S. Virgin Islands

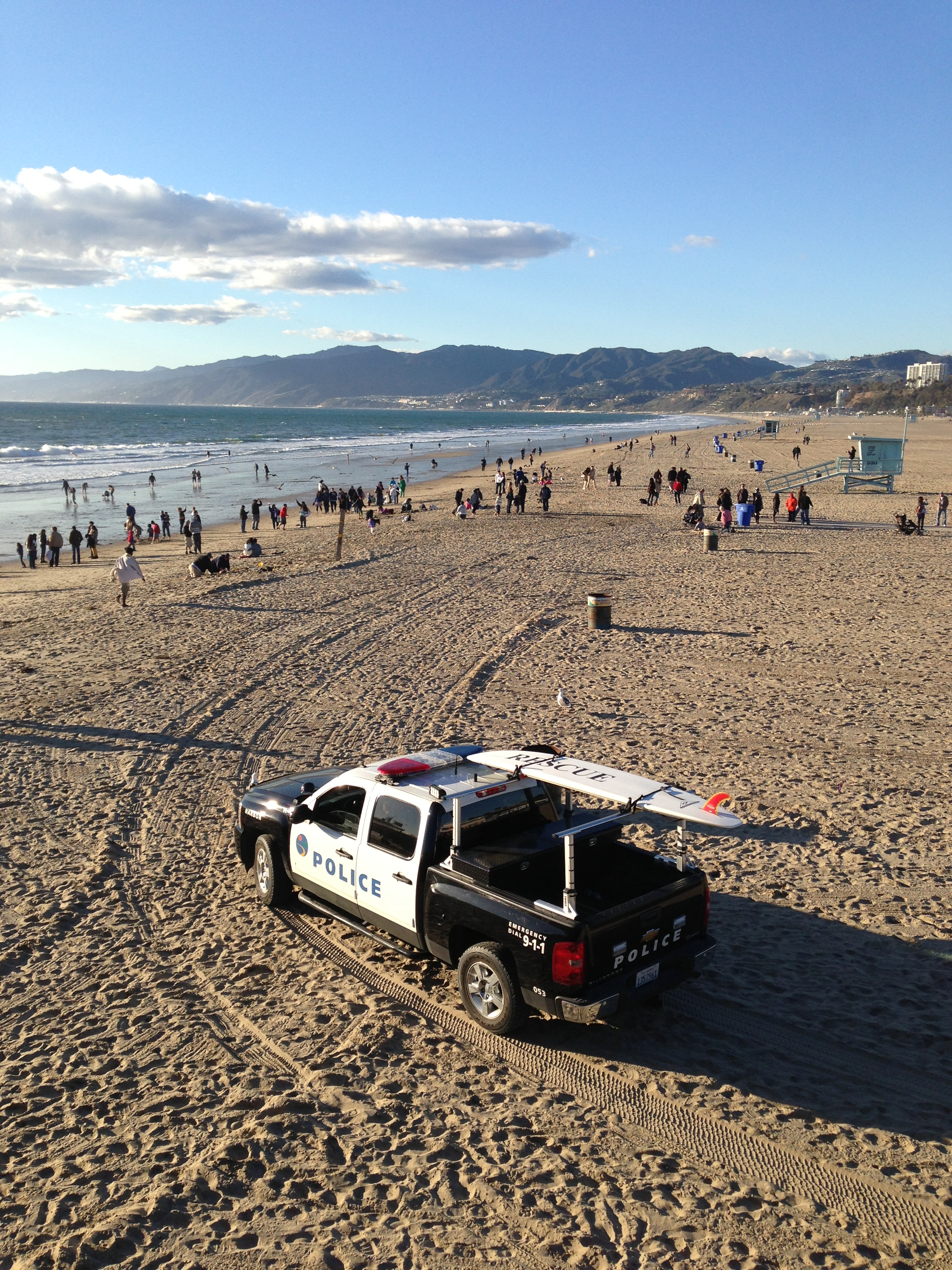
Beach patrol in Santa Monica, California

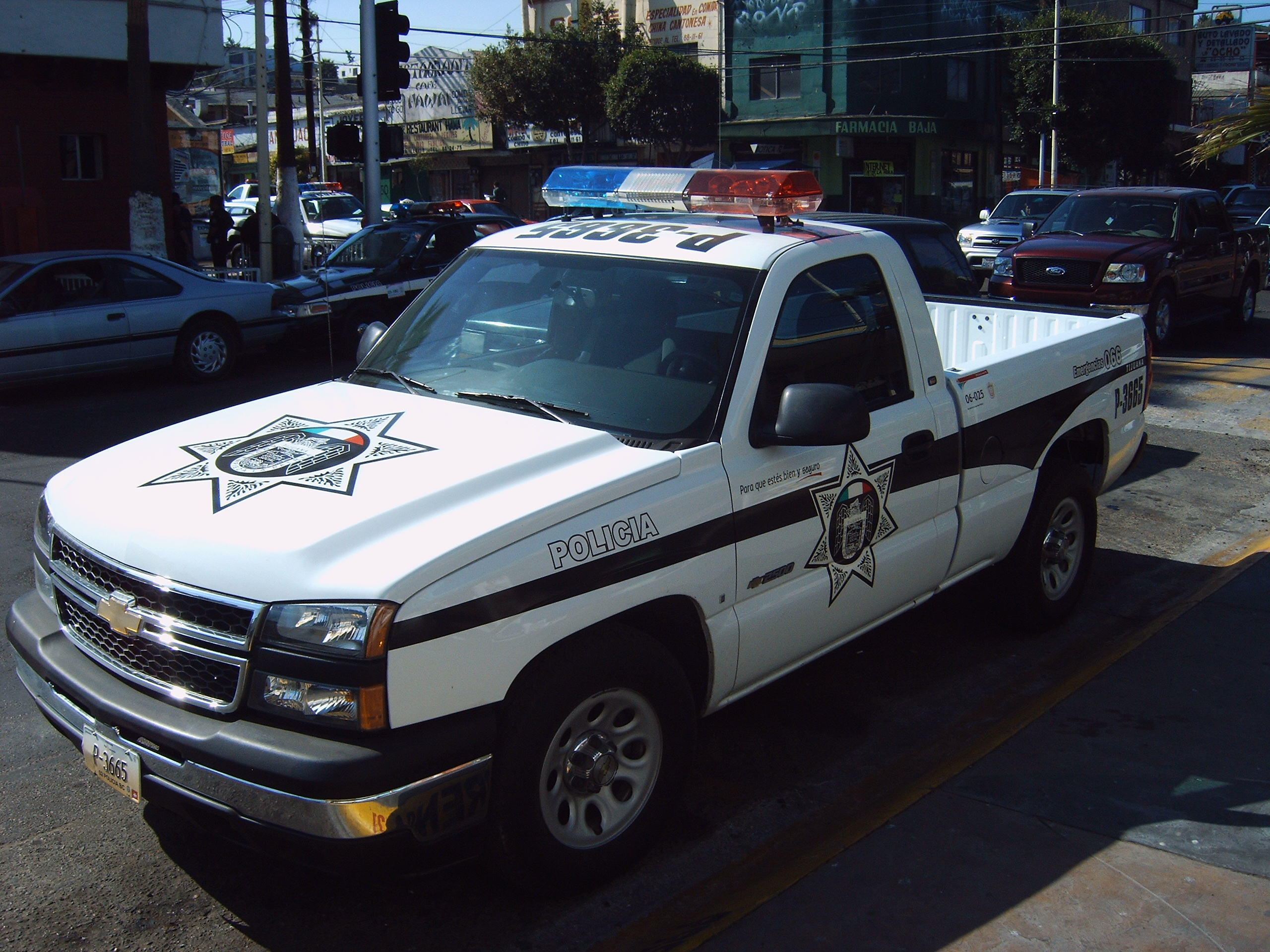
Chevrolet Cheyenne in use as a police car in Tijuana, Mexico

== See also ==
- Chevrolet Avalanche
- General Motors C/K trucks
- Chevrolet S-10/Chevrolet Colorado
- List of Chevrolet pickup trucks
- List of hybrid vehicles
- List of pickup trucks
