= Ram pickup =

American full-size pickup built by Stellantis

Dodge Ram / Ram pickup
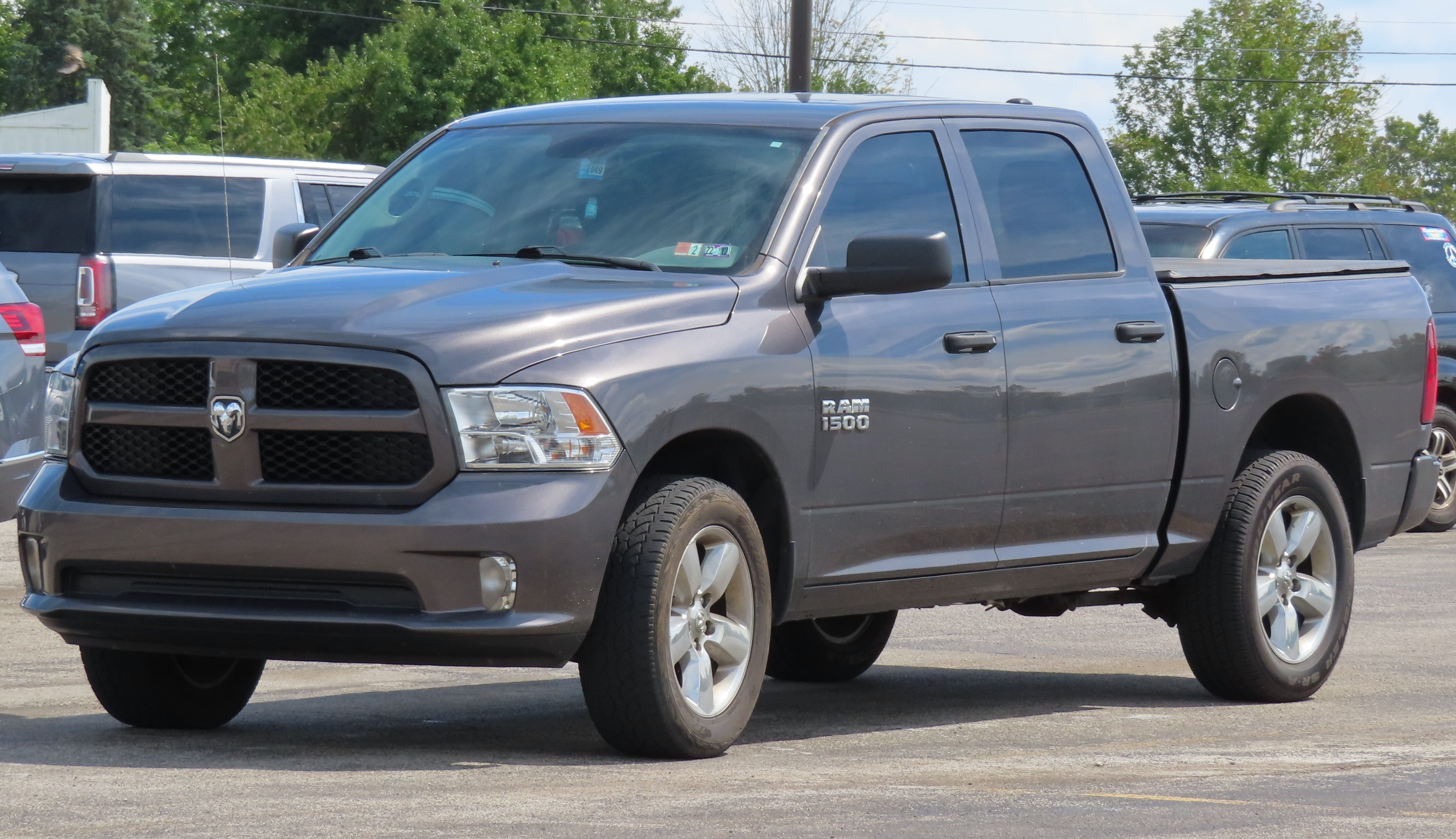
- 2017 Ram 1500 Express

Overview
- Manufacturer: Dodge/Ram Trucks (Note: Transferred to the Ram marque in 2010) (Note: Chrysler Corporation (1980–1998); DaimlerChrysler (1998–2007); Chrysler LLC (2007–2009); Chrysler Group LLC (2009–2014); FCA US LLC (2014–2021); Stellantis North America (2021–present))
- Production: October 1980 – present
- Model years: 1981–present

Body and chassis
- Class: Full-size pickup truck Heavy-duty pickup truck Medium-duty chassis cab truck (Mexico only, possibly 1998–2002)
- Layout: Front-engine, rear-wheel drive / four-wheel drive

Chronology
- Predecessor: Dodge D series

The Ram pickup (marketed as the Dodge Ram until 2010 when Ram Trucks was spun-off from Dodge) is a full-size pickup truck manufactured by Stellantis North America (formerly Chrysler Group LLC and FCA US LLC) and marketed from 2010 onwards under the Ram Trucks brand. The current fifth-generation Ram debuted at the 2018 North American International Auto Show in Detroit, Michigan, in January of that year.

Previously, Ram was part of the Dodge line of light trucks. The Ram name was introduced in October 1980 for model year 1981, when the Dodge D series pickup trucks and B series vans were rebranded, though the company had used a ram's-head hood ornament on some trucks as early as 1933.

Ram trucks have been named Motor Trend magazine's Truck of the Year eight times; the second-generation Ram won the award in 1994, the third-generation Ram heavy-duty won the award in 2003, the fourth-generation Ram Heavy Duty won in 2010 and the fourth-generation Ram 1500 won in 2013 and 2014, and the current fifth-generation Ram pickup became the first truck in history to win the award four times, winning in 2019, 2020, 2021 and most recently, 2025.

== First generation (1981; D/W) ==
First generation
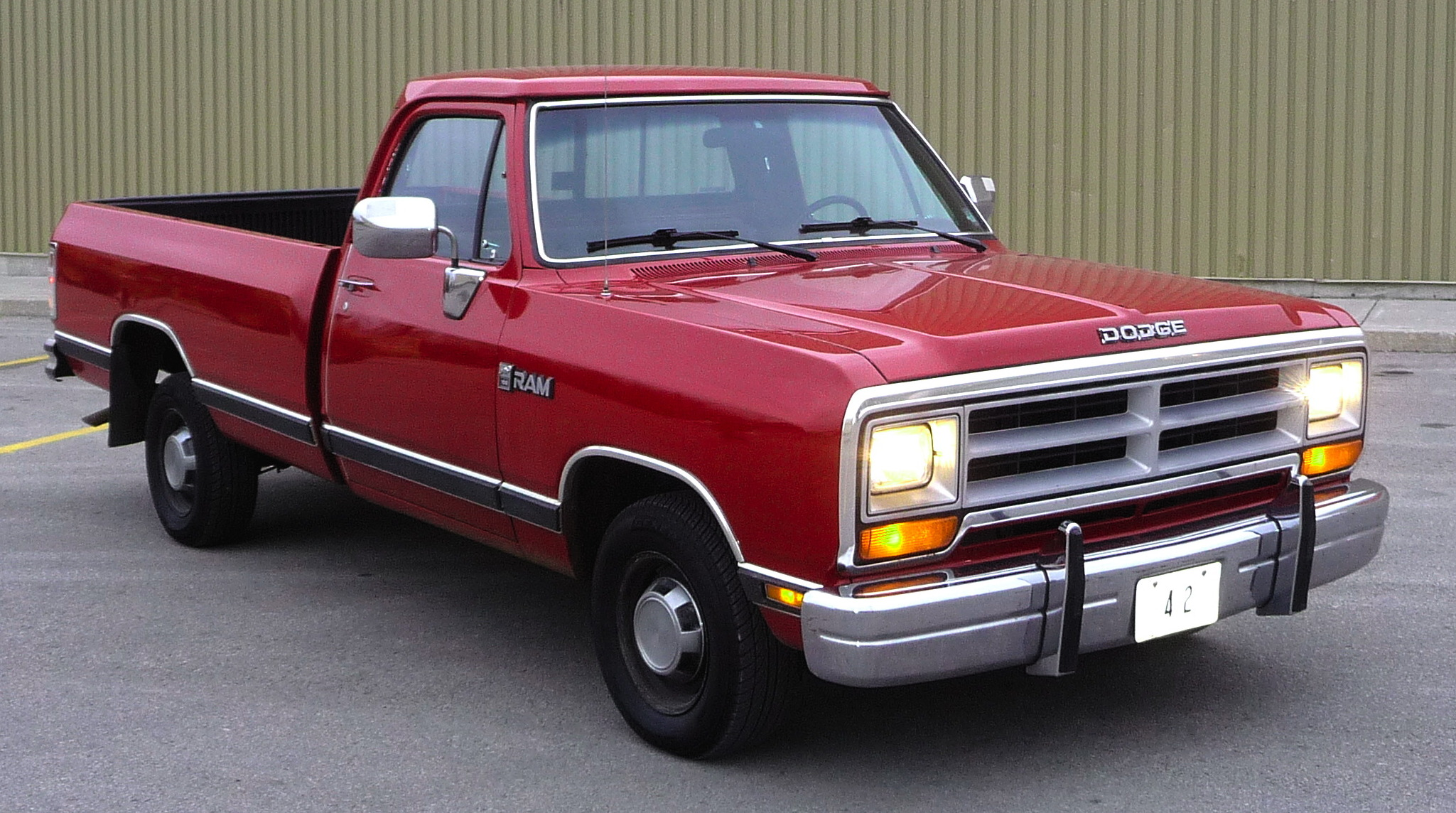
- 1989 Dodge Ram D100

Overview
- Production: October 1980 – July 1993
- Model years: 1981–1993

Body and chassis
- Body style: 2-door regular cab 2-door extended cab 4-door crew cab
- Platform: Chrysler AD platform
- Related: Dodge Ramcharger

Powertrain
- Engine: 225 cu in (3.7 L) slant-6 I6; 239 cu in (3.9 L) LA V6; 318 cu in (5.2 L) LA V8; 360 cu in (5.9 L) LA V8; 5.9 L (359 cu in) Cummins diesel I6
- Transmission: 3- or 4-speed Torqueflite automatic 4- or 5-speed manual

Dimensions
- Wheelbase: Regular cab/6.5' bed: 115 in (2,921 mm); Regular cab/8' bed: 131 in (3,327 mm); Club Cab/6.5' bed: 133 in (3,378 mm); Club Cab/8' bed: 149 in (3,785 mm); Crew cab/8' bed: 165 in (4,191 mm)
- Length: 190.8 in (4,846 mm); 210.8 in (5,354 mm)
- Width: 79.5 in (2,019 mm)
- Height: 76 in (1,930 mm); 73 in (1,854 mm)

The first-generation Dodge Ram trucks and vans introduced in October 1980 feature a Ram hood ornament first used on Dodge vehicles from 1932 until 1954. Not all of the first-generation trucks have this ornament and is most commonly seen on four-wheel-drive models. Dodge kept the previous generation's model designations: D or Ram indicate two-wheel drive while W or Power Ram indicate four-wheel drive. Just like Ford's F-Series, Dodge used "150" to indicate a half-ton truck, 250 for a three-quarter-ton truck, and 350 for a one-ton truck. The truck models were offered in standard cab, "Club" extended cab, and crew cab configurations. They also were offered along with 6.5 ft (2.0 m) and 8 ft (2.4 m) bed lengths and "Utiline" and "Sweptline" styled boxes along with standard boxes. Externally, the first-generation Rams were facelifted versions of the previous generation Dodge D-Series pickups introduced in 1972. The new model introduced larger wraparound tail lamps, dual rectangular headlamps, and squared-off body lines. Engine choices were pared down to the 225 slant-6 and 318 and 360 V8s. The interior was updated, included a new bench seat, a completely new dashboard and an instrument cluster with an optional three-pod design – a speedometer in the center, with the two side pods containing an ammeter on the top left, a temperature gauge on the bottom left, a fuel gauge on the top right and an oil pressure gauge bottom right. Models without the full gauge package had only indicator lights in the place of the temperature and oil pressure gauges. Among the options offered on the Ram were front bumper guards, a sliding rear cab window, air-conditioning, cruise control, tilt steering column, power door locks and windows, AM/FM stereo with a cassette tape player, styled road wheels, aluminum turbine-style mag wheels, special paint and stripe packages, two-tone paint, and a plow package for four-wheel-drive models (referred to as the "Sno Commander").

The "Club Cab" was dropped from the lineup after 1982, but Dodge kept the tooling and reintroduced it nearly a decade later in the 1990 models. The four-door crew cab and Utiline beds were dropped after the 1985 model year, to make room on the assembly line for the then-upcoming 1987 Dodge Dakota, and were never reintroduced in this generation.

Basic Ram 100 models were reintroduced for 1984, replacing the previous "Miser" trim level available on the Ram 150. A "Ram-Trac" shift-on-the-fly transfer case was added for the 1985 Power Rams, and both the crew cab and Utiline flared bed versions were discontinued for 1986, the latter not to return on any Chrysler-built pickup. For 1988, the slant-6 engine was replaced by a 3.9 L (240 cu in) fuel-injected V6 engine first introduced with the Dodge Dakota. The 5.2 L (318 cu in) engine, on which the 3.9 L V6 is based, also received electronic fuel injection in 1988. Because of the new computer-controlled fuel injection, ignition, and ABS system, more vehicle information needed to be displayed through any warning or notification lights; so inside the cab where a small compartment was once located on the dash, a new "message center" with four small rectangular light spots, contained the check engine light and other tell-tales including one for the parking brake and the ABS if the truck was so equipped. The message center later included "wait to start" and "water in fuel" lights on diesel models. Diagnostic fault codes were stored in the computer's memory, and cycling the ignition key three times allowed the computer to flash the trouble codes through the check-engine light for diagnosis of some problems. Rear ABS became standard equipment on 250 and 350 models for 1989.

The Ram 100 model designation was dropped and these models folded back into the 150 range for 1990, due to the introduction and sales success of the Dodge Dakota pickup. Additionally, the instrument cluster was slightly revised; the ammeter was replaced by a voltmeter while maintaining the 3-pod arrangement of the speedometer and gauges. Also for 1990, Dodge reintroduced the Club Cab, equipped with fold-out jump seats for the 1991–1993 models. Entry was made through the passenger or driver's doors because there were no rear doors for this configuration. For 1991, all versions received standard rear-wheel anti-lock brakes.

These trucks, though popular with fleets, sold poorly compared to the Ford F-Series and the General Motors C/K trucks, with sales rarely breaking 100,000 units for most years of their production. Part of this was due to the dated cab and chassis design which had been in production since 1972, the lack of a powerful diesel option until 1989, and the lack of a big-block gasoline V8 option. Additionally, the interior had been given few updates since the October 1980 market launch.

=== Engines and transmissions ===
For 1989, the 5.9 L V8 received throttle-body fuel injection for a 20 hp (15 kW) gain, while the 3.9 L V6 became standard on W100 and W150 pickups. Additionally, Dodge introduced a new overdrive automatic transmission for reduced fuel consumption. This light-duty transmission was designated the A500, and was offered with the 3.9 L V6 and 5.2 L V8. An "O/D off" pushbutton switch to lock out the overdrive 4th gear was added to the message center. The A727 automatic saw continued use for some 5.2 L engines, all 5.9 L engines, and heavy-duty applications.

The grille was redesigned for 1991 but kept the large rectangular headlamps and crossbar appearance. The engines were substantially upgraded for 1992 (3.9 L and 5.2 L) and 1993 (5.9 L) with multi-port fuel injection, new manifolds, and higher-compression cylinder heads for noticeably higher output. These newly revised engines were marketed under the "Magnum" name. A heavy-duty automatic transmission with overdrive called the A518 was offered with the 5.2 L and 5.9 L engines. As part of Chrysler's overhaul of corporate transmission nomenclature, the A500 and A518 were redesignated 42RH and 46RH, respectively, in 1992. The initial 4 signified a 4-speed transmission, the second digit identified the transmission's relative torque capacity, the letter R in the third position denoted a rear-wheel-drive transmission, and the final letter H signified hydraulic shift control. The 3-speed automatic remained available; the A727 was redesignated 36RH, and the A904, A998, and A999 became the 30RH, 31RH, and 32RH, respectively.

==== Cummins Turbo Diesel ====
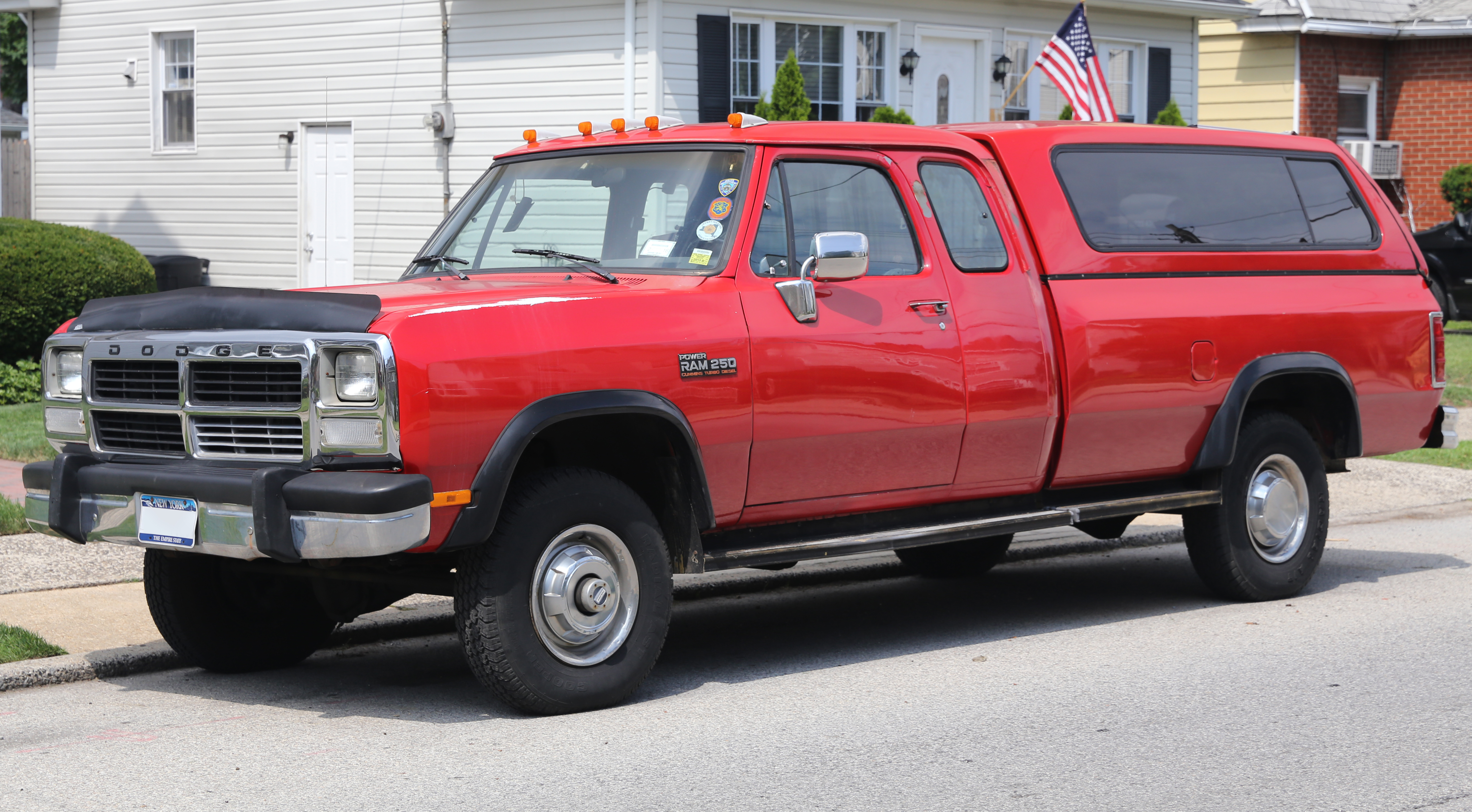
1993 Dodge Power Ram 250 Cummins Turbo Diesel club cab

After 1978, the Chrysler RB engine was discontinued and therefore no longer offered in Dodge pickup trucks. Without a "big-block" gasoline engine or diesel, Dodge's heavier-duty models had a severe power disadvantage over the competition, and thus began losing potential customers in the commercial market. Rather than developing a brand-new engine, Chrysler signed a deal with commercial engine manufacturer Cummins to use a version of its 5.9 L B Series engine in the Ram trucks. This proved to be a mutually beneficial deal, allowing Cummins to expand its product output and Dodge to have a competitive engine for its heavy-duty models. The introduction of the Cummins Turbo Diesel model in 1989 coincided with the first sales increase for Ram trucks in several years. The Cummins was coupled with a heavier-duty version of the A727 automatic or a 5-speed manual transmission and was available on 250 and 350 pickups and pickup-based chassis-cab trucks above 8,500 pounds GVWR. This diesel engine option was different from the diesel engines offered in Ford and GM trucks in that the Cummins features direct injection, whereas the Ford and GM diesels feature indirect injection. This also means that the Cummins does not have to rely on glow plugs. The Cummins is a straight-six engine, whereas the GM and Ford diesel engines are V8 engines. Additionally, the Cummins is turbocharged, while the 6.2L GM/DDC and 7.3 L IDI Ford/IH are naturally aspirated.

This was not actually the first engine to debut in Dodge pickup trucks as a diesel option. The 1978 D-series models were available with a Mitsubishi naturally-aspirated diesel, but it was seldom ordered. The Cummins diesel was in short supply the first two years, but for 1991, Dodge managed to ramp up production.

Partway through the 1991 model year, Dodge started using 350 (one-ton) frames in Ram 250 Cummins and Club Cab models.

==== Engines ====
Model years	Engine	Power	Torque
1981–1987	225 cu in (3.7 L) Slant-6 I6	95 hp (71 kW)	170 lb⋅ft (230 N⋅m)
1988–1991	239 cu in (3.9 L) LA V6	125 hp (93 kW)	195 lb⋅ft (264 N⋅m)
1992–1993	239 cu in (3.9 L) Magnum V6	175 hp (130 kW)	225 lb⋅ft (305 N⋅m)
1981–1987	318 cu in (5.2 L) LA V8	140 hp (104 kW)	240 lb⋅ft (325 N⋅m)
1988–1991	318 cu in (5.2 L) LA V8	170 hp (127 kW)	260 lb⋅ft (353 N⋅m)
1992–1993	318 cu in (5.2 L) Magnum V8	230 hp (172 kW)	280 lb⋅ft (380 N⋅m)
1981–1988	360 cu in (5.9 L) LA V8	175 hp (130 kW)	260 lb⋅ft (353 N⋅m)
1989–1992	360 cu in (5.9 L) LA V8	190 hp (142 kW)	292 lb⋅ft (396 N⋅m)
1993	360 cu in (5.9 L) Magnum V8	230 hp (172 kW)	325 lb⋅ft (441 N⋅m)
1989–1993	359 cu in (5.9 L) Cummins 6BT I6	160 hp (119 kW)	400 lb⋅ft (542 N⋅m)

Gallery

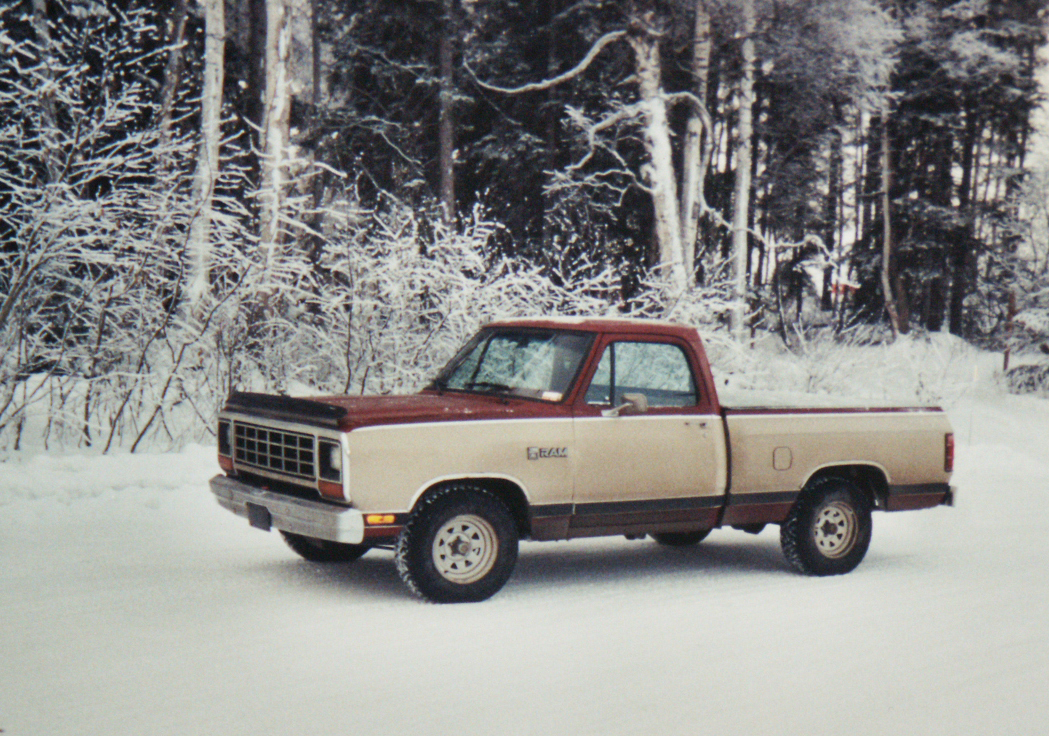
1983 Dodge Ram D150

1983 Dodge Ram D350 Crew Cab Dual Rear Wheel

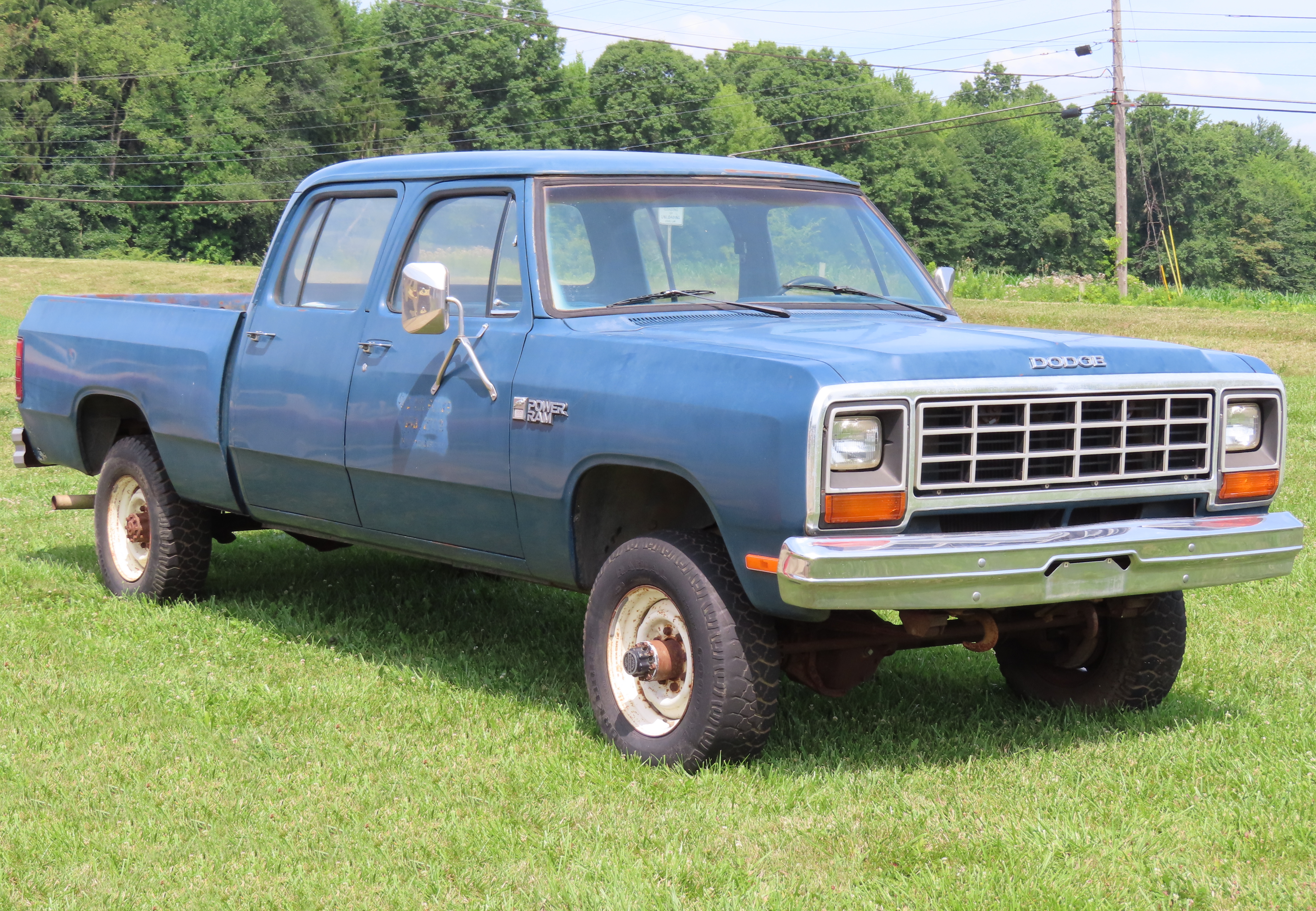
1985 Dodge Power Ram 350 Custom crew cab

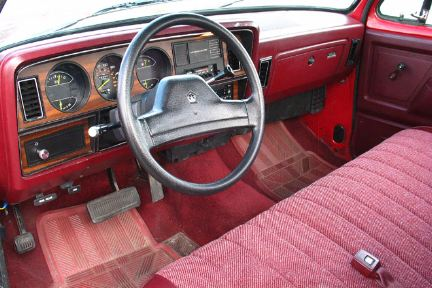
1989 Dodge Ram interior

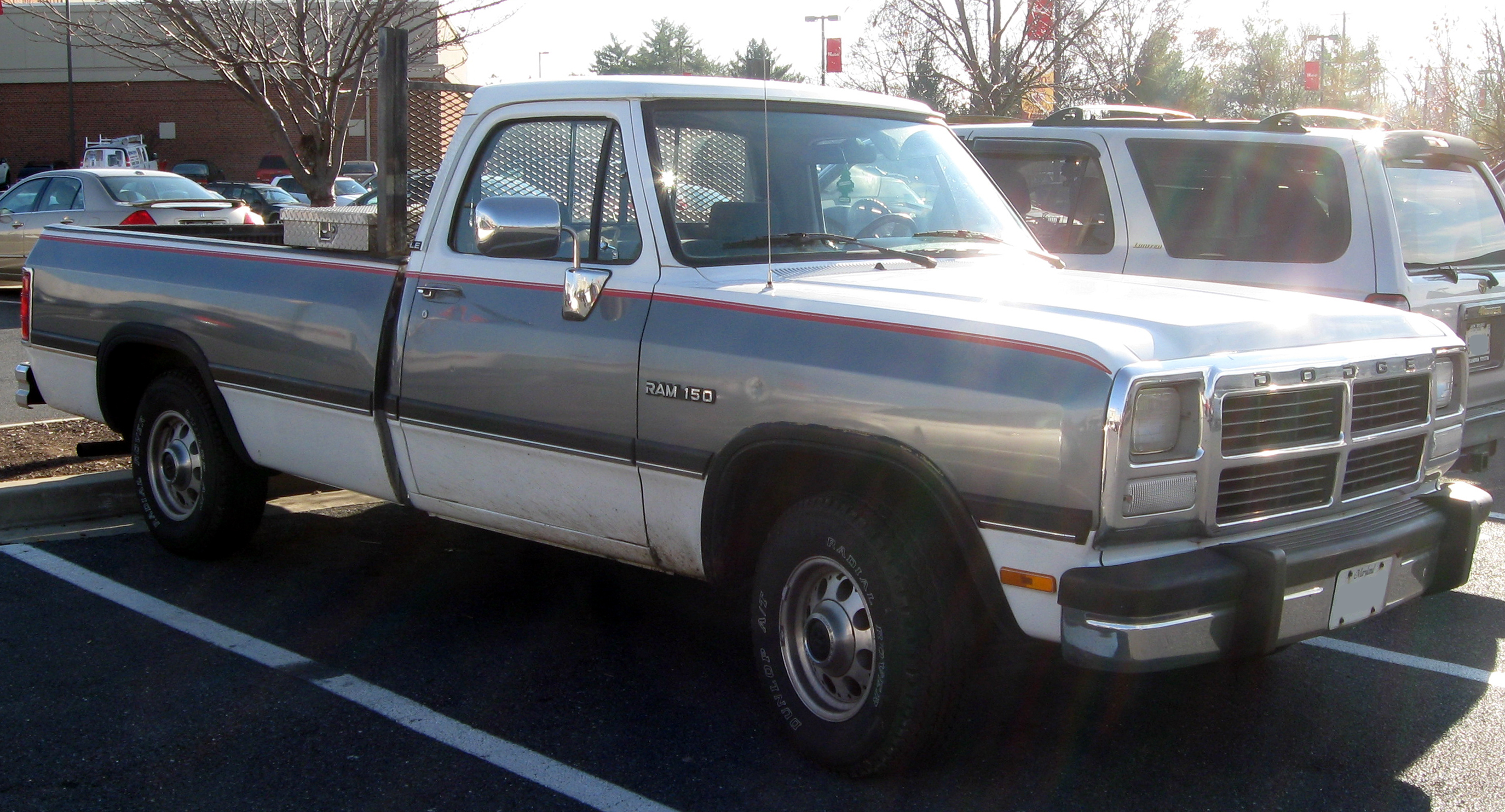
1991–1993 Dodge Ram 150, showing facelifted grille

=== Special editions ===
- Prospector – Prospector was a package available throughout the 1980s that usually included a different fuel tank, cloth seat, and carpeting. In the late 1980s, a light package and the large 6×9 mirrors were added to the list of options. This trim package was carried on until the end of production in 1993.

== Second generation (1994; BR/BE) ==
Second generation
- 1995–1997 Dodge Ram 1500 Club Cab

Overview
- Production: July 1993 – July 2001 (1500); July 1993 – July 2002 (2500 / 3500)
- Model years: 1994–2002
- Assembly: United States: Fenton, Missouri (Saint Louis Assembly); Warren, Michigan (Warren Truck Assembly); Mexico: Mexico City (Lago Alberto Assembly); Saltillo (Saltillo Truck Assembly)
- Designer: Phillip Payne (1989)

Body and chassis
- Body style: 2-door regular cab (1994–2002); 2-door Club Cab (1995–2002); 4-door Quad Cab (1998–2002)
- Related: Dodge Ramcharger (Mexico)

Powertrain
- Engine: Gasoline: 3.9 L (239 cu in) Magnum V6; 5.2 L (318 cu in) Magnum V8; 5.9 L (360 cu in) Magnum V8; 8.0 L (488 cu in) Magnum V10; Diesel: 5.9 L (359 cu in) Cummins ISB turbo I6
- Transmission: 4-speed TorqueFlite 42RH-RE automatic; 4-speed TorqueFlite 46RH-RE automatic; 4-speed TorqueFlite 47RH-RE automatic; 5-speed New Venture Gear 3500 manual; 5-speed New Venture Gear 4500 manual; 6-speed New Venture Gear 5600 manual; 5-speed Tremec TR-4050 manual

Dimensions
- Wheelbase: 118.7–154.7 in (3,010–3,930 mm)
- Length: 204.1–244.1 in (5,180–6,200 mm)
- Width: 79.3 or 93.8 in (2,010 or 2,380 mm)
- Height: 71.5 or 74.5 in (1,820 or 1,890 mm)

The second-generation Dodge Ram began development in 1986. The original concept, dubbed the "Louisville Slugger" by Chrysler's Advanced Packaging Studio, was to be a modular platform that would accommodate a full-size truck and full-size van, which would have provided a roomy cab and cargo bed. The modular design was scrapped in 1987 and was replaced with a more conventional truck design when the design was moved to the American Motors design studio. The more conventional design, dubbed "Phoenix", was originally scheduled for a 1991 production; when Bob Lutz showed it to the new styling designers, chief designer Phillip E. Payne told him, "It looks like nothing more than a rehash of everybody else's truck." At that, Lutz told him he had six months to come up with something better. The exterior styling of the truck that was eventually released was the result of design concepts by Payne during 1988–1990. A review by the Dodge pick-up truck studio designers felt that modern pick-ups looked "too flat and sedan-like", while the early 1950s Studebaker pick-up and the semi-trailer trucks had just the right "macho" look to them. The design included a big-rig style front end and a large grille that was deemed risky at its introduction, but ultimately proved popular with consumers.

Debuted on January 5, 1993, at the North American International Auto Show and going on sale on October 1, 1993, the redesigned 1994 Ram was a sales success and was named "Truck of the Year" by Motor Trend in 1994. Sales increased from 95,542 units in 1993 to 232,092 in 1994, 410,000 in 1995, and 411,000 by 1996. The latter third year, it was prominently shown as the hero vehicle in the film Twister, as well as the CBS television series Walker, Texas Ranger. Sales of this generation peaked at just over 400,000 in 1999 before declining against the redesigned Ford and GM trucks. By 2001, Ram sales figures trailed those of Ford and GM trucks.

The engine offerings were carried over from the last generation, which were the 3.9L V6, 5.2L V8, 5.9L V8, and 5.9L I6 Cummins turbo diesel options. Added to the lineup was a 300 hp (220 kW) 8.0L gasoline V10 designed as an alternative for those who wanted superior pulling power, but did not want a diesel (similar to GM's 7.4L V8), thus making the former the first factory V10 truck. The V10 and diesel were available in 2500/3500 models above 8,500 pounds GVWR. Models were now the 1500 half-ton, 2500 three-quarter-ton, and 3500 dual-rear-wheel only one-ton in both two- and four-wheel drive. Ram 1500s offered both short 6.5-foot (2.0 m) and long 8-foot (2.4 m) cargo beds on both regular and extended Club Cabs, Ram 2500s offered only long beds with regular cabs or a choice of beds on Club Cabs, and Ram 3500s only offered long beds on both cabs.

Dodge offered the 2500 series in two different GVWRs (7,500 and 8,800 pounds) from 1994 to 1996. The heavy-duty 2500 effectively took the place of the discontinued one-ton single-rear-wheel trucks. Rear axles for the light-duty 2500 trucks were semi-floating, while the heavy-duty 2500 rear axles were full-floating. Light-duty 2500 trucks shared the frame with the 1500, were only available in regular cabs in two- or four-wheel drive, and were equipped with either the 5.2L or 5.9L V8 engine. All Ram 2500s and 3500s had eight-lug wheels.

The front axle continued to use an independent coil-sprung double-wishbone suspension on 2WD pickups, but the leaf springs on 4WD models were replaced with coil springs. Ram 3500 chassis-cab models now used a solid, coil-sprung front axle and the same frame on 2WD and 4WD models.

On the inside, special attention was paid to in-cab storage features, with a large glovebox, a center armrest storage area, and extra storage space behind the seat.

=== 1998 updates ===
In 1998, Dodge introduced the 4-door Quad Cab, which used smaller clamshell doors directly behind the main doors. This was the first extended cab pickup to have four doors (the 2-door Club Cab remained available through 2002). Other changes for 1998 included new rounded black plastic sideview mirrors, new plastic fold-out towing mirrors, a revised interior and instrument panel, dual airbags, a chime replacing the buzzer for seat belts/door ajar/headlights, and a digital odometer. The OBD-II system was also standard, with a computer port near the driver's-side footwell and a code-checking system via the new digital odometer readout.

In late 1998, Dodge introduced a revised front end for the 1999 model year Sport models with a restyled bumper, quad-beam clear-lens headlamps, and body-color grille. A 6-speed manual transmission was made optional for diesel models in late 2000 for the 2001 model year. A small percentage of the diesel engines for the 1999 and 2000 model years were subject to problems with the water jackets and fuel injectors. The most problematic was the "53" stamped engine block which had a defect that would cause fracturing in the structure of the block itself.

The 2000 models offered the option of heated leather seats. The braking system was upgraded to dual-piston calipers in the front. An Off-Road Edition was offered as a package with a 2-inch lift, accomplished with stiffer front springs and rear lift blocks, unique 17×8" wheels, 275/70/17 all-terrain tires, 4.10:1 rear axle ratio, trussed Dana 44 front axle, limited-slip differential, and skid plates. The Off-Road Edition models are also distinguishable with an additional "Off Road" decal on the tailgate under the 4×4 decal. The 2000 model was cut short, ending production in January 2000 to avoid a CAFE requirement. After that, 2001 models began production, with models built after July 1, 2000, featuring rear vented disc brakes.

While Dodge introduced a new Ram 1500 for 2002, the second-generation Ram was carried over for the 2002 heavy-duty 2500 and 3500 trucks. The new third-generation Ram would not debut in the 2500 or 3500 series until 2003. Part of this delay was due to the then-new 5.7-liter Hemi engine not being ready for production.

==== Mexico-only applications ====
Unencumbered by CAFE (Corporate Average Fuel Economy) restrictions, DaimlerChrysler's Mexican subsidiary developed a three-door SUV version of the Ram, called the Ramcharger as was its predecessor. It debuted in 1998, but was never available in the United States.

There were also medium-duty Ram trucks that were only manufactured and marketed in Mexico. Built in the Saltillo Plant from 1994 until 1998, the medium-duty Dodge Ram 6500 and 7000 had a grille almost twice as tall as the original, and sizable filler plates beneath the headlights to accommodate the much taller chassis and engine. The range included a 3500 and 4000 with the 5.9-liter V8 with 245 hp (183 kW) at 4,000 rpm and a four-speed manual transmission; these look quite similar to the US version, albeit on a heftier chassis. Payloads are 3,041 and 3,274 kg (6,704 and 7,218 lb) respectively. The much larger 6500 and 7000 have a bigger engine, available to run on LPG.

=== Drivetrain ===
==== Transmissions ====
Ram automatic transmissions are labeled such that the first number indicates the number of gears (including overdrive), the second number is the capacity rating, and the last letter is either E for electronic or H for hydraulic. Whereas the manual transmissions are labeled such that the first number indicates the torque capacity rating and the second number indicates the total number of gears (including O/D). The NV in the beginning of the name stands for New Venture Gear, which is a line of transmissions created by General Motors and Chrysler.

- A500/42RH-RE lower geared light-duty applications found behind the 3.9 L V6. The 42RE + RH are both 4-speed automatic transmissions with identical gear ratios. This transmission came available in 1989 and it is paired with a 10.75-inch diameter torque converter. The RH is a hydraulic governor system that is rated as a medium-duty transmission. The RE is an electronic hydraulic system that is considered for heavy-duty use. Both transmissions are also used in the Dodge Dakota and Jeep Cherokee among other Chrysler models. Gear ratios in both transmissions are 2.74:1 for first gear, 1.54:1 for second gear, 1.00:1 for third gear, and 0.69:1 for fourth gear.
- A518/46RH-RE for more heavy-duty applications found behind the 5.2 L and 5.9 L V8 engines. The 46RH and RE are 4-speed automatics that were born from the A518 family. The A727 was replaced by the A518 family in the early 1990s. The 46RH was the first to replace the A727 and was preceded by the 46RE. The improvement with both models included the overdrive being added. The difference in the two transmissions was the RH had a hydraulically controlled governor versus the computer-controlled one on the RE.
- A618/47RH-RE for heavy-duty use behind the V10 gasoline and Cummins diesel engines. The 47RH was used in the 1994 and 1995 model years, while the 47RE was used from 1996 through 2002. The 47RH was released first and was only used in the Ram 2500 and 3500 series trucks. The transmission was able to produce 450 lb-ft of torque and was able to tow trailers up to 19,000 pounds. This transmission was rated to be the highest capacity in the one-ton series of trucks produced by any manufacturer. The RH was a hydraulically operated 3-speed transmission with a hydraulically controlled overdrive gear. The RH was later replaced by the RE however it was by name only since they are both hydraulically controlled.

The NV3500 was offered in 1500 and light-duty 2500 trucks. The NV4500 was standard in heavy-duty 2500 and 3500 trucks; the NV4500HD for V10 and diesel models. An NV5600 was offered in 1999 and 2000 Rams and was the only transmission offered behind the High Output diesel in 2001 and 2002.

For Mexico the manual transmission options were made by Tremec with the Tremec TR-3340 offered from 1994 to 1999 in 1500 trucks, the Tremec 199A offered from 1994 to 2001 in 1500, 3500 and 4000 trucks, the Tremec TR-3450 used from 2000 to 2002 in 1500 trucks and the Tremec TR-4050 used on the Ram 4000 for the 2002 model year.

==== Transfer cases ====
There were a total of five transfer cases available for the four-wheel-drive Ram. All are part-time and have a low range of 2.72:1. The 1500 featured an NP231 and NP231HD. The NP241 was standard on V8 3500s. The 2500 and 3500 V10 and diesel featured an NP241DLD from 1993 until 1997. In 1997, the NP241DHD became an option for 2500s and was standard on 3500s from 1998 to 2002.

==== Axles ====
The Dodge Ram features a wide variety of axles. For the front axle of 4×4 Rams, a Dana 44 was used on all 1500s and the early (light-duty) 2500s. However, most of the 2500 and all 3500 Rams use Dana 60 front axles. The 1500s and some early light-duty 2500s used a 9.25 Chrysler (Spicer) axle in the rear. A Dana 60 rear axle was used on heavy-duty 2500s with the 5.9L V8. A Dana 70 rear axle was used in 2500s with a V10 or diesel and automatic transmission combination. A Dana 80 rear axle was used on 2500s with a manual transmission and V10 or diesel engine combination. Every 3500 was made with a Dana 80. The front-drive axles in 3500s were unique in the fact they did not have locking hubs, but featured a center axle disconnect. The 2002 2500s and 3500s saw the eventual phase-out of the center axle disconnect, in favor of front axles that were permanently locked in. Dodge continued to include front axles like this for its 2500 through 5500 trucks until the 2013 models.

=== Engines ===
A natural-gas-powered engine debuted for the 1995 model year, but was not popular and was only used in fleet vehicles on a limited production run. The Cummins B Series engine was switched from the 12-valve to the 24-valve (ISB) version in the middle of the 1998 model-year Dodge Rams to comply with emissions regulations. The ISB featured a new computer-controlled electronic injection pump and a 24-valve head design.

Model years	Engine	Power	Torque	8th VIN
1994–2001	3.9 L (239 cu in) Magnum V6	175 hp (130 kW; 177 PS)	225 lb⋅ft (305 N⋅m)	X
1994–2001	5.2 L (318 cu in) Magnum V8	230 hp (172 kW; 233 PS)	295 lb⋅ft (400 N⋅m)	Y
1995–1997	5.2 L (318 cu in) natural gas V8	200 hp (149 kW; 203 PS)		
1994–1997	5.9 L (360 cu in) Magnum V8	230 hp (172 kW; 233 PS)	330 lb⋅ft (447 N⋅m)	Z (5 for the heavy-duty version)
1998–2002	5.9 L (360 cu in) Magnum V8	245 hp (183 kW; 248 PS)	335 lb⋅ft (454 N⋅m)	Z (5 for the heavy-duty version)
1994–2002	8.0 L (488 cu in) Magnum V10 engine	300 hp (224 kW; 304 PS) (1994–1998); 310 hp (230 kW; 310 PS) (1999–2002)	450 lb⋅ft (610 N⋅m)	W
1994–1995	5.9 L (359 cu in) Cummins 12-valve diesel I6	175 hp (130 kW; 177 PS) (manual), 160 hp (119 kW; 162 PS) (auto)	420 lb⋅ft (569 N⋅m) (manual), 400 lb⋅ft (542 N⋅m) (auto)	C
1996–1998	5.9 L (359 cu in) Cummins 12-valve diesel I6	215 hp (160 kW; 218 PS) (manual), 180 hp (134 kW; 182 PS) (auto)	440 lb⋅ft (597 N⋅m) (manual), 420 lb⋅ft (569 N⋅m) (auto)	D
1998.5–2000	5.9 L (359 cu in) Cummins ISB 24-valve diesel I6	230 hp (172 kW; 233 PS) (manual), 215 hp (160 kW; 218 PS) (auto)	450 lb⋅ft (610 N⋅m) (manual), 420 lb⋅ft (569 N⋅m) (auto)	6
2001–2002	5.9 L (359 cu in) Cummins ISB 24-valve diesel I6	235 hp (175 kW; 238 PS) (5-speed manual or automatic)	460 lb⋅ft (624 N⋅m) (5-speed manual or automatic)	6
2001–2002	5.9 L (359 cu in) Cummins ISB 24-valve diesel I6	245 hp (183 kW; 248 PS) (High Output)	505 lb⋅ft (685 N⋅m) (High Output)	C or 7

=== Special editions ===
- Limited Edition Indy and SS/T Package – The Dodge Ram Indy Official Truck was available in 1996. It included longitudinal stripes similar to those on the Dodge Viper along with an optional door sticker stating "Official Truck of the 80th Indianapolis 500". These trucks had a 5.9 L (360 cu in) engine with upgraded exhaust and 15 hp (11 kW) more power. These also included 17-inch (432 mm) wheels with Goodyear Eagle II 275/60R17 tires. 3212 were built. The SS/T (Super Sport Truck) version was available from 1997 until 1998 and included all the upgrades except the door sticker. The SS/T also had "SS/T" designed into the stripe on both the hood and tailgate. The Indy Trucks were available only in blue with white stripes. The SS/Ts were available in white/blue, red/silver, black/silver, and green/silver. All include a specialty sticker on the inner door stating, "Built with pride in the U.S.A." A real Indy 500 Official Truck will have the code AGJ, which is the INDY 500 SPECIAL EDITION GROUP.
- High Output – The Ram trucks started offering a diesel High Output package for 2001 models. 2001/2002 high-output engines were rated 10 horsepower higher than the standard engine.
- Off-Road Edition – The Dodge Ram 1500 SLT Off-Road "Edition" (package) was available in the latter portion of the second generation. It included 17-inch alloy wheels (standard were 16-inch), added 4×4 transfer case skid plate, 4.10:1 rear axle ratio, limited-slip rear differential, heated dual-power side mirrors, fog lamps, and frame-mounted front tow hooks.
- Dodge Ram VTS Concept – This concept from Dodge was meant to be a design study highly inspired by Viper GTS, with Viper-inspired bumpers, mirrors, 17-inch wheels, Blue Paint, dual white stripes and a Viper GTS sourced 415 bhp V10. The VTS was vital in the development of the Ram SRT-10 that was built from 2004 until 2006.

=== Gallery ===
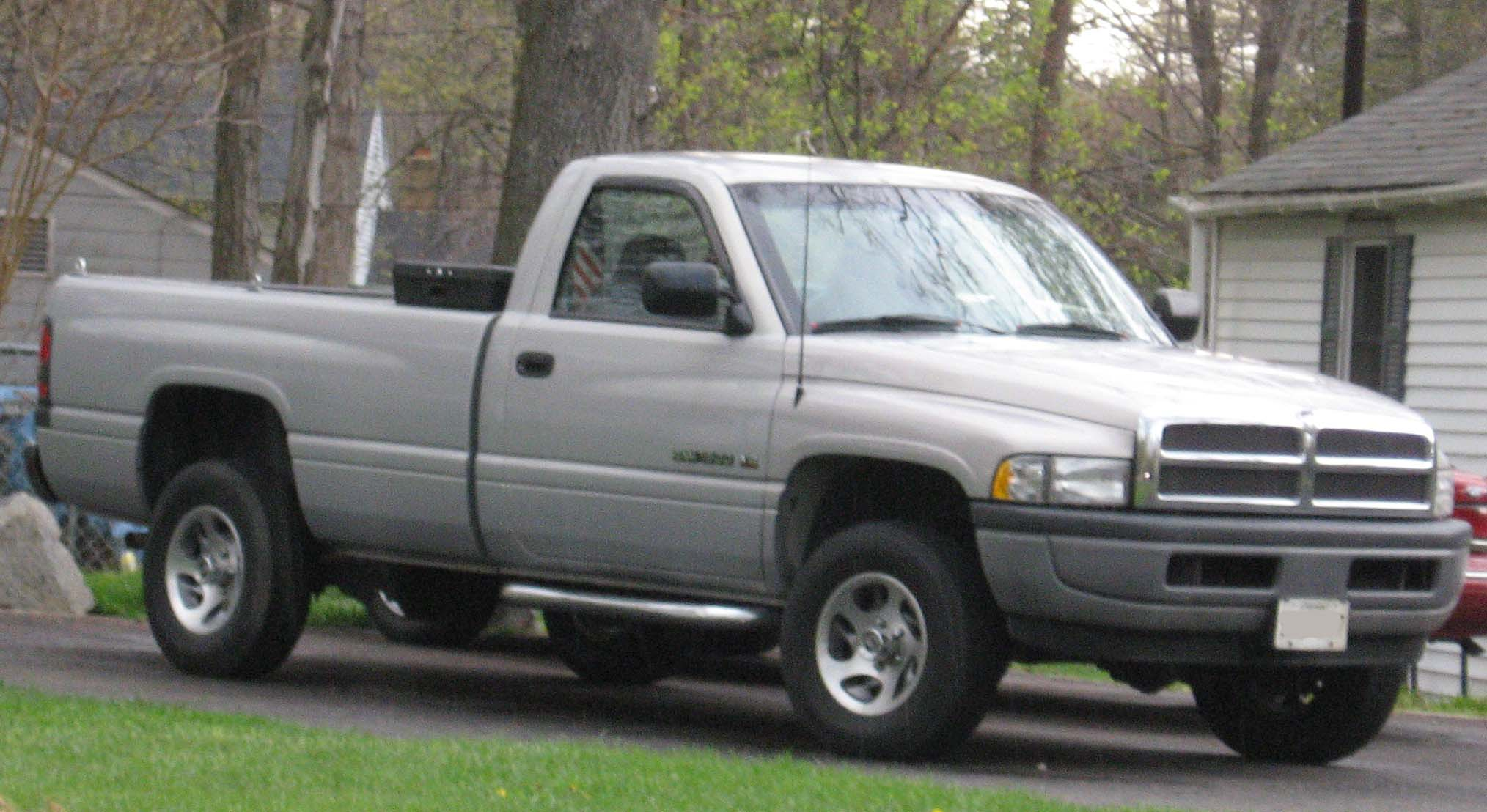
1994–1997 Dodge Ram 1500 Regular Cab

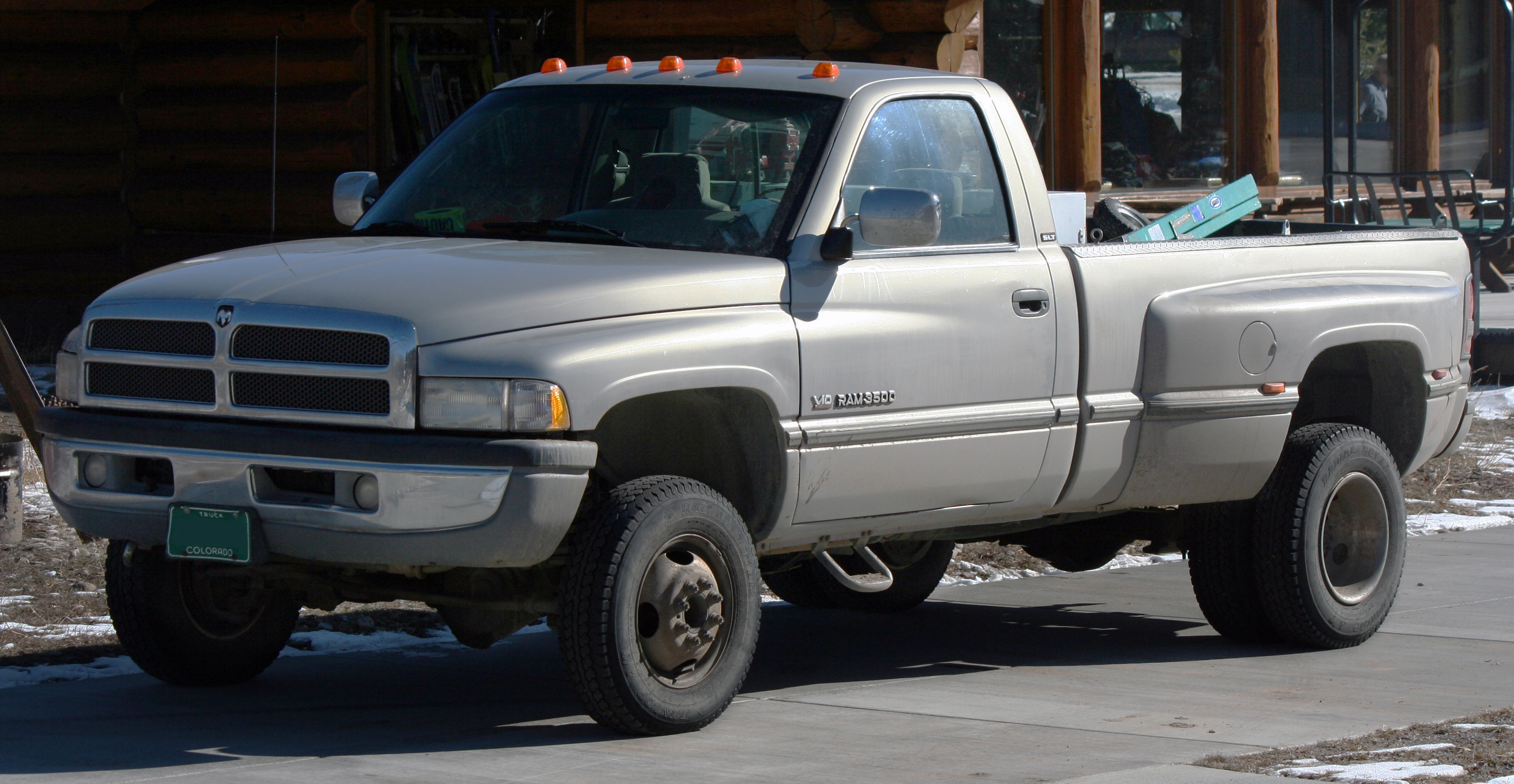
Dodge Ram 3500 dually with V10 engine

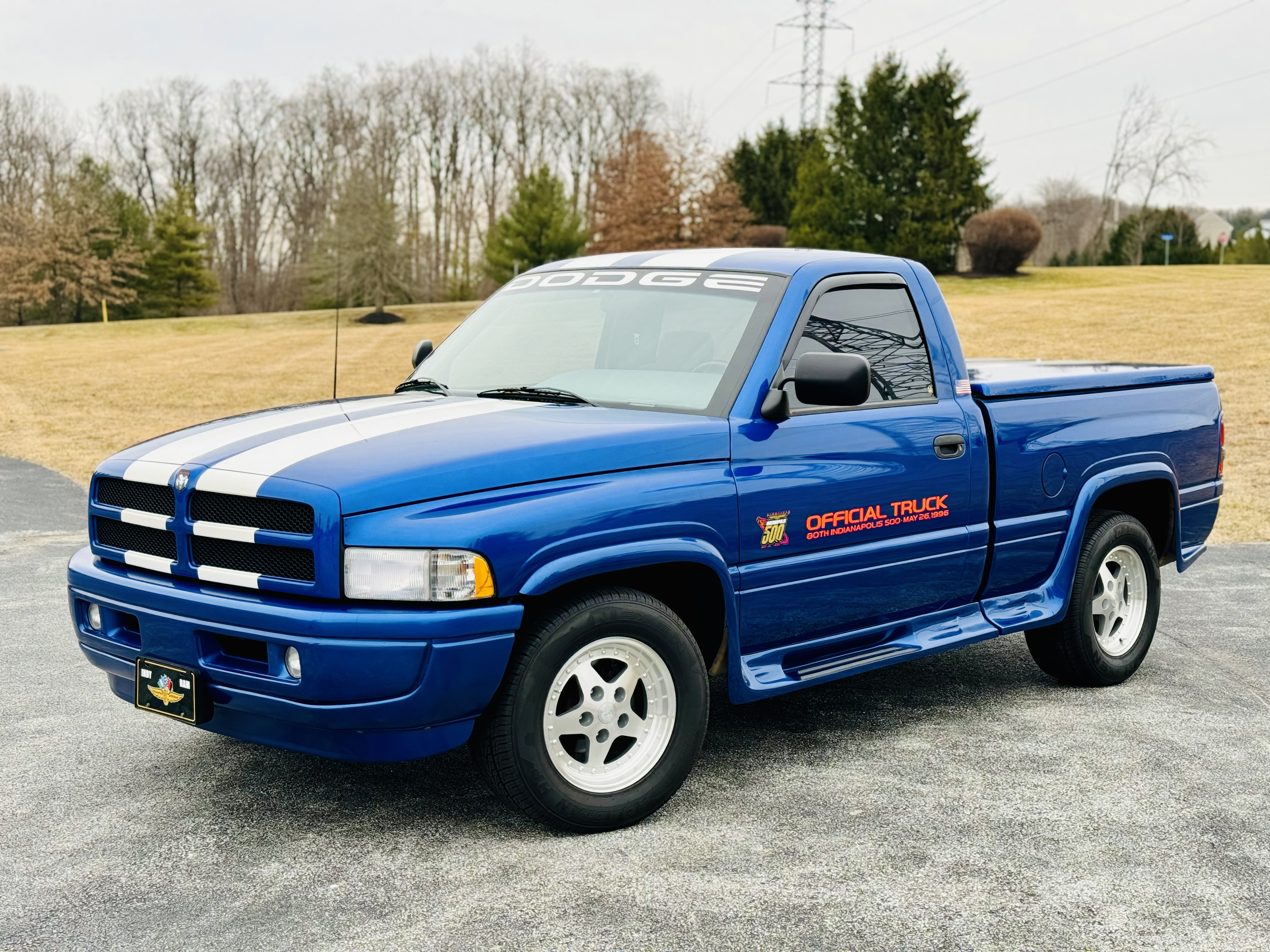
1996 Dodge Ram "Indy 500 Edition"

1996 Dodge Ram 1500 side view

Dodge Ram 1500 Club Cab rear view

2001 Dodge Ram Regency Package front driver's side

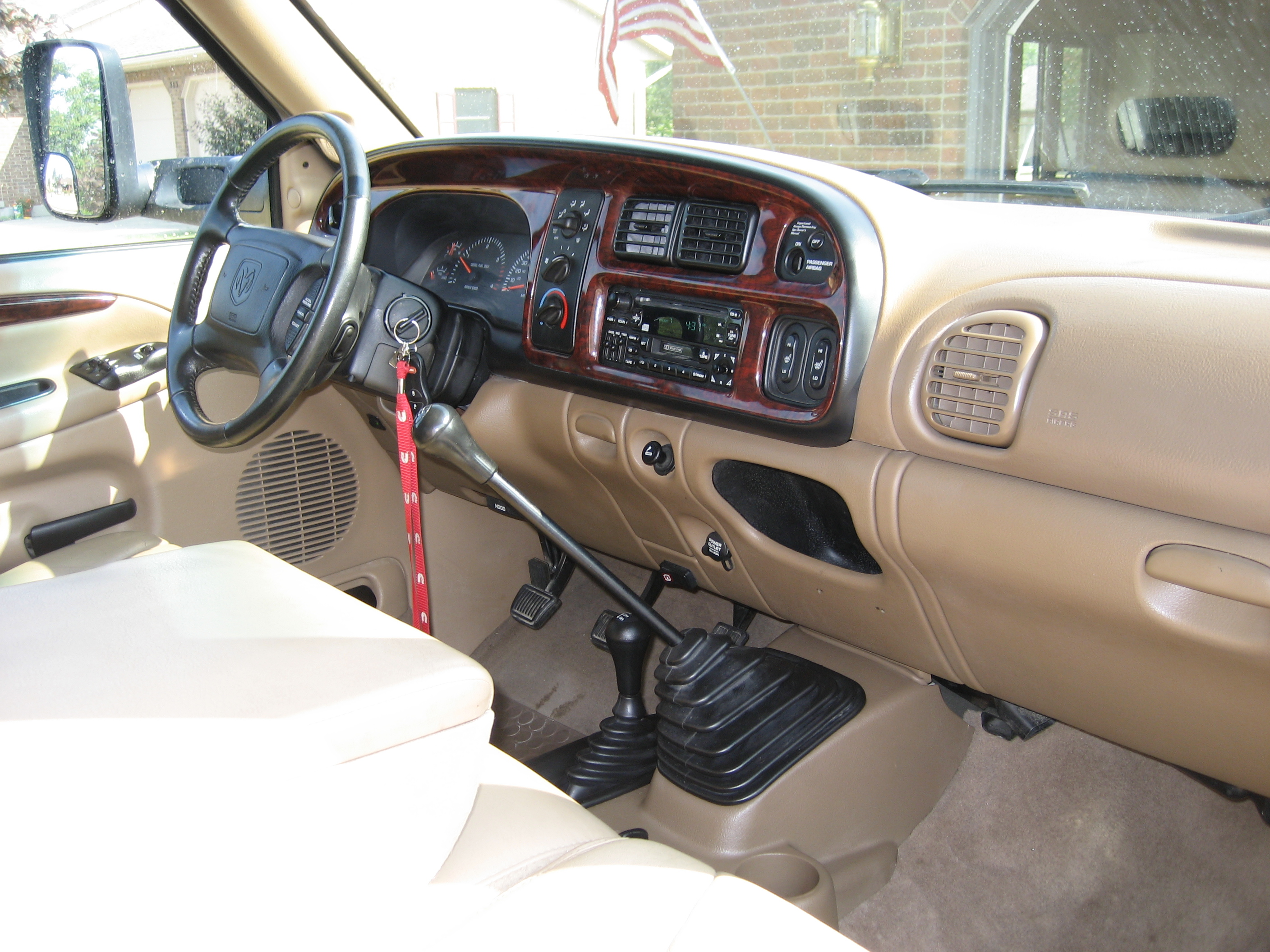
2002 Dodge Ram 2500 interior (first-row view)

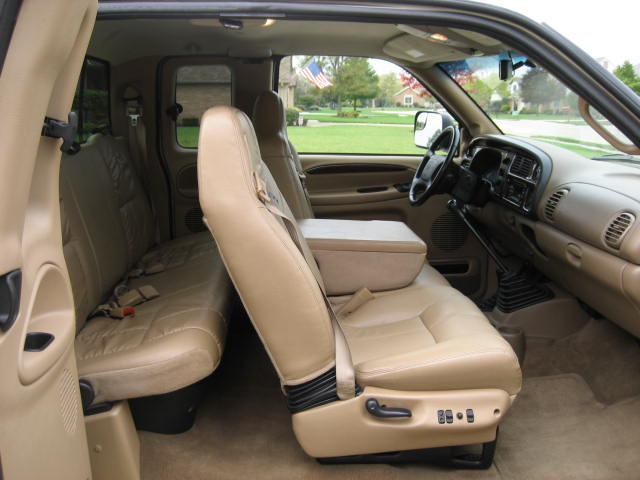
2002 Dodge Ram 2500 Quad Cab interior (passenger-side view)

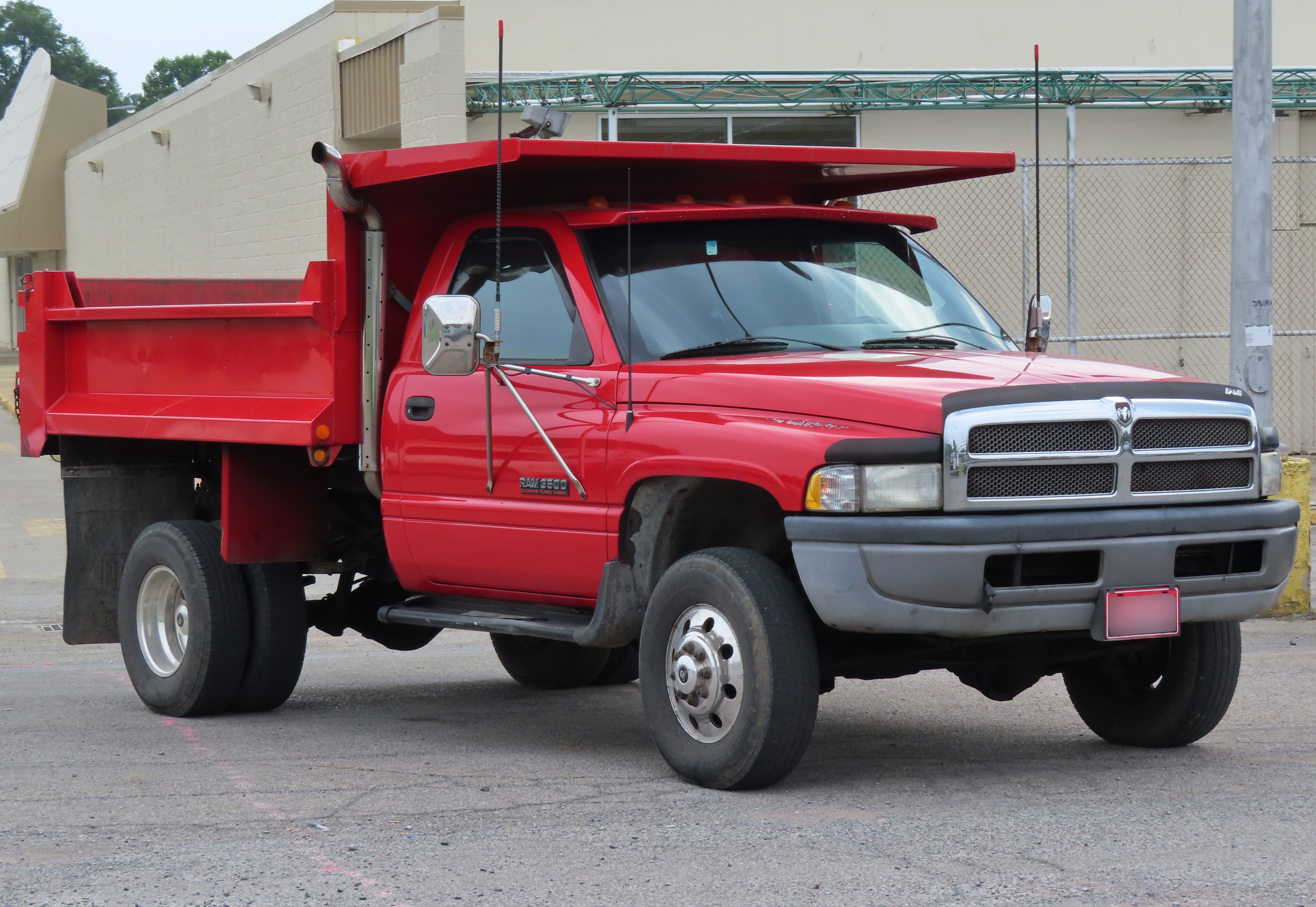
1995 Dodge Ram 3500 LT 4×4 chassis cab dually

== Third generation (2002; DR/DH/D1/DC/DM) ==
Third generation
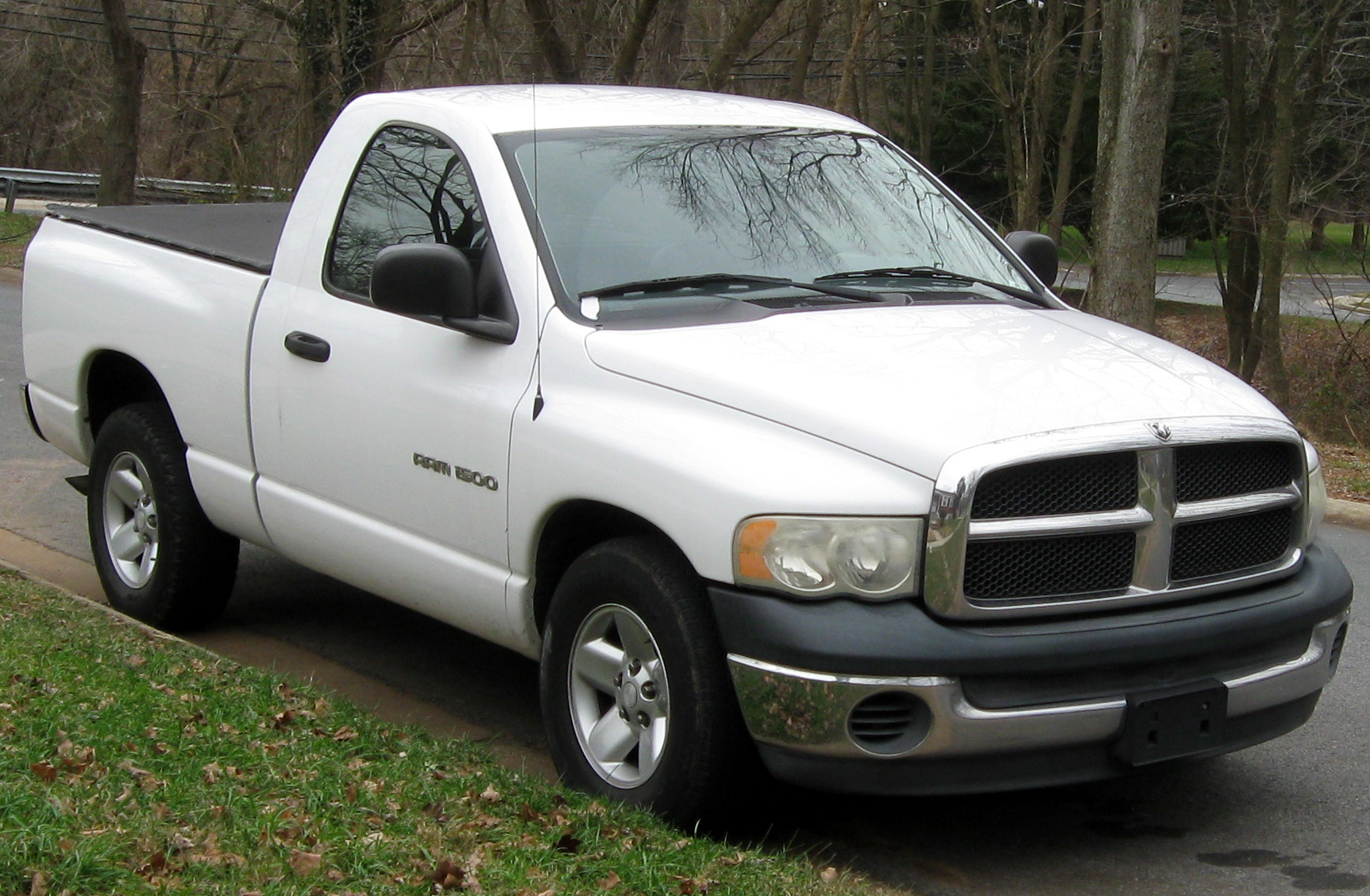
- 2002–2005 Dodge Ram 1500 Regular Cab

Overview
- Production: July 2001 – 2008 (1500); August 2002 – 2009 (2500 and 3500)
- Model years: 2002–2008 (1500); 2003–2009 (2500 and 3500 pickups); 2007–2010 (chassis cabs)
- Designer: Cliff Wilkins (1998)

Body and chassis
- Body style: 2-door regular cab 4-door Quad Cab; 4-door Mega Cab
- Related: Sterling Bullet

Powertrain
- Engine: Gasoline: 3.7 L (226 cu in) PowerTech V6; 4.7 L (287 cu in) PowerTech V8; 5.7 L (345 cu in) Hemi V8; 5.9 L (360 cu in) Magnum V8; 8.0 L (488 cu in) Magnum V10; 8.3 L (506 cu in) Viper V10; Diesel: 5.9 L (359 cu in) Cummins ISB turbo I6; 6.7 L (408 cu in) Cummins ISB turbo I6
- Transmission: 4-speed 42RLE automatic; 4-speed 45RFE automatic; 4-speed TorqueFlite 48RE automatic; 5-speed 545RFE automatic; 6-speed 68RFE automatic; 6-speed Aisin AS68RC automatic; 5-speed New Venture Gear NV4500 manual; 6-speed New Venture Gear NV5600 manual; 6-speed G56 manual; 6-speed Getrag 238 manual; 5-speed Tremec TR-4050 manual

Dimensions
- Wheelbase: 120.5–160.5 in (3,060–4,080 mm)
- Length: 207.7–295.1 in (5,280–7,500 mm)
- Width: 79.5 inches (2,020 mm)
- Height: 75.7–80.8 in (1,920–2,050 mm)

In development from 1996 (styling by Cliff Wilkins finalized in 1998), the third-generation Dodge Ram debuted on February 7, 2001, at the 2001 Chicago Auto Show. Production later began for the 2002 model year on 1500 models, and 2003 on 2500 and 3500 models. This major update included an all-new frame, suspension, powertrains, interiors, and sheet metal. The crew cab models for this generation were actually Quad Cab trucks that had conventional-opening rear doors. The four-wheel-drive light trucks (1500 series) remove their beam axles in favor of an independent front suspension, but the 2500 and 3500 series retained the live axles for maximum longevity and durability; rear-wheel-drive 2500 and 3500 trucks had class-exclusive rack-and-pinion steering for their independent front suspension (the 1500 also received rack-and-pinion steering for the first time). This body style drew heavily from the previous generation.

The redesigned trucks bolstered sales, with 400,000 sold during 2001–2002 and nearly 450,000 sold during 2002–2003, a new high point for the Ram name. At the same time, both Ford and GM trucks were increasing in sales from a 2001 peak of over 850,000 to the 900,000 range. However, with 400,543 Rams sold that year, the total did not keep up with the eleventh-generation F-150 in 2004.

=== 2006 refresh ===
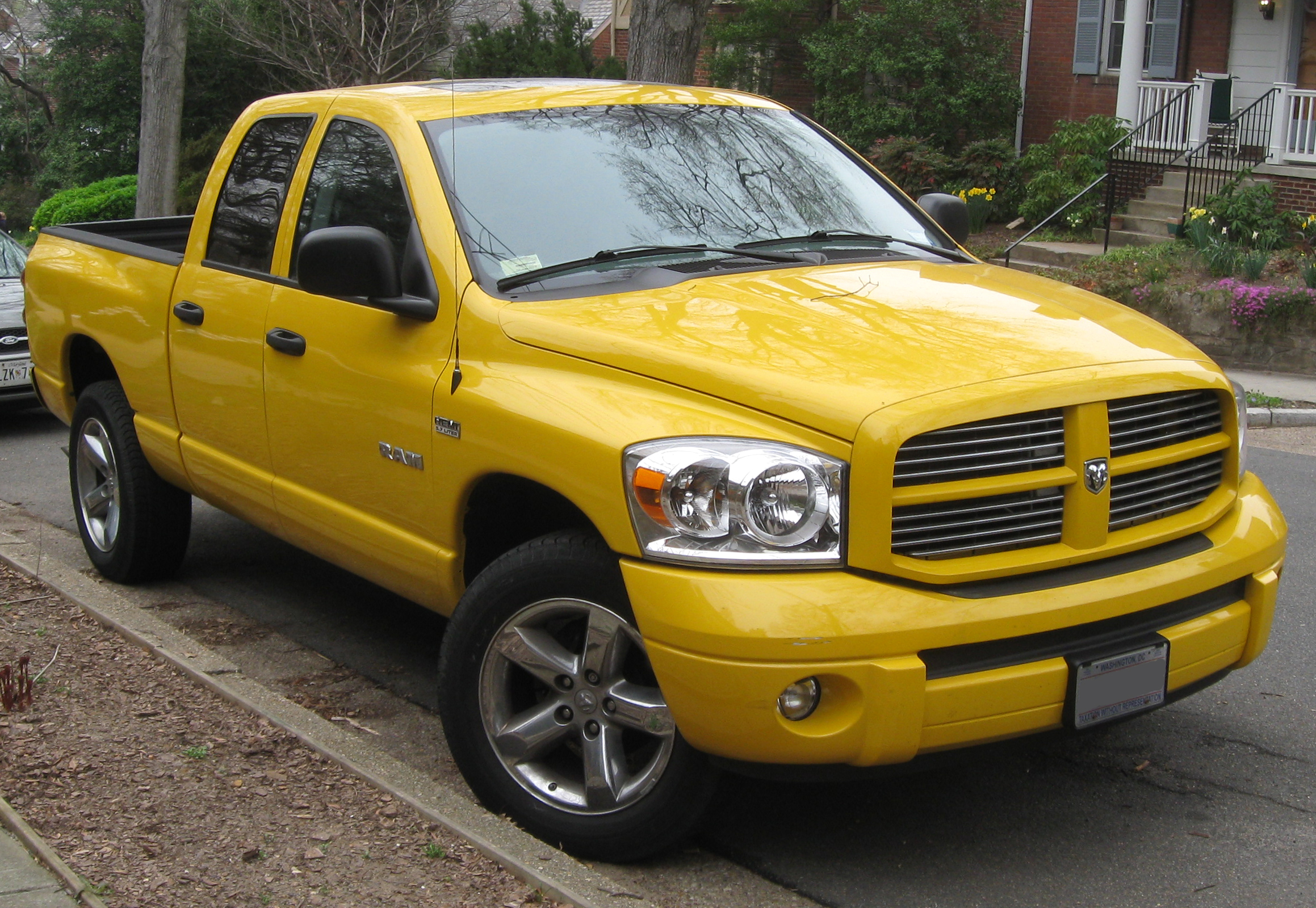
2008 Dodge Ram 1500 Quad Cab

The entire lineup was updated for the 2006 model year. One notable addition was the "Mega Cab," featuring a 6.25-foot (2 m) cargo box and 22 inches (559 mm) of extra cab space, allowing seating for six with rear recliners. A full-screen-mapping in-dash navigation system became an option, and the front fascia was modernized.

For 2006, the steering wheel design was changed to the same as seen in the Dodge Dakota and Dodge Durango. The Bluetooth Uconnect radio was now available as an option, and a facelift was given to all Ram models. SIRIUS Satellite Radio was available, as well as a rear-seat DVD entertainment system with wireless headphones. The high-performance SRT-10 was discontinued after the 2006 model year.

For 2007, the taillights were slightly revised. For 2008, the RAM 1500 emblems on the front doors were replaced with RAM emblems.

=== Chassis Cab ===
For 2007, a 3500 Chassis Cab model was introduced with industry-standard rear frame width and wiring to accommodate outfitters. Three wheelbases were offered: 144" and 168" on regular cabs and 164" on Quad Cabs. In addition to the 5.7 L (345 cu in) V8, a Cummins 6.7 L (408 cu in) diesel rated at 350 hp (261 kW) and 650 lb⋅ft (881 N⋅m) was available. Automatic transmissions used were the 545RFE with the 5.7 L (345 cu in) and the AS68RC with the 6.7 L (408 cu in). The G56 transmission was the only manual transmission offered. Regardless of drivetrain, the Chassis Cab models featured a solid coil-sprung front axle, recirculating ball steering, and the same frame.

For 2008, Dodge introduced two more Chassis Cab models, the all-new 4500 and 5500 (to compete with Ford's F-450/F-550). These were Class 4 and Class 5 trucks with a gross weight rating of 16,500 lb (7,484 kg) and 19,500 lb (8,845 kg), respectively. Both trucks came equipped with the same version of the Cummins 6.7 L (408 cu in) diesel as the 3500 chassis-cab model. Sterling, who worked with Dodge in development, had their own version, called the Sterling Bullet with a unique grille. Sterling is a division of Freightliner Trucks which, like Dodge, was owned by the former DaimlerChrysler. Sterling Trucks was licensed to sell Dodge Ram 4500 series trucks as the Sterling Bullet. When the Sterling brand was phased out by Chrysler Corporation, the Bullet was discontinued.

=== Engines ===
Model	Model years	Engine	Power	Torque
1500	2002–2008	3.7 L (226 cu in) PowerTech V6	215 hp (160 kW)	235 lb⋅ft (319 N⋅m)
1500	2002–2007	4.7 L (287 cu in) PowerTech V8	235 hp (175 kW)	295 lb⋅ft (400 N⋅m)
1500	2008	4.7 L (287 cu in) PowerTech V8	310 hp (231 kW)	330 lb⋅ft (447 N⋅m)
1500	2002–2003	5.9 L (360 cu in) Magnum V8	245 hp (183 kW)	335 lb⋅ft (454 N⋅m)
1500	2003–2008	5.7 L (345 cu in) Hemi V8	345 hp (257 kW)	375 lb⋅ft (508 N⋅m)
2500/3500	2003–2008	5.7 L (345 cu in) Hemi V8	345 hp (257 kW)	375 lb⋅ft (508 N⋅m)
2500/3500	2009	5.7 L (345 cu in) Hemi V8 (2500 only)	390 hp (291 kW)	410 lb⋅ft (556 N⋅m)
2500/3500	2003 SO "6" Vin Designation	5.9 L (359 cu in) Cummins diesel I6	250 hp (186 kW)	460 lb⋅ft (624 N⋅m)
2500/3500	2003 SO California Emissions	5.9 L (359 cu in) Cummins diesel I6	235 hp (175 kW)	460 lb⋅ft (624 N⋅m)
2500/3500	2003–2004 HO "C" Vin Designation	5.9 L (359 cu in) Cummins diesel I6	305 hp (227 kW)	555 lb⋅ft (752 N⋅m)
2500/3500	2004.5–2007 HO	5.9 L (359 cu in) Cummins diesel I6	325 hp (242 kW)	610 lb⋅ft (827 N⋅m)
2500/3500	2007–2009	6.7 L (408 cu in) Cummins diesel I6	350 hp (261 kW)	650 lb⋅ft (881 N⋅m)
2500/3500	2003	8.0 L (488 cu in) Magnum V10	310 hp (231 kW)	450 lb⋅ft (610 N⋅m)
Chassis Cab	2007–2009	5.7 L (345 cu in) Hemi V8 (3500 only)	345 hp (257 kW)	375 lb⋅ft (508 N⋅m)
Chassis Cab	2009	5.7 L (345 cu in) Hemi V8 (3500 only)	388 hp (289 kW)	404 lb⋅ft (548 N⋅m)
Chassis Cab	2007–2010	6.7 L (408 cu in) Cummins diesel I6	305 hp (227 kW)	610 lb⋅ft (827 N⋅m)
SRT-10	2004–2006	8.3 L (505 cu in) Viper V10	510 hp (380 kW)	535 lb⋅ft (725 N⋅m)

Models built after January 1, 2007, offered a new 6.7 L Cummins turbo diesel introduced as an option in 2500/3500 models replacing the 5.9 L. It produces 350 hp (261 kW) and 650 lb⋅ft (881 N⋅m). Unlike the 5.9 L, which was backed by the 4-speed 48RE transmission, the 6.7 L was equipped with the new 6-speed 68RFE transmission.

2005 was the last year for the first version of the 5.7 L (345 cu in) Hemi V8. 2006 half-ton models offered the Multi-Displacement System Hemi V8 engine that also became available in Chrysler and Dodge sedans. This engine featured the same performance but had a cylinder-deactivating feature enabled under light loads to increase fuel economy by 3 MPG city and 4 MPG highway. This new Hemi still delivered 345 hp (257 kW) and 375 lb⋅ft (508 N⋅m).

=== Axles ===
For the 2003 model year, AAM axles replaced the Dana Corp axles. In the front, all 2500 and 3500 trucks were 9.25-inch with 33 spline axles. The rear options for the 2500 and 3500 were the AAM Corporate 10.5" and 11.5". Rear-axle shafts are 30 spline. The rear 11.5" has a gear ratio "carrier split" at 3.73 and numerically higher, but the General Motors AAM axles used a different carrier spacing preventing the installation of a Chrysler carrier into some GM axles, but the GM carrier can be installed in the Chrysler axle if a ring gear spacer is installed. Strength is similar to their earlier Dana 70 and 80 counterparts. Direct comparisons are difficult as the axles are made with completely different metallurgy.

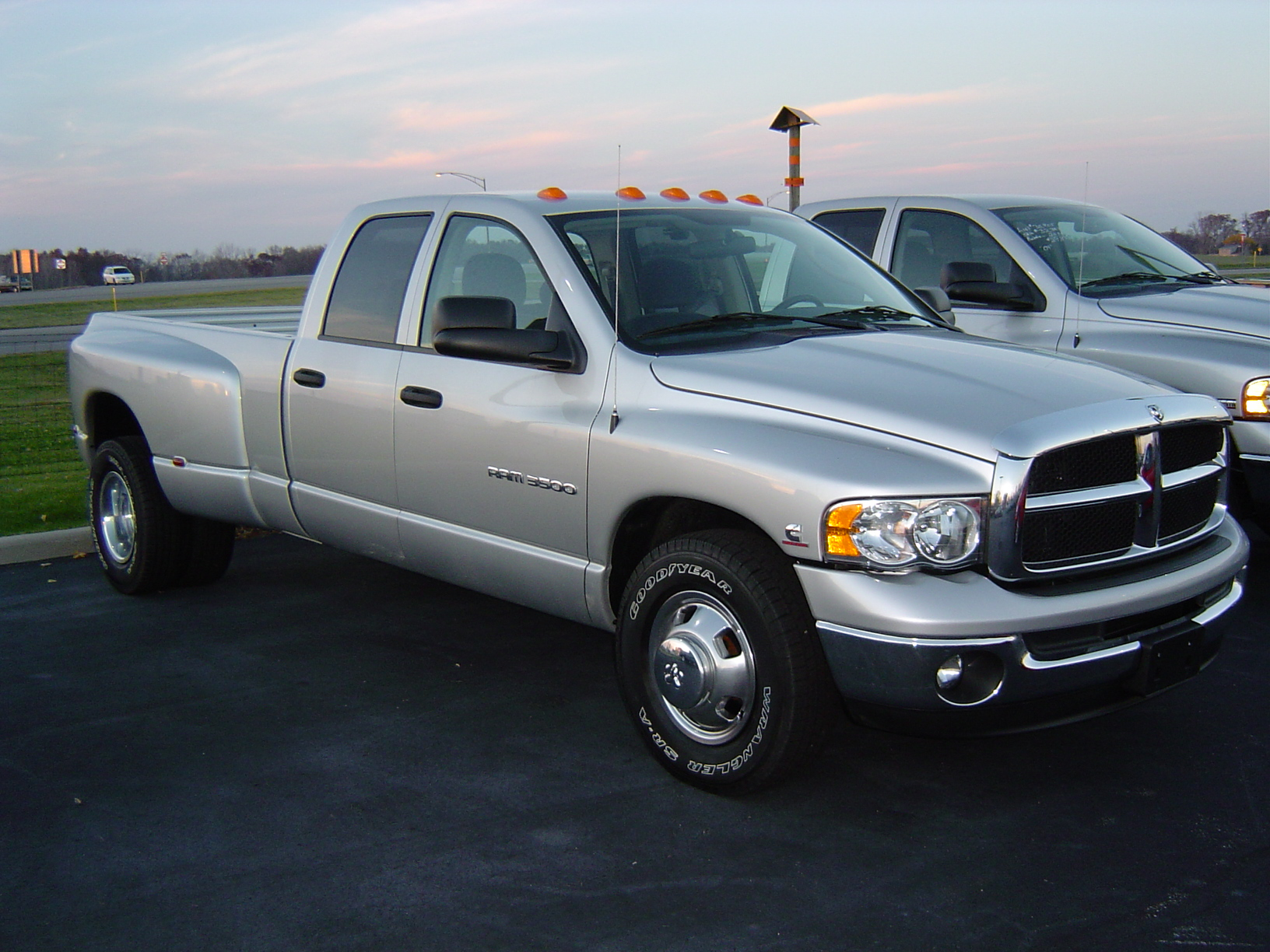
2003 Dodge Ram 3500 dually

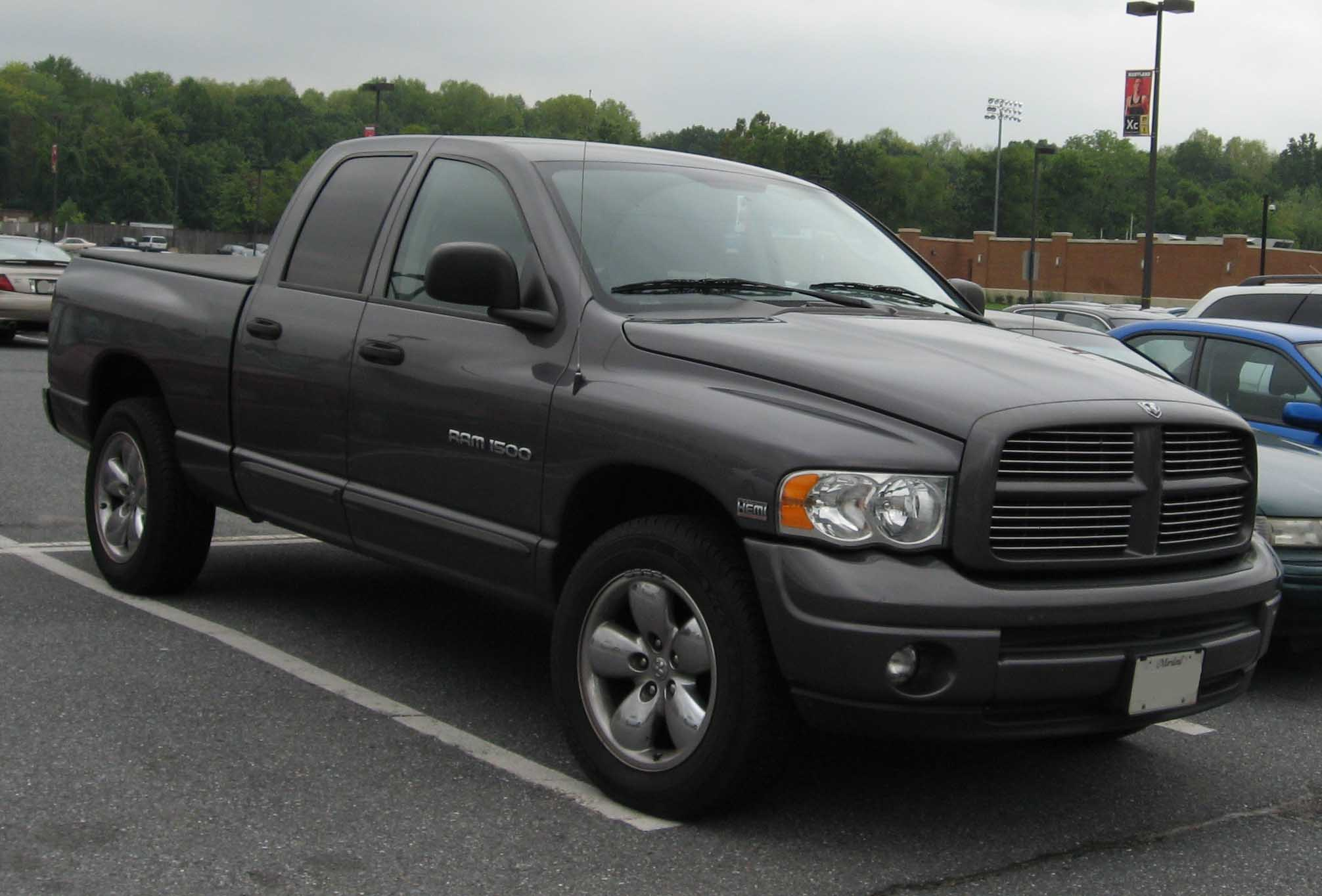
2005 Dodge Ram 1500 Quad Cab

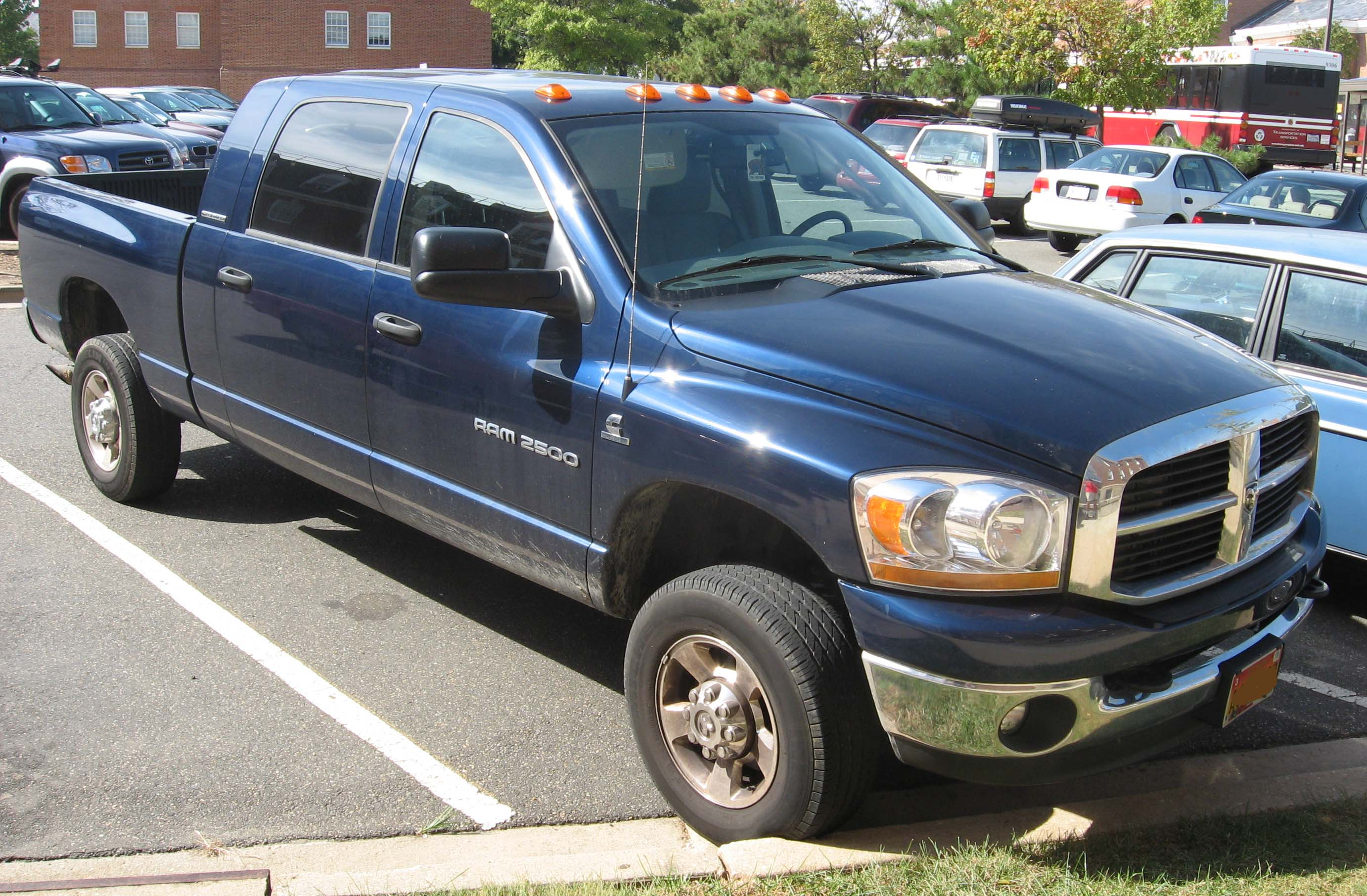
2006 Dodge Ram 2500 Mega Cab

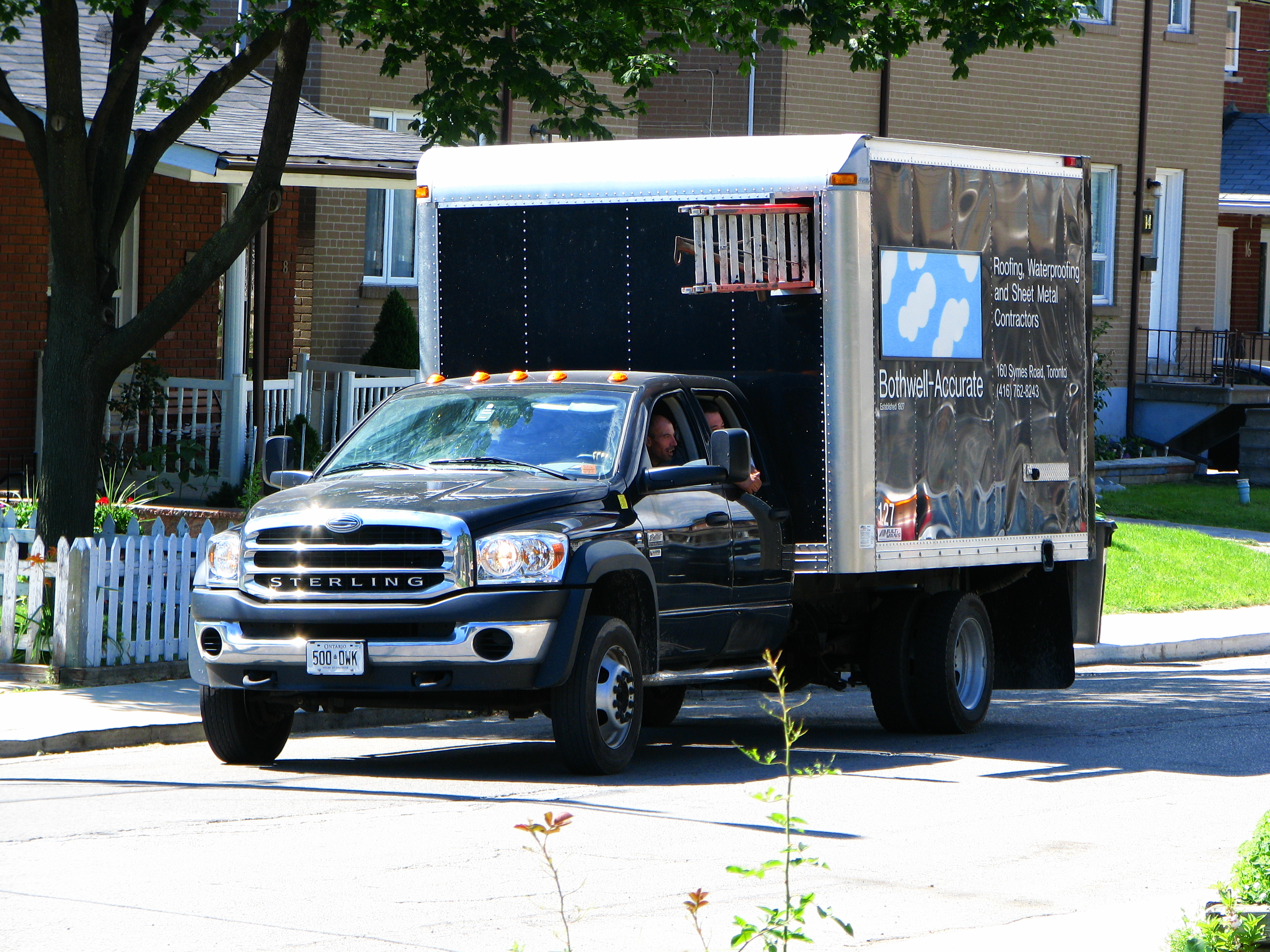
Sterling Bullet, a rebadged version of the Ram 4500/5500 sold by Sterling Trucks, with the 6.7 L (410 cu in) Cummins Diesel I6

=== Special editions ===
- Hemi Sport – The Hemi Sport Edition was the Quad Cab version of the Rumble Bee, and was introduced in 2004. It was available in black, red, or silver, and with either two-wheel drive or four-wheel drive. It was equipped similarly to the Rumble Bee, but without the number plaque. The Hemi Sport was discontinued after 2006.
- Dodge Ram SRT-10 – This is a regular or quad-cab body with the Dodge Viper's 8.3L V10 engine, Pirelli tires on 22" rims, lowered suspension, bucket seats, body modifications, and a spoiler. The 2004 version was available only in a regular cab with a 6-speed manual transmission and a Hurst shifter. For 2005, Dodge released a Quad Cab version of the Viper V10–powered truck with a modified 48RE four-speed automatic transmission from the Ram with the Cummins turbodiesel engine. In 2004, the truck held the Guinness World Record for "World's Fastest Production Pickup Truck" with a speed of 154.587 mph (247.3 km/h). This record stood until overtaken by the Australian HSV Maloo R8, a sport utility coupe, in May 2006. SRT-10 production ended on June 30, 2006.
- Power Wagon – This model, introduced for 2005, is an off-road–focused version of the Ram. The name is drawn from Dodge's line of four-wheel-drive trucks made from the early 1940s through the 1980s. It comes with the 5.7 L (345 cu in) Hemi engine, electronic locking differentials, electronic disconnecting front sway bar, 285/70R17 off-road tires mounted on power wagon specific 17" wheels with dual safety beads, factory lift springs with power wagon specific spring rates, fender flares, full underbody skid plates, "Power Wagon" nameplates instead of the standard Ram badging, and a 12,000-pound winch. This truck was built on the 2500 platform and was available with the regular cab long bed or quad cab short bed.

2005 Dodge Ram Rumble Bee

- Rumble Bee – The Rumble Bee package is a limited sport-truck version of the Ram. It was available only on regular-cab/short-box pickups; however, some other versions of the Ram were modified to look like Rumble Bees. It includes lower body cladding, 20" wheels, a hood scoop, and an SLT interior specially trimmed with yellow dashboard and door panel inserts and a serialized number plate. On the rear of the box is a stripe with a "Rumble Bee" emblem, similar to that of the Super Bee. All Rumble Bees are either black with "solar yellow" trim or yellow with black trim. 4,858 were produced in 2004, and 5,174 in 2005.
- Hemi GTX – The Hemi GTX package is a limited sport-truck version of the Ram. Introduced in 2004 and only made in 2004 and 2005, these were customized by LA West of Indiana as ordered from dealers, adding an additional $8,300.50 in the sticker price. It was available on regular-cab/short-box and quad-cab/short-box pickups and include a custom overall paint from Mopar's Impact colors from the 1970s (this includes Hemi Orange, Plum Crazy Purple, Sublime Green, and Banana Yellow). 20" American Racing Motto chrome wheels, a new cowl "blacked-out" hood, and a specially trimmed leather 2-tone interior including a serialized number plate on the driver's-side doorjamb were offered. On the sides is a "hockey-stick" stripe with "HEMI GTX" that extended from the hood to the rear of the box. The airbox was also painted to match the body color, and a color-matched steering wheel was added as well. There were only 433 produced in 2004 and roughly the same number in 2005. A certificate of authenticity was given to all original owners.

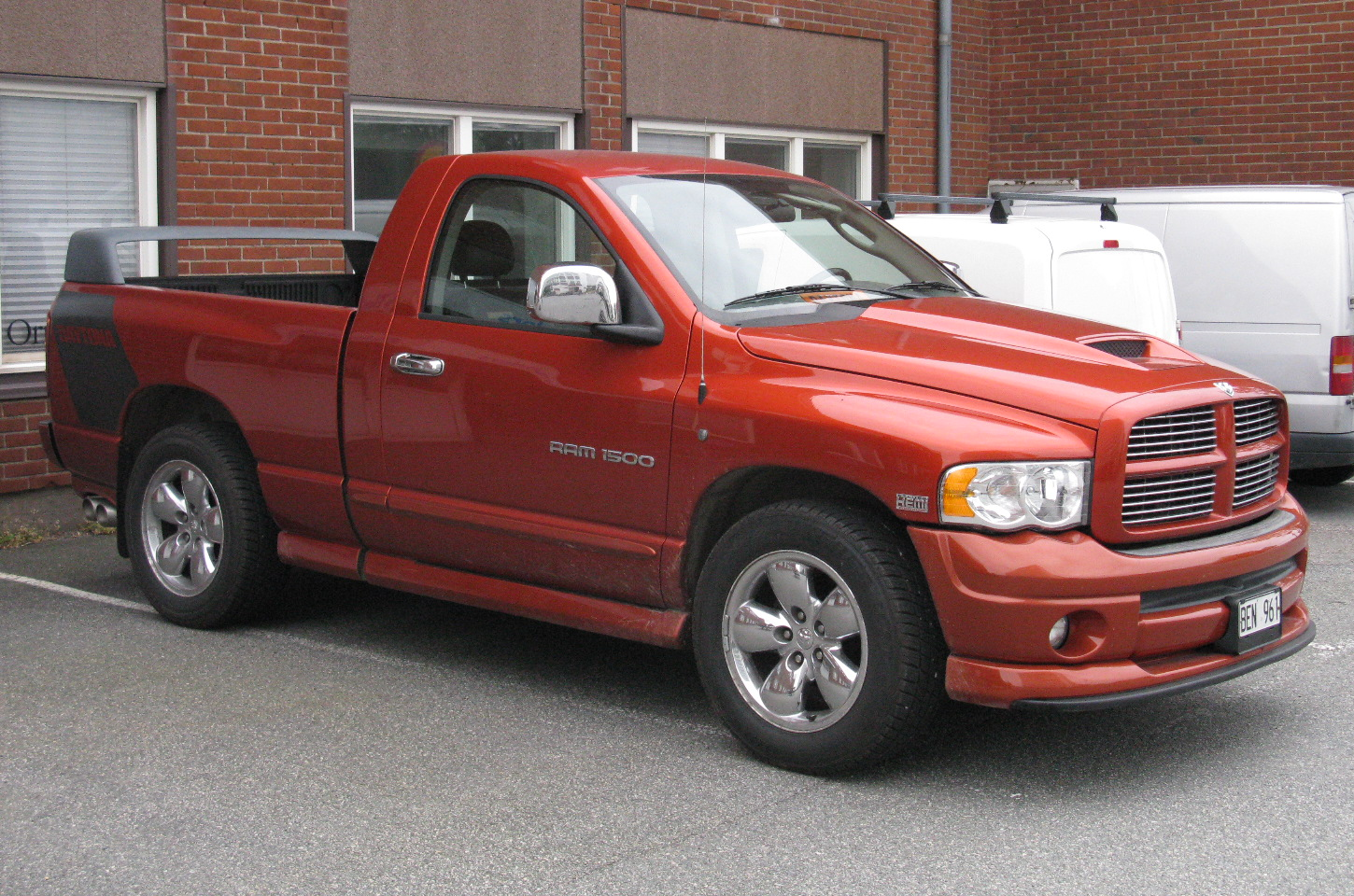
Dodge Ram Daytona

- Daytona – Introduced for 2005, the Ram Daytona was a new sport-truck edition of the Ram. It was available as a 5.7L Hemi V8 in Regular Cab or Quad Cab styles and featured lower-body cladding, 20" chrome wheels, SRT-10 hood, Borla dual exhaust, serialized number plate, and a tall rear spoiler reminiscent of the 1969 Dodge Charger Daytona. The Daytonas had a black body stripe to match the rear spoiler and came in silver or "Go Mango" paint (a metallic orange color reminiscent of the Dodge's "high impact" colors from the 1960s and 1970s) with matching interior trim. The Dodge Ram Daytona had a 3.92 ratio rear end, the same rear end as the Dodge Ram Rumble Bee. Several exterior items were unique to the Daytona package (such as the gas door and dual side-exit exhaust tips) which made it different from other equipment packages. It was equipped with 20-inch (510 mm) chrome wheels and performance tires. Replacing the standard hood is one with a non-functional hood scoop. The most noticeable feature is the large spoiler which is attached at the rear of the cargo box. The 11-inch (280 mm) spoiler lined up with the flat black stripe that ran along the back of the bed side with the word 'Daytona' written in the middle. This spoiler is reminiscent of the 1969 Dodge Charger Daytona.
- Contractor's Special hybrid – Dodge announced a hybrid version of the Ram, dubbed the Contractor's Special, in 2003. However, the schedule for delivery slipped as Dodge backed away from the vehicle. The hybrid Ram was available only for fleet purchasers (if at all) and did not enter mass production. It offered an AC electrical outlet panel for running an entire job site worth of power tools, but the through-the-road method of balancing the gas engine and electric motor reportedly did not work as desired. Dodge has announced that it would use a hybrid transmission developed jointly with General Motors and BMW.
- NightRunner – 400 of these were assembled from January 2006 to December 2006 (200 regular cab and 200 quad cab). The Limited Edition NightRunner trim includes Brilliant Black Paint, 22" (510 mm) black chrome wheels, black chrome grille, the 8.3L Viper engine, dark shaded headlamps, NightRunner graphics on the sides of the rear bed, Piano black dash, and a numbered plate below the climate controls.

== Fourth generation (2009; DS) ==
Fourth generation
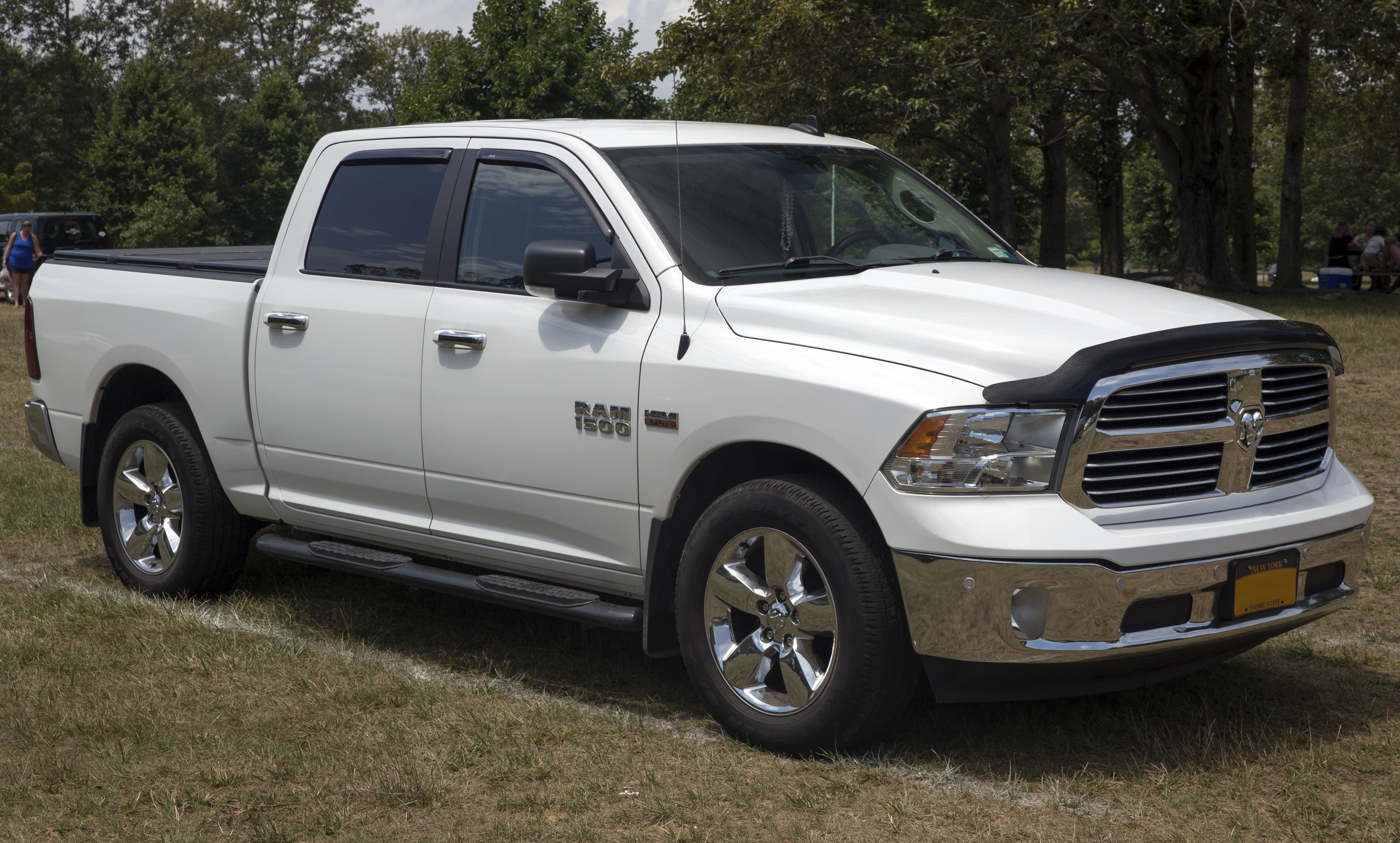
- 2016 Ram 1500 SLT Crew Cab

Overview
- Production: September 2008–2024
- Model years: 2009–2024
- Assembly: United States: Warren, Michigan (Warren Truck Assembly, 1500); United States: Fenton, Missouri (Saint Louis Assembly, 1500; 2008–2009); Mexico: Saltillo (Saltillo Truck Assembly)

Body and chassis
- Body style: 2-door regular cab; 4-door extended cab ("Quad Cab"; 1500); 4-door crew cab; 4-door extended crew cab ("Mega Cab"; Heavy Duty)

The fourth-generation Dodge Ram 1500 was introduced at the 2008 North American International Auto Show in Detroit, Michigan, for the 2009 model year. The redesigned 2500 and 3500 Heavy Duty pickups followed for 2010, while 3500, 4500 and 5500 chassis-cab models followed for 2011. The Ram Trucks brand was separated from Dodge for the 2011 model year.

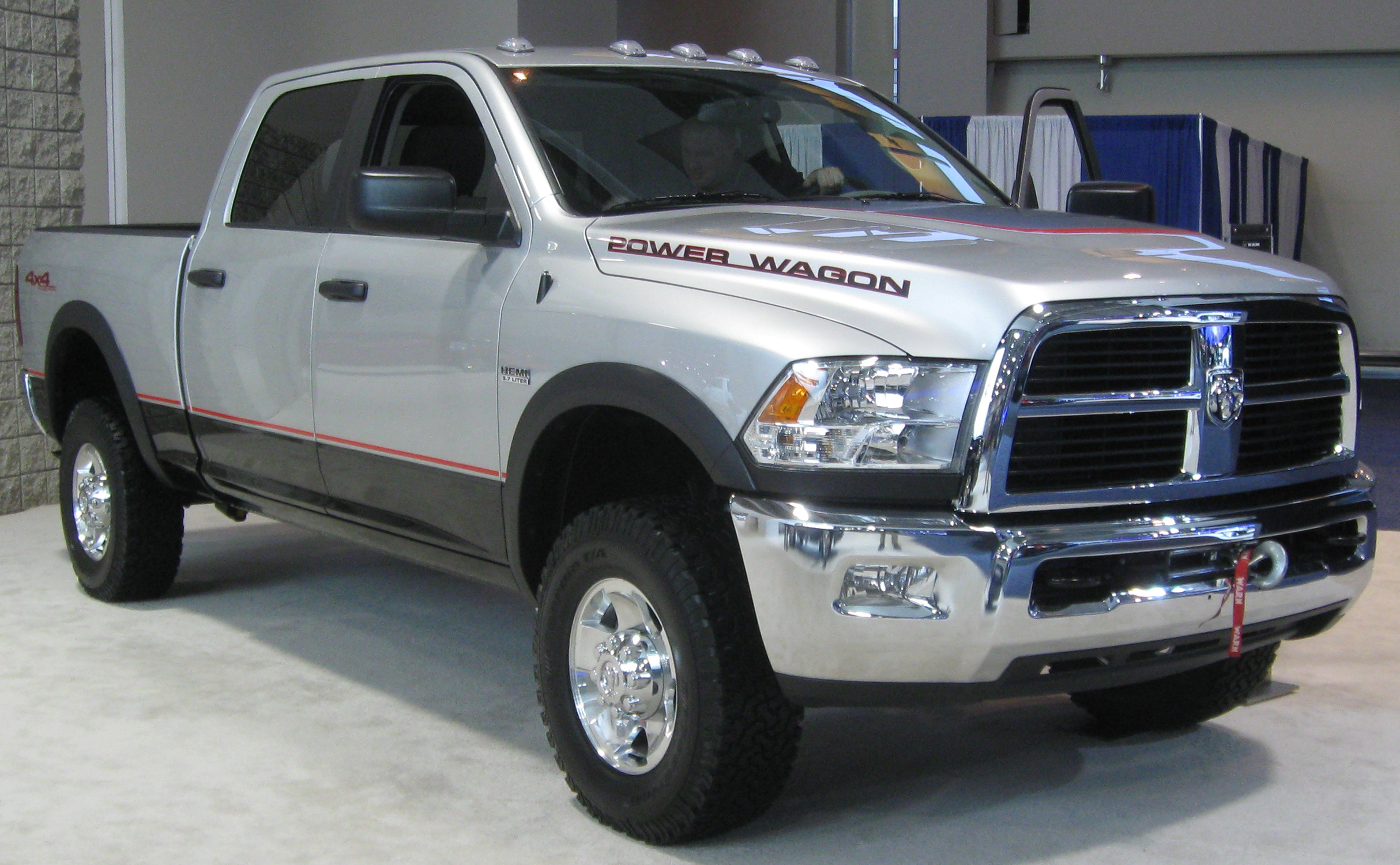
2011 Ram 2500 Power Wagon

Changes to the 1500 included a new Crew Cab body style, the optional RamBox cargo-management system and a five-link, coil-spring rear suspension replacing the previous leaf springs.

For 2013, the Ram 1500 received a revised front fascia and interior, a new 3.6-liter Pentastar V6, an available eight-speed automatic transmission, electric power steering and an optional four-corner air suspension. A 3.0-liter EcoDiesel turbocharged V6 was added for 2014.

For 2019, the fourth-generation 1500 remained in production alongside the new fifth-generation 1500 and was renamed the Ram 1500 Classic. The Classic retained Regular, Quad and Crew Cab configurations and was marketed primarily as a lower-priced and commercial-oriented model. The 2500 and 3500 were redesigned for the same model year as the fifth-generation Ram Heavy Duty.

The Ram 1500 Classic remained in production through the 2024 model year.

== Fifth generation (2019; DT) ==
Fifth generation
- 2019 Ram 1500 Laramie

Overview
- Production: January 2018 – present
- Model years: 2019–present
- Assembly: United States: Sterling Heights, Michigan (Sterling Heights Assembly Plant, 1500); Mexico: Saltillo (Saltillo Truck Assembly, Heavy Duty)

Body and chassis
- Body style: 4-door Quad Cab; 4-door crew cab
- Related: Wagoneer/Grand Wagoneer

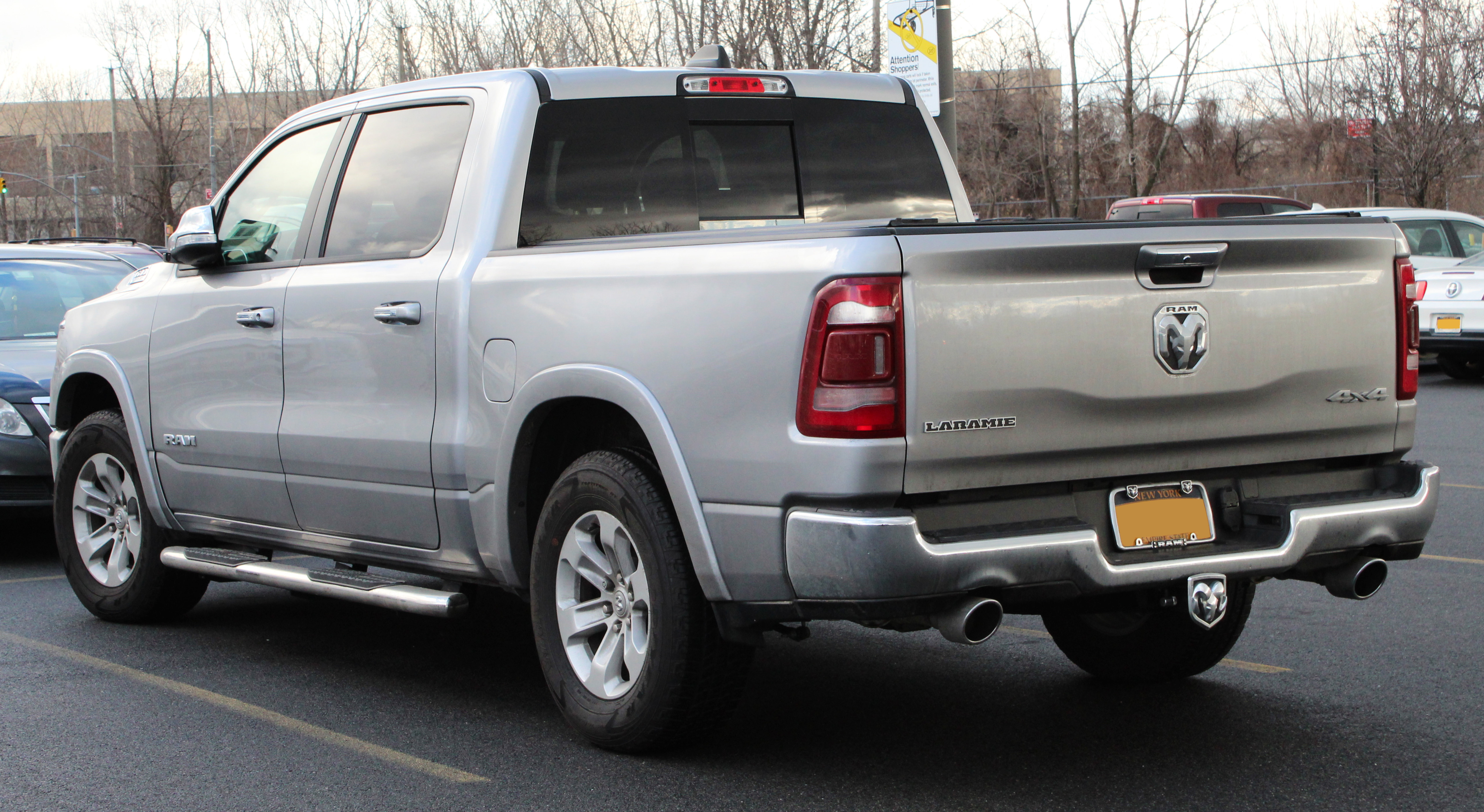
2019 Ram 1500 Laramie Crew Cab (rear)

The fifth-generation Ram made its debut at the 2018 North American International Auto Show in Detroit, Michigan, on January 15, 2018, while its HD version made its debut at the next year's show on January 14, 2019.

2019 Ram 1500 sales began the first quarter of 2018 as an early 2019 model year vehicle. The 2019 Ram 1500 pickup truck offered just seven trim levels, compared to the previous 11 different trim levels.

Ram added eTorque to the 2019 Ram 1500 as an option. eTorque combined a belt-drive generator with a battery pack to provide short-term torque and energy regeneration to increase torque output by up to 130 pound-feet (176 N⋅m) to the 5.7-liter Hemi. Also introduced in 2019 was the new Uconnect platform sporting a 12-inch touchscreen display, the largest in its class.

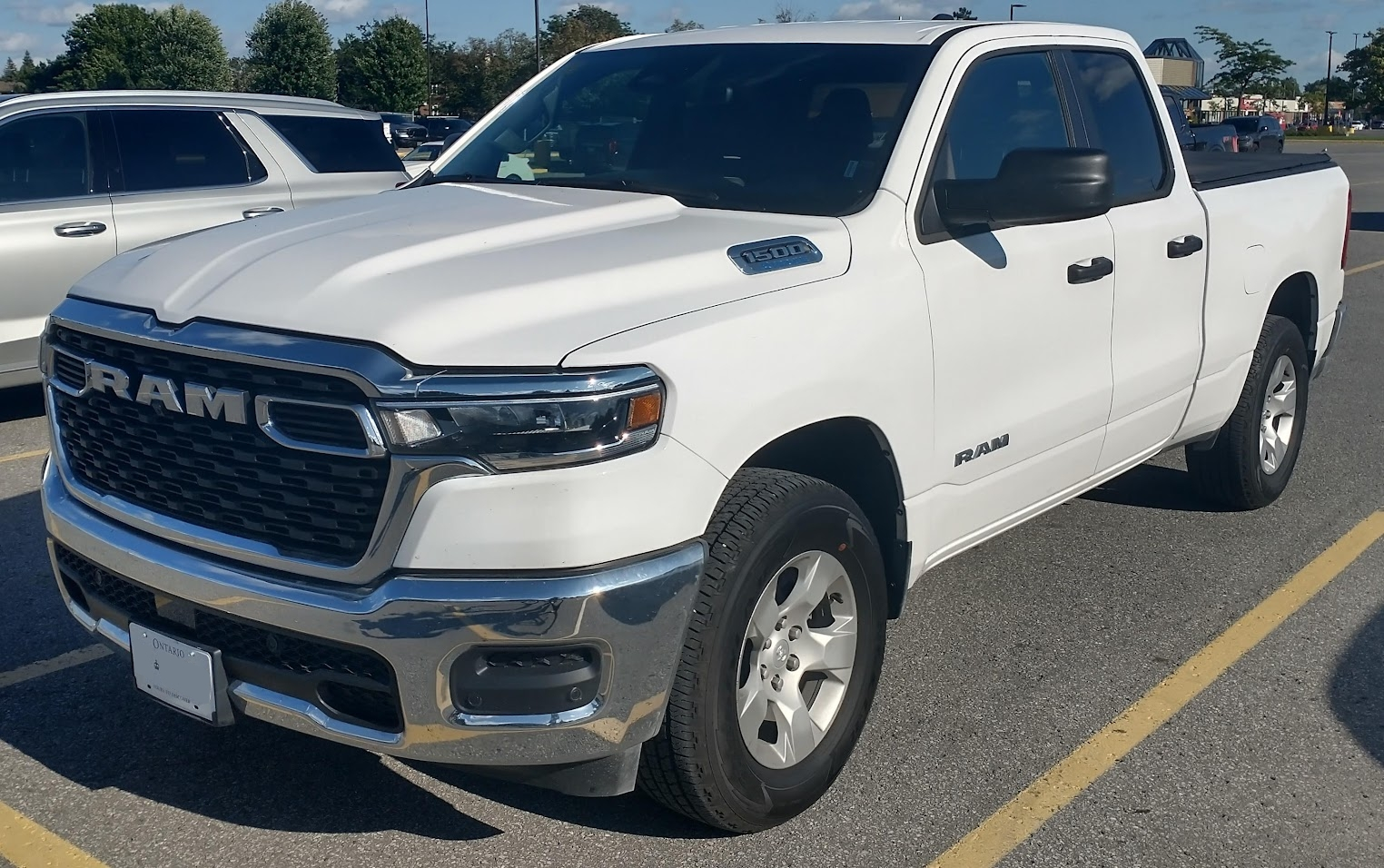
Updated 5th generation 1500 Ram for 2025

The 2019 Ram 1500 saw increases in capability for this new model year with payload increasing to 2,300 pounds (1,000 kg) and maximum trailer towing capacity reaching 12,750 pounds (5,780 kg) when properly equipped. This pairs with a total weight reduction of about 225 pounds (102 kg) compared to the previous generation.

For the 2025 model year, the Ram 1500 received a mid-cycle refresh, and the Hemi V8 engine was discontinued in favor of the 3.0-liter Hurricane twin turbo inline-six engine. The Ram HD received the ZF Powerline 8-speed automatic transmission for Cummins-equipped trucks. The Hemi engine returned for the 2026 model year.

== Concept vehicles ==
=== Revolution ===
The Ram Revolution is Ram's first all-electric concept pickup truck. Featured for the 2024 model year, the Revolution is a body-on-frame design, with two motors providing all-wheel drive. As of January 2023, Ram has not provided any motor specifications other than stating that 100 miles of charge can be achieved within 10 minutes at a Level 3 DC fast-charging station.

== World markets ==
In 2022, Ram trucks were available in the United States, Canada, Mexico, Brazil, Colombia, Argentina, Chile, Paraguay, Peru, Europe, the Philippines, and the Middle East. The Ram trucks officially sold in many Latin American countries are outfitted with UNECE WP.29 lighting equipment, including the taillights with separate amber turn signal indicators.

No right-hand-drive version has been built for Australia, New Zealand, United Kingdom, South Africa, and other countries where the rule of the road is on the left. In 2016, FCA via Ateco commenced selling the Ram 2500 and 3500 in Australia and New Zealand and the Ram 1500 in 2018. These are converted to right-hand drive in Australia before the sale. Pricing commences from $80,000AUD (approximately US$54,000 as of 28 Aug 2019) for the 1500.

Production of the Ram 1500 at the Warren Truck Assembly plant outside of Detroit was discontinued in 2024.

Ram trucks are provided for the European market in cooperation with FCA by AEC Europe in Germany and the Swiss company AutoGlobal Trade. Germany and Scandinavian countries are some of the largest European markets for the Ram. A thriving gray market exists in Australia, New Zealand, and the United Kingdom that has imported and converted Ram trucks to right-hand-drive and to meet the local regulations, being more common in Australia since LHD cars less than 30 years old (or 15 years old if registered in Western Australia) cannot be legally driven on Australian public roads unless they are granted a diplomatic or a research and development exception to the rule. In the United Kingdom and Japan, there is no such restriction, so a stock LHD Ram (or any other LHD vehicle) is not required to undergo the costly and time-consuming process of an RHD conversion in order to be compliant with EU regulations.

=== Nissan Titan ===
Following the collapse of Nissan Titan sales in 2008, there were talks that the next generation of Nissan's full-size pickup would be outsourced to Chrysler as a version of the Ram 1500. Nissan had been planning to phase out Titan production in its Canton, Mississippi factory in 2010 with the new Nissan-only design for a cab, body and interior riding on the Dodge Ram chassis assembled in Chrysler's truck assembly lines in Saltillo, Mexico. However, the deal to build Nissan Titan pickups utilizing the full-size Dodge Ram pickup starting in 2011 was delayed with the changes at Chrysler and Fiat. Nissan eventually decided to keep the Titan, and went on to release the second generation Titan as a 2016 model.

== Special editions ==
- Express – The Express is an edition that offered special badges, 20" tires and wheels from the SLT, cloth seating surfaces, and a 5.7 L Hemi V8 engine.
- 2012 Detroit Red Wings Edition – The Detroit Red Wings Edition is a Crew Cab model with 4×4, special Red Wings seats, and "Detroit Red Wings Edition" decals (on both sides of the box and on the lower left of the tailgate). It is available in red, white, and black. 1,593 were built in two different editions (Edition No. 1: 1,283; Edition No. 2: 310).

== Motorsport ==
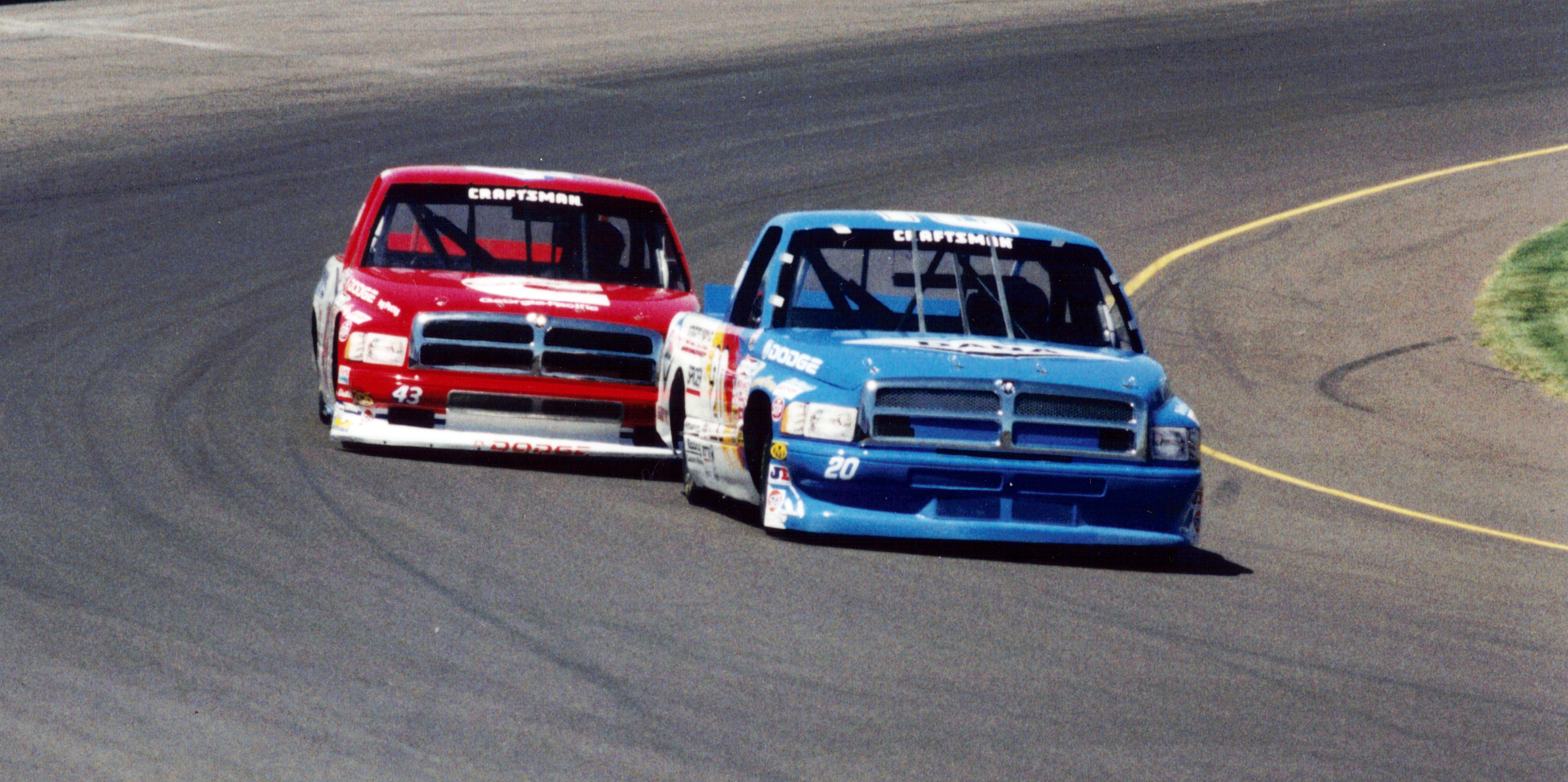
Dodge Ram NASCAR trucks in 1996

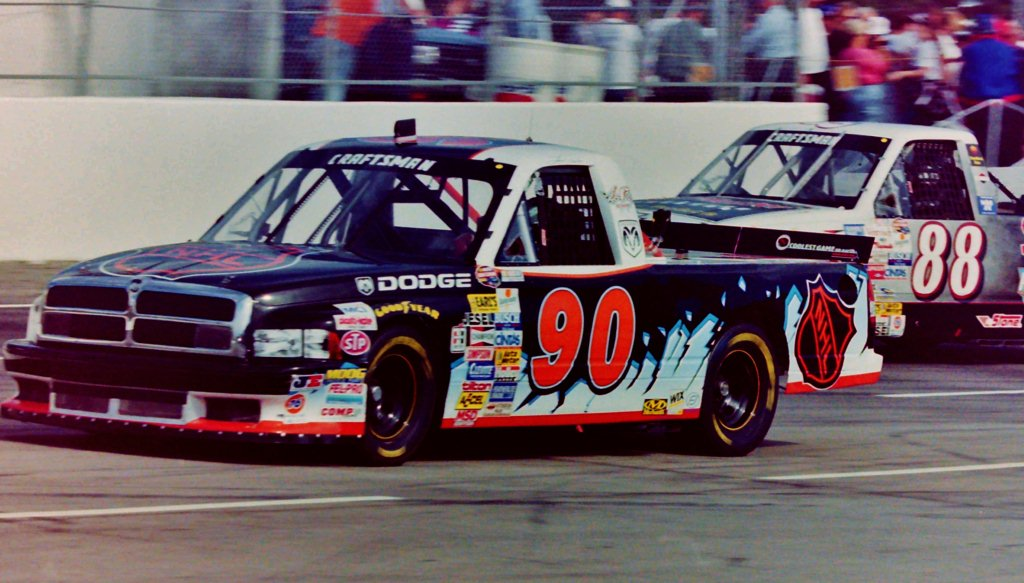
Lance Norick #90 L&R Racing Dodge in 1998

The Ram Pickup represented both the Dodge and Ram brands in the NASCAR Craftsman Truck Series from 1995 to 2016, having won the Manufacturer's Championship in 2001, 2003, and 2004. It returned to Truck Series competition in 2026.

The Ram Pickup also won the San Felipe 250 in 2008 and 2009.

== Sales ==
Year	United States	Canada
1996	383,980	
1997	350,257	
1998	410,999	
1999	428,930	
2000	380,874	
2001	344,538	
2002	396,934	
2003	449,371	
2004	426,289	37,709
2005	400,543	37,483
2006	364,177	39,837
2007	358,295	42,296
2008	245,840	42,736
2009	177,268	30,621
2010	199,652	53,386
2011	244,763	62,929
2012	293,363	67,634
2013	355,673	78,793
2014	439,789	86,590
2015	451,116	89,908
2016	489,418	89,666
2017	500,723	98,465
2018	536,980	84,854
2019	633,694	96,763
2020	563,694	83,672
2021	569,388	73,467
2022	468,344	75,740
2023	444,927	75,257
2024	373,120	56,992
2025	374,059	42,758
Total	12,056,998	1,447,556
Combined Total	13,504,554	
