= Tremec TR-4050 transmission =

The TREMEC TR-4050 is a 5-speed manual transmission for longitudinal engine rear-wheel drive trucks produced by TREMEC. It includes one overdrive gear and a light-weight aluminum housing. New 4WD TR-4050 units are currently available in the United States.

Specifications for 4WD model TDET17341:

- Gear ratios:
  - 1st - 6.16:1
  - 2nd - 3.11:1
  - 3rd - 1.71:1
  - 4th - 1.00:1
  - 5th - 0.76:1
  - Reverse - 6.03:1
- Torque: 600 lb⋅ft (810 N⋅m)
- Chrysler/Jeep Transfer case bolt circle with 23 spline output shaft
- Oil capacity: 3.5 L (3,500 cc)
- Weight: 164 lb (74 kg)
- Length: 29.0 in (737 mm)
- .590 in (15.0 mm) GM pilot diameter with a .750 in (19.1 mm) pilot on the optional Mopar input shaft
- 1.125 in (28.6 mm) Input shaft diameter, 10 spline, GM/Mopar lengths available

== OE applications ==
- Chevrolet Silverado C3500 (2001-2018) (Mexican market)
- Dodge Ram 1500 (2009-2014) and 4000 (2002-2024) (Mexican market)
- Ford Super Duty F-350 (2002-2019) (South American and Mexican market)

== Retrofit applications ==
- Chevrolet C/K K models
- Dodge D Series W models
- 1966-1996 full-size Ford Bronco
- Ford F-Series
- Jeep CJ Jeep CJ-6, Jeep CJ-7, CJ-8 Scrambler
- Jeep Wrangler YJ, TJ, JK
- Jeep Cherokee SJ, XJ
- Jeep Wagoneer SJ, ZJ
- Jeep Gladiator SJ
- Land Rover Defender
