= Sterling Bullet =

Rebadged Dodge Ram Heavy Duty

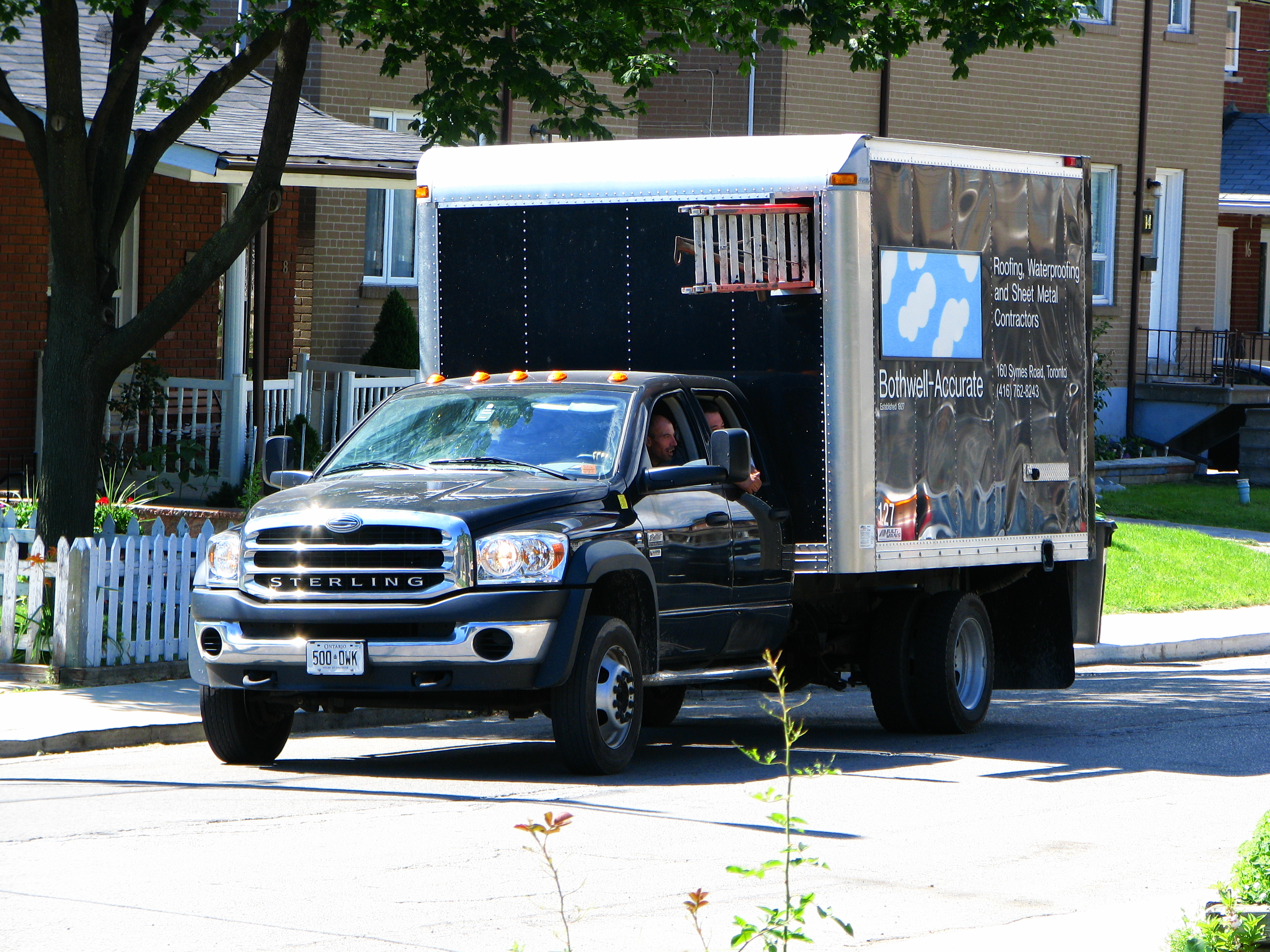

Overview
- Manufacturer: DaimlerChrysler (2006–2007); Chrysler LLC (2007–2009); Chrysler Group LLC (2009)
- Production: 2006–2008
- Model years: 2007–2009

Body and chassis
- Class: Medium Duty class 4 / 5 truck
- Body style: 2-door regular cab 4-door extended cab ("Quad Cab"); Dually
- Layout: Front-engine, rear-wheel drive / four-wheel drive

Powertrain
- Engine: Cummins ISB 6.7 liter I6 turbodiesel
- Transmission: 6-speed AS68RC automatic 6-speed manual

The Sterling Bullet is a medium-duty vocational truck that was marketed by Sterling Trucks from 2007 to 2009. It is a rebadged Dodge Ram, specifically the 3500/4500/5500 Chassis Cab variant, with the most visible difference being the unique grille compared to the 3rd generation Ram.

== Overview ==
Sterling Trucks was a division of Freightliner Trucks which, like Dodge, was owned by the former DaimlerChrysler. The Bullet is a Class 4 and 5 truck and has a Gross Weight of 16,500 lb (7,500 kg) for the Class 4 model and 19,500 lb (8,800 kg) for Class 5.

The chassis for the Bullet was designed for use with a variety of truck configurations, including dump, contractor, towing, and box trucks.

The main difference between the Ram and rebadged Bullet was a new front fascia and both 'Sterling' and 'Bullet' badging on the exterior of the truck. Both 2-Door Regular Cab and 4-Door Quad Cab models were available. To differentiate the Bullet from the related Ram 3500/4500/5500 Chassis Cab, the former was only available with the latter's 6.7L Cummins ISB engine, with no gasoline engine option. Both manual and Aisin AS68RC heavy-duty automatic transmissions were offered (both transmissions were six-speed units), as was two-wheel-drive (rear-wheel-drive) or four-wheel-drive. Standard features included an A/M-F/M radio with single-disc CD/MP3 player and auxiliary audio input, a two-speaker sound system, full instrumentation, vinyl flooring, vinyl seating surfaces, forged steel wheels, black bumpers and front grille, bench seating, and manual windows and door locks. Options included air conditioning, cloth seating surfaces, chrome bumpers and front grille, power windows and door locks, keyless entry, security system, chrome-plated forged steel wheels, a tilt-adjustable steering column, a leather-wrapped steering wheel, a cruise control, and a four-speaker sound system.

== Discontinuation ==
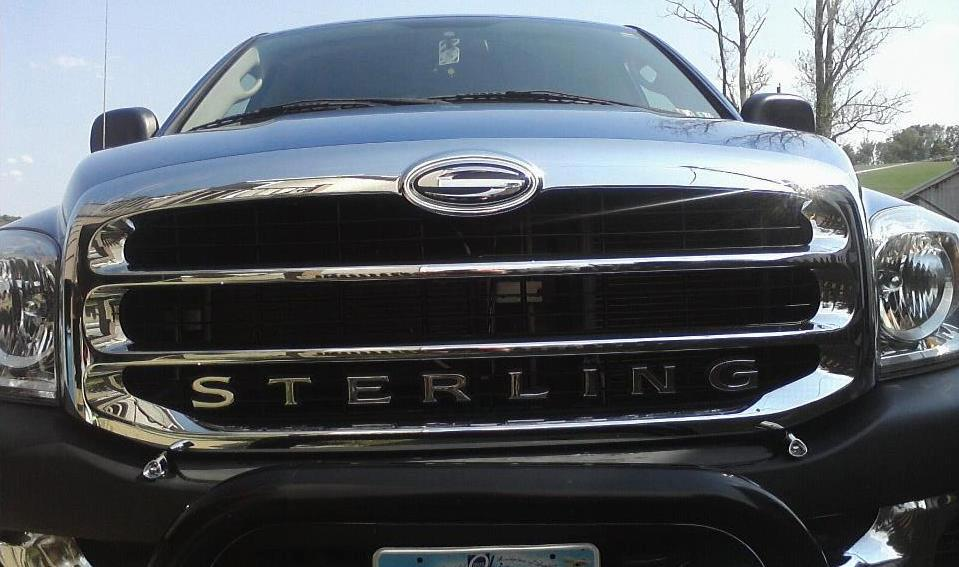
Bullet Grille

The Bullet was discontinued after 2009 after a decision to stop selling the Sterling brand of medium to heavy-duty trucks. Customer support for Sterling trucks at certain dealerships for service and parts would continue.

The equivalent Dodge Ram 3500, 4500, and 5500 chassis cab trucks were sold alongside the Bullet. Thus, there was no replacement for the Bullet with another vehicle. After the 2009 model year, the Ram HD Series of trucks was redesigned.
