= G56 manual transmission =

Transmission system in trucks

The Mercedes-Benz G56 is a heavy-duty longitudinal manual transmission designed for truck use. This six-speed transmission began to be used in the Ram 2500 through 5500 pickup and chassis-cab trucks during the 2005 model year, as the cast-iron 6-speed New Venture Gear 5600 transmission was being phased out. The discontinuation of the G56 for the 2019 refresh of the Ram trucks marked the end of a nearly century-long era of manual transmissions in North American full-size pickup trucks.

== Features ==
The G56 was introduced in 2005, featuring a lightweight aluminum case and a significantly higher input torque capacity than its predecessor, the NV5600. Interestingly, both transmissions were offered simultaneously for the 2005 model year, with the NV5600 being phased out by the start of 2006. However, the G56's feat as the only manual transmission in its class would be short-lived, facing challenges from the ever-increasing torque capacities of modern diesel platforms.

As the torque wars escalated, particularly with engines like the 6.7L Cummins turbodiesel quickly outgrowing the G56's capacity, the manual transmission faced a decline. The horsepower and torque sacrifices of G56-equipped trucks became apparent over the years. The shift towards automatic transmissions in the truck segment became more evident, eventually leading to the retirement of the manual transmission option from the Ram HD lineup after the 2018 model year.

Identifying the G56 is relatively straightforward, particularly as it remained the only manual transmission offered in Ram 2500/3500/4500/5500 models from 2006 through 2018. However, controversies arose around its lubrication requirements. While MOPAR ATF+4 was listed as the required lubricant, debates emerged regarding its adequacy. Alternative lubricants, including MobilTrans SHC DC, were considered, leading to discussions on viscosity grades and their suitability.

== Reliability ==
The G56, despite its robust design, faced various issues, including dual-mass flywheel failures, input shaft bearing problems, and bellhousing cracks. The lubrication controversy played a role in related failures, and reports surfaced of irreparable damage after failures. Rebuilding the G56 required specialized knowledge and tools, making it a relatively expensive gearbox to repair.

The G56's reliability and longevity depended on adhering to best practices. Owners were advised to avoid lugging the engine, select the appropriate gear for the load, resist the temptation of performance upgrades, and change the transmission fluid more frequently. Despite its heavy-duty nature, the G56 operated optimally when used within its design parameters.

== Legacy ==
The demise of the G56 mirrors a broader trend in the industry—the decline of manual transmissions in full-size trucks, and marks the end of a nearly century-long era of North American full-size pickup trucks with manual transmissions. Once a popular choice for their simplicity, strength, efficiency, reliability, and low cost, manual transmissions lost ground as automatics improved in efficiency and durability. The shift was driven by changing consumer preferences, with automatics becoming the norm in the North American truck market.

== Common applications ==
- 2005–2018 Ram 2500
- 2005–2018 Ram 3500
- 2008–2018 Ram 4500
- 2008–2018 Ram 5500
- Mercedes-Benz Atego Truck
- Mercedes-Benz Vario 818
