= New Venture Gear 5600 transmission =

6-speed manual transmission

The NV5600 is a heavy duty, close ratio, 6-speed manual transmission that was used in 1999-2005 Dodge RAM 2500 and 3500 series ¾ ton and 1 ton trucks with 5.9 L Cummins Engines.

It was manufactured by New Venture Gear, a division of Magna Powertrain.

== Specifications ==
- The NV5600 requires a specific lubricant.
- The Mopar part number is 4874464.
- 5W30 "synchromesh" is recommended.
- Input torque: 550 lb⋅ft (750 N⋅m)
- Weight: 360 lb (160 kg)
- Oil capacity: 9.5 pints (10 w/ optional filter)

Close Ratio NV5600 Gearing
1	2	3	4	5	6	R
5.63	3.38	2.04	1.39	1.00	0.73	5.36

Several aftermarket companies make a short throw shifter for the NV5600, which gives the transmission a smoother engagement and driving experience.
