= Equus Bass 770 =

Equus Bass770

Overview
- Manufacturer: Equus Automotive; Panoz (Panoz Equus MR / Equus EQ500) (concept)
- Also called: Equus Bass; Equus EQ500 (concept); Panoz Equus MR (concept)
- Production: 2013–present
- Model years: 2014–present
- Assembly: Detroit, Michigan, U.S.
- Designer: Tom Tjaarda, Bassam Abdallah, Thierry Chalmet

Body and chassis
- Class: Muscle car (D)
- Body style: 2-door fastback coupé
- Layout: FMR layout

Powertrain
- Engine: 5.0 L small block NA V8 (Equus MR/Equus EQ500) (concept); 6.2 L LS9 supercharged V8
- Power output: 640 hp (477 kW; 649 PS); 605 lb⋅ft (820 N⋅m)
- Transmission: 6-speed manual rear-mounted dual-clutch

Dimensions
- Wheelbase: 2,975 mm (117 in)
- Length: 4,927 mm (194 in)
- Width: 1,934 mm (76 in)
- Height: 1,390 mm (55 in)
- Curb weight: 1,651 kg (3,640 lb)

The Equus Bass770 (stylized in all caps as EQUUS BASS770) is a retro-futuristic muscle car manufactured by Equus Automotive, named after its founder, Bassam Abdallah.

At its launch in 2015, six models were available: Accent, Accent Plus, Design, Design Plus, Edition, and Collection.

== Design ==
The Bass770's design was inspired by muscle cars from the 1960s-1970s, most notably, the first generation Ford Mustang fastback, with other design cues taken from the Chevrolet Camaro, Dodge Challenger, Dodge Charger, Plymouth Barracuda, Pontiac GTO, and AMC Marlin. This inspiration extends to the Bass770's interior, which makes heavy use of physical gauges and switches with metal accents.

Despite its styling, the Bass770 comes equipped with various modern comfort features, such as LED lights, parking sensors, an infotainment system and GPS navigation.

== Specifications ==
The car's chassis and body are made of aluminum with carbon fiber linings. The entire vehicle is handcrafted.

The car uses a 6.2 litres (6,162 cc) LS9 supercharged 90.5-degree V8 engine derived from the Chevrolet Corvette ZR1. The engine can deliver up to 640 hp (477 kW; 649 PS) at 6500 rpm and 605 lb⋅ft (820 N⋅m) at 3800 rpm. This enables the car to accelerate from 0–60 mph (0–97 km/h) in 3.4 seconds, and achieve a top speed above 200 mph (322 km/h). Power is delivered to the rear wheels by a 6-speed rear-mounted dual-clutch transmission.

The car's tires measure 255/40ZR19 at the front and 285/40ZR19 at the rear. The car uses Brembo six-piston brake calipers at the front and four-piston calipers at the rear, along with carbon ceramic matrix (CCM) ventilated and cross-drilled brake rotors are utilized for braking. The rotors measure 390 mm (15.5 in) at the front and 360 mm (14 in) at the rear.

The Bass 770 is equipped with driving assists such as a magnetic selective ride control, performance traction management, an active handling system with traction control, and power steering.

Equus Throwback

Overview
- Manufacturer: Equus Automotive
- Production: 2017–present
- Model years: 2018–present
- Assembly: Detroit, Michigan, U.S.
- Designer: Tom Tjaarda

Body and chassis
- Class: Sports car (S)
- Body style: 2-door coupé
- Layout: Front mid-engine, rear-wheel-drive
- Related: Chevrolet Corvette (C7)

Powertrain
- Engine: 6.2 L LT4 supercharged V8
- Power output: 1,000 hp (746 kW; 1,014 PS)
- Transmission: 7-speed Tremec TR-6070 manual; 8-speed GM 8L90 automatic

Dimensions
- Wheelbase: 106.7 in (2,710 mm)
- Length: 178 in (4,521 mm)
- Width: 73.9 in (1,877 mm)
- Height: 48.6 in (1,234 mm)
- Curb weight: 3,444 lb (1,562 kg)
