= Chevrolet Corvette (C7) =

Seventh generation of the Corvette sports car

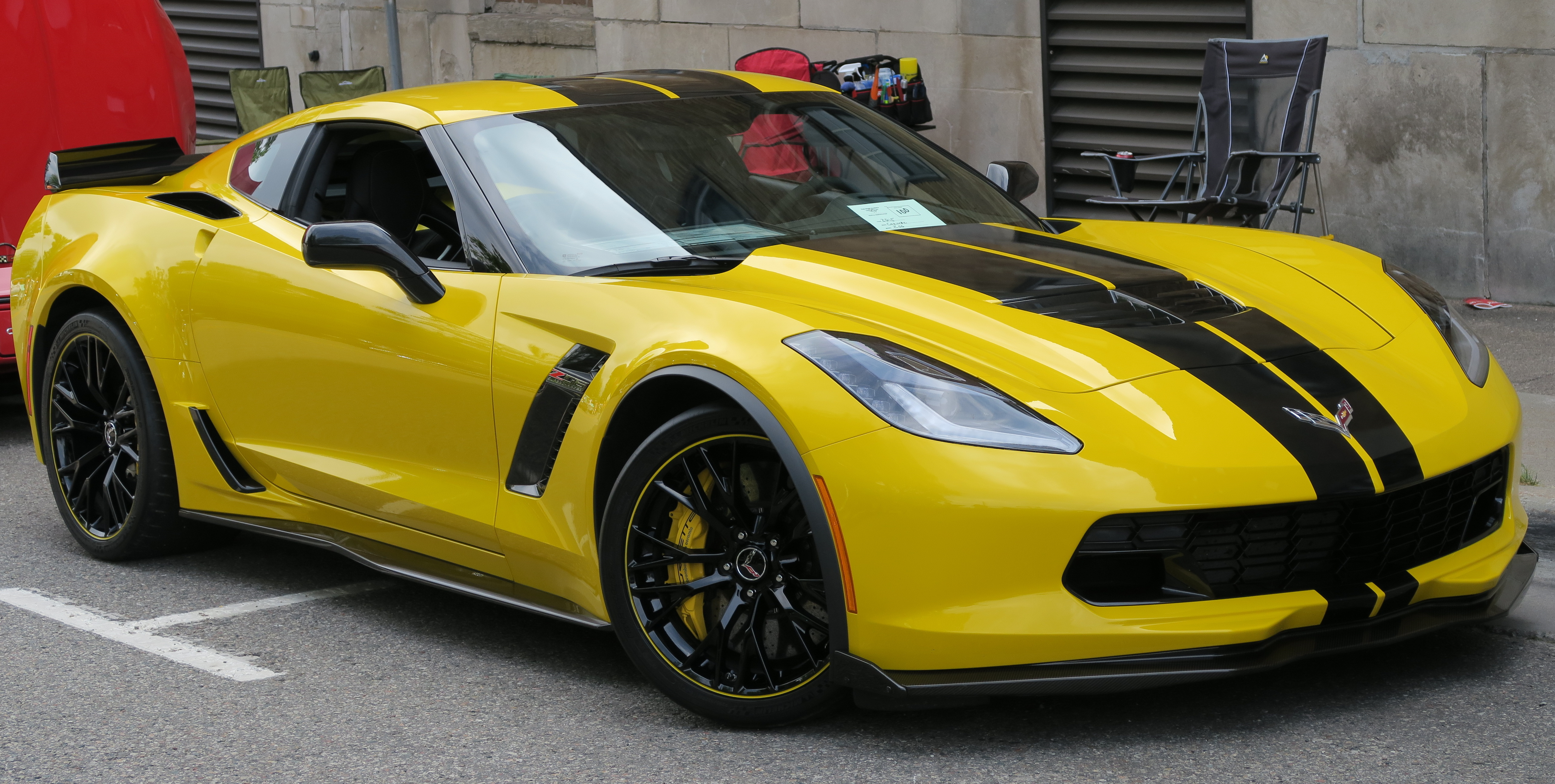
- Chevrolet Corvette Z06

Overview
- Manufacturer: Chevrolet (General Motors)
- Production: September 2013 – July 2017 (due to temporary shutdown of plant); November 2017 – November 2019
- Model years: 2014–2019
- Assembly: United States: Bowling Green, Kentucky
- Designer: Hwasup Lee

Body and chassis
- Class: Sports car (S)
- Body style: 2-door targa top coupe 2-door convertible
- Layout: Front mid-engine, rear-wheel-drive
- Platform: Y-body
- Related: IsoRivolta GTZ Zagato; Equus Throwback

Powertrain
- Engine: 6.2 L LT1 V8; 6.2 L LT4 supercharged V8 (Z06); 6.2 L LT5 supercharged V8 (ZR1 2019 only)
- Transmission: 7-speed Tremec TR-6070 manual; 6-speed GM 6L80 automatic (2014); 8-speed GM 8L90 automatic (2015-2019)

Dimensions
- Wheelbase: 106.7 in (2,710 mm)
- Length: 176.9 in (4,493 mm)
- Width: 73.9 in (1,877 mm)
- Height: 48.6 in (1,234 mm)
- Curb weight: 3,347 lb (1,518 kg) (Base); 3,444 lb (1,562 kg) (Z51); 3,523 lb (1,598 kg) (Z06); 3,560 lb (1,615 kg) (ZR1)

Chronology
- Predecessor: Chevrolet Corvette (C6)
- Successor: Chevrolet Corvette (C8)

The Chevrolet Corvette (C7) is the seventh generation of the Corvette sports car manufactured by American automobile manufacturer Chevrolet from 2014 until 2019. The first C7 Corvettes were delivered in the third quarter of 2013. The racing variants include the C7.R, which won the GTLM 24 Hours of Le Mans.

== Development and introduction ==
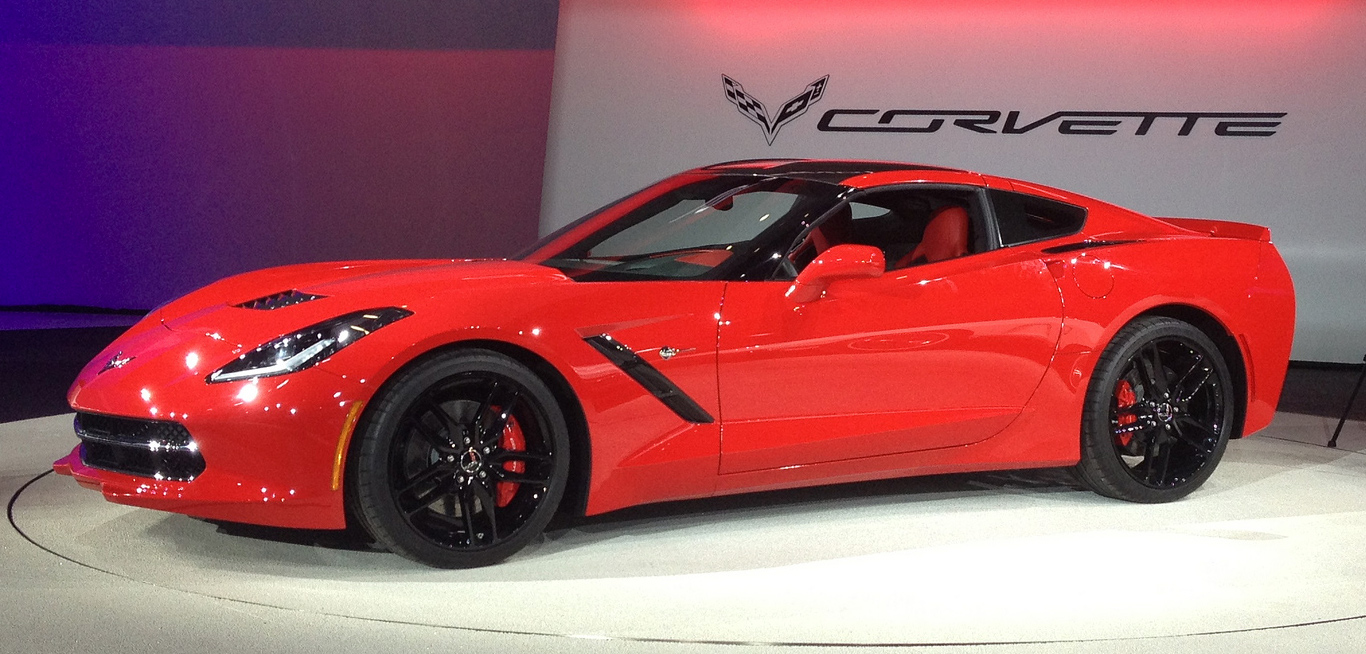
Chevrolet Corvette C7 Stingray

GM executives began planning the next-generation (C7) Corvette sports car in 2007. The car was originally planned for the 2011 model year, but by then it was delayed. Mid-engine and rear-engine layouts had been considered, but the front mid-engine, rear-wheel-drive platform was chosen to keep costs lower.

The lead exterior designer of the C7 Corvette was Hwasup Lee, whose team completed the design between 2010 and 2011. The design director for the C7 was Kirk Bennion and the design was approved by the division's design director, Tom Peters, in 2011.

The 2014 Corvette debuted on Sunday, January 13, 2013, in Detroit at the North American International Auto Show. Chevrolet also showed the new crossed flags logo for the Corvette.

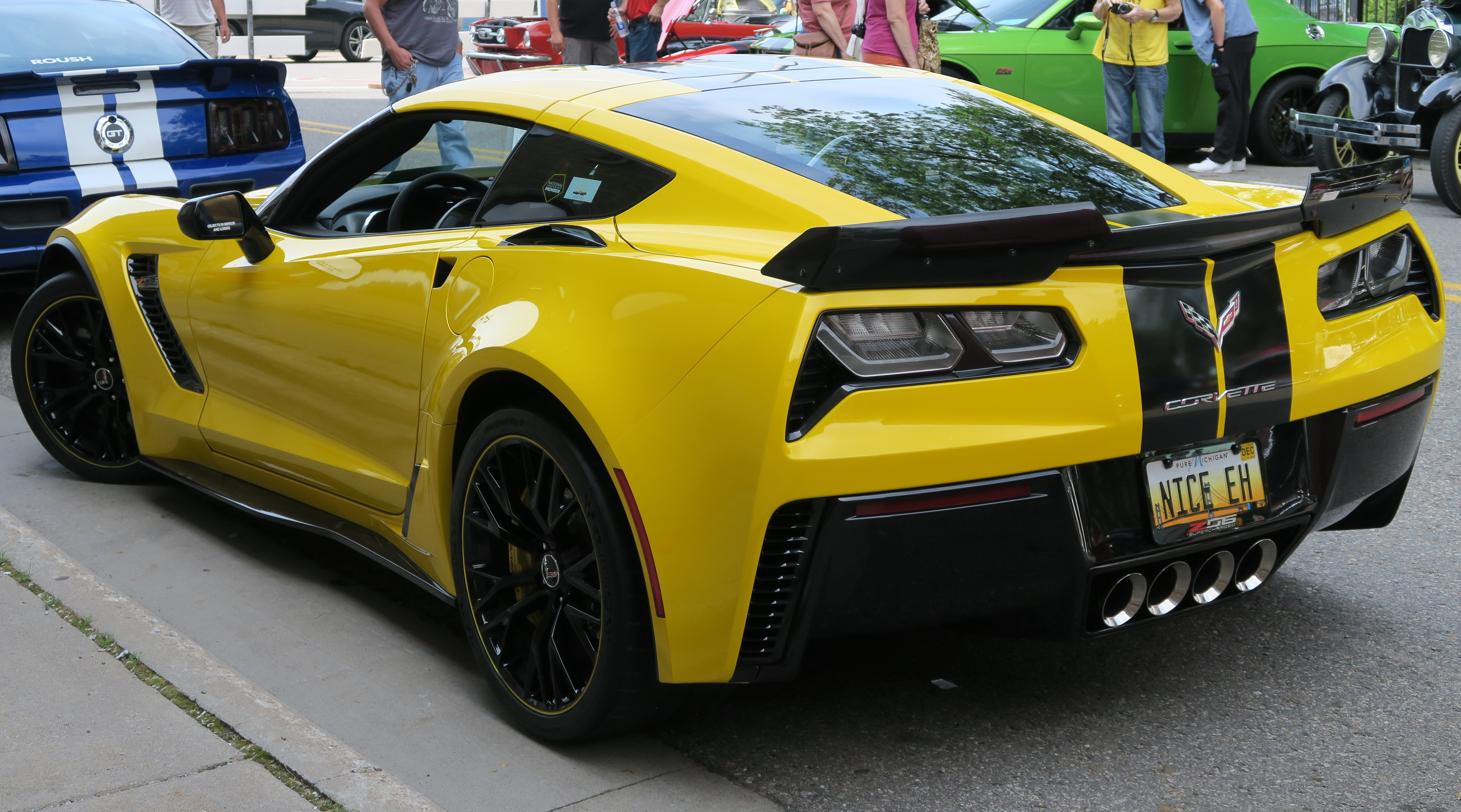
2015 Corvette Z06 (C7)

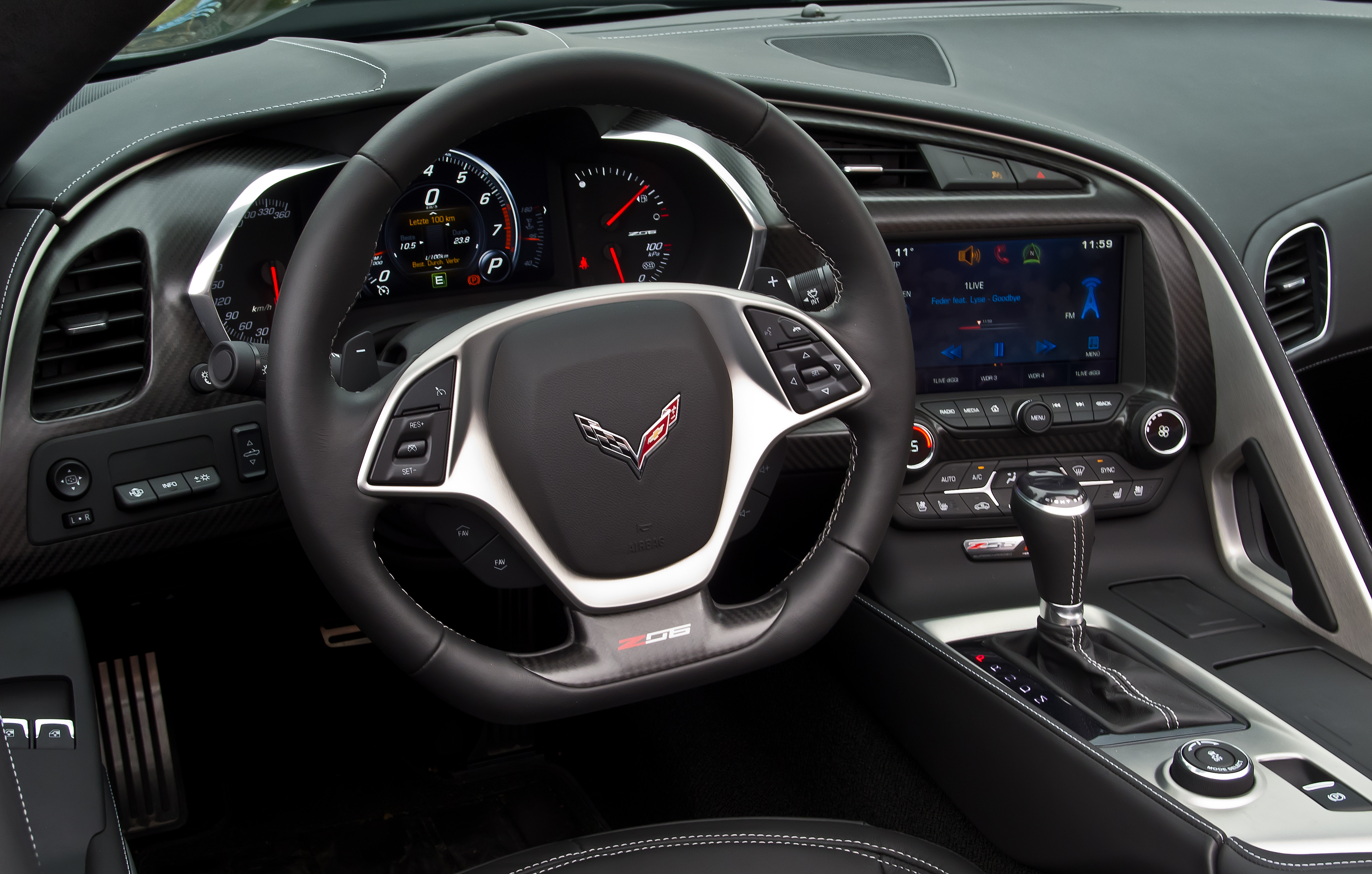
Chevrolet Corvette C7 Z06 interior

While overall the C7 attempts to provide an evolutionary redesign to an iconic theme, the car's designers incorporated aggressive angular elements. The C7 received criticism for some of the more styled elements of the car. "The rear contains what will surely be the C7's most controversial styling elements. It's all creases and vents back there, with aggressive trapezoidal taillights similar to those found on the current Camaro and quadruple-barreled tailpipes lined up in a neat row in the center of the rear valance", wrote Jason Kavanagh for Edmunds. Functional aerodynamic aids are tacked on or cut into every body panel of the C7, often juxtaposed against sharp creases. This is a radical departure from the prior generations of Corvettes, whose styling had no spoiler, few body panel creases, and only semi-functional gills for front brake cooling. In addition, past Corvette models minimized the size of headlamps or even hid them altogether. The C7 reverses that minimalist styling language with intricately styled headlamps with integrated LED daytime running lights (DRL).

The C7's all-new LT1 6.2 L Small Block V-8 engine develops 460 horsepower (340 kW) and 465 pound-feet (630 N⋅m) of torque. This comes with the performance exhaust package, which is already included in the Z51 Performance Package or the level-up model, the Grand Sport, but is very common to see the standalone performance exhaust package being paired up with the base model. Without the performance exhaust, the powertrain produces 455 horsepower (339 kW) and 460 pound-feet (620 N⋅m) of torque. With the performance exhaust, the car can accelerate from 0–60 mph (97 km/h) in 3.7 seconds when paired with the eight-speed automatic gearbox. The C7's suspension consists of independent unequal-length double wishbones with transverse fiberglass mono-leaf springs and optional magnetorheological dampers, similar to its predecessor.

== 2014 model year ==
=== Production ===
Production and customer delivery of the 2014 Corvette Stingray Coupe began in September 2013. Corvette assembly plant tours in Bowling Green, Kentucky, began in October 2013. Production of the Stingray Convertible began at the end of 2013. The fifth generation of the small block engine used in the 2014 Chevrolet Corvette Stingray was built in GM's Tonawanda Engine Plant.

The first production 2014 Chevrolet Corvette Stingray Convertible was sold in 2013 Barrett-Jackson Palm Beach to Hendrick Motorsports owner Rick Hendrick for US$1,000,000 in a Barbara Ann Karmanos Cancer institute charity lot.

A month after the first 2014 Corvette Stingray, 485 vehicles had been delivered. Of these early orders, 38% included 7-speed manual transmission, and 75% included the Z51 Performance Package (54% also selected the magnetic ride suspension system).

=== Equipment ===
The 2014 Corvette features a carbon fiber hood and removable roof panel. Its fenders, doors, and rear quarter panels remain fiberglass composite. The C7 uses Aerogel, a material developed by NASA, to keep heat from the transmission tunnel from transferring into the cabin. The under-body panels are made of "carbon-nano" composite. The chassis is made of hydro-formed aluminum. The rear tail lights use indirect LED technology.

Despite the increased use of aluminum and other light weight materials, the overall weight of the car remains the same as that of the previous generation (C6). The C7 Corvette offers a seven-speed manual transmission made by Tremec that implements active rev matching. The Corvette also provides a driver mode selector with five settings: Weather, Eco, Tour, Sport, and Track mode. The hood and side vents and inlets assist in cooling and aerodynamic stability. The interior features a driver display that allows the driver to select from several modes with up to 69 different sources of information, ranging from an interactive performance timer to a tire tread temperature display. Two seat options are available: a touring seat for everyday use, and a competition sports seat for track driving with pass-throughs for a racing harness.

The 2014 Corvette LT1 engine, the first of the fifth generation family of small block engines, retains the push-rods acting on overhead valves design. It implements direct fuel injection, Active Fuel Management (cylinder deactivation), and continuously variable valve timing.

=== Models and special editions ===
==== Corvette Stingray Coupe ====
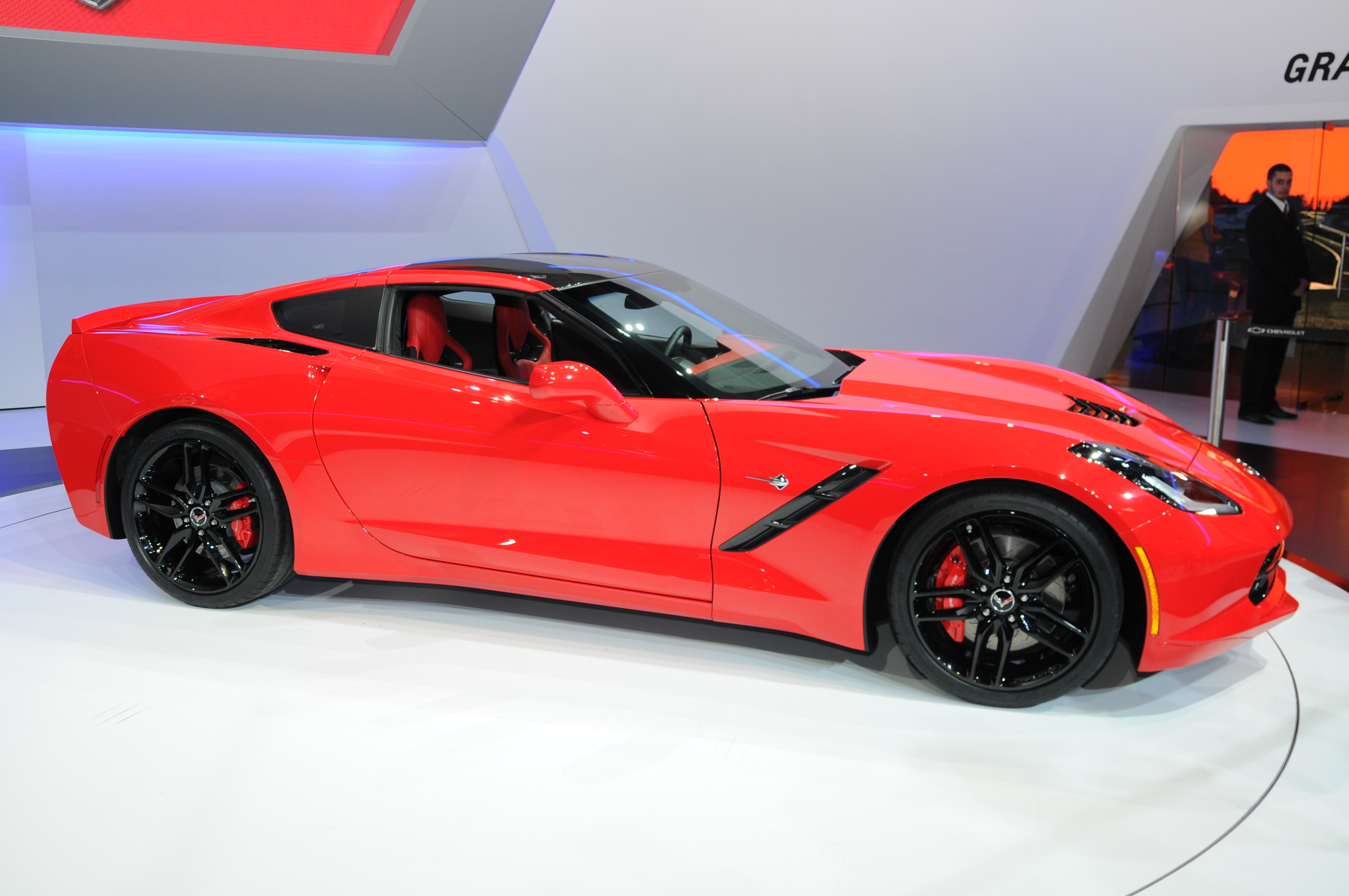
The C7 Corvette coupé at the 2013 Geneva Motor Show

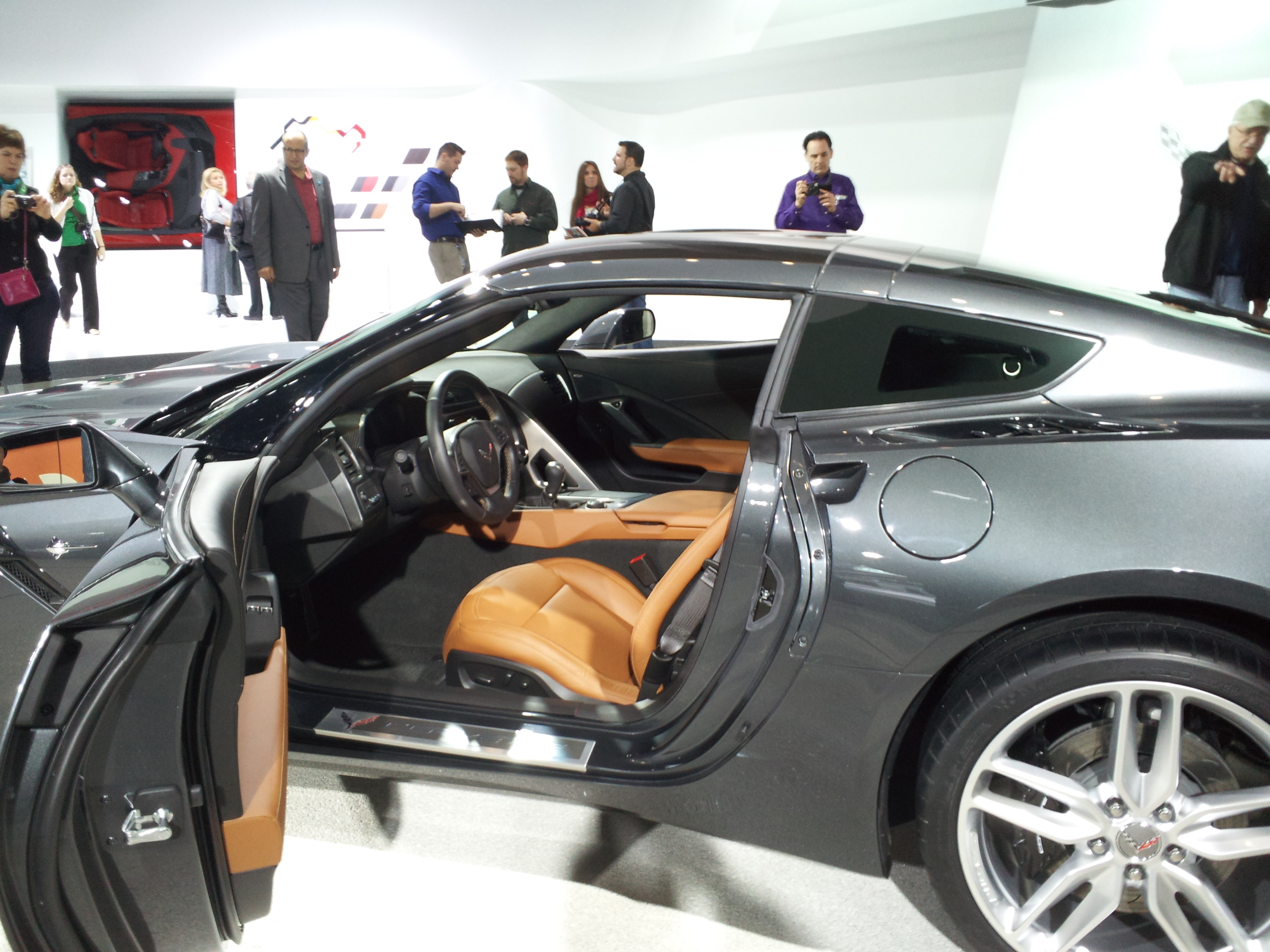
The C7 Corvette at the 2013 North American International Auto Show showing the Kalahari color interior in a Cyber Gray coupé

The Corvette Stingray Coupe went on sale in the US in the third quarter of 2013, as a 2014 model-year vehicle. The 2014 Corvette was equipped with a Tremec TR-6070 7-speed manual with rev-matching for both downshifts and upshifts, or a Hydramatic 6L80 6-speed paddle-shift automatic transmission optimized for Active Fuel Management.

In Japan, sales of the Corvette Stingray Coupe and Z51 version began in April 2014.

The top-level 3LT interior package includes a Bose 10-speaker audio system, SiriusXM radio with HD receiver, color head-up display, Performance Data Recorder, memory package, navigation system, heated and ventilated seats with power lumbar and bolster adjustment, premium Napa leather seating surfaces, and leather-wrapped dash, instrument panel, console, and door panels.

==== Corvette Stingray Convertible ====
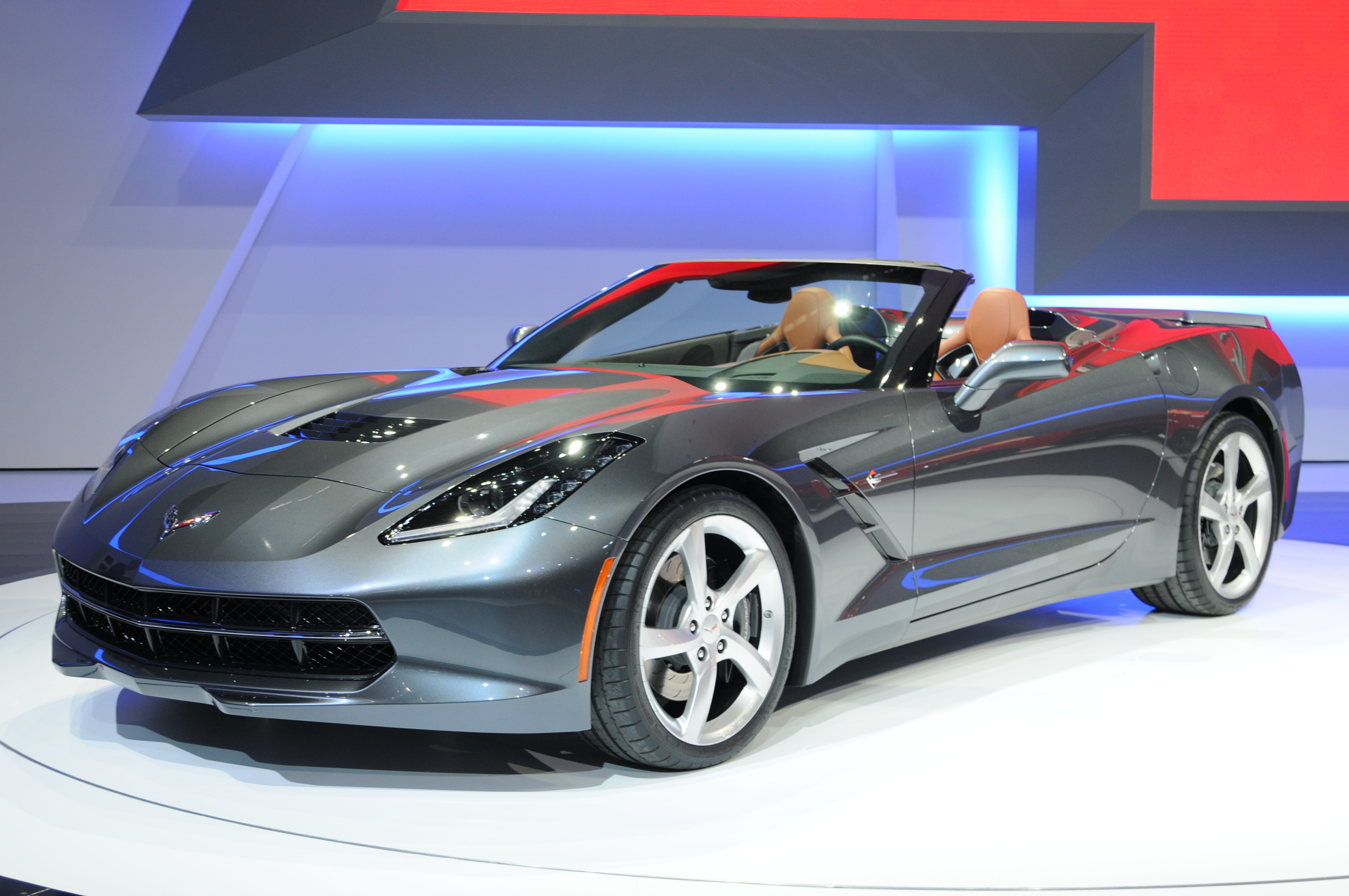
C7 Corvette Convertible at the 2013 Geneva Motor Show

The 2014 Stingray Convertible is a version of the 2014 Corvette Stingray with a power-operated fabric roof. The roof can be opened at speeds of up to 30 mph (50 km/h). The convertible was unveiled at the 2013 Geneva Motor Show. The Japanese version went on sale in May 2014.

==== Z51 Performance Package ====
The Z51 Performance Package includes dry sump lubrication, specific close-ratio gearing, transmission-cooling system, 19-inch front and 20-inch rear aluminum alloy wheels and dual-compound Michelin tires (increasing the tire diameter by one inch from the base Stingray), larger slotted rotors and brake-cooling ducts, electronic limited-slip differential and differential cooling system, unique chassis tuning, and optional Magnetic Ride Control active-handling system with Performance Traction Management. A Z51 Stingray also comes with Brembo brakes, which massively improve the braking performance from the base model. The performance exhaust package that comes included in the Z51 Performance Package gives the LT1 engine 460 horsepower and 465 pound-feet of torque. Its center of gravity height is 17 1/2"; lower than the Lotus Elise.

==== 2013 SEMA concepts ====
Three Corvette Stingray concepts were displayed at the 2013 SEMA Show.

The Corvette Stingray Gran Turismo concept was made to promote the Gran Turismo 6 video game, and was one of the playable cars. It features a custom blue paint scheme, yellow-tinted headlamps, carbon fiber rear spoiler, ground effects kit, and front splitter; and a custom front grille, front fender, and rear quarter vents.

The Corvette Stingray Convertible Atlantic concept had a Blade Silver body color, Carbon Flash Metallic front splitter, rocker extensions and rear lower diffuser, Fusion Gray headlamp housings and hood accents, a faux suede wrapped interior package, chrome five-spoke wheels, molded splash guards, a windscreen mounted behind the seats. The Corvette Stingray Coupe Pacific concept had a Torch Red body color, Z51 Performance Package, a carbon fiber hood, trim kit, and removable roof panel; a black front splitter and rocker extensions, Z51 rear spoiler, a Carbon Flash graphics package, and satin black aluminum wheels with a red accent stripe.

==== Premiere Editions ====
The 2014 Corvette Stingray Premiere Edition marked the introduction of both the coupe and convertible. The coupe version, which debuted in 2013, was limited to 500 units in Laguna Blue Tintcoat. The convertible, which debuted in early 2014, was limited to 550 units in Lime Rock Green. Both versions featured Brownstone faux suede interior, carbon-fiber interior and roof, Z51 Performance Package, Magnetic Selective Ride Control, a "stinger" hood stripe, custom luggage from Thule, and an exclusive dash plaque.

== 2015 model year ==
=== Production ===
In 2015, the 8L90 eight-speed automatic transmission was available as an option for all Corvette models. The 8L90 is built at GM's Toledo, Ohio, transmission facility.

=== Equipment ===
Major changes for the 2015 model year, in addition to the reintroduction of the Z06, were limited to the introduction of the 8L90 automatic transaxle (replacing the 6L80 transaxle), as well as the dual mode exhaust becoming standard on Z51 cars.

==== Performance Data Recorder ====
The Performance Data Recorder (PDR) is an optional system that allows Corvette drivers to record performance data while driving and review the results. A 720p high-definition camera mounted within the windshield header trim records the driver's point-of-view through the windshield, with audio recorded via a dedicated microphone in the cabin. The system uses a dedicated GPS receiver more precise than the one in the navigation system. The recorder can access vehicle information, ranging from engine speed and transmission-gear selection to braking force and steering-wheel angle. It uses a dedicated SD-card for recording and transferring video and vehicle data.

The PDR system can record video with three data overlay options, each rendered in real time. "Track Mode" shows the most data on the screen, including speed, rpm, g-force, a location-based map, and lap time. "Sport Mode" shows fewer details but includes key data including speed and g-force. "Touring Mode" shows no data; it simply records and displays video and audio of the drive. Additionally, "Performance Mode" records performance metrics, such as 0 to 60 mph (97 km/h) acceleration, 1/4-mile speed and elapsed time, and 0–100–0 mph (0–161–0 km/h) runs.

The PDR vehicle data can be viewed in the included "Cosworth Toolbox" software. The application overlays recorded laps on a satellite map of the track, and allows lap-by-lap comparison of vehicle speed, time, and cornering force. The video can be viewed on the Corvette Stingray's eight-inch color touchscreen (when the car is parked), or transferred to a computer for editing and sharing on social media.

=== Models and special editions ===
==== Z06 ====
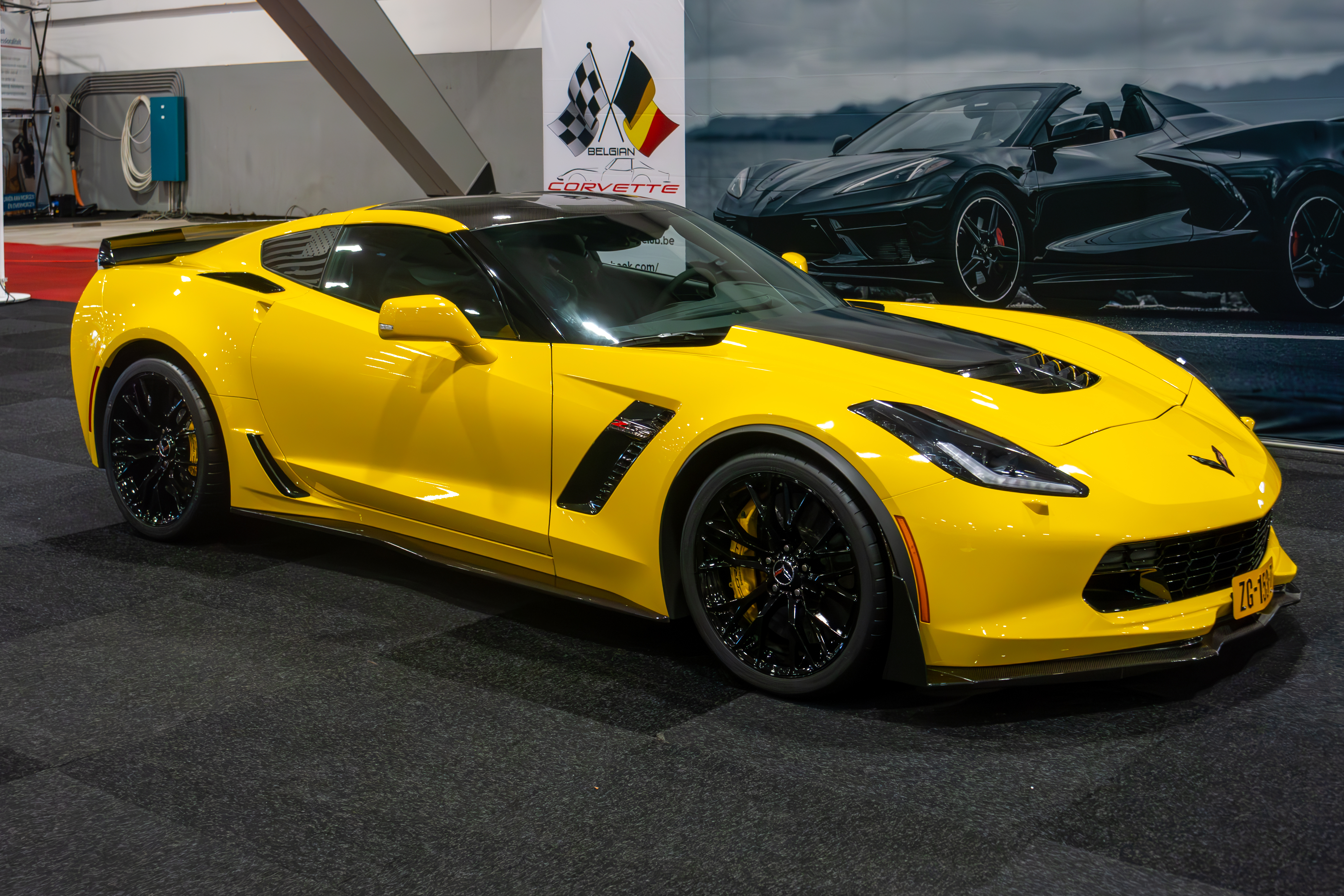
Corvette Z06

For the 2015 model year, a performance version of the Corvette called the Z06 was introduced at the North American International Auto Show. The Z06 comes with a 6.2 L (376 cu in) supercharged and intercooled LT4 V8 engine with Rotocast A356T6 aluminum cylinder heads and a 1.7-liter Eaton R1740 TVS Supercharger, which generates 650 hp (659 PS; 485 kW) at 6,400 rpm and 650 lb⋅ft (881 N⋅m) of torque at 3,600 rpm, giving the Z06 a top speed of 185 mph (298 km/h). The Z06 is available with a Tremec seven-speed manual with rev-matching technology or a Hydramatic 8L90 eight-speed automatic transmission with paddle shifters.

Changes to the body of the Z06 include a removable carbon fiber roof panel, a front splitter, a unique carbon fiber hood with a larger vent, larger front fender vents and unique air blades over the inlets on the rear fenders, a larger unique rear spoiler, and rear-fascia openings that are larger than that of the Stingray. The redesigned mesh pattern on the front fascia allows for maximum airflow to the supercharger's intercooler heat exchanger, while dedicated brake-cooling intakes and wider grille outlets on the bottom serves as air diffusers. It rides on 19×10-inch front and 20×12-inch rear spin-cast aluminum wheels on Michelin Pilot Sport P285/30ZR19 front and 335/25ZR20 rear tires.

Inside the Z06, there are a choice of two magnesium frame seats (GT seat or a Competition Sport seat with more aggressive side bolstering), a steel-reinforced grab bar on the center console for the passenger, soft-touch materials on the edge of the console, and a fully wrapped interior with Nappa leather, aluminum, carbon fiber, and microsuede, depending on the trim level.

Mechanical features of the Z06 include Brembo brakes (371×33-mm front and 365×25-mm rear two-piece steel disc brakes, aluminum six-piston front and four-piston rear fixed calipers), uniquely calibrated SLA-type front and rear suspension design, Magnetic Ride Control dampers, electronic limited-slip differential (eLSD) integrated with electronic stability control, and Performance Traction Management.

The US model of the Z06 went on sale in January 2015, with a base price of US$78,995 (~$104,694 in 2025). Chevrolet offered buyers of the Z06 an opportunity to personally assemble the engine used in their cars at the Bowling Green, Kentucky assembly plant where they are built as part of a US$5,000 (~$6,627 in 2025) package beginning in March 2015.

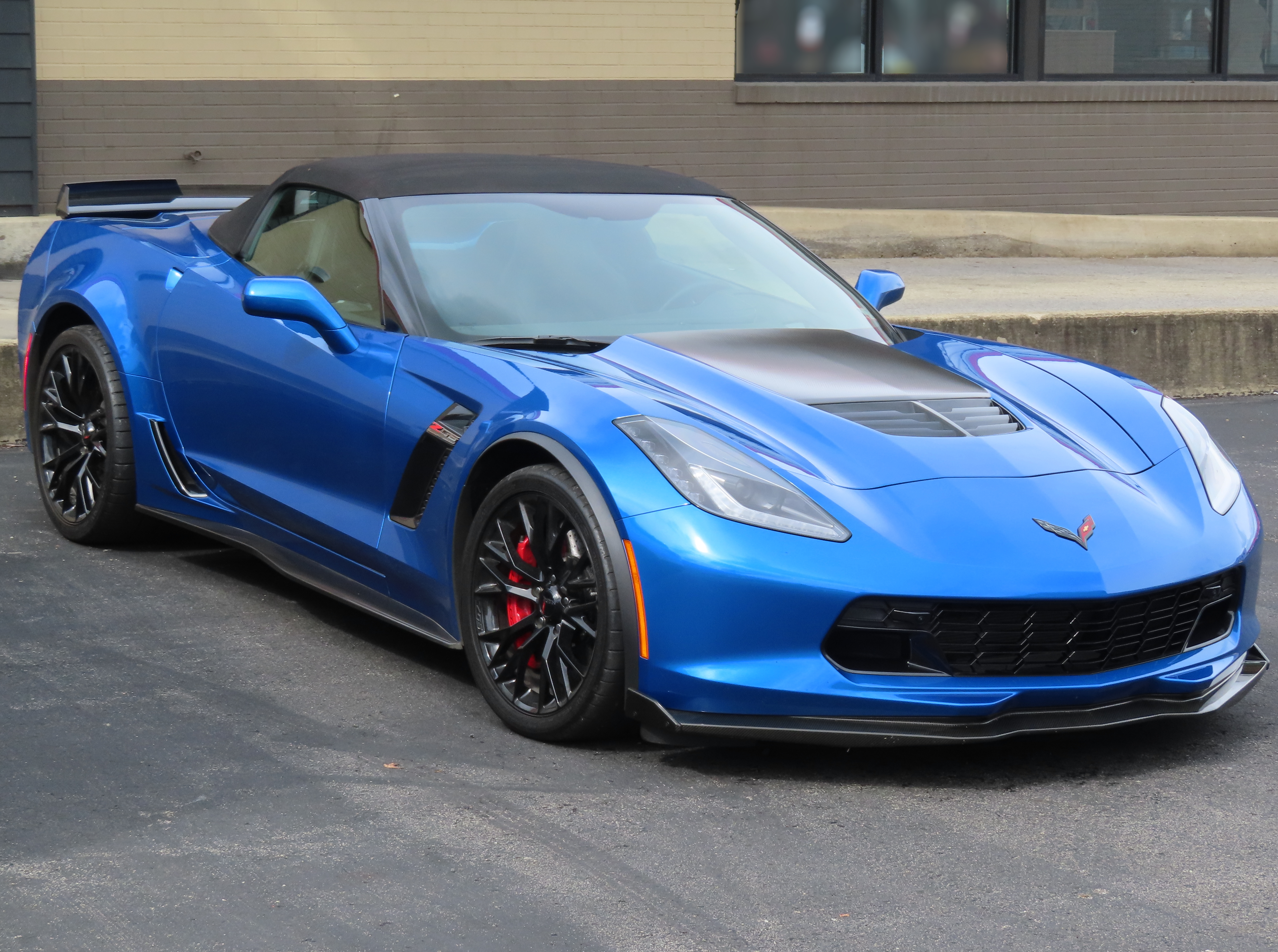
Chevrolet Corvette Z06 Convertible

The Corvette Z06 Convertible includes a power-folding top that can activate at driving speeds up to 50 km/h (31 mph), as well as repositioned safety-belt mounts. It was unveiled at the 2014 New York International Auto Show, alongside the Corvette Z06 coupe.

==== Z07 performance package ====
The Z07 performance package includes Michelin Pilot Sport Cup 2 P285/30ZR19 front and 335/25ZR20 rear tires, 394x36mm front and 388x33mm rear carbon ceramic-matrix brake discs, and revised suspension tuning (RPO FE7) which raises spring rates front and rear 62% and 22% respectively, changes stabilizer bar bushing material, and fits the Magnetorheological shocks with modified valving for a higher “passive” curve in addition to more aggressive damping tuning.

The optional stage 2 carbon-fiber aero package (in either black or a visible carbon-fiber finish) adds a carbon fiber front splitter with small winglets, carbon fiber rocker panels, and a larger rear spoiler while stage 3 builds on that with larger front splitter winglets and a clear, adjustable wickerbill – a small, vertical section in the middle of the rear spoiler that significantly increases downforce.

==== Atlantic/Pacific Design Package ====
The 2015 Corvette Stingray Atlantic Design Package is based on Z51-equipped Corvette Stingray convertibles with 2LT or 3LT trim. The package includes a Z06-style front splitter, Shark Gray exterior vents, "stinger" graphic and tonneau inserts on the hood, chrome wheels, Stingray logos, and custom luggage bags.

The 2015 Corvette Stingray Pacific Design Package is based on the Z51-equipped Corvette Stingray coupe with 2LT or 3LT trim. The package includes satin black full-length racing stripes, satin black Z51 wheels with red stripe and Stingray center caps, carbon fiber ground effect package along with exposed carbon fiber roof panel, Carbon Flash rear spoiler, red brake calipers, Competition Sport seats, carbon fiber interior trim, and an indoor car cover.

== 2016 model year ==
=== Production ===
A mid-year production change involved the phasing out of 4 exterior colors and the addition of a new color, Admiral Blue, at the end of the 2016 production run.

=== Models and special editions ===
Three "design packages" were offered: the Twilight Blue Design Package, Spice Red Design Package, and Jet Black Suede Design Package. They were available on 3LT and 3LZ trim models. The Twilight Blue and Spice Red packages included full-color instrument panel, doors, and seats, chrome badges, and Shark Gray painted exterior vents. Convertible models included a blue, red, or black top matching the package. The packages included special aluminum wheels, 19-inch front and 20-inch rear, painted Pearl Nickel in the Twilight Blue and Spice Red packages for the Z06, and Satin Black in the Jet Black package. The design packages were offered with white, gray, and silver exterior colors, along with a color matching the package (Night Race Blue, Long Beach Red, and Black, respectively).

==== Z06 C7.R Edition (ZCR) ====
Available only with 3LZ trim, the Z06 C7.R Edition is primarily an appearance package. Interior features include a Jet Black leather trimmed and faux suede-wrapped interior, competition sport seats, faux suede-wrapped steering wheel and shifter, yellow contrast stitching, carbon fiber interior package, C7.R Limited-Edition interior plaque (includes racing victories) and Corvette Racing sill plates. On the exterior, changes include black Z06 Wheels with yellow stripe, yellow brake calipers, Corvette Racing wheel center caps, visible carbon fiber, Spectra Gray grille and vents, C7.R graphics, and the Z07 Performance Package with carbon ceramic brakes. The package is available in either Black or Corvette Racing Yellow exterior colors. It included its own sequential VIN starting with 700001. Only 500 units were produced.

== 2017 model year ==
=== Production ===
Production for the 2017 model year began on July 11, 2016, and ended on May 29, 2017, with the 2018 model year production officially beginning the following week.

=== Models and special editions ===
==== Grand Sport (Z15) ====
In April 2016, at the Geneva Auto Show, Tadge Juechter, the chief engineer on the C7, introduced the new Grand Sport model for the 2017 model year. The Grand Sport is a hybrid of the Z51 Stingray and the Z06; sharing much of the wide body work of the Z06 (except the hood) with the Z51 LT1 dry sump engine. The Grand Sport features:

- Michelin Pilot Super Sport summer tires: 285/30ZR19 (front) and 335/25ZR20 (rear)
- unique Grand Sport wheel design: 19x10 inches (front) and 20x12 inches (rear)
- Brembo brake system: 14 in (356 mm) rotors and six-piston calipers in front, and 13.4 in (340 mm) rotors and four-piston calipers in the rear
- magnetic ride control, specific stabilizer bars and unique springs
- electronic limited-slip differential
- LT1 V8 engine rated at 460 hp (343 kW), with dry-sump oiling system and active exhaust
- 7-speed manual transmission, with active rev match and available eight-speed paddle-shift automatic with specific performance calibration

Grand Sport models are offered as a convertible or coupe with either a 7-speed manual or 8-speed automatic transmission.

An available Z07 package adds carbon ceramic-matrix brakes and Michelin Pilot Sport 2 Cup tires. An available Heritage Package includes interior brushed aluminum hash marks, and floor mats with the Grand Sport logo.

==== Grand Sport Collector Edition (Z25) ====
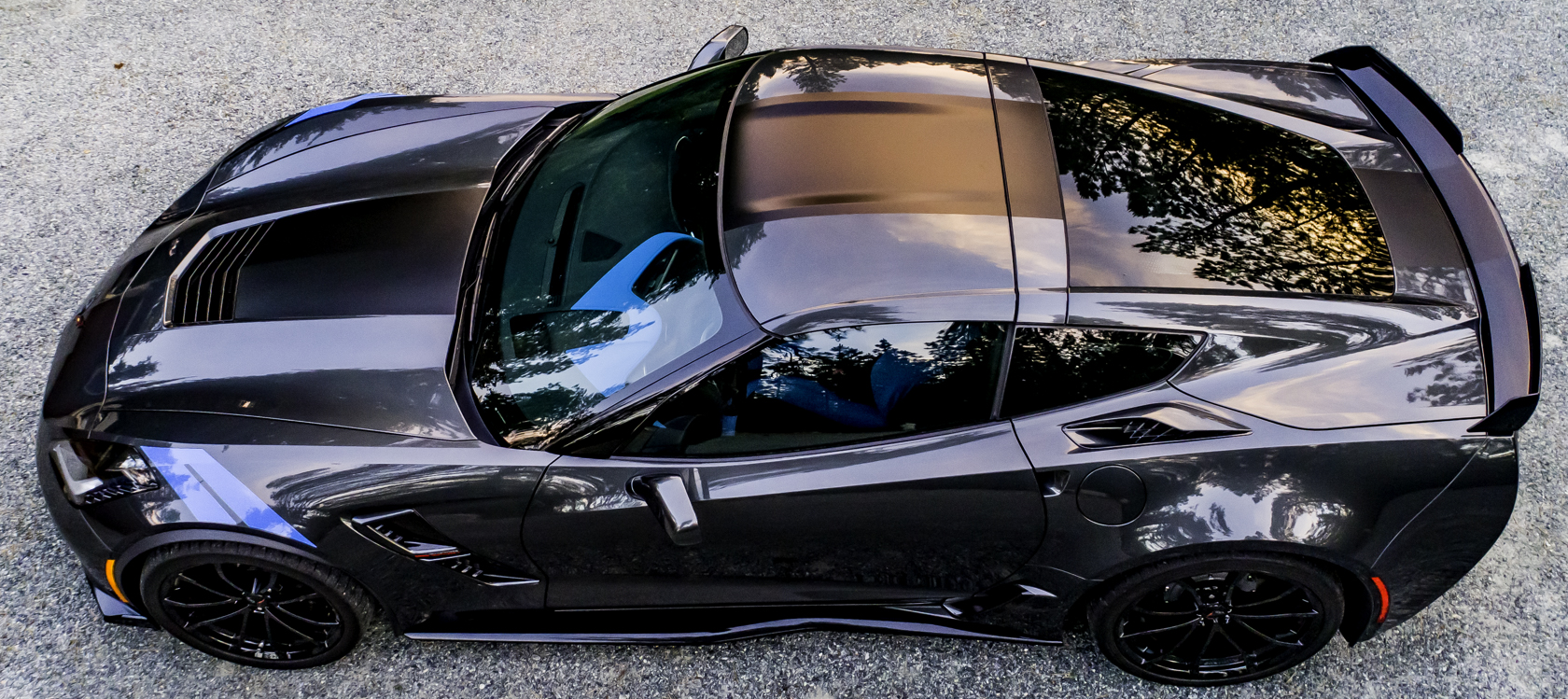
2017 Chevrolet Corvette Grand Sport Collector Edition #43

As part of the introduction of the Grand Sport, Chevrolet also introduced a Grand Sport Collector Edition, which was meant to be limited to 1,000 vehicles, with 850 allocated to the US market. 784 coupes and 151 convertibles were built; 935 total. The Collectors Edition was a cosmetic package that contained some unique features, including Tension Blue fender hash-marks, two-tone Tension Blue leather seating surfaces with an embossed Grand Sport logo on the headrest, blue leather stitching, and a numbered dash plaque.

The registry for the Grand Sport Collector Edition has collected specific production configurations and details of the vehicles in the series.

== 2018 model year ==
=== Production ===
Production for the 2018 model year officially began on June 5, 2017. Production was suspended on July 28, when the plant shut down for new paint facility upgrades as well as the addition of a new assembly line for the 2019 ZR1 model. Plant tours were suspended for 18 months as a result of this shut down. The plant resumed production on November 6, 2017. The 2018 model year ended on January 26, 2018.

=== Models and special editions ===
The Stingray, Grand Sport and Z06 models continued into the 2018 model year.

==== Carbon 65 Edition (Z30) ====
Commemorating the 65th anniversary of the Corvette, Chevrolet offered the Carbon 65 Limited Edition for the 2018 model year. This edition was limited to 650 units globally, painted exclusively in Ceramic Matrix Gray. It was available on Grand Sport 3LT and Z06 3LZ trims in both convertible (blue top only) and coupe bodies. The Carbon 65 Edition option package included unique fender stripes and door graphics, black wheels with machined grooves on summer-only tires, blue brake calipers, a Jet Black faux suede-wrapped interior with blue stitching, and various unique badges. Carbon fiber applications included visible ground effects, hood section and roof (coupe) or tonneau inserts (convertible), spoiler, steering wheel rim, and gloss interior trim.

== 2019 model year ==
2019 was the final model year for the seventh generation of the Corvette. Chevrolet auctioned off the final C7 Corvette, a black Z06 coupe, at a Barrett-Jackson charity auction held in Connecticut on June 28, 2019. The actual car was assembled in November 2019.

=== Drivers Series ===
In January 2019, Chevrolet introduced a special edition of the Corvette Grand Sport called the Drivers Series. This edition features four paint schemes each selected by Corvette Racing team's drivers Tommy Milner, Oliver Gavin, Jan Magnussen, and Antonio Garcia. The livery selected by Tommy Milner includes an Elkhart Lake Blue exterior with silver stripes and red hash marks, body-color mirrors, black wheels with red stripe and red brake calipers, and a Jet Black faux suede interior with red seat belts. The livery selected by Oliver Gavin includes a Shadow Gray exterior with Torch Red center stripe and Torch Red hash marks, Carbon Flash mirrors, black wheels with red stripe, red brake calipers, and an Adrenaline Red interior with red seat belts. The livery selected by Jan Magnussen includes an Arctic White exterior with Crystal Red stripes and gray hash marks, body-color mirrors, black wheels with red stripe and red brake calipers and a Jet Black interior with red seat belts. The livery selected by Antonio Garcia includes a Racing Yellow exterior with “Jake” stinger stripe, red hash marks, Carbon Flash mirrors, black wheels with red stripe and red brake calipers, and a Jet Black interior.

All four of the special liveries were available on the Grand Sport. The cars also came fitted with an interior plaque commemorating each driver and other unique trim details. The Drivers Series Corvettes went on sale in Spring 2019.

A total of 95 2019 Corvettes were equipped with the Drivers Series Package. Of those, 14 had the Antonio Garcia livery, 21 had the Tommy Milner livery, 25 had the Jan Magnussen livery, and 35 had the Oliver Gavin livery.

=== ZR1 ===
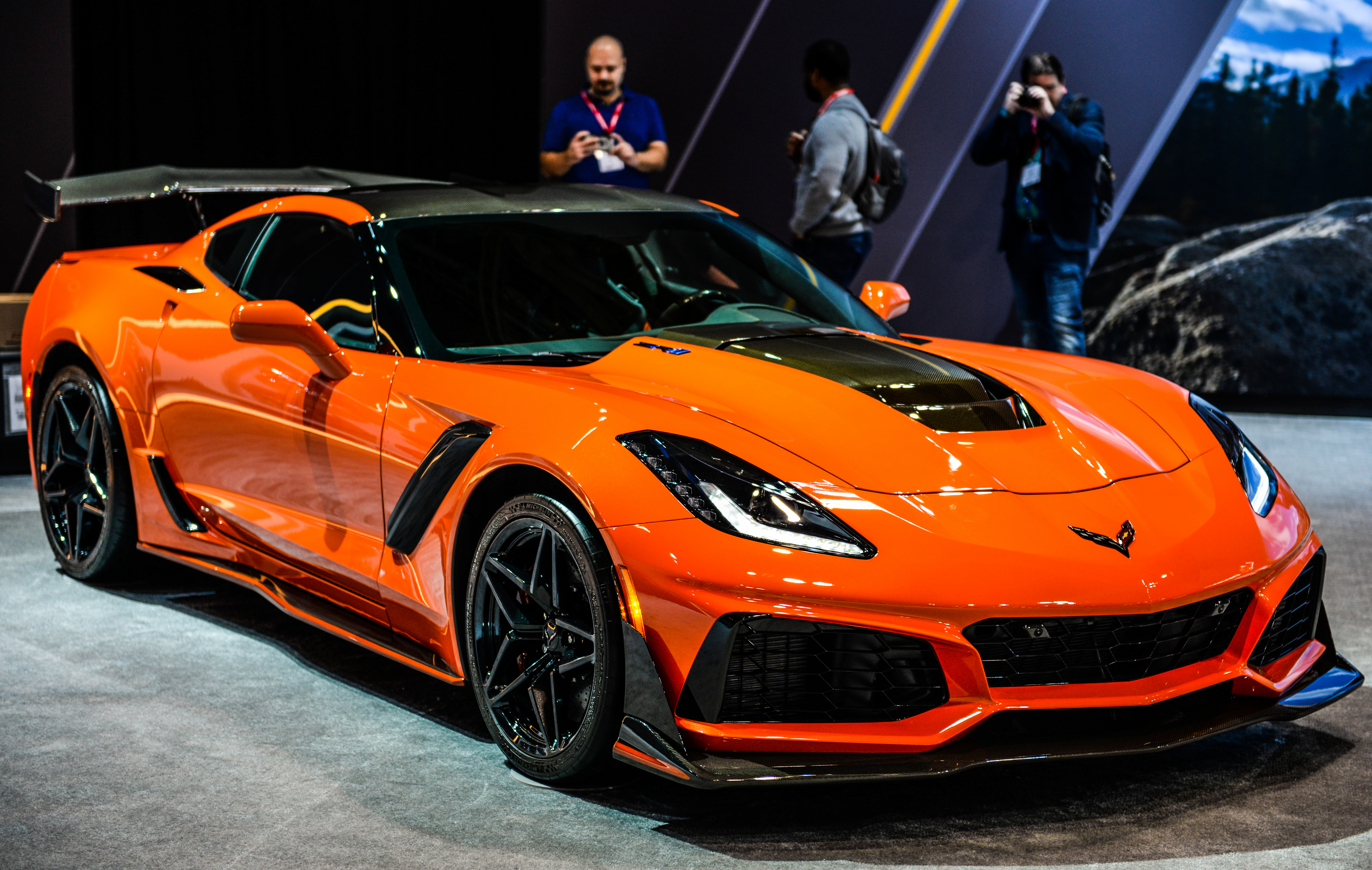
Corvette ZR1 coupé

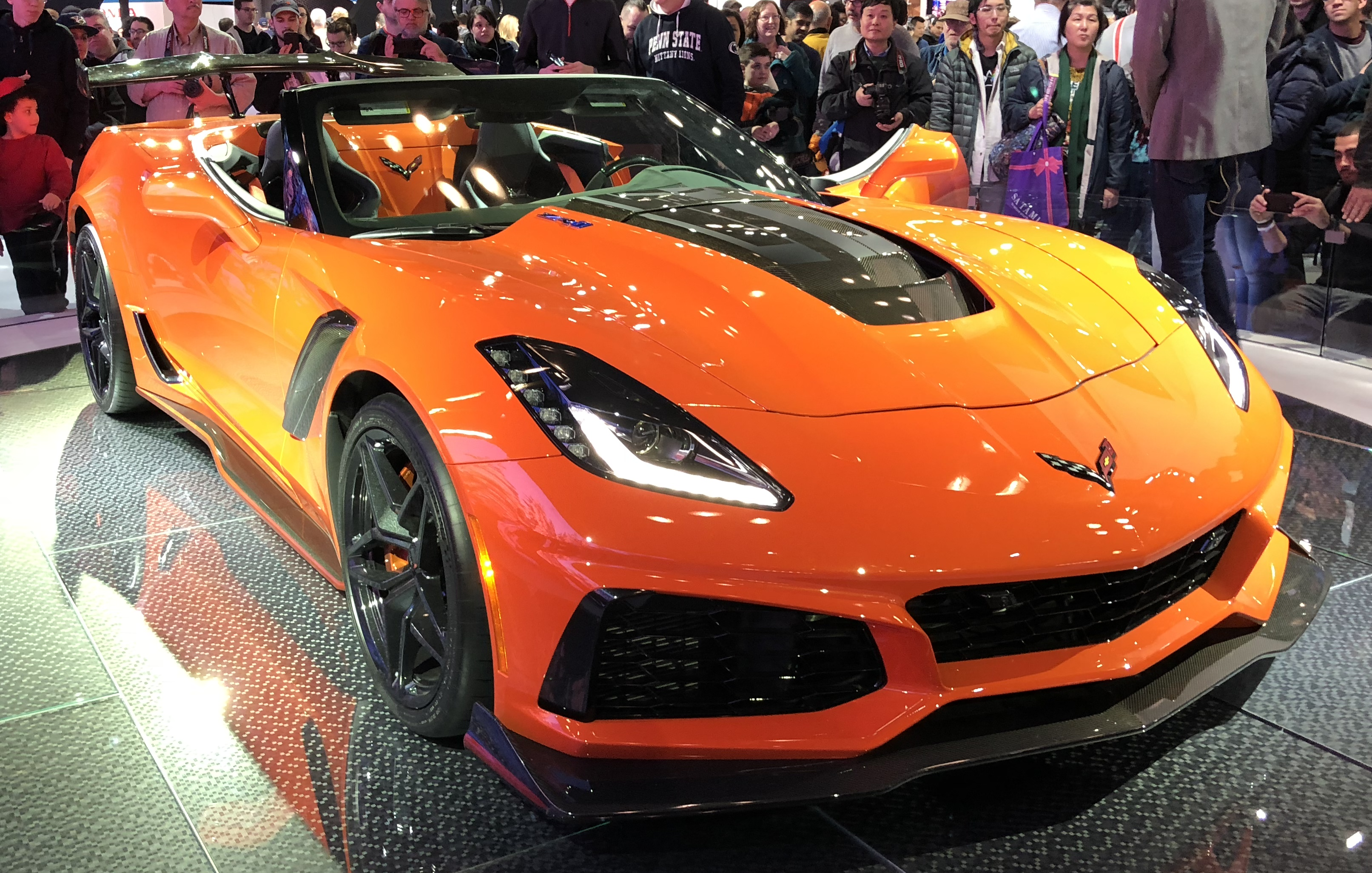
Corvette ZR1 convertible at the 2018 NYIAS

The Corvette C7 ZR1 was unveiled at the 2017 Dubai Motor Show for the 2019 model year. The ZR1 is heavily based on the Z06 platform with many noticeable changes, including the all-new 6.2 L; 376.0 cu in (6,162 cc) pushrod LT5 V8 engine equipped with a 2.6 L (0.6 imp gal; 0.7 US gal) Eaton supercharger that is 52% larger than that of the Z06 along with a new fuel injection system. The new engine is rated at 755 hp (765 PS; 563 kW) at 6,300 rpm and 715 lb⋅ft (969 N⋅m) of torque at 4,400 rpm. The ZR1 also includes an improved engine cooling system with large vents in the front bumpers and on the hood, a larger intercooler, and four more radiators, bringing the total count to thirteen.

The ZR1's aero package was developed in collaboration with Pratt & Miller's Corvette racing team in wind tunnels. It includes a large rear wing bolted directly on the chassis, a front splitter, and a new front underbody spoiler in order to balance out the excess drag. Other changes include an active exhaust system and an upgraded crankshaft, all of which help propel the car to a top speed of 214.88 mph (345.82 km/h) with the low rear wing.

The ZTK Performance Package is an optional aero package for the ZR1. It adds a higher fixed rear wing which generates 60% more downforce than the Z06 with the Z07 package, but also reduces top speed due to aerodynamic drag. The ZTK package also adds carbon fiber front splitter end caps. With the combination of the high rear wing and front underbody spoiler, the ZR1 produces 950 lb (430.9 kg) of downforce at top speed. The ZTK package also fits the ZR1 with Michelin Pilot Sport Cup 2 tires instead of the standard Michelin Super Sport tires, and specific chassis and magnetic ride control settings for better cornering.

Despite the extensive use of carbon fiber, the ZR1 is heavier than the Z06 at 3,560 lb (1,614.8 kg) due to added fluids for the cooling system. The ZR1 is available with a 7-speed Tremec TR-6070 manual transmission with rev-matching technology or an 8-speed GM 8L90 automatic transmission with paddle shifters, which are the same as those found in the Z06. The ZR1 comes with carbon ceramic brakes, double wishbone suspension system and magnetic ride control system as standard with optional brake caliper colors and wheels. The interior includes Nappa leather upholstery, heated seats, carbon fiber rimmed steering wheel and Bose sound system as standard with a variety of performance and comfort options available. The ZR1 went on sale in Q2 2018.

A convertible version of the ZR1 was unveiled at the 2017 Los Angeles Auto Show. Performance figures remain the same as the coupe, but the convertible weighs 60 lb (27 kg) more than its coupe counterpart due to structural reinforcing components.

== Racing ==
=== C7.R ===
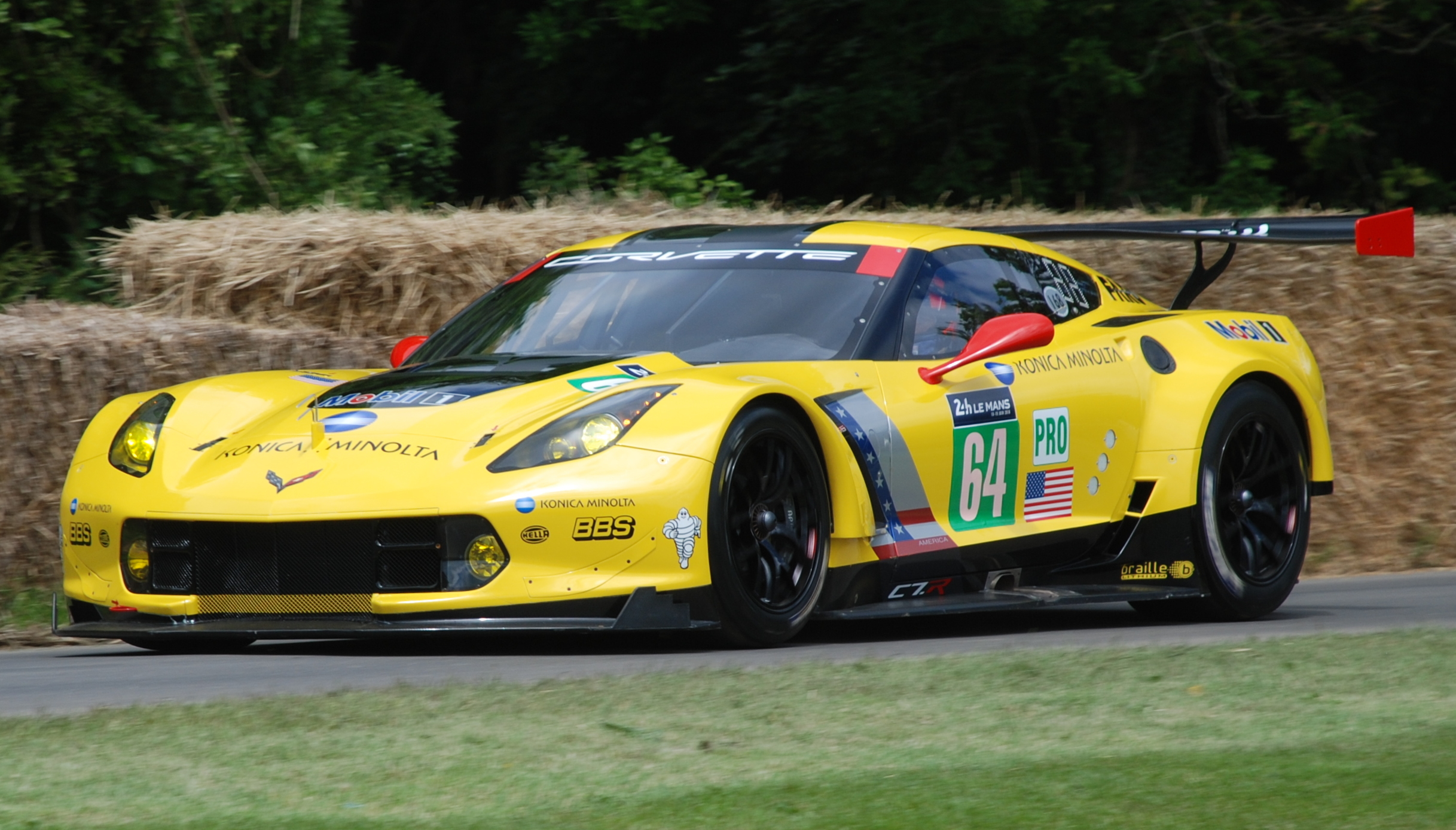
The Corvette Race Team's C7.R at the 2016 Goodwood Festival of Speed

The racing version of the 2015 Corvette Z06, called the C7.R, was unveiled at the 2014 North American International Auto Show. Modifications over the Z06 include increased cooling and aerodynamic downforce, including similar front splitters, rocker panels, and front- and rear-brake cooling ducts; a 5.5-liter LS7.R naturally aspirated V8 engine developed specifically for the C7.R having a power output of 491 hp (498 PS; 366 kW), modified suspension system to accommodate wider racing tires and larger brakes, air intake openings on each of the rear quarter panels above the brake ducts, a fixed motorsport rear wing, and larger radiator inlets.

=== C7 GT3-R ===
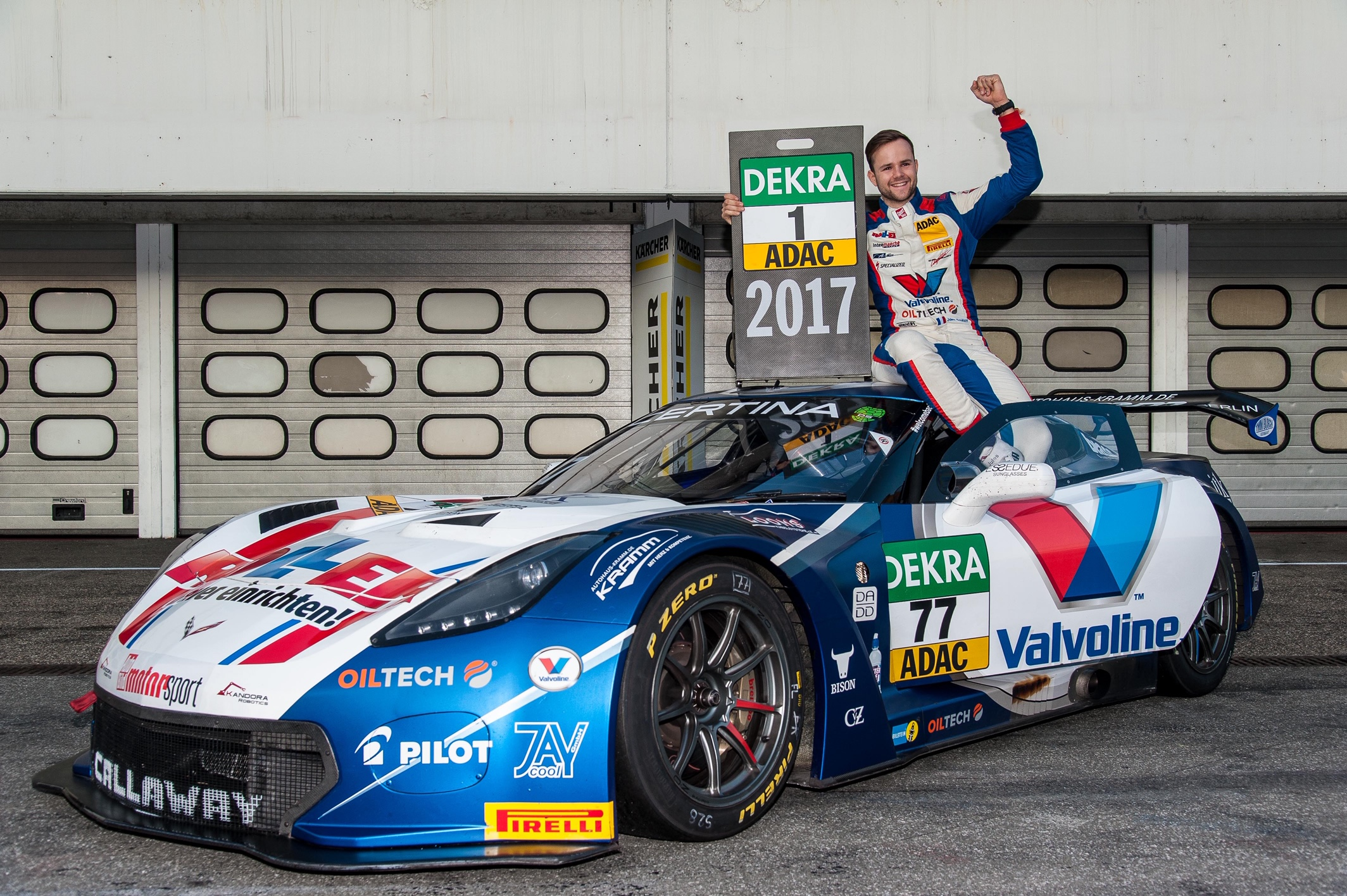
The Callaway Competition Race Team's C7 GT3-R at the 2017 ADAC GT Masters at the Hockenheimring

The C7 GT3-R (sometimes stylized as C7 GT3/R) was a GT3 adaptation of the C7 unveiled by Callaway Engineering on October 3, 2015, at the final round of the 2015 ADAC GT Masters at the Hockenheim circuit. This also marked the first time a factory-backed Corvette was built by a company other than Pratt & Miller. It uses a 6.2 L Chevrolet-based V8 engine from Dutch firm APP Racing Engines, and produces 550–600 hp (558–608 PS; 410–447 kW) and 640–680 N⋅m (472–502 lb⋅ft) depending on air restrictors, mated to a X-Trac 6-speed gearbox.

== Awards ==
- "Automobile of the Year 2014" - Automobile Magazine
- "Performance Car of the Year 2013" - Road & Track
- Finalist - Motor Trend Car of the Year
- Car and Driver's 10Best list in 2014, 2015, 2017, 2018, and 2019.

== Production totals ==
Model year	Stingray		Grand Sport		Z06		ZR1		Total	% of Total
Model year	Coupe	Conv.	Coupe	Conv.	Coupe	Conv.	Coupe	Conv.	Total	% of Total
2014	26,565	10,723							37,288	19.7%
2015	20,757	4,830			6,980	1,673			34,240	18.1%
2016	21,387	5,027			11,543	2,732			40,689	21.5%
2017	11,253	2,298	9,912	2,046	6,197	1,076			32,782	17.3%
2018	3,068	735	2,569	512	2,353	449			9,686	5.1%
2019	11,499	2,192	9,496	1,745	5,965	972	2,441	512	34,822	18.4%
Total	94,529	25,805	21,977	4,303	33,038	6,902	2,441	512	189,507	
Total Coupe	94,529		21,977		33,038		2,441		151,985	80.2%
Total Conv		25,805		4,303		6,902		512	37,522	19.8%
% of Total	63.5%		13.9%		21.1%		1.6%			
