= Tremec TR-3450 transmission =

The TREMEC TR-3450 is a 5-speed manual transmission for longitudinal engine rear-wheel drive trucks produced by TREMEC. It includes one overdrive gear, a light-weight aluminum housing, multi-cone synchronizers on first and second gear, and a synchromesh reverse gear.

== Applications ==
- 1999-2018 Chevrolet Silverado C1500 and C2500 (Mexican market)
- 2000-2004 Dodge Ram 1500 and 2500 (Mexican market)
