= Composite gear housing =

Composite gear housing refers to the use of composite materials to enclose the components of motor transmissions. Fiber reinforced composite materials are used primarily for weight reduction. Carbon fiber reinforced plastic material is commonly used in the aerospace and automotive industries.

== Design ==
The main problems of using fiber-reinforced plastic for gear housings are low thermal conductivity and low hardness of the composite material. Because of the low hardness, the composite gear housing requires numerous metal inserts laminated into the composite exterior or installed with adhesive in the prefabricated composite housing. High strength epoxy adhesives are used in fabrication of carbon fiber composite drive shafts for cars.

The metal inserts provide support for bearings, shafts, gears and other metal components of the gearbox. The composite gear housing does not remove heat as efficiently as an aluminum or magnesium housing. Composite gear housings require more expensive and reliable cooling systems. However, composite plastic material is widely used on low-power applications such as gear motors for electromechanical actuators. Lightly loaded rotary gear actuators can be completely made of composite plastic material. Such electromechanical rotary actuators are installed, for example, on power windows of automobiles. Higher loaded actuators can contain metallic gears inside plastic composite housing for reduction of cost and corrosion resistance.

== History ==
In 1969 General Motors investigated using composite transmission cases to reduce manufacturing cost.

John Barnard tried to incorporate this material in a gear housing for the Ferrari F1 car in 1994, but instead only mounted the metal gear case on a carbon fiber composite support. Since then several F1 teams including both Honda (née B.A.R) and McLaren have raced 'Carbon' cases with substantial composite content.

In 2004 the US Department of Defense decided to finance development of a composite gear housing for a main rotor helicopter planetary gear box. Boeing and Sikorsky currently conduct the development of helicopter composite gear housing.

== Patents and Methods ==
Gear Mechanic Corporation has developed controlled bonding methods and mathematical simulation methods for three-dimensional filament wound composite structures used in mechanical systems. The method provides optimized fiber placement and increased strength of bonding between metal inserts and fiber reinforced plastics for metal/composite power transmission components in different applications.

Snap-on Incorporated has patented a concept of a composite ring gear, which incorporates a metal gear insert bonded into a fiber reinforced composite plastic housing. Invented by Snap-on Incorporated, composite ring gear has been already successfully applied to mechanical engineering area. More specifically Snap-on is producing a gear mechanical system commonly known as ratchet wrench handle, which incorporates Snap-on composite ring gear as the key element of the system.

Internationally patented Composite Structural Members provides slightly different engineering solution for bonding of structural inserts into composite plastic material. If Snap-on invention utilizes oriented and randomly oriented reinforced fibers for constructing the ring gear housing, the Composite Structural Members patent offers a solution for using filament winding material.

== Aerospace ==
Composite gear transmission housing for aerospace is in development stage under the Advanced Rotorcraft Transmission program. ART program is a joint Army/NASA program to develop and demonstrate lightweight, quiet, durable drivetrain systems for next generation rotorcraft. Sikorsky Aircraft and Boeing participate in ART program.(NASA –TM -103276 published report CSCL 13T, Technical memorandum 103276). By NASA report, Sikorsky applied composite material for CH-53E helicopter gear housing, load truss, and main rotor quill shaft. "Major weight saving can be realized through the application of composite structural material. The ACA transmission design of Sikorsky Aircraft is particularly amenable to incorporation of composites because of geometric simplicity of the housing. It is estimated that application of lightweight composites to the gear transmission results in 700 to 800 lb weight reduction compare to baseline materials."

Sikorsky aircraft has widely advertised its progress on developing of composite gear housing for aerospace application. On 24–26 June 1991, in Sacramento, CA, Sikorsky Aircraft has presented a photograph of its composite gear housing. Sikorsky used graphite-epoxy material for manufacturing of composite gear housing. The composite gear housing was manufactured with bearing interfaces identical to the original steel housing; sic "therefore the internal components will fit into the housing."

In 1992 NASA continued advertising composite materials for use in aviation gear mechanical systems. During the AIAA/SEA/ASME/ASEE conference in Nashville, TN, 6–8 July 1992, NASA published a picture describing one of proposed design embodiment of composite gear housing for an aircraft.

In its permanent effort to promote use of lightweight composite materials on aircraft NASA has solicited a contract for development of 21st century rotorcraft gear drive system commonly known as RDS-21 (Rotorcraft Drive System 21) The program is directed by the U.S. Army Applied Aviation Technology Directorate (AATD) Boeing was awarded to participate in this program. While the face gears are the big portion of this program, fiber reinforced composite materials will be used as well. As it stated in a joint NASA-Boeing publication the new aircraft gearbox will incorporate composite shafting and structural housing.

== See also ==
- Composite materials
- Carbon fiber reinforced polymer
