= Housing (engineering) =

Enclosure for a mechanism, electronic circuit, etc.

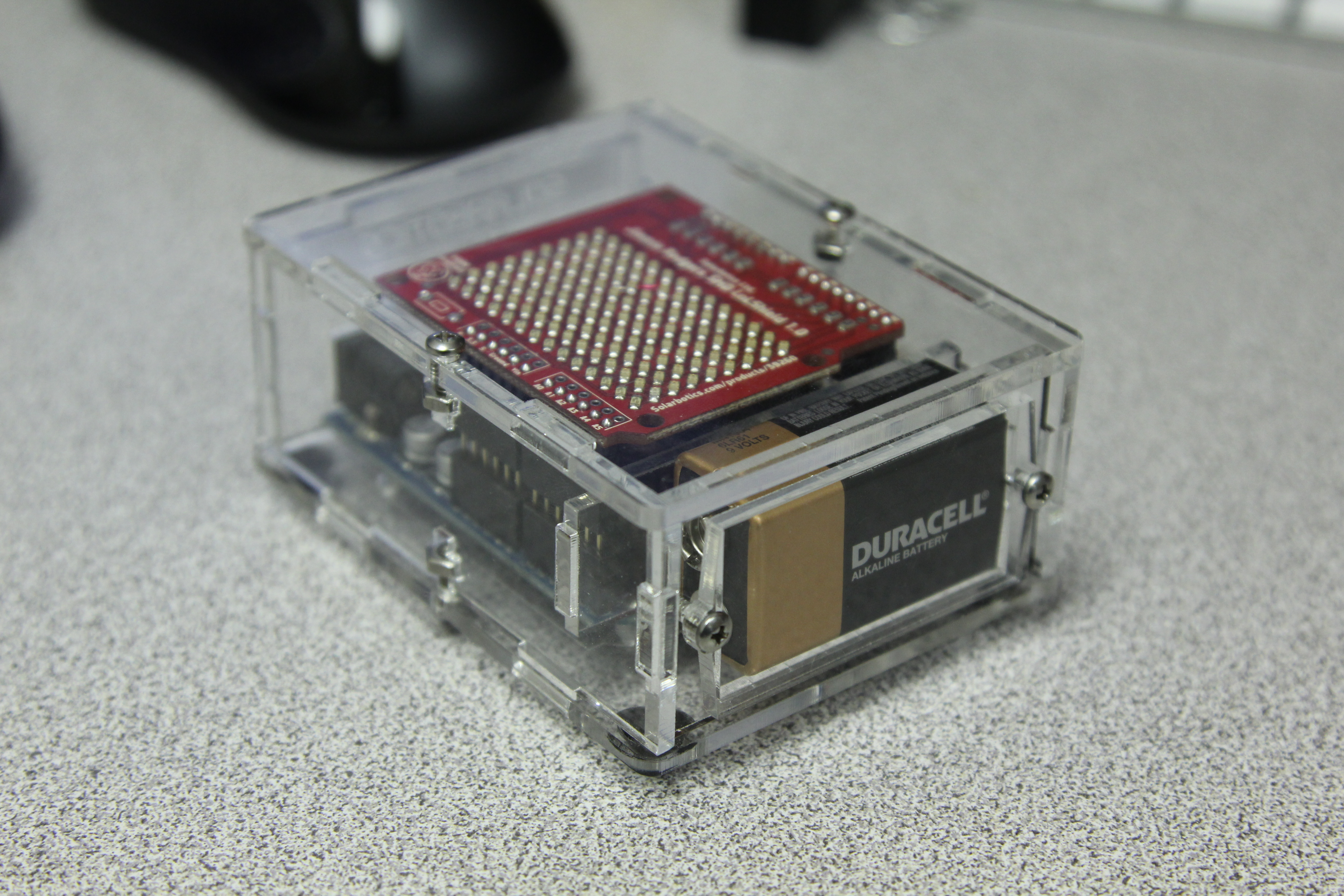
A transparent plastic housing around an electronic device

In engineering, a housing or enclosure is a container, a protective exterior (e.g. shell) or an enclosing structural element (e.g. chassis or exoskeleton) designed to enable easier handling, provide attachment points for internal mechanisms (e.g. mounting brackets for electrical components, cables and pipings), maintain cleanliness of the contents by shielding dirt/dust, fouling and other contaminations, or protect interior mechanisms (e.g. delicate integrated electrical fittings) from structural stress and/or potential physical, thermal, chemical, biological or radiational damages from the surrounding environment. Housing may also be the body of a device, vital to its function.

== Description ==
Housing is an exterior case or enclosure used to protect an interior mechanism. The housing prevents the interior mechanism from being fouled by outside debris. It may also have integrated fittings or brackets to keep internal components in place; sometimes a housing is the body of the device, vital to its function.

== Design ==
Housings are most commonly made of metal or plastic. The design of housing is specific to the item and its use. Housing may provide a number of functions.

=== Contamination control ===
Housing prevents the interior mechanism from being fouled by outside debris. Housings are sometimes made watertight, especially when the interior mechanisms contain electronics.

=== Containment ===
Housings are commonly used to protect gearboxes, where the housing also is responsible for containing the lubricant. Housings can also play a safety role, by providing a barrier between people and dangerous or fast-moving mechanisms.

=== Interface ===
Housing may need to provide a user interface for the internal devices, such as for televisions and video game controllers.

=== Decoration ===
Housing may include decorative elements. When these elements are removable and replaceable panels, they may be known as faceplates. Interchangeable faceplates provide a method to update the cosmetics of the housing without replacing the entire enclosure.

== See also ==
- Enclosure (electrical)
- PC case
- Gear housing
- Junction box, a housing for electrical components
- Electronic packaging
