= Tremec TR-3650 transmission =

5-speed manual transmission for automobiles

The TREMEC TR-3650 is a 5-speed manual transmission for longitudinal engine automobiles. It includes a 5th gear that functions as an overdrive gear, light-weight aluminum housings, a synchromesh reverse gear, and synchromeshed helical cut forward gears. It is manufactured by Transmission Technologies Corporation and is rated for 360 lbf⋅ft (490 N⋅m) of torque. The loss in power transmission efficiency is rated at approximately 16% in 4th gear for a 2005–2010 Ford Mustang GT.

== Gear Ratios ==
TR-3650 used in the 2001-2004 Ford Mustang GT

- 1st: 3.380:1
- 2nd: 2.000:1
- 3rd: 1.320:1
- 4th: 1.000:1
- 5th: 0.670:1 (used in 2001 with GT, Bullitt and Cobra)
- 5th: 0.620:1 (used in 02-04 with GT and Mach 1)
- Rev: 3.380:1

Note that in the other TR-3650 applications, the 5th gear ratio is also available with 0.68(05-10 with 3.55:1 final drive) and 0.74.

In 2002 Ford Australia's vehicle were fitted with the following ratios:

- 1st 3.37:1
- 2nd 2.00:1
- 3rd 1.32:1
- 4th 1.00:1
- 5th 0.62:1
- Reverse 3.77:1

== Recommended Oil and Fill Capacity ==
TREMEC engineers have recommended Texaco-Havoline Dexron III/Mercon Non-Synthetic ATF. There has been a significant amount of confusion regarding the proper capacity and proper type of ATF for the TR-3650 which may have a correlation with a rather large number of complaints about notchy shifting, shift "nibbling", noisy synchros, and grinding gears. The 2007 Mustang GT owner's manual specified the use of 3.0 L of non-synthetic Mercon ATF in the 3650, while the 2008 Mustang GT owner's manual now specifies the use of 3.0 L of Mercon-V ATF in the 3650. Dexron III/Mercon Non-Synthetic ATF seems to work best for pre-2005 Mustang GTs. NB: Tremec service manual also specifies Mobil 1 Synthetic ATF ( Tremec specification ET-M-99 ) in addition to Dexron III.

Note that Tremec engineers have also recommended GM Synchromesh as the transmission fluid.

Note Mal Wood Automotive, an official authorised Tremec distributor in Australia, have consistently recommended use of Castrol Transmax Z for use in the Australia Ford vehicles.

== Applications ==
- 2001 Ford Mustang Cobra, top-loading shifter.
- 2001 Ford Mustang Bullitt
- 2001-2004 Ford Mustang GT, top-loading shifter.
- 2002 Ford Tickford Experience AU Series 3 TE50
- 2002 Ford Tickford Experience AU Series 3 TS50
- 2002 Ford AU Series 3 Falcon XR8 Pursuit 250
- 2003-2004 Ford Mustang Mach 1
- 2002-2003 Ford Falcon BA
- 2003-2005 MG ZT 260
- 2005–2010 Ford Mustang GT, Bullitt, remote mounted shifter (TCET5757)
