= Gear housing =

Casing that surrounds the mechanical components of a gear box

The gear housing is a mechanical housing that surrounds the mechanical components of a gear box. It provides mechanical support for the moving components, protection from the outside world for those internal components, and a fluid-tight container to hold the lubricant that bathes those components.

== Types of housings ==
A split housing is like a walnut shell, the housing is divided in two parts, with a lower part that ties down the Gear Box to the structure, supports all the components during the assembly stage and holds the lubrication oil; and the upper part that completes the enclosure and provides mechanical integrity to the housing. The upper and lower parts of the housing have a mating surface that seals perfectly to the housing to avoid oil leaks and fatigue of the housing.

A bathtub housing is made on a single piece and has a top opening for servicing the gear box and side opening to accommodate the bearing housing associated to the gear shafts. Associated with less lubricant leakage but is more difficult to assemble and repair.

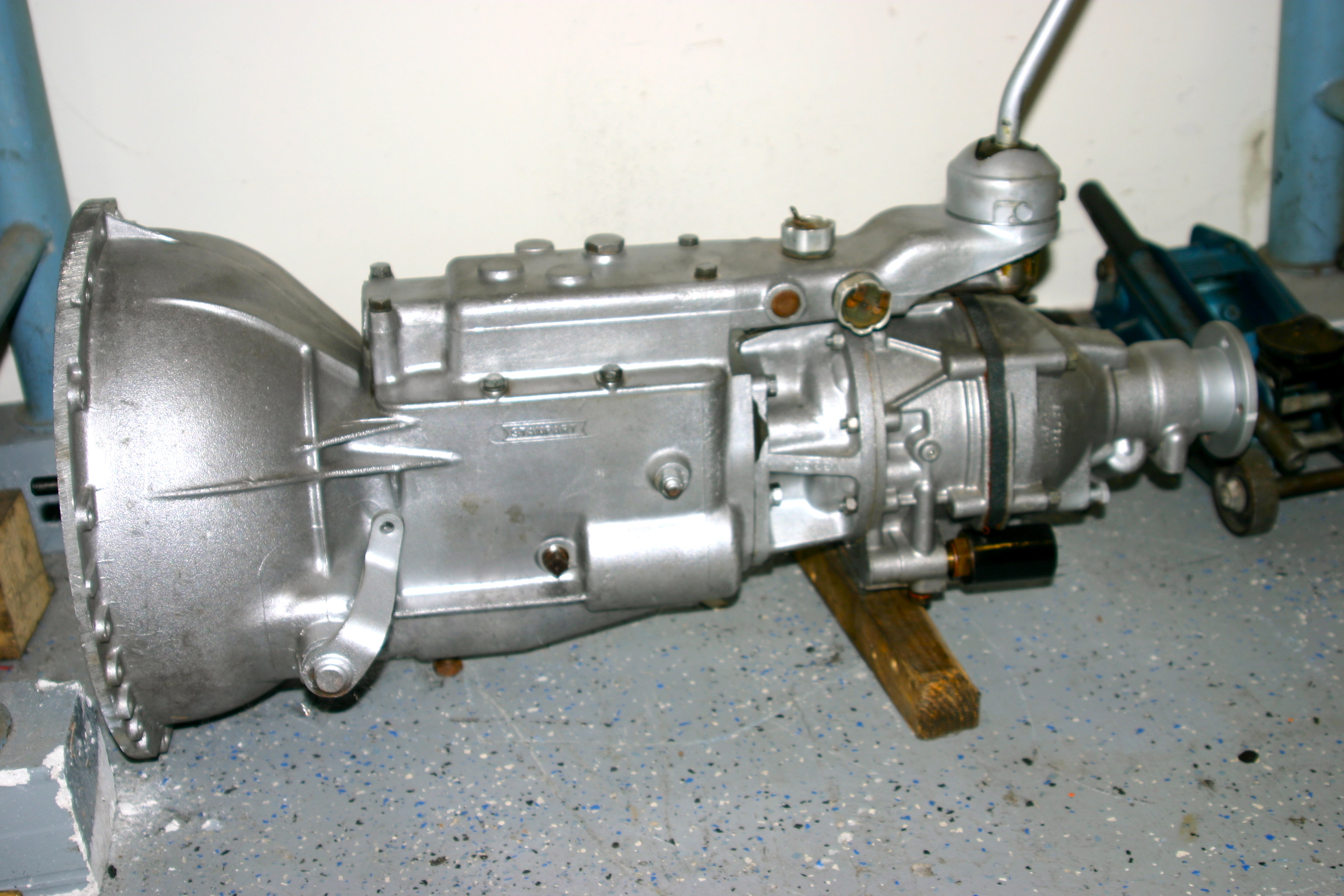
Housing for a Triumph gearbox.

== Methods of manufacture ==
Traditionally a gearbox casing is made from cast iron or cast aluminium, using methods of permanent mold casting or shell molding. Experimentally, though, composite materials have also been used.

== See also ==
- Overdrive (mechanics)
- Spiral bevel gear
- Ford Type 9 transmission
- Tremec TR-3650 transmission

== Bibliography ==
- Todd, Robert H.; Allen, Dell K.; Alting, Leo (1994), Manufacturing Processes Reference Guide, Industrial Press Inc., ISBN 0-8311-3049-0
- Degarmo, E. Paul; Black, J. T.; Kohser, Ronald A. (2003), Materials and Processes in Manufacturing (9th ed.), Wiley, ISBN 0-471-65653-4
