= GM 8L transmission =

8-speed automatic from 2014

8L 45 · 8L 90 · 8L 80

Overview
- Manufacturer: General Motors
- Production: 2014–present

Body and chassis
- Class: 8-speed longitudinal automatic transmission
- Related: ZF 8HP · Aisin-Toyota 8-speed · MB 9G-Tronic

Chronology
- Predecessor: 6L 45 · 6L 50 · 6L 80 · 6L 90
- Successor: 10L 80 · 10L 90 · 10L 1000

The 8L is the first 8-speed automatic transmission built by General Motors. All 8L transmissions are based on the same globally patented gearset concept as the ZF 8HP from 2008 and, like this, are designed for longitudinal engine installation and features a hydraulic (Hydramatic) design. While fully retaining the same gearset logic, they differ only in the patented arrangement of the components, with planetary gearsets 1 and 3 swapped.

== History ==
=== 2014: 8L 90 M5U ===
The 8L 90 was introduced in 2014 and is designed to be either attached to the front-located engine with a standard bell housing or mounted in the rear of the car adjacent to the differential (as in the Corvette).

=== 2015: 8L 45 M5N ===
The 8L 45 is the smaller variant and was launched in 2015 in the 2016 Cadillac CT6. It is always attached to the front-located engine with a standard bell housing. It shares much with the 8L 90 transmission. Estimated weight savings over the heavier-duty 8L 90 is 33 lb (15 kg).

=== 2023: 8L 80 MFC/N8X and 8L 45 N8R ===
The 8L 80 is an updated version with new RPO codes MFC and N8X and was introduced on the 2023 model years of the Chevrolet Colorado and GMC Canyon. A second generation of the 8L 45 was introduced in 2023 model years with a new RPO code N8R.

== Key data ==
Gear ratios (Note: Differences in gear ratios have a measurable, direct impact on vehicle dynamics, performance, waste emissions as well as fuel mileage)
Model	Type	First Delivery	Gear									Total Span			Avg. Step	Components		Nomenclature			
Model	Type	First Delivery	R	1	2	3	4	5	6	7	8	Nomi- nal	Effec- tive	Cen- ter	Avg. Step	Total	per Gear (Note: Forward gears only)	Gears Count	Cou- pling	Gear- sets	Maximum Input Torque
8L 90 · 8L 80	M5U · MFC+N8X	2014 · 2023	−3.818	4.560	2.971	2.075	1.688	1.270	1.000	0.845	0.652	6.999	5.860	1.724	1.320	4 Gearsets; 2 Brakes; 3 Clutches	1.125	8	L (Note: Installation: Longitudinal engine)		900 N⋅m (664 lb⋅ft)
8L 45	M5N · N8R	2015 · 2023	−3.928	4.615	3.038	2.065	1.658	1.259	1.000	0.849	0.658	7.011	5.966	1.743	1.321	4 Gearsets; 2 Brakes; 3 Clutches	1.125	8	L		500 N⋅m (369 lb⋅ft)
ZF 8HP 70 (Note: first transmission to use this 8-speed gearset concept. It has become the new benchmark for automatic transmissions)		2008	−3.297	4.696	3.130	2.104	1.667	1.285	1.000	0.839	0.667	7.043	4.945	1.769	1.322	4 Gearsets; 2 Brakes; 3 Clutches	1.125	8	H (Note: Hydraulic torque converter · German: Hydraulischer Wandler oder Drehmomentwandler)	P (Note: Planetary gearing · German: Planetenradsätze)	400 N⋅m (295 lb⋅ft) – 750 N⋅m (553 lb⋅ft)

== Specifications ==
Features
	8L 45 M5N + N8R	8L 90 M5U 8L 80 MFC + N8X
Input capacity
Maximum engine power	308 bhp (230 kW) (Note: based on 2020 Chevrolet Colorado Z71 2WD Crew Cab · Short Bed)	420 bhp (313 kW) (Note: General Motors estimate)
Maximum gearbox torque	550 N⋅m (406 lb⋅ft)	900 N⋅m (664 lb⋅ft)
Maximum shaft speed	7,500/min	6,000/min
Vehicle
Maximum validated weight Gross vehicle weight · GVW	—	—
Maximum validated weight Gross curb vehicle weight · GCVW	12,000 lb (5,440 kg)	22,500 lb (10,210 kg)
Sundry
Range-selector quadrant	P · R · N · D · M · L	
Case description	2-piece main, bell integrated with main	
Case material	Die cast aluminum	
Shift pattern (2)	2 on/off solenoids	
Shift quality	6 variable force solenoids · 1 for each clutch · 1 for TCC	
Torque converter clutch	Variable force solenoid ECCC · 2 path · turbine damper	
Converter size	238 mm (9.37 in)	258 mm (10.16 in)
Fluid type	DEXRON high performance ATF	
Fluid capacity	10.8 L (11.4 US qt)	10.3 L (10.9 US qt)
Weight	80 kg (176 lb)	98.9 kg (218 lb)
Available control features
Shift patterns	Multiple (selectable)	
Driver shift control	Tap up and down	
Additional modes	Tow & haul mode (selectable)	
Engine torque management	On all shifts	
Shift control	Automatic start/stop Automatic grade braking	
Assembly sites	GMPT (Note: General Motors Powertrain) Toledo · Ohio · USA; GMPT Silao · Mexico	

== Planetary gearset concept ==
=== Improved fuel economy ===
The main objective in replacing the predecessor model was to improve vehicle fuel economy with extra speeds and a wider gear span to allow the engine speed level to be lowered (downspeeding), which is a decisive factor in improving energy efficiency and thus reducing fuel consumption. In addition, the lower engine speed level improves the noise-vibration-harshness comfort and the exterior noise is reduced. Due to changes in internal design, the shift times are reduced to 0.2 seconds.

=== Reduced manufacturing complexity ===
In order to avoid a further increase in manufacturing complexity while expanding the number of gear ratios, ZF and consequently GM switched from the conventional design method—in which the planetary gearset concept was limited to a purely serial or in-line power flow—to a more modern design method that utilizes a planetary gearset concept with combined parallel and serial power flow. This was only possible thanks to computer-aided design and has resulted in a globally patented gearset concept. The resulting progress is reflected in a better ratio of the number of gears to the number of components used compared to existing layouts. The 8HP has become the new reference standard (benchmark) for automatic transmissions.

Planetary gearset concept: manufacturing complexity (Note: Progress increases cost-effectiveness and is reflected in the ratio of forward gears to main components. It depends on the power flow: parallel: using the two degrees of freedom of planetary gearsets; to increase the number of gears; with unchanged number of components; serial: in-line combined planetary gearsets without using the two degrees of freedom; to increase the number of gears; a corresponding increase in the number of components is unavoidable)
With Assessment	Output: Gear Ratios	Innovation Elasticity (Note: Innovation elasticity classifies progress and market position: Automobile manufacturers drive forward technical developments primarily in order to remain competitive or to achieve or defend technological leadership. This technical progress has therefore always been subject to economic constraints; Only innovations whose relative additional benefit is greater than the relative additional resource input, i.e. whose economic elasticity is greater than 1, are considered for realization; The required innovation elasticity of an automobile manufacturer depends on its expected return on investment. The basic assumption that the relative additional benefit must be at least twice as high as the relative additional resource input helps with orientation; negative, if the output increases and the input decreases, is perfect; 2 or above is good; 1 or above is acceptable (red); below this is unsatisfactory (bold)) Δ Output : Δ Input	Input: Main Components			
With Assessment	Output: Gear Ratios	Innovation Elasticity Δ Output : Δ Input	Total	Gearsets	Brakes	Clutches
8L Ref. Object	$n_{O1}$ $n_{O2}$	Topic	$n_I= n_G+$ $n_B+ n_C$	$n_{G1}$ $n_{G2}$	$n_{B1}$ $n_{B2}$	$n_{C1}$ $n_{C2}$
Δ Number	$n_{O1}- n_{O2}$	Topic	$n_{I1}- n_{I2}$	$n_{G1}- n_{G2}$	$n_{B1}- n_{B2}$	$n_{C1}- n_{C2}$
Relative Δ	Δ Output $\tfrac{n_{O1}- n_{O2}} {n_{O2}}$	$\tfrac{n_{O1}- n_{O2}} {n_{O2}}: \tfrac{n_{I1}- n_{I2}} {n_{I2}}$ $=\tfrac{n_{O1}- n_{O2}} {n_{O2}}$·$\tfrac{n_{I2}} {n_{I1}- n_{I2}}$	Δ Input $\tfrac{n_{I1}- n_{I2}} {n_{I2}}$	$\tfrac{n_{G1}- n_{G2}} {n_{G2}}$	$\tfrac{n_{B1}- n_{B2}} {n_{B2}}$	$\tfrac{n_{C1}- n_{C2}} {n_{C2}}$
8L 6L (Note: Direct predecessor: To reflect the progress of the specific model change)	8 (Note: plus 1 reverse gear); 6	Progress	9; 8	4; 3 (Note: of which 2 gearsets are combined as a compound Ravigneaux gearset)	2; 2	3; 3
Δ Number	2	Progress	1	1	0	0
Relative Δ	0.333 $\tfrac{1} {3}$	2.667 $\tfrac{1} {3}: \tfrac{1} {8}= \tfrac{1} {3}$·$\tfrac{8} {1}= \tfrac{8} {3}$	0.125 $\tfrac{1} {8}$	0.333 $\tfrac{1} {3}$	0.000 $\tfrac{0} {2}$	0.000 $\tfrac{0} {3}$
8L ZF 8HP (Note: Current reference standard (benchmark): The 8HP has become the new reference standard (benchmark) for automatic transmissions)	8; 8	Current Market Position	9; 9	4; 4	2; 2	3; 3
Δ Number	0	Current Market Position	0	0	0	0
Relative Δ	0.000 $\tfrac{0} {8}$	0.000 $\tfrac{0} {8}: \tfrac{0} {9}= \tfrac{0} {8}$·$\tfrac{9} {0}= \tfrac{0} {0}$	0.000 $\tfrac{0} {9}$	0.000 $\tfrac{0} {4}$	0.000 $\tfrac{0} {2}$	0.000 $\tfrac{0} {3}$
8L 3-Speed (Note: Historical reference standard (benchmark): 3-speed transmissions with torque converters have established the modern market for automatic transmissions and thus made it possible in the first place, as this design proved to be a particularly successful compromise between cost and performance; It became the archetype and dominated the world market for around 3 decades, setting the standard for automatic transmissions. It was only when fuel consumption became the focus of interest that this design reached its limits, which is why it has now completely disappeared from the market; What has remained is the orientation that it offers as a reference standard (point of reference, benchmark) for this market for determining progressiveness and thus the market position of all other, later designs; All transmission variants consist of 7 main components; Typical examples are; Turbo-Hydramatic from GM; Cruise-O-Matic from Ford; TorqueFlite from Chrysler; Detroit Gear from BorgWarner for Studebaker; BW-35 from BorgWarner and as T35 from Aisin; 3N 71 from Nissan/Jatco; 3 HP from ZF Friedrichshafen; W3A 040 and W3B 050 from Mercedes-Benz)	8; 3	Historical Market Position	9; 7	4; 2	2; 3	3; 2
Δ Number	5	Historical Market Position	2	2	–1	1
Relative Δ	1.667 $\tfrac{5} {3}$	5.833 $\tfrac{5} {3}: \tfrac{2} {7}= \tfrac{5} {3}$·$\tfrac{7} {2}= \tfrac{35} {6}$	0.286 $\tfrac{2} {7}$	1.000 $\tfrac{1} {1}$	−0.333 $\tfrac{-1} {3}$	0.500 $\tfrac{1} {2}$

=== Quality ===
The ratios of the 8 gears are relatively unevenly distributed in all versions. Particularly noticeable are the too small step between 3rd and 4th gear and the too large one between 7th and 8th gear. This cannot be eliminated without affecting all other gear ratios. On the other hand the selected gearset concept offers 2 to 3 gears more than conventional transmissions of comparable manufacturing costs, which more than compensates for the weaknesses.

Additionally, the layout brings the ability to shift in a non-sequential manner – going from gear 8 to gear 2 in extreme situations simply by changing one shift element (actuating brake B and releasing clutch D).

Planetary gearset concept: gear ratio quality (Note: All 8L-transmissions are based on a dedicated 8-speed layout, first realized in the ZF 8HP 70 gearbox) (Note: Revised 14 January 2026 Nomenclature: $S_n =$ sun gear: number of teeth; $R_n =$ ring gear: number of teeth; $\color{gray}{C_n = }$ carrier or planetary gear carrier (not needed); $s_n =$ sun gear: shaft speed; $r_n =$ ring gear: shaft speed; $c_n =$ carrier or planetary gear carrier: shaft speed; With $n =$ gear is: $i_n =$ gear ratio or transmission ratio; $\omega_{1;n} = \omega_t =$ shaft speed shaft 1: input (turbine) shaft; $\omega_{2;n} =$ shaft speed shaft 2: output shaft; $T_{1;n} = T_t =$ torque shaft 1: input (turbine) shaft; $T_{2;n} =$ torque shaft 2: output shaft; $\mu_n =$ torque ratio or torque conversion ratio; $\eta_n =$ efficiency; $i_0 =$ stationary gear ratio; $\eta_0 =$ (assumed) stationary gear efficiency)
In-Depth Analysis (Note: Gear ratio (transmission ratio) $i_n$ — speed conversion —: The gear ratio $i_n$ is the ratio of; input shaft speed $\omega_{1;n}$; to output shaft speed $\omega_{2;n}$; and therefore corresponds to the reciprocal of the shaft speeds; $i_n = \frac{1} {\frac{\omega_{2;n}} {\omega_{1;n}}} = \frac{\omega_{1;n}} {\omega_{2;n}} = \frac{\omega_t} {\omega_{2;n}}$) With Assessment And Torque Ratio (Note: Torque ratio (rorque conversion ratio) $\mu_n$ — torque conversion —: The torque ratio $\mu_n$ is the ratio of; output torque $T_{2;n}$; to input torque $T_{1;n}$; minus efficiency losses; and therefore corresponds (apart from the efficiency losses) to the reciprocal of the shaft speeds too; $\mu_n = i_n \eta_{n;\eta_0} = \frac{\omega_{1;n} \eta_{n;\eta_0}} {\omega_{2;n}} = \frac{T_{2;n} \eta_{n;\eta_0}} {T_{1;n}}$; whereby $\eta_{n;\eta_0}$ may vary from gear to gear according to the formulas listed in this table and $0 \le \eta_{n;\eta_0} \le 1$) And Efficiency Calculation (Note: Efficiency: The efficiency $\eta_n$ is calculated; from the torque ratio; in relation to the gear ratio (transmission ratio); $\eta_n = \frac{\mu_n} {i_n}$; Power loss for single meshing gears; is in the range of 1 % to 1.5 %; helical gear pairs, which are used to reduce noise in passenger cars, are in the upper part of the loss range; spur gear pairs, which are limited to commercial vehicles due to their poorer noise comfort, are in the lower part of the loss range; Corridor for torque ratio and efficiency: in planetary gearsets, the stationary gear ratio $i_0$ is formed via the planetary gears and thus by two meshes; for reasons of simplification, the efficiency for both meshes together is commonly specified there; the efficiencies $\eta_0$ specified here are based on assumed efficiencies for the stationary ratio $i_0$; of $\eta_0 = 0.9800$ (upper value); and $\eta_0 = 0.9700$ (lower value); for both interventions together; The corresponding efficiency; for single-meshing gear pairs is ${\eta_0}^\tfrac {1}{2}$; at $0.9800^\tfrac{1} {2} = 0.98995$ (upper value); and $0.9700^\tfrac{1} {2} = 0.98489$ (lower value))			Planetary Gearset: Teeth (Note: Layout: Input and output are on opposite sides; Planetary gearset 1 is on the input (turbine) side; Input (turbine) shafts are C_{2} and, if actuated, R_{3} and S_{4}; Output shaft is C_{4})				Count	Nomi- nal (Note: Total ratio span (total gear ratio/total transmission ratio) nominal: $\frac{\omega_{2;n}} {\omega_{2;1}} = \frac{\frac{\omega_{2;n}} {\omega_{2;1} \omega_{2;n}}} {\frac{\omega_{2;1}} {\omega_{2;1} \omega_{2;n}}} = \frac{\frac{1} {\omega_{2;1}}} {\frac{1} {\omega_{2;n}}} = \frac{\frac{\omega_t} {\omega_{2;1}}} {\frac{\omega_t} {\omega_{2;n}}} = \frac{i_1} {i_n}$; A wider span enables the; downspeeding when driving outside the city limits; increase the climbing ability; when driving over mountain passes or off-road; or when towing a trailer) Effec- tive (Note: Total ratio span (total gear ratio/total transmission ratio) effective: $\frac{\omega_{2;n}} {max(\omega_{2;1};|\omega_{2;R}|)} = \frac{min(i_1;|i_R|)} {i_n}$; The span is only effective to the extent that; the reverse gear ratio; matches that of 1st gear; see also Standard R:1; Digression Reverse gear: is usually longer than 1st gear; the effective span is therefore of central importance for describing the suitability of a transmission; because in these cases, the nominal spread conveys a misleading picture; which is only unproblematic for vehicles with high specific power; Market participants: Manufacturers naturally have no interest in specifying the effective span; Users have not yet formulated the practical benefits that the effective span has for them; The effective span has not yet played a role in research and teaching; Contrary to its significance: the effective span has therefore not yet been able to establish itself; either in theory; or in practice.; End of digression)	Cen- ter (Note: Ratio span's center: $(i_1 i_n)^\frac{1} {2}$; The center indicates the speed level of the transmission; Together with the final drive ratio; it gives the shaft speed level of the vehicle)
In-Depth Analysis With Assessment And Torque Ratio And Efficiency Calculation			Planetary Gearset: Teeth				Count	Nomi- nal Effec- tive	Avg. (Note: Average gear step: $\left( \frac{\omega_{2;n}} {\omega_{2;1}} \right) ^\frac{1} {n-1} = \left( \frac{i_1} {i_n} \right) ^\frac{1} {n-1}$; There are $n-1$ gear steps between $n$ gears; with decreasing step width; the gears connect better to each other; shifting comfort increases)
Model Type	Version First Delivery		S_{1} (Note: Sun 1: sun gear of gearset 1) R_{1} (Note: Ring 1: ring gear of gearset 1)	S_{2} (Note: Sun 2: sun gear of gearset 2) R_{2} (Note: Ring 2: ring gear of gearset 2)	S_{3} (Note: Sun 3: sun gear of gearset 3) R_{3} (Note: Ring 3: ring gear of gearset 3)	S_{4} (Note: Sun 4: sun gear of gearset 4) R_{4} (Note: Ring 4: ring gear of gearset 4)	Brakes Clutches	Ratio Span	Gear Step (Note: Standard 50:50 — 50 % is above and 50 % is below the average gear step —: With steadily decreasing gear steps (yellow highlighted line Step); and a particularly large step from 1st to 2nd gear; the lower half of the gear steps (between the small gears; rounded down, here the first 3) is always larger; and the upper half of the gear steps (between the large gears; rounded up, here the last 4) is always smaller; than the average gear step (cell highlighted yellow two rows above on the far right); lower half: smaller gear steps are a waste of possible ratios (red bold); upper half: larger gear steps are unsatisfactory (red bold))
Gear	R	1	2	3	4	5	6	7	8
Gear Ratio	${i_R}$	${i_1}$	${i_2}$	${i_3}$	${i_4}$	${i_5}$	${i_6}$	${i_7}$	${i_8}$
Step	$-\frac{i_R} {i_1}$ (Note: Standard R:1 — reverse and 1st gear have the same ratio —: The ideal reverse gear has the same transmission ratio as 1st gear; no impairment when maneuvering; especially when towing a trailer; a torque converter can only partially compensate for this deficiency; Plus 11.11 % minus 10 % compared to 1st gear is good; Plus 25 % minus 20 % is acceptable (red); Above this is unsatisfactory (bold); see also Total ratio span (total gear ratio/total transmission ratio) effective)	$\frac{i_1} {i_1}$	$\frac{i_1} {i_2}$ (Note: Standard 1:2 — gear step 1st to 2nd gear as small as possible —: With continuously decreasing gear steps (yellow marked line Step); the largest gear step is the one from 1st to 2nd gear, which; for a good speed connection and; a smooth gear shift; must be as small as possible; A gear ratio of up to 1.6667 : 1 (5 : 3) is good; Up to 1.7500 : 1 (7 : 4) is acceptable (red); Above is unsatisfactory (bold))	$\frac{i_2} {i_3}$	$\frac{i_3} {i_4}$	$\frac{i_4} {i_5}$	$\frac{i_5} {i_6}$	$\frac{i_6} {i_7}$	$\frac{i_7} {i_8}$
Δ Step (Note: From large to small gears (from right to left)) (Note: Standard STEP — from large to small gears: steady and progressive increase in gear steps —: Gear steps should; increase: Δ Step (first green highlighted line Δ Step) is always greater than 1; As progressive as possible: Δ Step is always greater than the previous step; Not progressively increasing is acceptable (red); Not increasing is unsatisfactory (bold))			$\tfrac{i_1} {i_2} : \tfrac{i_2} {i_3}$	$\tfrac{i_2} {i_3} : \tfrac{i_3} {i_4}$	$\tfrac{i_3} {i_4} : \tfrac{i_4} {i_5}$	$\tfrac{i_4} {i_5} : \tfrac{i_5} {i_6}$	$\tfrac{i_5} {i_6} : \tfrac{i_6} {i_7}$	$\tfrac{i_6} {i_7} : \tfrac{i_7} {i_8}$	
Shaft Speed	$\frac{i_1} {i_R}$	$\frac{i_1} {i_1}$	$\frac{i_1} {i_2}$	$\frac{i_1} {i_3}$	$\frac{i_1} {i_4}$	$\frac{i_1} {i_5}$	$\frac{i_1} {i_6}$	$\frac{i_1} {i_7}$	$\frac{i_1} {i_8}$
Δ Shaft Speed (Note: Standard SPEED — from small to large gears: steady increase in shaft speed difference —: Shaft speed differences should; increase: Δ Shaft Speed (second line marked in green Δ (Shaft) Speed) is always greater than the previous one; 1 difference smaller than the previous one is acceptable (red); 2 consecutive ones are a waste of possible ratios (bold))	$0 - \tfrac{i_1} {i_R}$	$\tfrac{i_1} {i_1} - 0$	$\tfrac{i_1} {i_2} - \tfrac{i_1} {i_1}$	$\tfrac{i_1} {i_3} - \tfrac{i_1} {i_2}$	$\tfrac{i_1} {i_4} - \tfrac{i_1} {i_3}$	$\tfrac{i_1} {i_5} - \tfrac{i_1} {i_4}$	$\tfrac{i_1} {i_6} - \tfrac{i_1} {i_5}$	$\tfrac{i_1} {i_7} - \tfrac{i_1} {i_6}$	$\tfrac{i_1} {i_8} - \tfrac{i_1} {i_7}$
Torque Ratio	$\mu_R$	$\mu_1$	$\mu_2$	$\mu_3$	$\mu_4$	$\mu_5$	$\mu_6$	$\mu_7$	$\mu_8$
Efficiency $\eta_n$	$\frac{\mu_R} {i_R}$	$\frac{\mu_1} {i_1}$	$\frac{\mu_2} {i_2}$	$\frac{\mu_3} {i_3}$	$\frac{\mu_4} {i_4}$	$\frac{\mu_5} {i_5}$	$\frac{\mu_6} {i_6}$	$\frac{\mu_7} {i_7}$	$\frac{\mu_8} {i_8}$
8L 90-M5U 8L 80-MFC 8L 80-N8X	900 N⋅m (664 lb⋅ft); 2014 (Note: Model year 2015) · 2023		41; 79	46; 86	37; 73	25; 89	2; 3	6.9991; 5.8595	1.7236
8L 90-M5U 8L 80-MFC 8L 80-N8X	900 N⋅m (664 lb⋅ft); 2014 · 2023		41; 79	46; 86	37; 73	25; 89	2; 3	6.9991; 5.8595	1.3204
Gear	R	1	2	3	4	5	6	7	8
Gear Ratio	−3.8176 $-\tfrac{43,043}{11,275}$	4.5600 $\tfrac{114}{25}$	2.9709 $\tfrac{817}{275}$	2.0751 $\tfrac{12,540}{6,043}$	1.6876 $\tfrac{4,121}{2,442}$	1.2700 $\tfrac{28,817,100}{22,690,429}$	1.0000 $\tfrac{1}{1}$	0.8455 $\tfrac{5,160}{6,103}$	0.6515 $\tfrac{43}{66}$
Step	0.8372	1.0000	1.5349	1.4317	1.2297	1.3288	1.2700	1.1828	1.2977
Δ Step			1.0721	1.1643	0.9254	1.0463	1.0738	0.9114	
Speed	–1.1945	1.0000	1.5349	2.1975	2.7021	3.5905	4.56	5.3933	6.9991
Δ Speed	1.1945	1.0000	0.5349	0.6626	0.5047	0.8884	0.9695	0.8333	1.6057
Torque Ratio	–3.6149 –3.5155	4.48887; 4.4532	2.9039; 2.8704	2.0535; 2.0255	1.6650; 1.6385	1.2578; 1.2516	1.0000	0.8411; 0.8409	0.6469; 0.6446
Efficiency $\eta_n$	0.9469; 0.9209	0.9844; 0.9766	0.9774; 0.9662	0.9896; 0.9761	0.9866; 0.9709	0.9904; 0.9855	1.0000	0.9948; 0.9945	0.9929; 0.9893
8L 45 M5N	550 N⋅m (406 lb⋅ft); 2015 (Note: Model year 2016) · 2023		41; 79	41; 79	41; 79	26; 94	2; 3	7.0107; 5.9662	1.7431
8L 45 M5N	550 N⋅m (406 lb⋅ft); 2015 · 2023		41; 79	41; 79	41; 79	26; 94	2; 3	7.0107; 5.9662	1.3208
Gear	R	1	2	3	4	5	6	7	8
Gear Ratio	−3.9278 $-\tfrac{4,187}{1,066}$	4.6154 $\tfrac{60}{13}$	3.0385 $\tfrac{79} {26}$	2.0648 $\tfrac{7,200}{3,487}$	1.6583 $\tfrac{199}{120}$	1.2587 $\tfrac{740,760}{588,527}$	1.0000 $\tfrac{1}{1}$	0.8494 $\tfrac{9,480}{11,161}$	0.6583 $\tfrac{79}{120}$
Step	0.8510	1.0000	1.5190	1.4715	1.2451	1.3175	1.2587	1.1773	1.2902
Δ Step			1.0322	1.1819	0.9450	1.0468	1.0691	0.9125	
Speed	–1.1751	1.0000	1.5190	2.2353	2.7831	3.6669	4.6154	5.4338	7.0107
Δ Speed	1.1751	1.0000	0.5190	0.7163	0.5479	0.8837	0.9485	0.8184	1.5769
Torque Ratio	–3.7202 –3.6185	4.5431; 4.5069	2.9701; 2.9360	2.0435; 2.0328	1.6366; 1.6258	1.2468; 1.2408	1.0000	0.8451; 0.8428	0.6538; 0.6514
Efficiency $\eta_n$	0.9472; 0.9213	0.9843; 0.9765	0.9775; 0.9663	0.9897; 0.9845	0.9869; 0.9804	0.9905; 0.9858	1.0000	0.9949; 0.9923	0.9931; 0.9895
Actuated shift elements (Note: Permanently coupled elements: S_{1} and R_{2}; C_{1} and C_{4}; S_{2} and S_{3}; C_{3} and R_{4})
Brake A (Note: Blocks S_{2} and S_{3})	❶	❶	❶					❶	❶
Brake B (Note: Blocks R_{3})	❶	❶	❶	❶	❶	❶			
Clutch C (Note: Couples C_{2} and S_{4} with the input (turbine))		❶		❶		❶	❶	❶	
Clutch D (Note: Couples R_{1} with S_{4})	❶				❶	❶	❶	❶	❶
Clutch E (Note: Couples S_{1} and R_{2} with S_{4})			❶	❶	❶		❶		❶
Geometric ratios: speed conversion
Gear Ratio (Note: Adjusted formulas with gearset 1 and 3 swapped) R & 1 & 2 Ordinary (Note: Ordinary noted: For direct determination of the gear ratio) Elementary Noted (Note: Elementary noted: Alternative representation for determining the transmission ratio; Contains only operands; With simple fractions of both central gears of a planetary gearset; Or with the value 1; As a basis; For reliable; And traceable; Determination of specific torque and efficiency)	$i_R = \frac{R_2 (S_1 S_4- R_1 R_4)} {S_1 S_4 (S_2+ R_2)}$			$i_1 = \frac{S_4+ R_4} {S_4}$			$i_2 = \frac{R_2 (S_4+ R_4)} {(S_2+ R_2) S_4}$		
Gear Ratio R & 1 & 2 Ordinary Elementary Noted	$i_R = \tfrac{1- \tfrac{R_1 R_4} {S_1 S_4}} {1+ \tfrac{S_2} {R_2}}$			$i_1 = 1+ \tfrac{R_4} {S_4}$			$i_2 = \tfrac{1+ \tfrac{R_4} {S_4}} {1+ \tfrac{S_2} {R_2}}$		
Gear Ratio 3 & 4 Ordinary Elementary Noted	$i_3 = \frac{(S_3+ R_3) (S_4+ R_4)} {S_4 R_3+ S_3 (S_4+ R_4)}$					$i_4 = 1+\frac{S_2 R_3} {S_3 (S_2+ R_2)}$			
Gear Ratio 3 & 4 Ordinary Elementary Noted	$i_3 = \tfrac{1} {\tfrac{1} {1+ \tfrac{R_3} {S_3}} +\tfrac{1} {\left (1+ \tfrac{S_3} {R_3} \right) \left( 1+ \tfrac{R_4} {S_4} \right)}}$					$i_4 = 1+ \tfrac{\tfrac{R_3} {S_3}} {1+ \tfrac{R_2} {S_2}}$			
Gear Ratio 5 Ordinary Elementary Noted	$i_5 = \frac{S_3 R_2 R_4 (S_1+ R_1)+ S_2 S_1 (S_3+ R_3) (S_4+ R_4)} {S_3 R_4 (S_1 (S_2+ R_2)+ R_1 R_2)+ S_1 S_2 S_4 (S_3+ R_3)}$								
Gear Ratio 5 Ordinary Elementary Noted	$i_5 = \tfrac{1} {\tfrac{1} {{\tfrac{ \left( 1+ \tfrac{R_3} {S_3} \right) \left( 1+ \tfrac{S_4} {R_4} \right)} {1+ \tfrac{R_2} {S_2} \left( 1+ \tfrac{R_1} {S_1} \right)} + \tfrac{1} {\tfrac{1} {1+ \tfrac{S_1} {R_1}}+ \tfrac{1+ \tfrac{S_2} {R_2}} {1+ \tfrac{R_1} {S_1}}}}} + \tfrac{1} {1+ \tfrac{R_4} {S_4}+ \tfrac{ \tfrac{R_2 R_4} {S_2 S_4} \left( 1+ \tfrac{R_1} {S_1} \right)} {1+ \tfrac{R_3} {S_3}}}}$								
Gear Ratio 6 – 8 Ordinary Elementary Noted	$i_6 = \frac{1} {1}$		$i_7 = \frac{R_2 (S_1+ R_1)} {R_2 (S_1+ R_1)+ S_1 S_2}$				$i_8 = \frac{R_2} {S_2 + R_2}$		
Gear Ratio 6 – 8 Ordinary Elementary Noted	$i_6 = \frac{1} {1}$		$i_7 = \tfrac{1} {1+ \tfrac{\tfrac{S_2} {R_2}} {1+ \tfrac{R_1} {S_1}}}$				$i_8 = \tfrac{1} {1+ \tfrac{S_2} {R_2}}$		
Kinetic ratios: torque conversion
Torque Ratio R & 1 & 2	$\mu_R = \tfrac{1- \tfrac{R_1 R_4} {S_1 S_4} {\eta_0}^2} {1+ \tfrac{S_2} {R_2} \cdot \tfrac{1} {\eta_0}}$			$\mu_1 = 1+ \tfrac{R_4} {S_4} {\eta_0}$			$\mu_2 = \tfrac{1+ \tfrac{R_4} {S_4} \eta_0} {1+ \tfrac{S_2} {R_2} \cdot \tfrac{1} {\eta_0}}$		
Torque Ratio 3 & 4	$\mu_3 = \tfrac{1} {\tfrac{1} {1+ \tfrac{R_3} {S_3} {\eta_0}^\tfrac{1} {2}} +\tfrac{1} { \left( 1+ \tfrac{S_3} {R_3} {\eta_0}^\tfrac{1} {2} \right) \left(1+ \tfrac{R_4} {S_4} \eta_0 \right)}}$					$\mu_4 = 1+ \tfrac{\tfrac{R_3} {S_3} \eta_0} {1+ \tfrac{R_2} {S_2} \cdot \tfrac{1} {\eta_0}}$			
Torque Ratio 5	$\mu_5 = \tfrac{1} {\tfrac{1} {{\tfrac{ \left( 1+ \tfrac{R_3} {S_3} {\eta_0}^\tfrac{1} {2} \right) \left( 1+ \tfrac{S_4} {R_4} {\eta_0}^\tfrac{1} {3} \right)} {1+ \tfrac{R_2} {S_2} \cdot \tfrac{1} {{\eta_0}^\tfrac{1} {3}} \left( 1+ \tfrac{R_1} {S_1} \cdot \tfrac{1} {{\eta_0}^\tfrac{1} {4}} \right)} + \tfrac{1} {\tfrac{1} {1+ \tfrac{S_1} {R_1} {\eta_0}^\tfrac{1} {4}} + \tfrac{1+ \tfrac{S_2} {R_2} \cdot \tfrac{1} {{\eta_0}^\tfrac{1} {3}}} {1+ \tfrac{R_1} {S_1} {\eta_0}^\tfrac{1} {4}}}}} + \tfrac{1} {1+ \tfrac{R_4} {S_4} {\eta_0}^\tfrac{1} {3} + \tfrac{ \tfrac{R_2 R_4} {S_2 S_4} {\eta_0}^\tfrac{2} {3} \left( 1+ \tfrac{R_1} {S_1} {\eta_0}^\tfrac{1} {4} \right)} {1+ \tfrac{R_3} {S_3} \cdot \tfrac{1} {{\eta_0}^\tfrac{1} {2}}}}}$								
Torque Ratio 6 – 8	$\mu_6 = \tfrac{1} {1}$		$\mu_7 = \tfrac{1} {1+ \tfrac{\tfrac{S_2} {R_2} \cdot \tfrac{1} {\eta_0}} {1+ \tfrac{R_1} {S_1} \eta_0}}$				$\mu_8 = \tfrac{1} {1+ \tfrac{S_2} {R_2} \cdot \tfrac{1} {\eta_0}}$		
8HP70 (Note: without generation designation) (Note: First transmission on the market to use the dedicated 8-speed layout: gearset 1 and 3 not swapped; for comparison purposes only)	700 N⋅m (516 lb⋅ft); 2008		48; 96	48; 96	69; 111	23; 85	2; 3	7.0435; 4.9452	1.7693
8HP70	700 N⋅m (516 lb⋅ft); 2008		48; 96	48; 96	69; 111	23; 85	2; 3	7.0435; 4.9452	1.3216
Gear	R	1	2	3	4	5	6	7	8
Gear Ratio	−3.2968 $-\tfrac{1,744}{529}$	4.6957 $\tfrac{108}{23}$	3.1304 $\tfrac{72}{23}$	2.1039 $\tfrac{162}{77}$	1.6667 $\tfrac{5}{3}$	1.2845 $\tfrac{8,826}{6,871}$	1.0000 $\tfrac{1}{1}$	0.8392 $\tfrac{120}{143}$	0.6667 $\tfrac{2}{3}$
Step	0.7021	1.0000	1.5000	1.4879	1.2623	1.2975	1.2845	1.1917	1.2587
Δ Step			1.0081	1.1787	0.9729	1.0101	1.0779	0.9467	
Speed	–1.4243	1.0000	1.5000	2.2319	2.8174	3.6555	4.6957	5.5965	7.0435
Δ Speed	1.4243	1.0000	0.5000	0.7319	0.5855	0.8382	1.0401	0.9000	1.4478
Torque Ratio	–3.1186 –3.0313	4.6217; 4.5848	3.0603; 3.0253	2.0820; 2.0709	1.6446; 1.6336	1.2720; 1.2658	1.0000	0.8347; 0.8324	0.6622; 0.6599
Efficiency $\eta_n$	0.9460; 0.9195	0.9843; 0.9764	0.9776; 0.9664	0.9896; 0.9843	0.9867; 0.9802	0.9903; 0.9854	1.0000	0.9947; 0.9920	0.9932; 0.9898
Gear Ratio (Note: Original formulas: gearset 1 and 3 not swapped; for comparison purposes only) R & 1 & 2	$i_R = \frac{R_2 (S_3 S_4- R_3 R_4)} {S_3 S_4 (S_2+ R_2)}$			$i_1 = \frac{S_4+ R_4} {S_4}$			$i_2 = \frac{R_2 (S_4+ R_4)} {(S_2+ R_2) S_4}$		
Gear Ratio 3 & 4	$i_3 = \frac{(S_1+ R_1) (S_4+ R_4)} {S_4 R_1+ S_1 (S_4+ R_4)}$					$i_4 = 1+\frac{S_2 R_1} {S_1 (S_2+ R_2)}$			
Gear Ratio 5	$i_5 = \frac{S_1 R_2 R_4 (S_3+ R_3)+ S_2 S_3 (S_1+ R_1) (S_4+ R_4)} {S_1 R_4 (S_3 (S_2+ R_2)+ R_2 R_3)+ S_2 S_3 S_4 (S_1+ R_1)}$								
Gear Ratio 6 – 8	$i_6 = \frac{1} {1}$		$i_7 = \frac{R_2 (S_3+ R_3)} {R_2 (S_3+ R_3)+ S_2 S_3}$				$i_8 = \frac{R_2} {S_2 + R_2}$		

== Lawsuits and issues ==
8L 45 and 8L 90 transmissions manufactured between 2015 and 2019 suffer from two different, unrelated problems. The first is that the 8L’s transmission fluid can absorb moisture from the air via the vent system, especially in humid climates, which can cause the clutches to slip. This can cause some customers, especially those driving in high gears, to feel a “shake/shudder feeling” akin to driving over rumble strips or rough pavement. Introduction of moisture-resistant transmission fluid in December 2018 largely resolved this issue. The second issue is that when changing gears 8L transmissions sometimes apply too much pressure and fail to purge trapped air leaking into the valves. This issue can cause jerkiness or hard shifting when upshifting or downshifting, and other issues. This issue was resolved with the redesigned gen II transmissions, but cannot be repaired on affected transmissions.

These issues are the subject of a class-action lawsuit filed in December 2018 that alleges the transmission suffers from persistent "shudder" issues and that GM has known about the problems since its introduction and has failed to provide a solution, instead choosing to wait until the unit is out of warranty. As of 2025, the class action had been remanded to the district court for procedural issues.

== Applications ==
Variants and applications
Make	Model Years	Model	Final Drive Ratio
8L 90
Cadillac	2015–2017	Escalade	3.23
Cadillac	2016–present	ATS-V	2.85
Cadillac	2016–present	CTS-V	2.85
Cadillac	2016–present	CT6	3.27
Chevrolet	2015–2019	Corvette (C7) Stingray	2.41 (Note: Standard) or 2.73 (Note: Z51)
Chevrolet	2015–2019	Corvette (C7) Z06	2.41
Chevrolet	2019	Corvette (C7) ZR1	2.73
Chevrolet	2015–present	Silverado	3.23 or 3.42 (Note: Maximum Trailering Package)
Chevrolet	2015–present	Colorado	3.42
Chevrolet	2016–2018	Camaro SS	2.77
Chevrolet	2017–present	Express (Note: 2.8 L diesel engine and 4.3 L gas engine only)	
GMC	2015–2017	Yukon Denali · Denali XL	3.23
GMC	2015–present	Sierra	3.23
GMC	2015–present	Canyon	3.42
8L 80
Chevrolet	2023–present	Colorado	
Chevrolet	2024–present	Silverado	
GMC	2023–present	Canyon	
8L 45
Cadillac	2016–2019	ATS	
Cadillac	2016–2019	CTS	
Cadillac	2020–present	CT4	
Cadillac	2016–present	CT6	
Chevrolet	2016–2023	Camaro LT (2.0L)	3.27
Chevrolet	2016–2019	Camaro LT (3.6L)	2.77
Chevrolet	2017–present	Colorado	3.42
GMC	2017–present	Canyon	

== See also ==
- List of GM transmissions
