= Tremec TR-6070 transmission =

Seven-speed RWD manual transmission

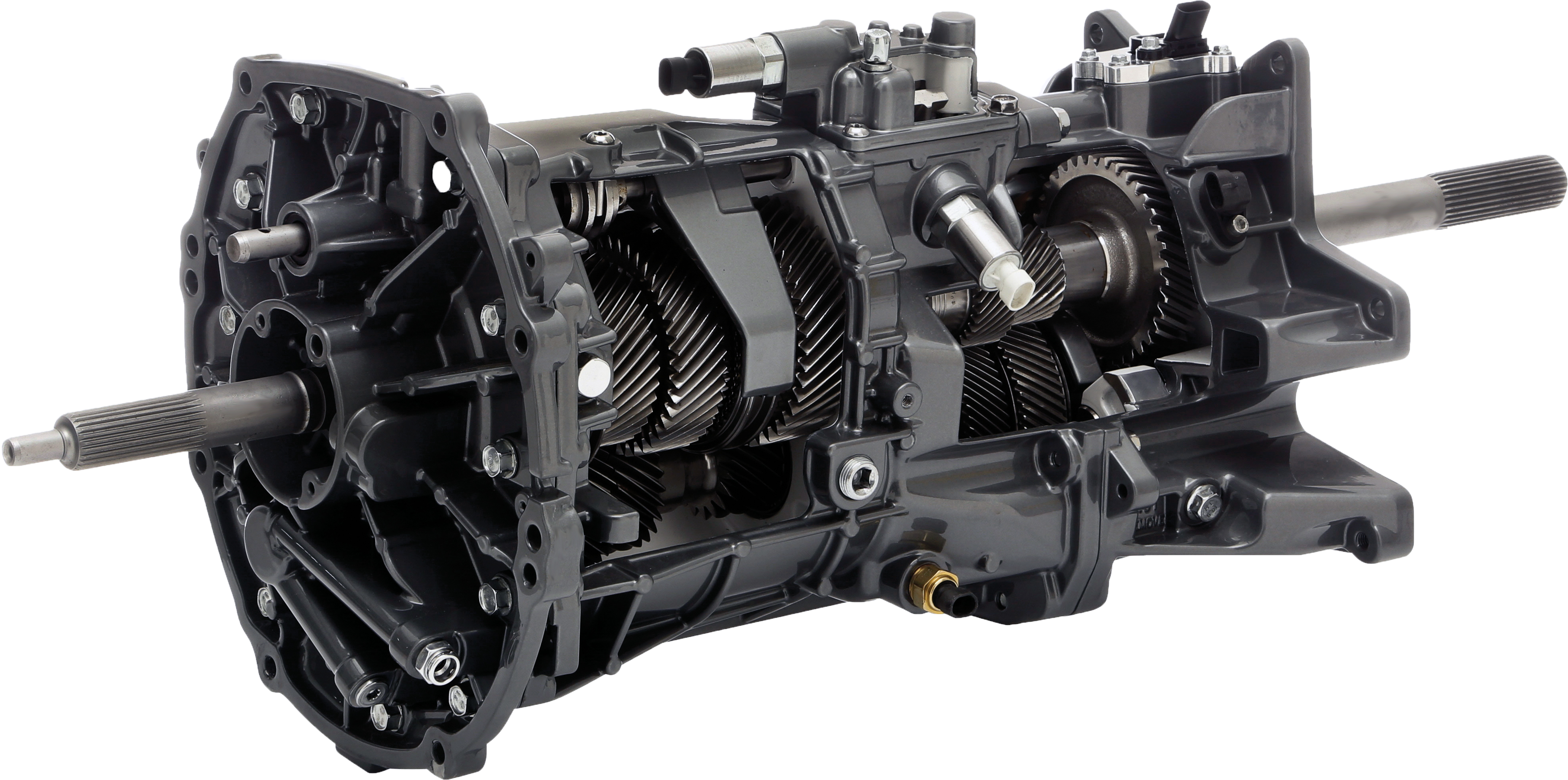
Cut-away view of TREMEC TR-6070 transmission

The TREMEC TR-6070 seven-speed RWD manual transmission features seven forward speeds and one reverse speed. It is manufactured by TREMEC Corporation (formerly Transmission Technologies Corporation).

The TR-6070 is based on the TREMEC TR-6060 six-speed transmission. A triple overdrive gear was added to improve fuel economy and lower emissions. Incorporated in the TR-6070 is a Gear Absolute Position (GAP) sensor. The technology provides a signal from the transmission to the engine controller, inferring the real-time position of the shift selector. With this information, the engine RPM can be controlled to match the next gear selection - which enhances drivability.

Design features of the TR-6070 synchronizers include a combination of double-cone and triple-cone rings, utilizing a hybrid solution on all forward gears. The hybrid rings are a combination of carbon and sintered bronze cones providing higher capacity and shift performance. Linear bearings lower the friction of the shift rail movements, making the shifter feel naturally lighter and more direct.

The TR-6070 features at a glance:

- Rear-wheel drive, seven-speed manual overdrive transmission
- Triple overdrive for improved fuel economy and lower emissions
- Gear ratio spread of up to 6.33
- Triple- and double-cone synchronizers
- Advanced and asymmetric clutch teeth in second and third-speed gears
- Two-piece gear design for high torque capacity
- Low mass, hollow shaft design available
- Sensors include: Temperature | Speed | Gear position

== Applications ==
- 2014–2019 Chevrolet Corvette

== Selected Gear Ratios ==
Model	1st	2nd	3rd	4th	5th	6th	7th	Reverse	Input Torque
2014-2019 Chevrolet Corvette	2.66	1.78	1.30	1.00	0.74	0.50	0.42	2.90	740 Nm 545 lb-ft
2014-2019 Chevrolet Corvette Z51/Grand Sport	2.97	2.07	1.43	1.00	0.71	0.57	0.48	2.90	625 Nm 460 lb-ft
2015-2019 Chevrolet Corvette Z06/ZR1	2.29	1.61	1.21	1.00	0.82	0.68	0.45	2.70	860 Nm 635 lb-ft

== See also ==
- Tremec
