= TREMEC Corporation =

Automobile component manufacturer in Mexico

TREMEC (Transmisiones y Equipos Mecánicos SA de CV, formerly Transmission Technology Corporation, TTC) is a manufacturer of automobile transmissions and drivetrain components based in Querétaro, Mexico.

== Company ==
Torque transfer solutions from TREMEC are found in products ranging from supercars and high-performance sports cars to severe duty, vocational and commercial vehicles worldwide. The portfolio of products includes manual transmissions, dual-clutch transmissions, hybrid and electric vehicle (EV) solutions, gears, driveshafts, clutches, mechatronic systems, transmission control units, and control software.

The company is headquartered in Santiago de Querétaro, Mexico and has its US operations based in Novi, Michigan. This location assembles the TR-9080 Dual Clutch Transmission as well as housing sales, marketing and engineering (and was, until 2017, based in Plymouth, Michigan). Production facilities are also located in Pedro Escobedo and Santiago de Querétaro, in Mexico, and Zedelgem (Bruges area) in Belgium. Research and Development is based in the Belgium location and engineering is also located in Queretaro. TREMEC is a wholly owned subsidiary of KUO Group, which is based in Mexico City.

Some of the first TREMEC products were originally designed by Borg-Warner, including the widely used T-56.

== History ==
TREMEC was founded on April 12, 1964. The genesis was to manufacture transmissions in Mexico for Ford, GM and Chrysler. At that time, the Mexican government enacted a protectionist policy that mandated all vehicles assembled in Mexico have engines and transmissions 100-percent manufactured in Mexico. A joint venture was formed which included one of Ford's large transmissions suppliers – Clark Transmissions – and two entrepreneurial companies based in Mexico. TREMEC's first transmissions would be produced later that same year.

== Products ==
- Aftermarket transmissions
  - Tremec T-5 transmission (1982-2010)
  - Tremec T-45 transmission (1996-2001)
  - Tremec TKO transmission
  - Tremec TKO-500 transmission
  - Tremec TKO-600 transmission
  - Tremec TKX transmission
  - Tremec T-56 transmission (1992-2008)
  - TREMEC Magnum 6-speed transmission (2009-Present)
  - TREMEC Magnum F 6-speed transmission (2009-Present)
  - TREMEC Magnum XL 6-speed transmission (2012-Present)
- OEM transmissions
  - Tremec TR-2450 transmission
  - Tremec TR-3160 transmission (2013-Present)
  - Tremec TR-3450 transmission (1989-2006)
  - Tremec TR-3550 transmission
  - Tremec TR-3650 transmission (2001-2010)
    - TR-3655 transmission
  - Tremec TR-4050 transmission (1995-2001)
  - Tremec TR-6060 transmission (2007-Present)
  - Tremec TR-6070 transmission (2014-2019)
  - Tremec TR-9070 DCT 7-speed dual clutch transmission (2019-Present)
  - Tremec TR-9080 DCT 8-speed dual clutch transmission (2020-Present)
- Medium & Heavy Duty Truck Transmissions
  - EASY-SHIFT 5-speed
  - EASY-SHIFT 7-speed
  - PRO-SHIFT 6-Speed
  - PRO-SHIFT 7-Speed
  - PRO-SHIFT 9-Speed
  - PRO-SHIFT 10-Speed
  - PRO-SHIFT 18-Speed
