= Chrysler NSG370 transmission =

Manual transmission

The Chrysler NSG370 is a six-speed overdrive manual transmission sourced from Mercedes and built in the Stuttgart Transmission Plant. It is Jeep's first six-speed manual transmission and Chrysler's second after the Dodge Viper T-56.

The NSG370 does not use standard gear oil for lubrication. This transmission utilizes bronze synchronizer collars resulting in sensitivity to lubricant make-up. Only a fluid characterized by Chrysler specification MS-9224 should be used in order to avoid premature wear or failure of internal parts as well as voiding the factory warranty. Pennzoil Synchromesh is one such petroleum based lubricant.

Transmissions from Jeep wranglers Length: 23.5" (I6), 24.8" (V6).

It features a 14mm hex fill plug on the passenger side and a 17mm hex drain plug on the bottom (with a strong magnet for attracting metal flakes).

Gear ratios:

1	2	3	4	5	6	R
4.459	2.614	1.723	1.245	1.000	0.838	4.062

Applications:

- 2005-2008 Jeep Liberty
- 2005–2006 Jeep Wrangler TJ
- 2007–2018 Jeep Wrangler JK
- 2004-2006 Chrysler Crossfire
- 2006-2008 Dodge Nitro

== See also ==
- List of Chrysler transmissions
- General Motors Parts
