= Dodge Nitro =

Compact SUV

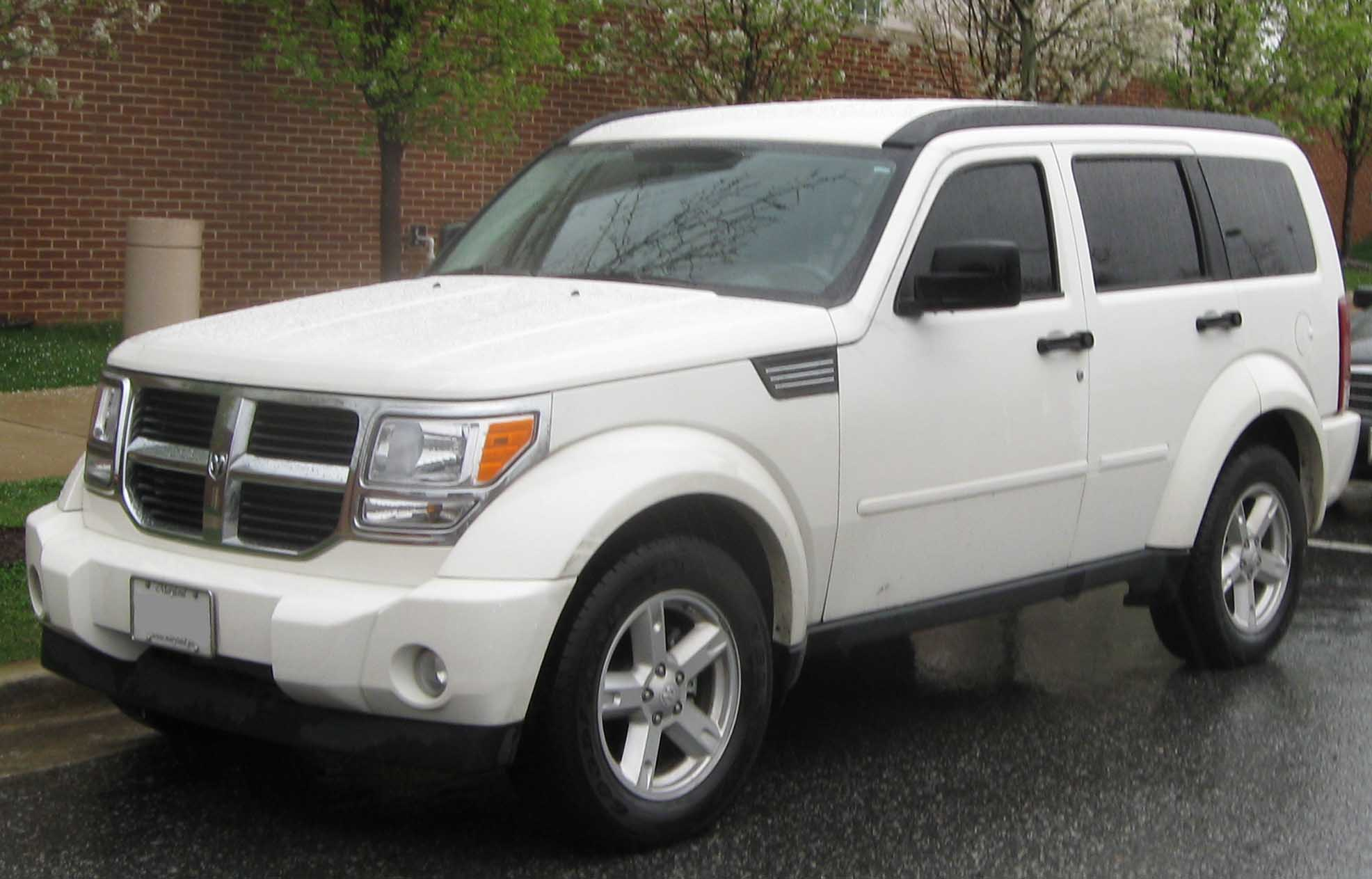

Overview
- Manufacturer: DaimlerChrysler (2007); Chrysler LLC (2007-2009); Chrysler Group LLC (2009-2012)
- Production: August 2006–December 16, 2011
- Model years: 2007–2011 (2012 fleet only)
- Assembly: Toledo, Ohio, United States
- Designer: Dennis Myles (2004)

Body and chassis
- Class: Compact SUV
- Body style: 4-door SUV
- Layout: Longitudinal Front engine, rear-wheel drive / four-wheel drive
- Platform: Chrysler KA platform
- Related: Jeep Liberty; Jeep Grand Cherokee; Jeep Commander; Jeep Wrangler

Powertrain
- Engine: 3.7 L Chrysler (226 cu in) PowerTech EKG SOHC V6; 4.0 L Chrysler (241 cu in) 4.0 SOHC V6; 2.8 L VM Motori R 428 CRD DOHC I4 turbo-diesel (export only)
- Transmission: 6-speed Chrysler NSG-370 manual (2006–2008); 4-speed Chrysler Ultradrive 42RLE automatic 5-speed Mercedes-Benz A580/5G-Tronic automatic

Dimensions
- Wheelbase: 108.8 in (2,764 mm)
- Length: 178.9 in (4,544 mm)
- Width: 73.1 in (1,857 mm)
- Height: 69.9 in (1,775 mm)
- Curb weight: 4,162 lb (1,888 kg)

The Dodge Nitro is a compact SUV manufactured and marketed by Dodge for model years 2007–2012 across a single generation — as a close variant of the second-generation Jeep Liberty. Both vehicles use a composite unitized construction integrating the body structure with full-length frame rails.

The Nitro entered production in August 2006 alongside the Liberty at the Toledo North Assembly Plant in Toledo, Ohio and was offered in a single, four-door body configuration. Like the Liberty, it was manufactured in RHD and LHD configurations, and marketed globally. Sales commenced in September 2006 for model year 2007 in rear-wheel drive or with optional part-time four-wheel drive. Approximately 200,000 Nitro models were manufactured before production ended in December 2011.

== Background ==
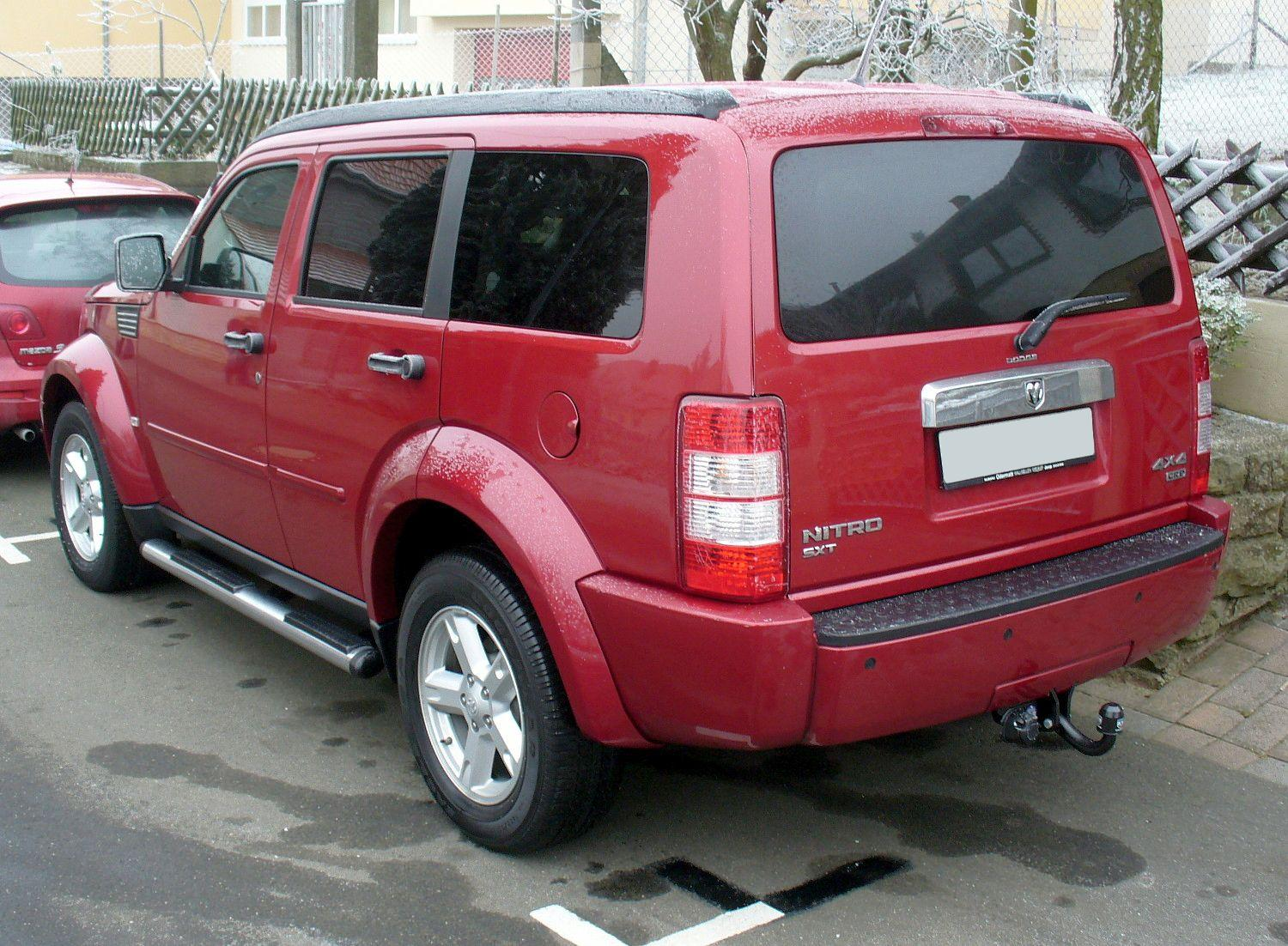
Dodge Nitro SXT 4x4

The Nitro debuted in February 2005 at the Chicago Auto Show as a concept with aluminum-trimmed vents door handles and rear hatch, as well as an interior with a center stack and shifter in satin silver.

The Nitro became Dodge's first compact SUV model since the Raider was discontinued in 1990. It also became the first modern Dodge marketed in Europe, where the Nitro was Dodge's only SUV until the 2009 model year when the larger, car-based, lower-priced Dodge Journey crossover SUV arrived.

The Nitro shares mechanicals and much bodywork with its platform-mate, the Jeep Liberty, while using a slightly extended wheelbase, the extra length split between the rear seat and cargo areas.

The Nitro debuted with an SUV class-leading 5,000-pound (2,300 kg) towing capacity. Safety features such as electronic roll mitigation, traction control, and side curtain airbags, as well as a functional sliding cargo floor marketed as Load 'N Go were offered as standard equipment. The system allows a moveable floor panel to slide out from the cargo area by 18 in (457 mm) to ease loading.

== Model years ==
For its debut in 2007, two-wheel and four-wheel drive were offered, along with a choice of a 3.7 L or 4.0 L V6 engines. The model designations were the SXT, SLT, and R/T. Available interior seating surfaces included cloth, stain-repellent cloth, and perforated leather. Standard safety features included front and rear side airbags, side curtain airbags, an electronic stability program with traction control and brake assist, electronic roll mitigation, and a tire-pressure monitor. The four-cylinder version was sold exclusively in Europe.

For the 2008 model year, the Nitro came in both 4x2 and 4x4 versions in SXT and SLT trim levels, each with a standard 210-hp 3.7 L V6 engine. The SXT trim included a standard six-speed manual transmission with an optional four-speed automatic. The SLT trim included a standard four-speed automatic. The optional R/T package increased the level of equipment with a 260-hp 4.0 L V6 engine mated to a five-speed automatic transmission. The Nitro's SXT trim included standard power mirrors, windows, and door locks with remote keyless entry, satellite radio, air conditioning, and seating for five. The SXT and R/T added alloy wheels, a power driver's seat, stain-repellent cloth, the Load 'N Go retractable cargo floor, fold-flat front-row passenger seat, cruise control, and an overhead console with a trip computer, compass, and exterior temperature display. Standard safety features included front airbags, side curtain airbags, traction and stability control with roll-over mitigation, brake assist, and a tire-pressure monitor.

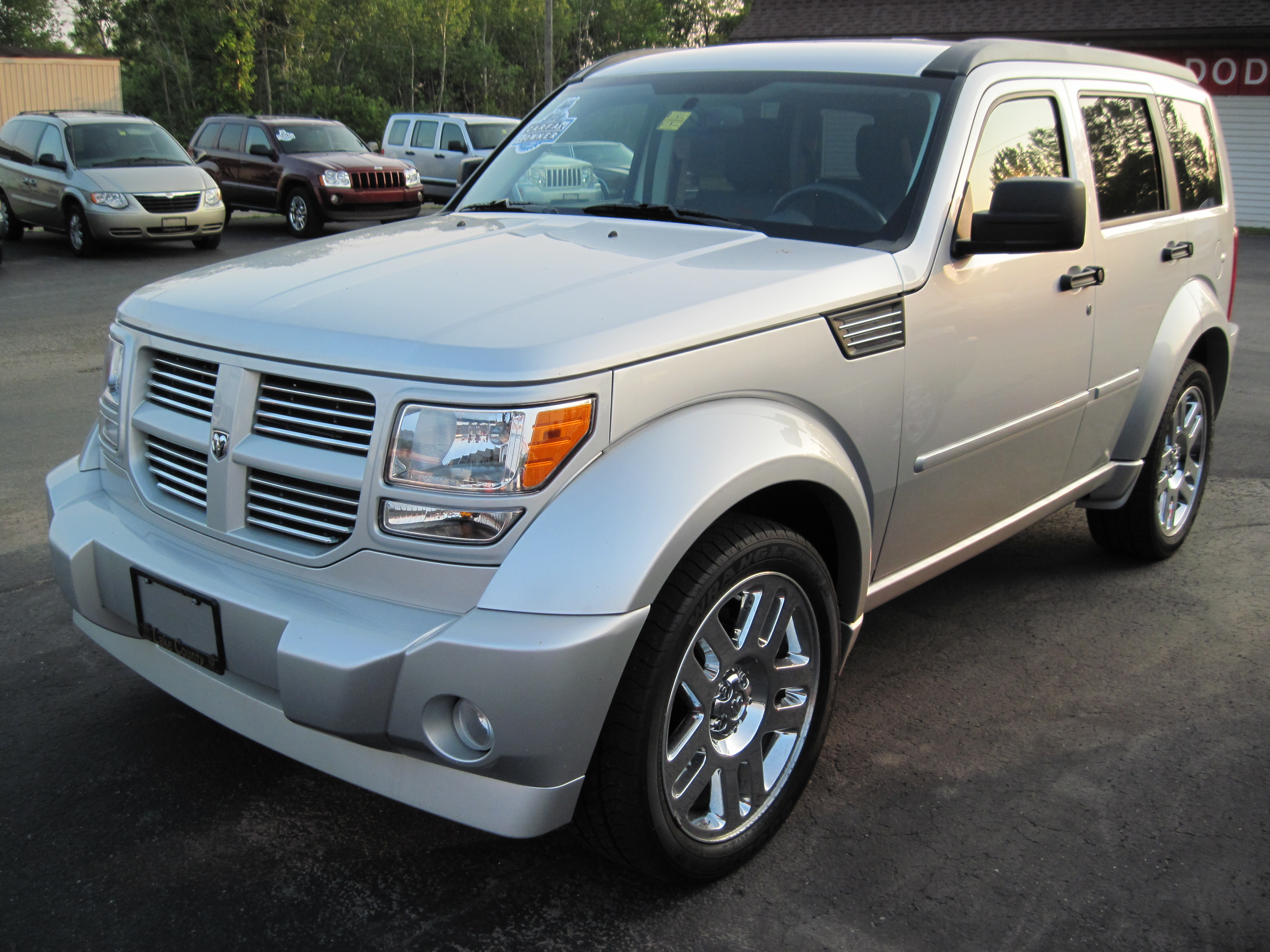
Dodge Nitro R/T

In 2009, the Nitro was offered in both 4x2 and 4x4 versions with two trims levels: SE and SLT. Both came with a standard 210-hp 3.7 L V6 engine mated to a four-speed automatic transmission. The SXT with its six-speed manual transmission had been replaced by the SE trim that featured the automatic transmission. The SLT trim offered the optional R/T package which was made available with a 260-hp 4.0 L V6 engine mated to a five-speed automatic transmission. The Nitro's SE trim standards included power mirrors, windows, and door locks with remote keyless entry, satellite radio, air conditioning, and seating for five. The SXT and R/T added alloy wheels, a power driver's seat, stain-repellent cloth, the Load 'N Go retractable cargo floor, cruise control, and an overhead console with a trip computer, compass, and exterior temperature display. Standard safety features include front airbags, side curtain airbags, traction and stability control with roll-over mitigation, brake assist, and a tire-pressure monitor.

For the 2010 model year, three trim levels were offered: Heat, Detonator, and Shock trim levels in either 4x2 or 4x4 versions. The Heat trim was equipped with a 210-hp 3.7 L V6 engine mated to a four-speed automatic transmission. The Detonator and Shock trims included a 260-hp V6 engine mated to an automatic transmission. The Heat trim level had power mirrors, windows, and door locks with remote keyless entry, satellite radio, and air conditioning. The Detonator added a rear-park assist, remote start system, power driver's seat, cruise control, an overhead console with a trip computer, compass, and exterior temperature display. The Shock trim added heated front seats, leather trim interior, and a power sunroof. Among standard safety features were: front airbags, side curtain airbags, active head restraints, traction and stability control with roll-over mitigation, brake assist, and a tire-pressure monitor. The Load 'N Go sliding trunk floor feature was discontinued.

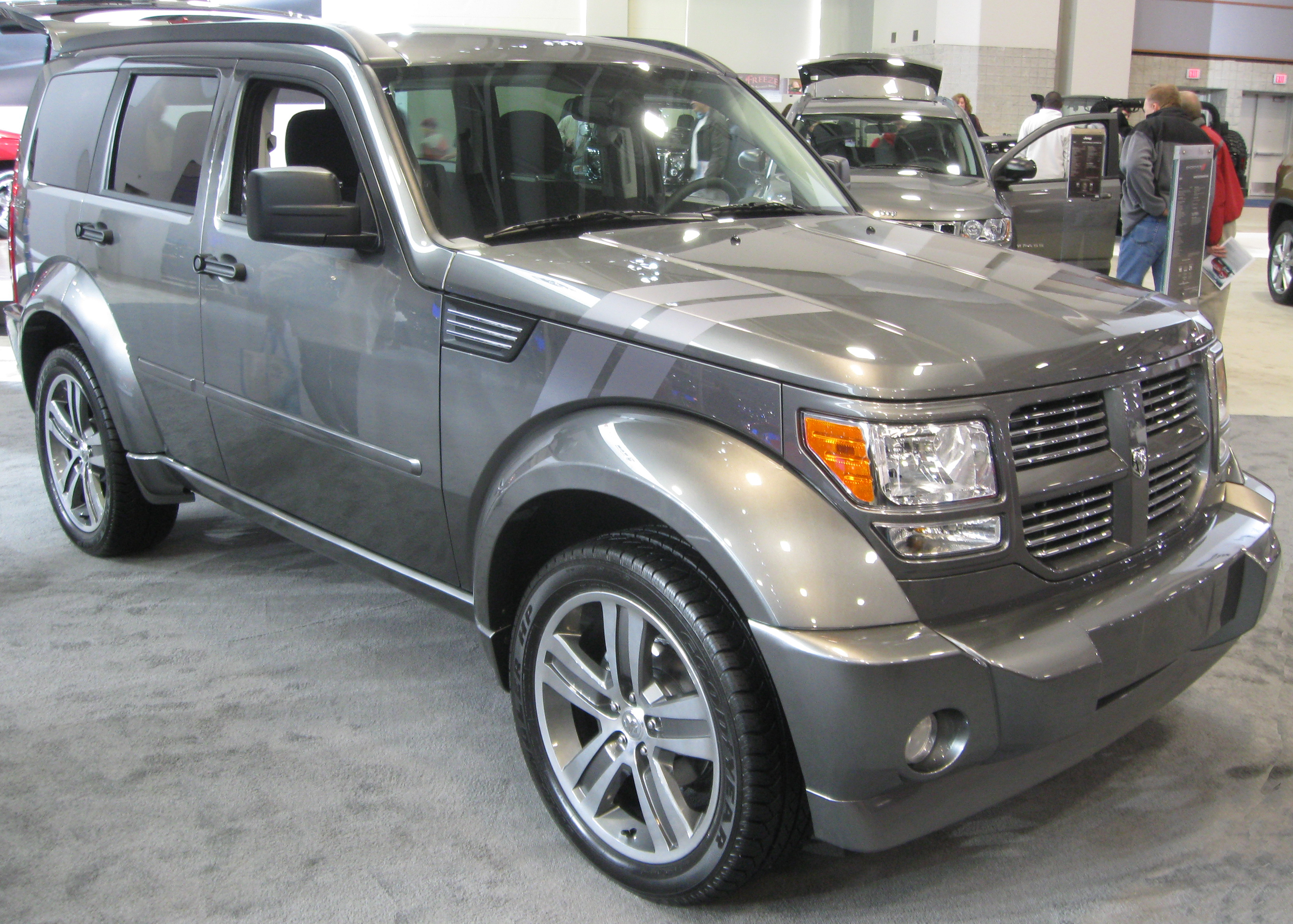
2011 Dodge Nitro Detonator

The 2011 model year continued the previous models in 4x2 or 4x4 versions with the same engines and transmissions. New for 2011 was the Heat 4.0 lifestyle package. The Heat 4.0 came standard with a five-speed automatic transmission, Uconnect Phone, and an upgraded eight-speaker sound system. Also, select models came with upgraded interiors with new cloth and leather with premium colored stitching. Detonator and Shock were branded with Dodge Brand's signature racing stripes. Additionally, all models became available with nine exterior colors, including Bright White Clear Coat, Blackberry Pearl Coat, Toxic Orange Pearl Coat, and Redline Two Coat Pearl.

Chrysler built 2012 Dodge Nitros for the fleet market only, featured in retail brochures, but not indicated on Dodge's United States & Canada websites. The final Nitro came off the assembly line in December 2011, with a total of 175,510 (conflicts with number below) units built since its introduction.

== Australia ==
In Australia, versions could have only the 3.7 L V6 in SXT trim with automatic transmission. No manual option was offered, but diesels were on sale until 2010 MY.

== Withdrawn Europe commercial ==
In early 2007, a TV advertisement in Europe for the Nitro with the tag line: "charged with adrenaline", showed a dog electrocuted after lifting its leg on the SUV's front wheel. The ad received negative attention and was withdrawn.

== U.S. sales figures ==
Calendar Year	Sales
2006	16,990
2007	74,825
2008	36,368
2009	17,443
2010	22,618
2011	24,434
2012	3,269
Total	195,247
