= Jeep Wrangler (JK) =

Motor Off-Road Vehicle

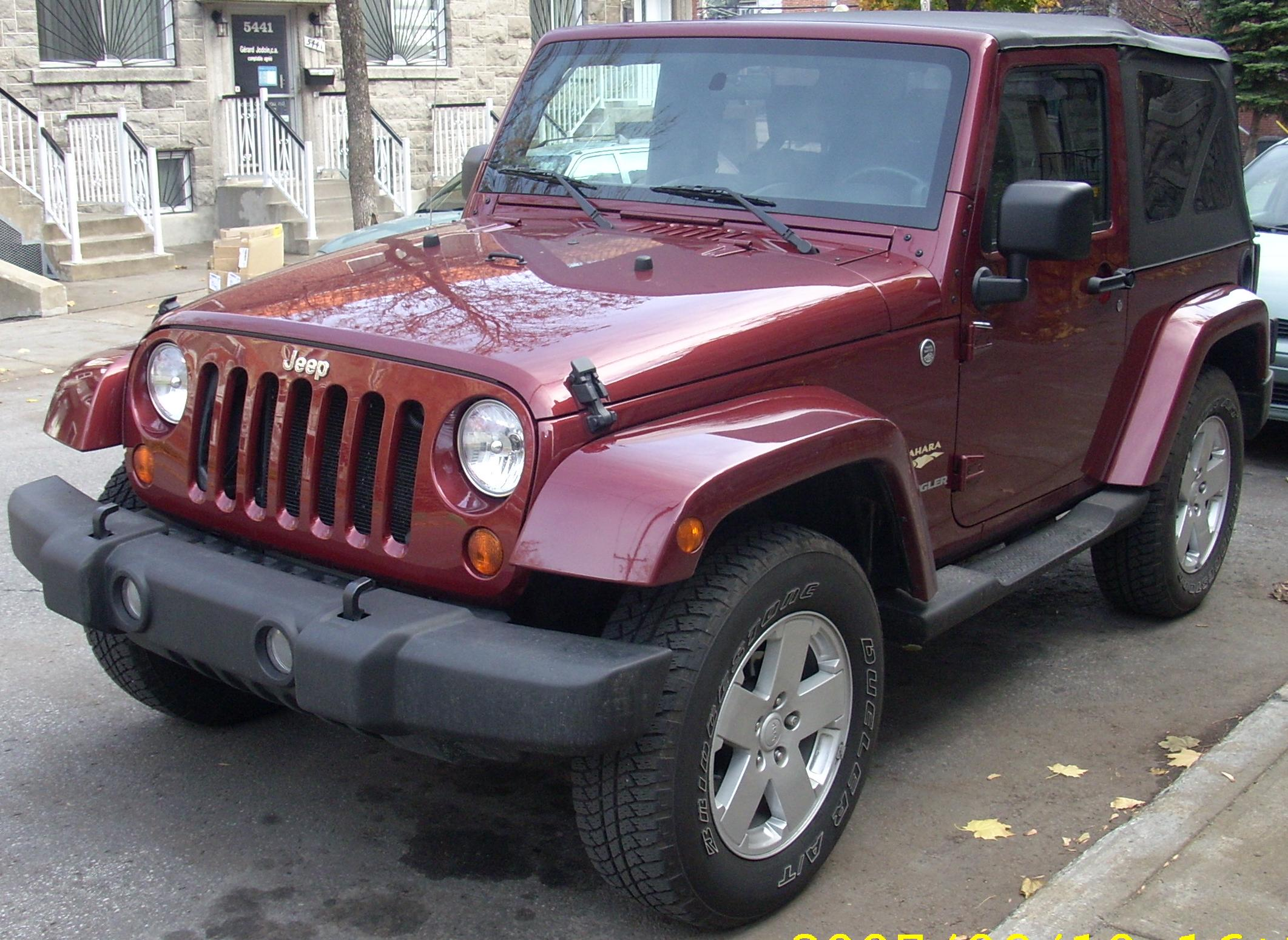
- Jeep Wrangler Sahara (JK)

Overview
- Manufacturer: Jeep (Note: DaimlerChrysler (2006–2007); Chrysler LLC (2007–2009); Chrysler Group LLC (2009–2014); FCA US LLC (2014–2018))
- Also called: Jeep J8 (Egypt); Jeep TJL-J8 (Egypt)
- Production: August 2006 – April 2018
- Model years: 2007–2018
- Assembly: United States: Toledo, Ohio (Toledo Complex); Egypt: Cairo (AAV)
- Designer: Mark Moushegian (2003); Ryan Nagode (2011 interior: 2008); Lorenzo Ramaciotti (2014 exterior: 2012)

Body and chassis
- Body style: 2-door convertible 2-door SUV; 4-door convertible 4-door SUV
- Layout: Front-engine, rear-wheel drive Front-engine, four-wheel drive
- Doors: 2-4
- Related: AIL Storm III

Powertrain
- Engine: 2.8L VM Motori RA 428 Diesel I4 Complete engine specs: •Displacement: 168.8 CID (2,766 cc); •Stroke: 3.94 in (100 mm); •Bore: 3.70 in (94 mm); •Power: 160 hp (120 kW); •Torque: 295 lb⋅ft (400 N⋅m); •Fuel Type: Diesel; 3.0 L Pentastar V6 (China) 3.6L Pentastar V6 Complete engine specs: •Displacement: 220 CID (3,604 cc); •Stroke: 3.78 in (96 mm); •Bore: 3.27 in (83 mm); •Power: 285 hp (209 kW); •Torque: 260 lb·ft. (353 Nm); •Fuel Type: Gasoline; 3.8L EGH V6 Complete engine specs: •Displacement: 230.5 CID (3778 cc); •Stroke: 3.43 in (87 mm); •Bore: 3.78 in (96 mm); •Power: 202 hp (151 kW); •Torque: 237 lb⋅ft (321 N⋅m); •Fuel Type: Gasoline
- Power output: 285 hp
- Transmission: 4-speed Ultradrive 42RLE automatic 5-speed Mercedes-Benz W5A580 automatic 5-speed Chrysler 545RFE automatic 6-speed Chrysler NSG370 manual
- Hybrid drivetrain: Four-wheel drive

Dimensions
- Wheelbase: 2-door: 95.4 in (2,423 mm); 4-door: 116 in (2,946 mm)
- Length: 2-door: 164.3 in (4,173 mm); 4-door: 184.9 in (4,696 mm)
- Width: 2-door: 73.7 in (1,872 mm); 4-door: 73.9 in (1,877 mm)
- Height: 70.9 in (1,801 mm); 2-Door Rubicon: 72.3 in (1,836 mm)
- Curb weight: 2,760–3,340 lb (1,252–1,515 kg)

Chronology
- Predecessor: Jeep Wrangler (TJ); Iveco Massif (Spain)
- Successor: Jeep Wrangler (JL)

The Jeep Wrangler (JK) is the third generation of the Jeep Wrangler off-road vehicle. The Wrangler was unveiled at the 2006 North American International Auto Show in Detroit, the JK series 2007 Wrangler Unlimited at the 2006 New York Auto Show.

The car's body and chassis were completely redesigned during the era when Jeep was part of DaimlerChrysler. Just like the Willys MB, the CJ Jeeps and the Wranglers before it, the JK continues to have a separate body and frame, rigid live axles both front and rear, a fold-flat windshield, and can be driven without doors. Also, except optional 4x2 models, the Wrangler JK continues to have part-time four-wheel drive systems, with the choice of high and low gearing.

In addition to the traditional 2-door Jeep, the JK introduced a factory standard four-door model, called the Wrangler Unlimited. Contrary to the first, TJ-based Unlimited, and the CJ-8 "Scrambler", its wheelbase is stretched by 20 instead of 10 inches. The Wrangler Unlimited became a big sales success — by mid-2017 three-quarters of all new Wranglers listed for sale were four-door models.

== Development ==
In 2001, DaimlerChrysler commissioned development of a TJ successor under the "JK" program code for the third-generation Jeep Wrangler. Design work began almost immediately in 2001, with Mark Moushegian winning an internal design competition against Dan Zimmerman (later responsible for the 2005 Jeep Hurricane Concept) by the second quarter of 2003. In January 2004, the JK design was frozen at 31 months ahead of production, and work began on a conceptual preview.

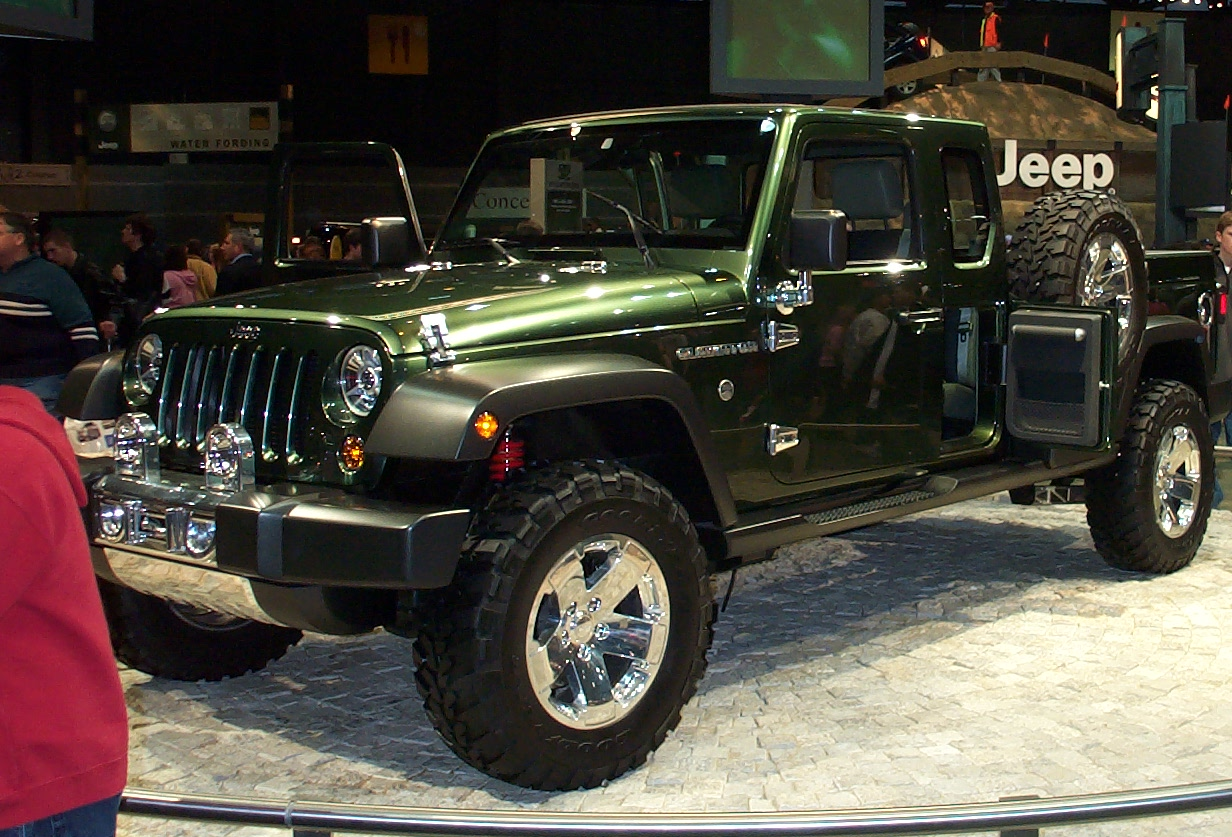
The 2005 Jeep Gladiator concept.

On November 16, 2004, Jeep released 2 CAD renderings of a Jeep pickup. On December 5, 2004, the 2005 Jeep Gladiator Concept was unveiled ahead of its January 2005 Detroit Auto Show debut, previewing many of the design elements on the incoming JK. The Wrangler JK was introduced at the 2006 North American International Auto Show with past Chrysler group CEO Tom LaSorda driving one up some steps and through a plate glass window, just as Robert Lutz had done at the show in January 1992 with the Grand Cherokee.

== Initial release ==
The JK was first available for purchase with the 2007 model year, beginning in August 2006. The 2007 model year brought a complete redesign of the Jeep Wrangler, and also a four-door model. The TJ chassis was replaced by an all-new JK platform.

The JK Wrangler has been offered from the start in two models:

- A short-wheelbase 2-door, in X, Sahara, and Rubicon trim levels.
- A long-wheelbase Unlimited 4-door, also in X, Sahara, and Rubicon trim levels.

This next-generation Wrangler was noticeably wider than the previous model, with a 3.4-inch (86 mm) wider track; and though the two-door model has a 2-inch (51 mm) longer wheelbase, it is actually 2.5 inches (64 mm) shorter in overall length than the TJ, allowing for a 44.3° approach angle and a 40.4° departure angle. With a larger factory available tire size of 32 inches, the breakover angle on the Rubicon is increased from 22.6° to 25.4°. The four-door Unlimited model has an over 20-inch (510 mm) longer wheelbase at 116 in (2,950 mm) to offer much improved rear seating room, but is nevertheless only 14-inch (360 mm) longer than the 2006 TJ Unlimited.

The JK runs almost all vehicle functions, other than steering, under computer software control. Engine, transmission, and to some extent braking are computer-controlled, as are lights and auxiliary systems. This is a first for the Wrangler. As of mid-2007, there have been three safety recalls for software fixes.

Stability control was a new safety feature for the JK Wrangler. All versions offer off-road tuned Anti-lock braking system and traction control system with electronic limited-slip differential. Standard on the Rubicon trim is a new electronic sway bar disconnect system.

A Sunrider convertible soft top is standard equipment. Also available on the JK model is an optional 3-piece modular hardtop. Although the doors can still be removed in traditional Wrangler fashion, power windows and remote power door locks were offered for the first time in a Wrangler. Another first is an available navigation system. This is the first generation of the Jeep Wrangler to have a change in the taillamps.

New features included power windows, remote power door locks, navigation, as well as electronically detachable sway bars on some models.

=== JK Wrangler Unlimited ===
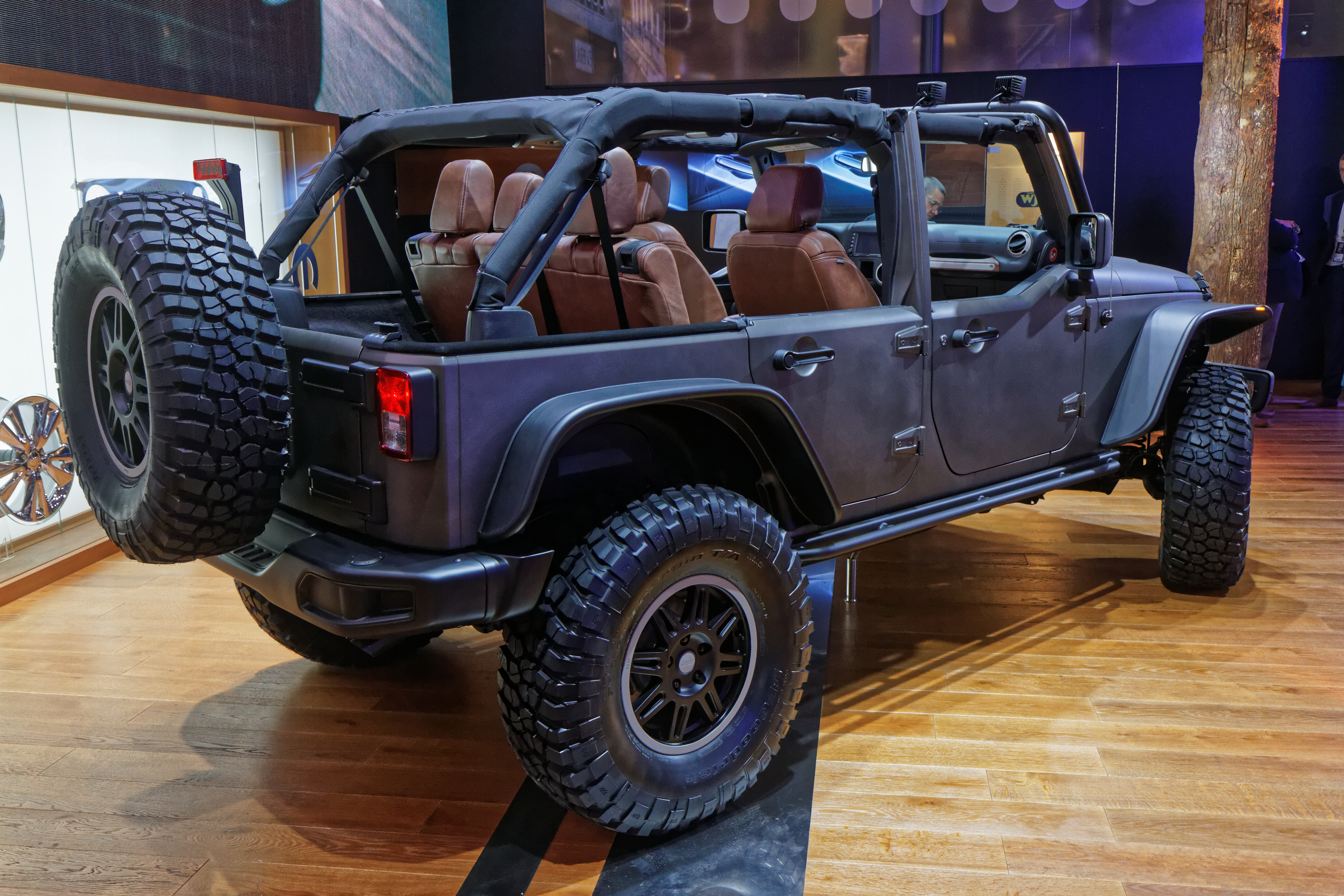
The Wrangler Unlimited was the only American four-door convertible in production before the new Ford Bronco came out in July 2021.

The JK series 2007 Wrangler Unlimited was unveiled at the New York Auto Show on April 12, 2006. It is stretched even more than the TJ model and features four doors. This change made it the last-remaining 2-door SUV in North America to gain a four-door option and made it the only four-door convertible in production. A full 20.6 in (523 mm) was added to the JK Wrangler's 95.4 in (2,423 mm) wheelbase. It hit the production line in August 2006 and was priced at $21,000.

The Unlimited has the same engine and transmission choices as a short-wheelbase JK. X and Sahara trims offer an option of 4x2 rear-wheel drive in the US. The optional 4x2 was discontinued after the 2010 model year for the Unlimited. 4-wheel drive became standard for the 2011 model year. After the Hummer H1 was discontinued in 2006, the JK Wrangler Unlimited was the only four-door convertible available in the US until the new Ford Bronco came out in July 2021.

The Unlimited offers more options and equipment than any previous Wrangler model, including standard electronic stability program and optional seat-mounted side airbags, remote keyless entry, navigation system, and Sirius Satellite Radio. The navigation and satellite systems are a part of the MyGig Entertainment system that also has a hard drive allowing for the storage of MP3 music files and pictures.

The Wrangler Unlimited became a big sales success — by mid-2017 three-quarters of all new Wranglers listed for sale were four-door models.

== Trim levels ==
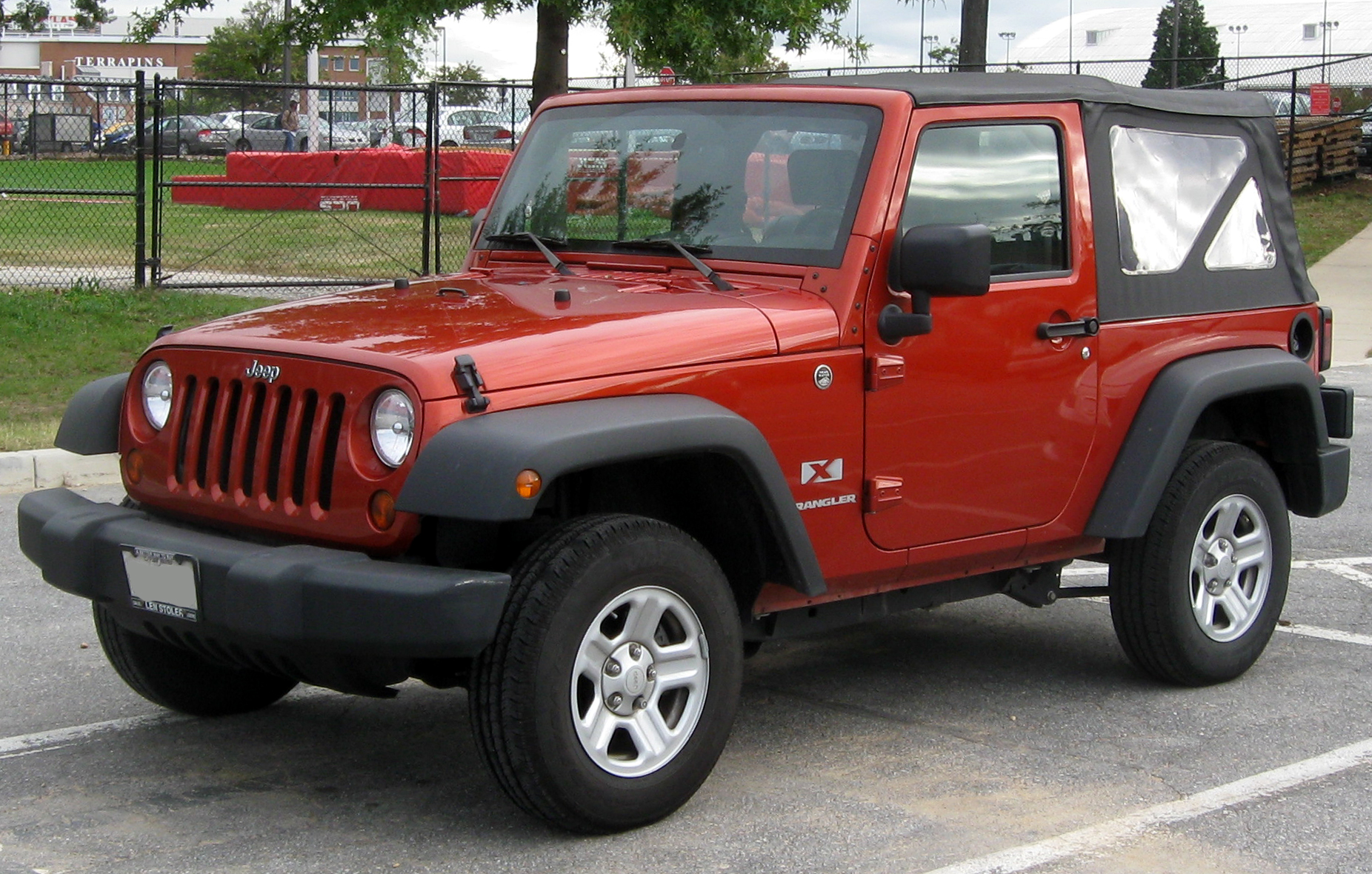
2009 Jeep Wrangler X 2-door soft-top

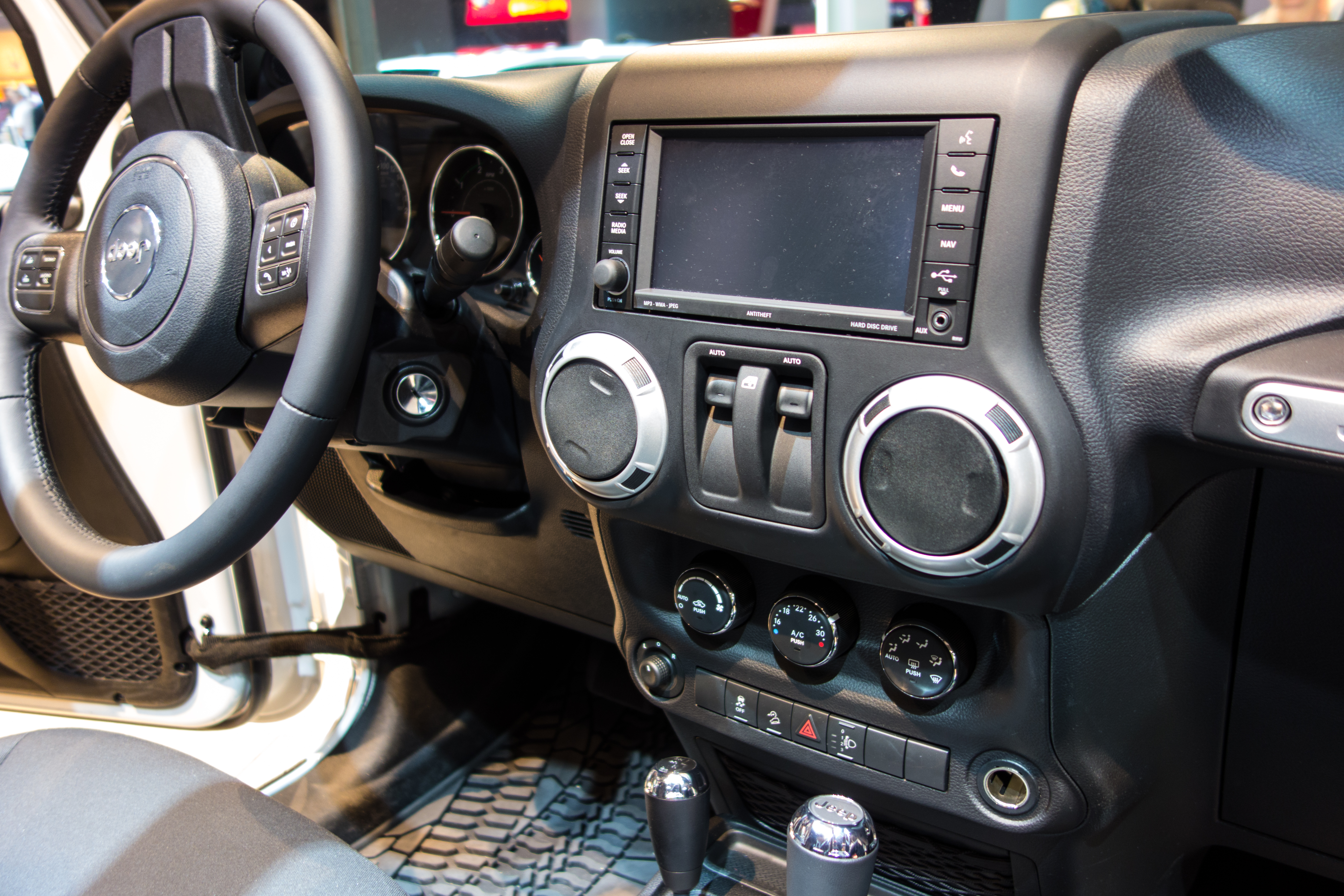
Interior

The Standard Wranglers are available in six trim packages (including 2 special editions). The Unlimited Wranglers are available in four trim packages (including 1 special edition). Most packages can be ordered with either a hard or soft top, full or half doors ("Sport" and "Rubicon" only).

The Sport base model is available in 2-door versions. It is the "bare bones" Wrangler that can be customized to a buyer's specifications by adding such options as air conditioning and other accessories. It was originally called the "Wrangler X" until 2009. Later, stain-resistant YES Essentials cloth seats replaced standard vinyl seats, an AM/FM stereo with single-disc CD/MP3 player and auxiliary audio input jack, and a full-sized spare tire and wheel came standard on this model.

The X-S model features 32-inch tires (on 17-inch wheels), air conditioning, fog lights, cruise control, driver’s seat height adjuster, removable doors, and a fold-down windshield. It can be customized to a buyer's specifications, adding such options as power windows and locks, soft or hard top, rear LSD or locker (2007 only), and other accessories. It was renamed "Sport S" in 2009. Advantages over the Sport included standard air conditioning, alloy wheels, a matching spare tire and wheel, YES essentials stain-resistant cloth seats, optional Uconnect touch-screen radios, optional seven-speaker premium sound system with subwoofer, and optional power equipment, such as power door locks and power windows, a first on any Wrangler model.

The Sahara model is the "luxury" model offering accessories such as body colored fenders, "Yes Essentials" seats (in late 2007–2008), power windows and locks and a 7 speaker infinity sound system with subwoofer, later, with Uconnect 430 (an AM/FM stereo with single CD-player with MP3 capability, SiriusXM, an aux input, Bluetooth, and USB port), among others. It also offered exterior-color fender flares, a paint-matched hard-top, and a gold 'SAHARA' decal on both front fenders.

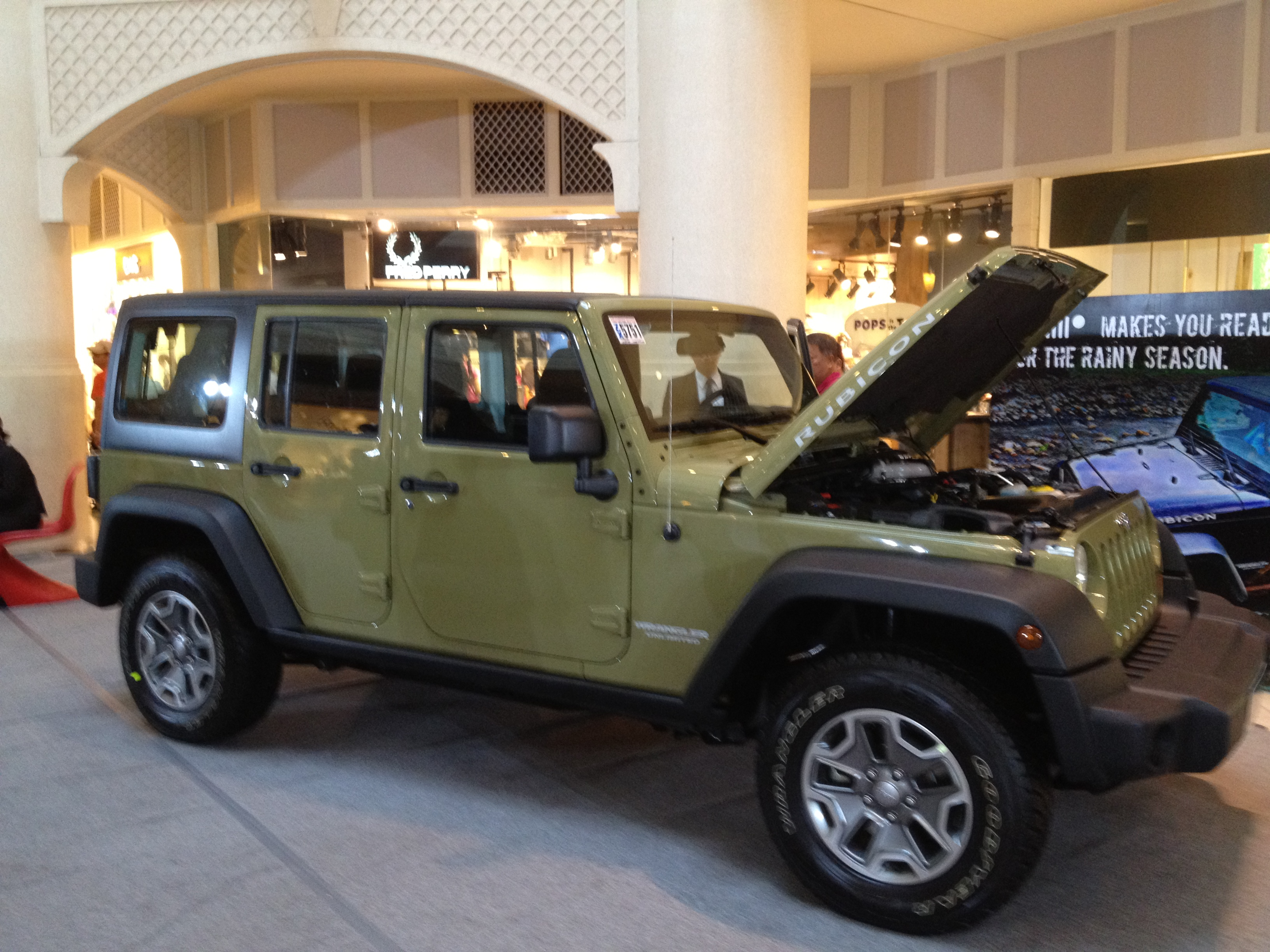
Jeep Wrangler Unlimited Rubicon Hardtop (JK, US)

The Rubicon is the "off-road ready" model, offering 32in BF Goodrich Mud-Terrain KM off-road tires with aggressive tread, seventeen-inch alloy wheels, and more. 'RUBICON' decals adorned both sides of the hood.

The Rubicon package is the dedicated "Offroad" package. Standard components of the Rubicon package include front and rear next generation Dana 44 axles with electric lockers, Rock-Trac four-wheel drive with 4:1 transfer case, rock rails, 32-spline rear axle with an 8.8-inch ring gear, 4.10 axle gearing, electric releasing sway bar, "Yes Essentials" seats (2007–08), 7-speaker infinity sound system, and any other available option can be added.

== Powertrain ==
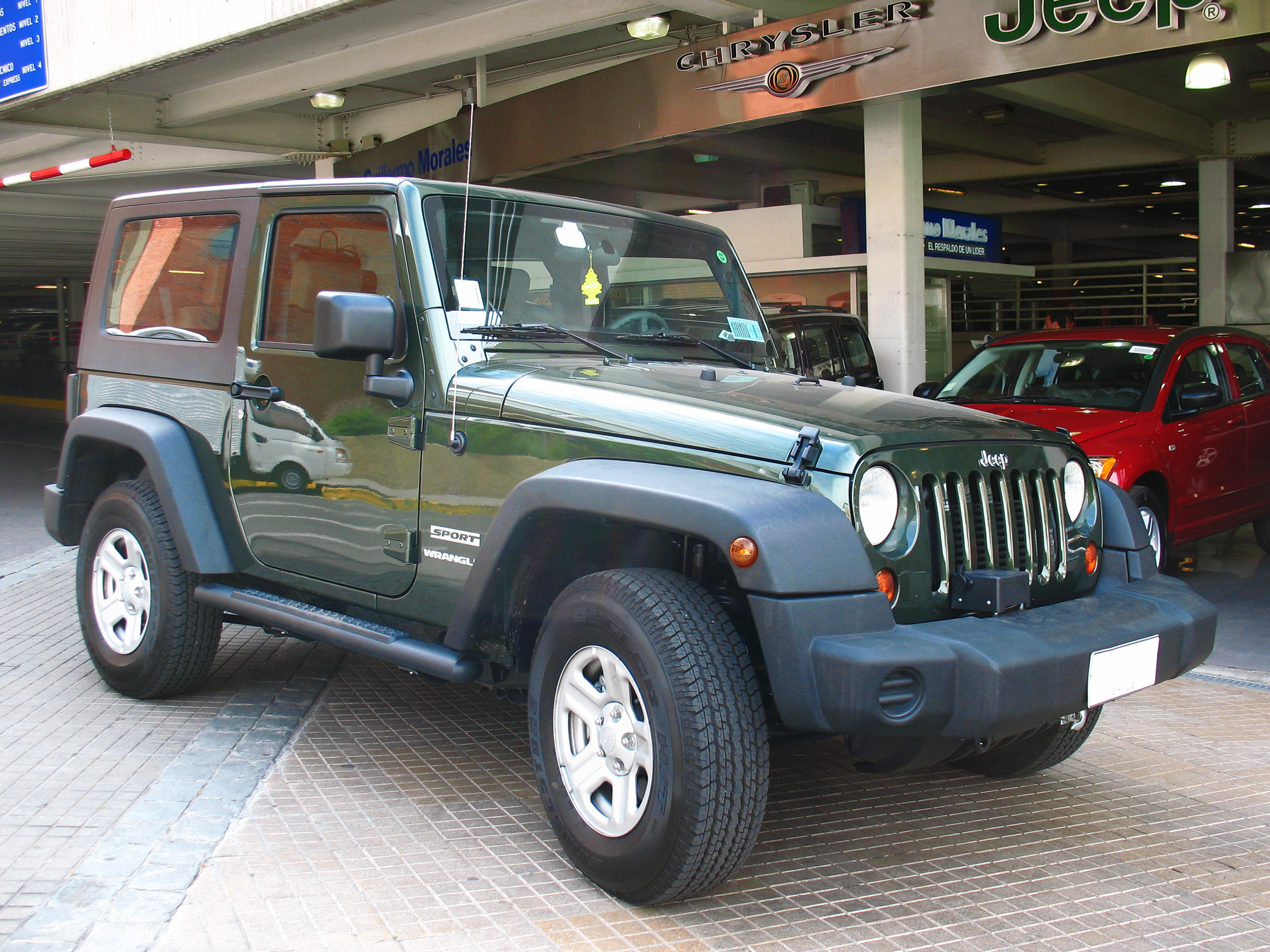
The 2.8 L diesel engine in this 2010 Wrangler Sport from Chile was never available in the U.S.

A 3.8 L EGH V6 with a displacement of 230.5 cu in (3,777 cc) producing 202 hp (151 kW) and 237 lb⋅ft (321 N⋅m) of torque was the base engine in 2007-2011 models. It replaced the AMC 242 straight-6, and was shared with the first-generation Chrysler Pacifica crossover (CUV), and Chrysler Town and Country, Dodge Grand Caravan, and Volkswagen Routan minivans. Transmission choices included a standard six-speed Chrysler NSG370 as the manual transmission, or an optional Chrysler Ultradrive 42RLE 4-speed automatic transmission.

For the 2012 model year, the 3.8L V6 was replaced by the Chrysler 3.6L Pentastar VVT V6 engine previously seen in the Jeep Grand Cherokee (WK2), now producing 285 horsepower and 260 pound-feet of torque. The NSG370 remained as the manual transmission option, while the 42RLE was replaced by a 5-speed Mercedes-Benz NAG1-family W5A580.

The RA428 2.8 L VM Motori turbodiesel straight-4 producing 177 hp (132 kW) and 302 lb⋅ft (409 N⋅m) of torque used in the Liberty KK and Dodge Nitro was offered as options outside of U.S., as it did not satisfy U.S. emission control standards for 2007. It was offered with either the NSG370 manual, or the 5-45RFE automatic transmission. In 2011 engine diesel was upgraded to A428 DOHC producing 200 PS (147 kW; 197 hp); torque: Manual transmission: 410 N⋅m (302 lb⋅ft) automatic transmission: 460 N⋅m (339 lb⋅ft) and automatic transmission was replaced by a 5-speed Mercedes-Benz NAG1-family W5A580.

The lower two levels have the Jeep Command-Trac part-time four-wheel drive system with an optional Trac-Lok limited-slip differential, while the Rubicon uses Rock-Trac, a version of the NV241 with a 4:1 low range. Electronic locking front- and rear-axles called Tru-lok are also standard on Rubicon models. (A rear locking differential was optional on X and Sahara models for 2007, then only on select X models for 2008 and 2009. From 2010 onward, the only non-Rubicon Wrangler to have the Tru-lok locking differential as an option is the 2015 Wrangler X, based on the Sahara, and the 2016 75th Anniversary Edition Wranglers.)

Engine	Year	Transmission
3.8 L EGH	2007–2011	4-speed 42RLE automatic
3.8 L EGH	2007–2011	6-speed NSG370 manual
3.6 L Pentastar	2012–2018	5-speed W5A580 automatic
3.6 L Pentastar	2012–2018	6-speed NSG370 manual
2.8 L RA 428	2007–2010	5-speed 545RFE automatic
2.8 L RA 428	2011–Present	5-speed W5A580 automatic
2.8 L RA 428	2007–2015	6-speed NSG370 manual

== Updates and editions ==
=== Postal Service ===
The Wrangler was available with factory-installed right-hand drive, targeted at U.S. Mail carriers. Rural mail boxes in the United States are serviced with the carrier behind the wheel, also useful for carriers who wish to get out of their vehicle without the risk of getting hit by traffic. For the 2007 and 2008 model years, the right-hand drive Jeep was the short-wheelbase Wrangler. For the 2009 model year, the right-hand drive Wrangler was replaced by the right-hand drive Wrangler Unlimited.

=== AIL Storm Mark III ===
An AIL Storm Mark III was set to be produced for the Israeli defense forces starting in June 2008, when the IDF was to purchase around 600 vehicles beginning in early 2011. Based on the then-new four-door Jeep Wrangler JK design, the Mark III is meant to address some of the shortfalls of the earlier Mark II. Whereas the previous vehicle was an update of the original TK Storm, the Storm III was designed from the outset with a five-door configuration. Unlike the TJ-L, the new JK Storm has a much higher maximum load capacity in part due to heavier-duty shock absorbers, springs, and axles, necessary for an armored version. It includes a standard 2.8L Italian VM Motori turbodiesel and automatic transmission.

=== 2009 model year update ===
The 2009 model added standard Hill Start Assist (HSA) to prevent rollback on graded surfaces. Trailer Sway Control (TSC) is also available to monitor vehicle movement relative to the intended path and activates the Electronic Stability Program (ESP) if the trailer begins to sway outside set parameters. Additionally, ULEV II emissions replace LEV II emissions on manual transmission-equipped vehicles.

==== Rocky Mountain Edition ====
The Rocky Mountain Edition is a special edition of the "X" model that was made for 2009 with 32-inch tires (on 17-inch wheels), a black tubular sidestep, a 6-disc in-dash changer, and visual enhancements such as body colored fenders, which were optional.

=== 2010 update ===
The 2010 model added a new, easier-to-fold/open soft top, standard UConnect infotainment systems on models equipped with the MyGig radio, and new sun visors that offer more coverage than the old models, as well as integrated vanity mirrors.

==== Islander Edition ====
The Islander Edition is a special edition of the "Sport Base" model made in 2010 with "32"ish-inch tires, Islander edition seats, rubber slush mats, a black tubular sidestep, and visual enhancements such as a blue accented leather steering wheel.

==== Mountain Edition ====
The Mountain Edition is a special edition of the "Sport Base" model made for 2010 with 32-inch tires (on 17-inch wheels), black tubular sidestep, black tail light protectors, and special edition seats, as well as visual enhancements like black grid and hood decals, a black fuel filler door, and graphite dash enhancements. This edition was also available in 4 doors, based on the more equipped "Sport" trim instead of the "Sport Base" trim.

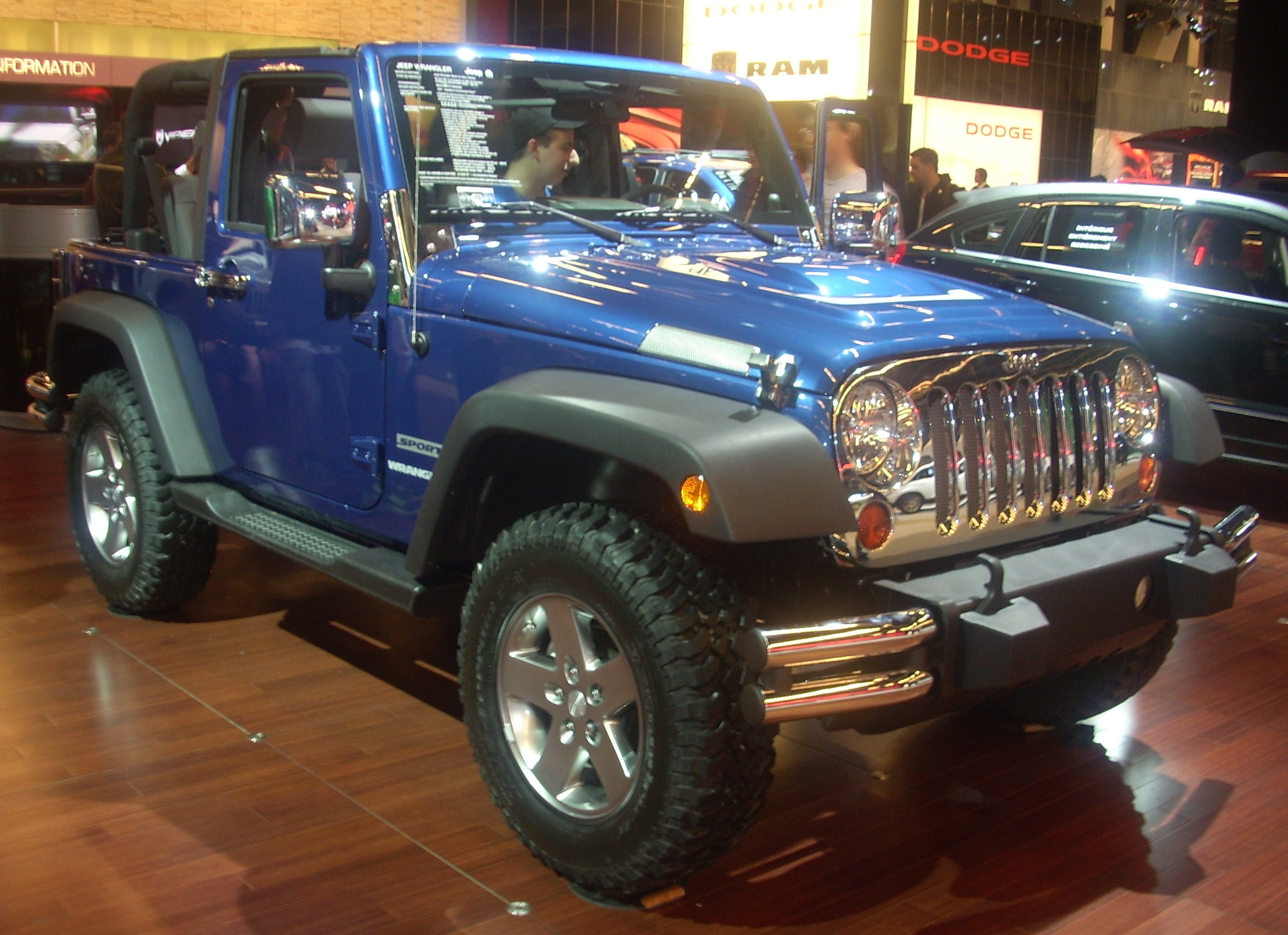
2010 Jeep Wrangler Mopar accessories modifications

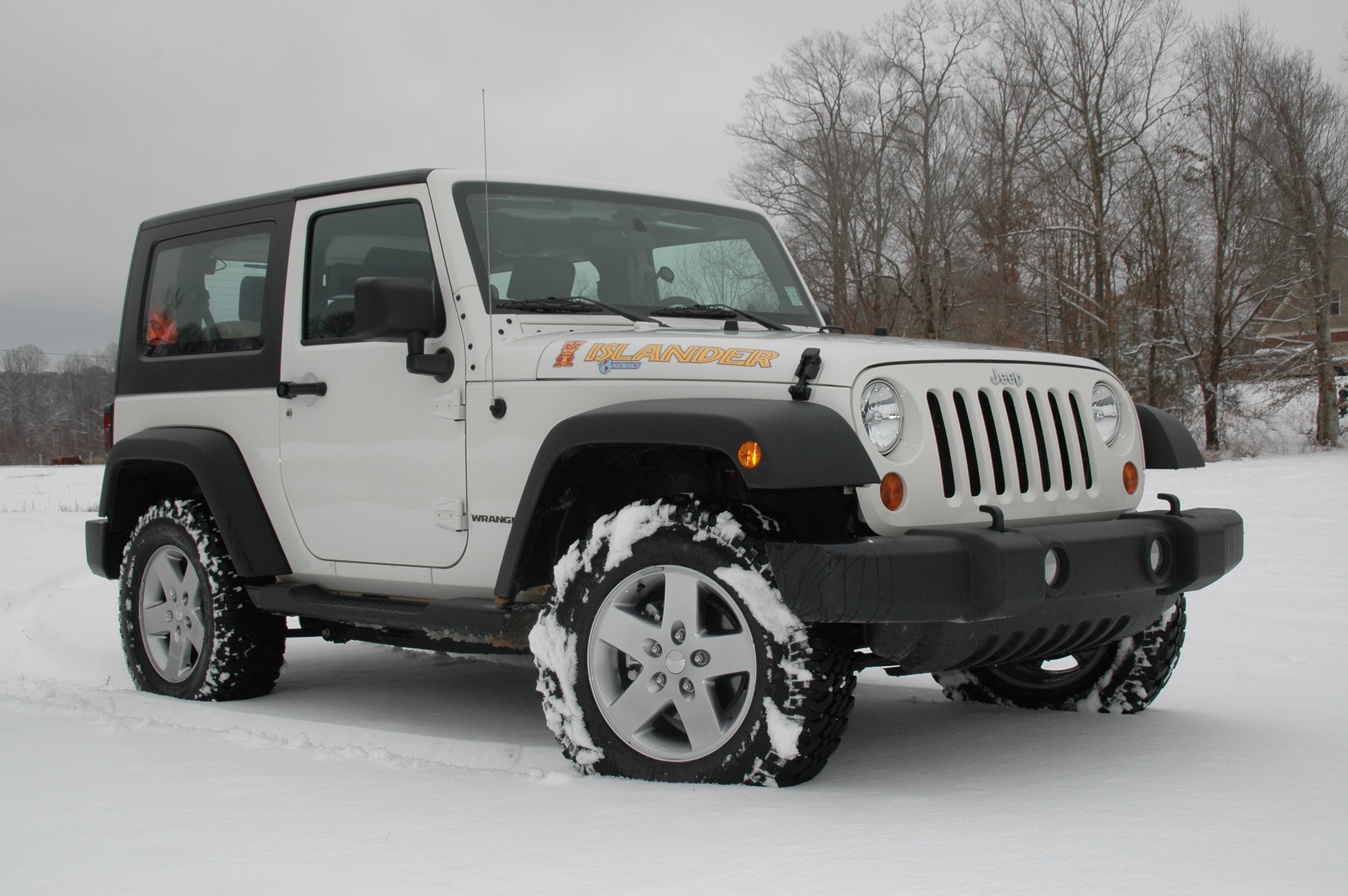
2010 Jeep Wrangler 2-door hard-top Islander Edition

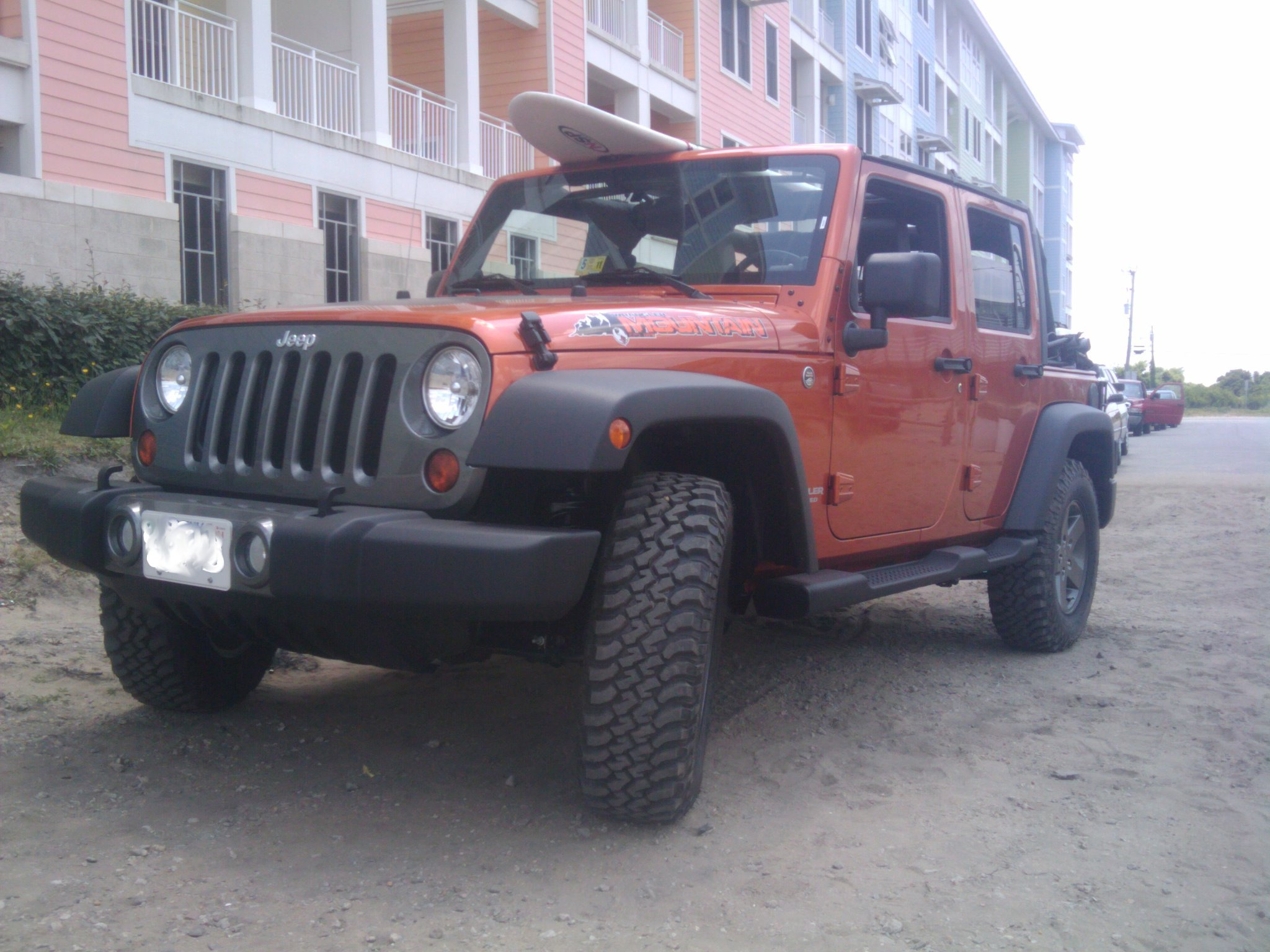
2010 Unlimited Mountain Edition

=== 2011 model year refresh: redesigned interior ===
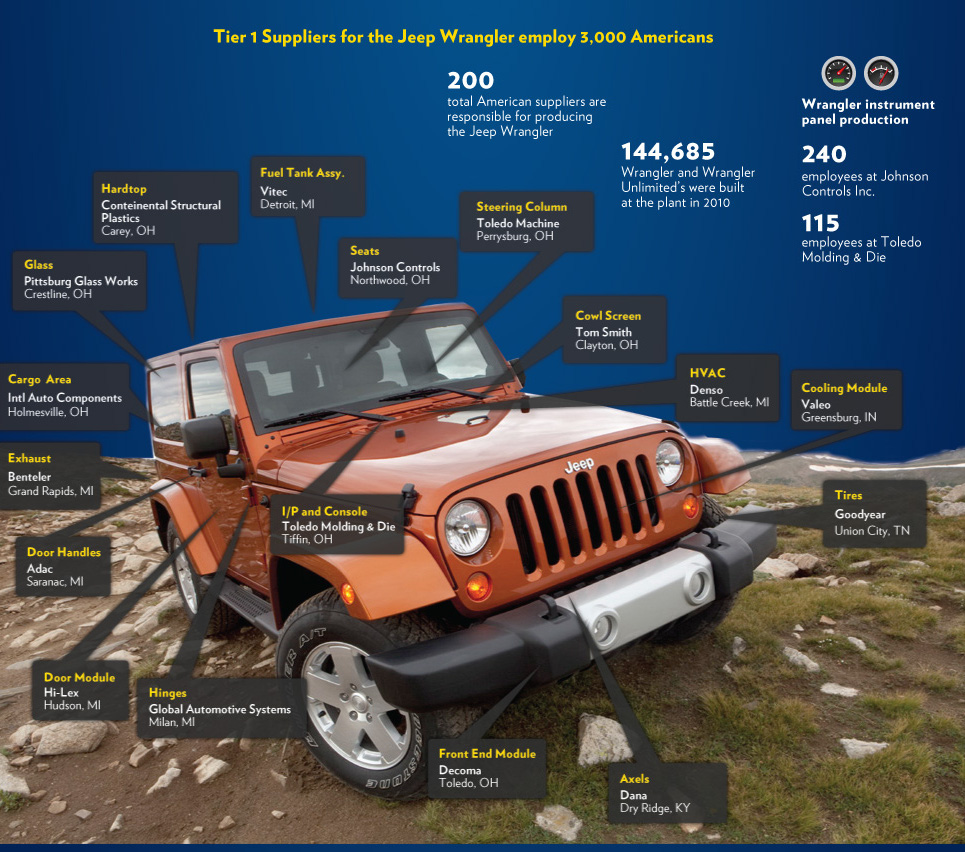
Graphic showing the various suppliers used for the 2011 Wrangler.

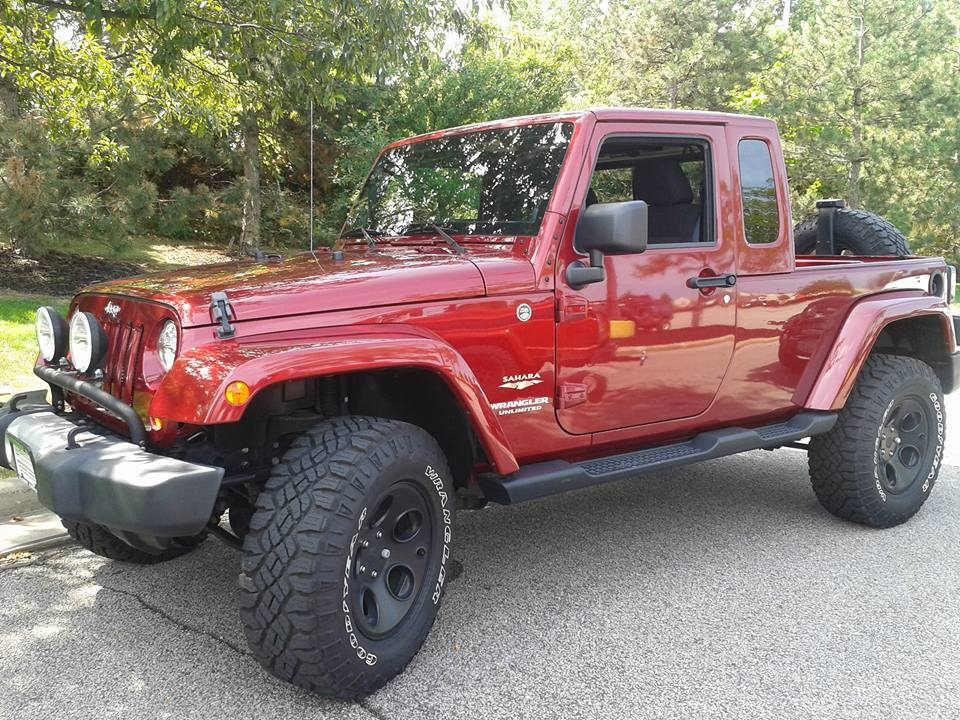
Mopar Jeep JK-8 pick-up, based on the Wrangler Unlimited.

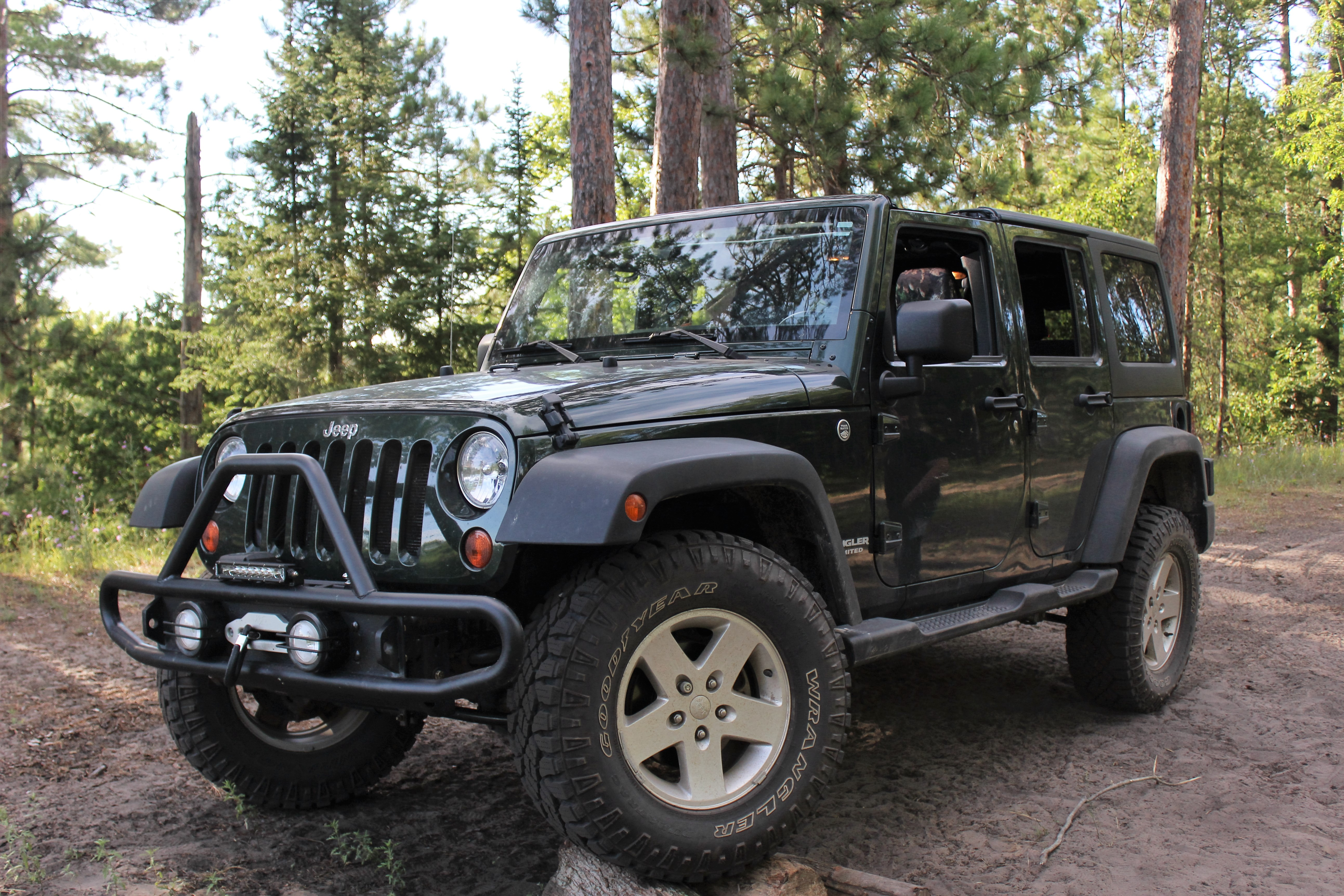
A dark green 2011 Jeep Wrangler.

For 2011, the Wrangler and Wrangler Unlimited received a mid-cycle restyling. The interior was fully redesigned to include a new steering wheel with integrated Bluetooth voice command, cruise control, and audio system controls, an available enhanced Electronic Vehicle Information Center (EVIC), the Uconnect hands-free Bluetooth phone system with voice control for the vehicle's audio system, as well as Bluetooth stereo audio streaming via A2DP, updated radios with available Garmin-based GPS navigation and SiriusXM Satellite Radio and Travel Link, a new passenger side grab bar with embossed "Jeep" and "Since 1941" insignias, new interior door skins (panels), a new power window control switch panel, new climate controls and vents, and new seat fabrics (heated front seats and leather-trimmed seating surfaces were also available for the first time in a Wrangler or Wrangler Unlimited). New aluminum-alloy wheel options also became available, and the transmission shift lever for the automatic transmission and manual four-wheel-drive (4X4) system were both redesigned. Even with the Wrangler and Wrangler Unlimited being new, the 3.8L V6 gas engine and four-speed automatic transmission would not be replaced by the 3.6L Pentastar VVT V6 gas engine and five-speed automatic transmission until the 2012 model year.

==== 70th Anniversary Edition (MY2011) ====
The 70th Anniversary Edition is a special package based on the Sahara model to commemorate the 70th Anniversary of Jeep. This package is available for the 2011 model year on both Wrangler and Wrangler Unlimited models. Features include: Black/Dark Olive (or Black) leather seats with perforated leather inserts and Chestnut accent stitching and piping, Leather steering wheel with Chestnut accents, Berber floor mats with Chestnut binding, Mopar brushed aluminum sill plates, Door armrest and center console in Dark Olive (or Black) with Chestnut accent, Unique 18-inch polished wheels, Automatic shift knob with satin chrome cap and bezel, Satin chrome HVAC rings, front doorpulls and grab handle, 70th Anniversary logo on radio screen, Unique cluster overlay and needles, and 70th Anniversary badges throughout.

==== JK-8 Independence pick-up kit ====
In 2011 MOPAR made a kit available, to convert a Jeep Wrangler Unlimited into a pickup, called JK-8 Independence. The kit turns the Jeep into a two-seater with a 50 inches long steel bed, and the half hard-top works with Freedom Top panels.

=== 2012 model year update ===
==== Jeep Wrangler 3.6-liter Pentastar V-6, Jeep Wrangler Arctic ====
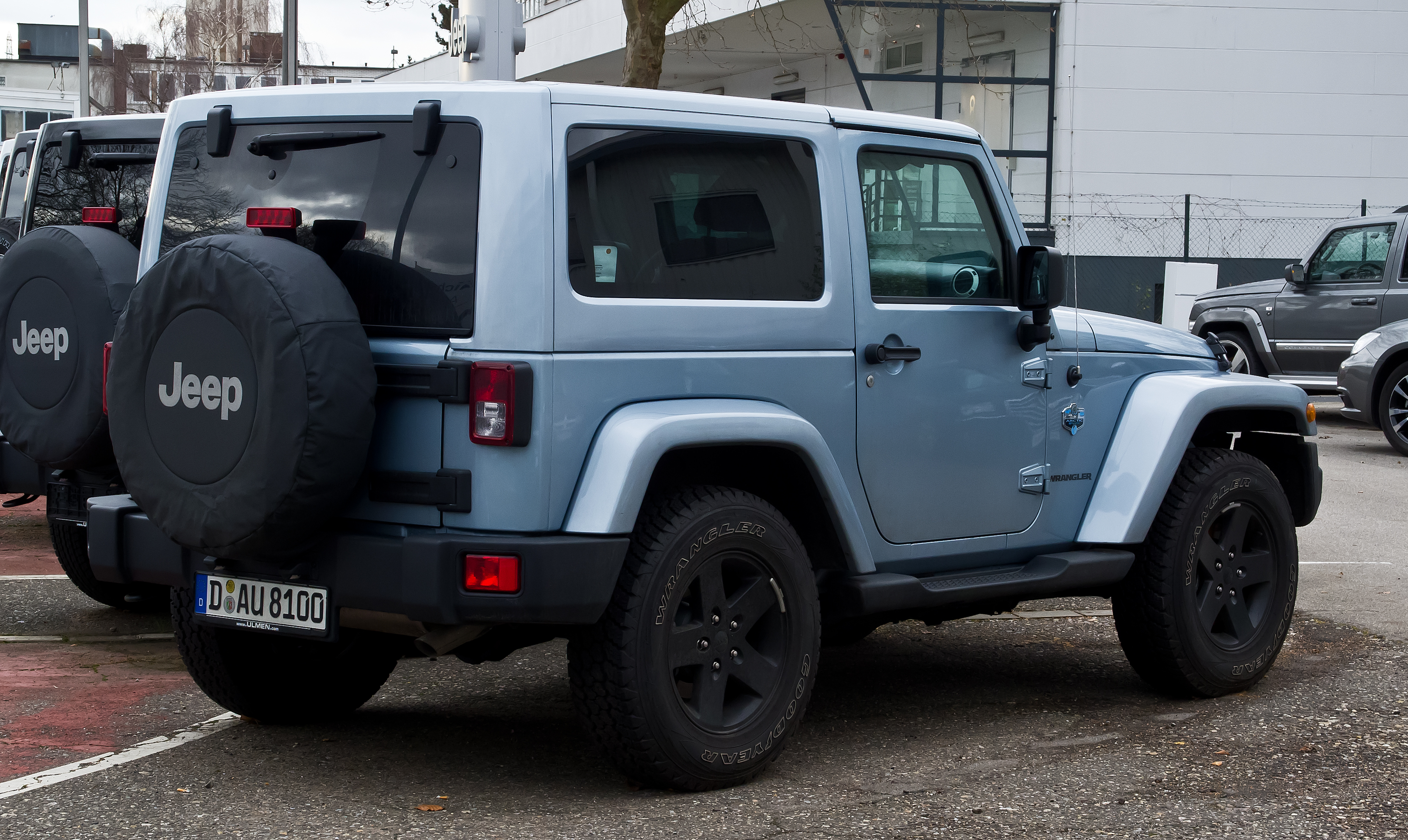
2012 Wrangler Arctic (Germany)

The 2012 model, as confirmed by Chrysler CEO Sergio Marchionne during the 2010 third-quarter sales announcement, received a version of Chrysler's newest V-6 engine known as Pentastar. The version used in the 2012 Wrangler and Wrangler Unlimited produces 285 horsepower and 260 lb-ft of torque. Fuel economy for the 2-door model is rated at 17 mpg City / 21 mpg Highway.

Jeep Wrangler Arctic is based on Jeep Wrangler Sahara, with Arctic badge, decal recalling the Yeti, unique black 17-inch wheels, original Mopar accessories, 3.6-liter Pentastar V-6 petrol engine with the automatic five-speed transmission, or 2.8-liter turbo diesel engine with a six-speed manual or five-speed automatic transmission.

The vehicles were unveiled at the 64th International Frankfurt Motor Show.

The Wrangler Unlimited Altitude edition is a package that starts with a Sahara model and adds black exterior treatment, including the front badge, the wheel spokes, the fuel door, and a hood sticker. Inside, the vent trim, door pulls, steering-wheel spokes, and passenger grab handle are rendered in black. Stitching is done in red. The Altitude Wrangler paint colors are cherry red, black, white, or silver, and all include a body-colored hardtop.

European models of the Jeep Wrangler were introduced in Jeep dealerships starting in November 2011. Early models include Sport, Sahara, and Rubicon trim levels of the Jeep Wrangler and Wrangler Unlimited. The Arctic model was introduced in Jeep dealerships in the first quarter of 2012 (for Jeep Wrangler and Wrangler Unlimited).

==== Call of Duty: MW3 Special Edition (2012) ====
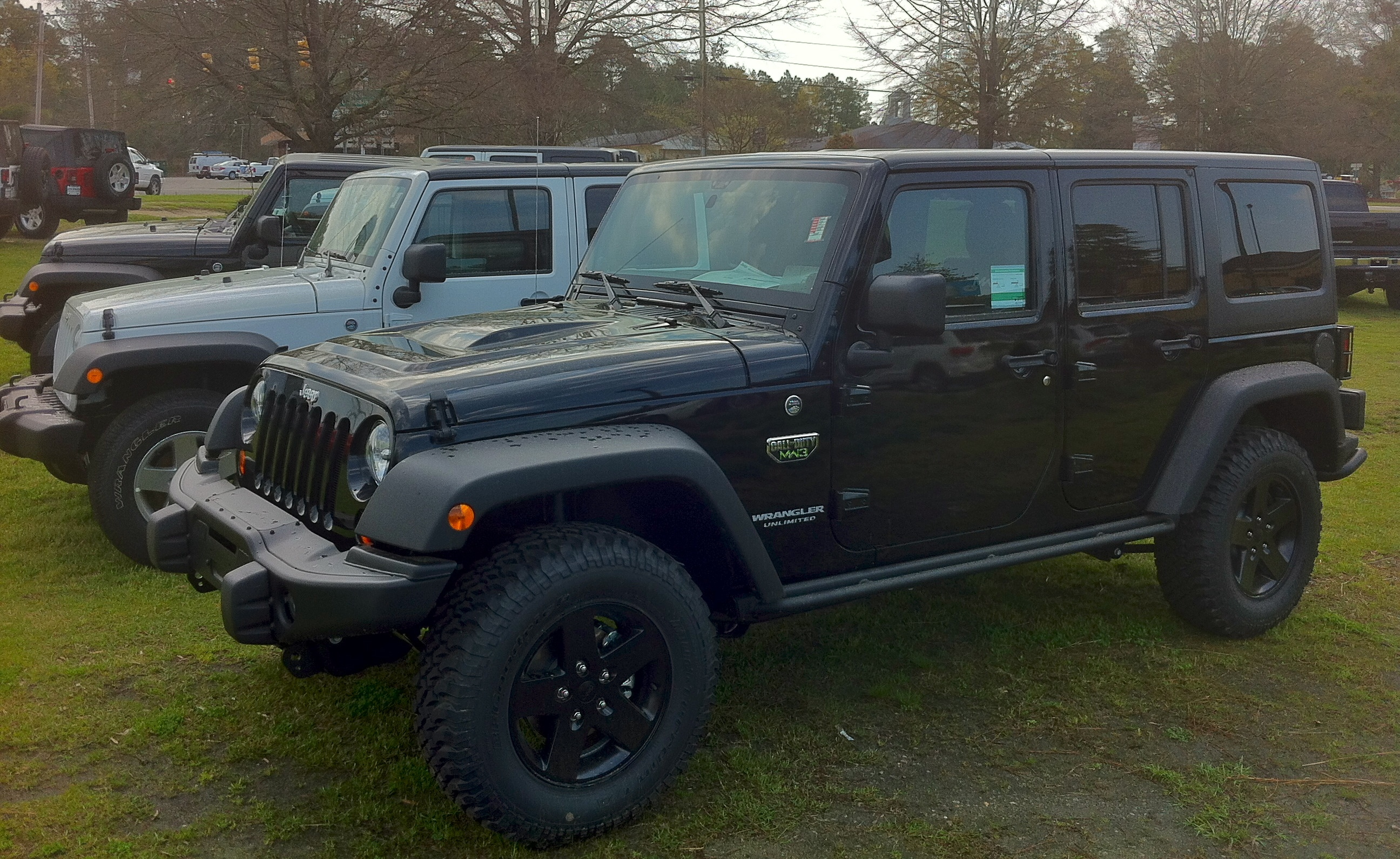
Unlimited Call of Duty MW3 version

A version of the 2012 model year Jeep Wrangler and Wrangler Unlimited Rubicon, inspired by Activision's Call of Duty video games, was available. Equipment included Rubicon wheels finished in semi-gloss black, black or bright silver body color, "Call of Duty: MW3 Special Edition" graphics on the front fenders and spare tire cover, modified sculpted hood also from AEV (no heat vent), an AEV winch-ready (less the winch plate) front bumper and AEV rear bumper, rock rails, taillamp guards and a fuel-filler door from Mopar accessories, 32-inch off-road tires, live axles with locking differentials in the front and rear, a two-speed transfer case, model-specific black seats with accent stitching and "Call of Duty" logos, unique gauge cluster graphics, dashboard serialized plaque, dashboard grab handle with logo, accent stitching on arm rest, console lid, and steering wheel, as well as Mopar slush floor mats and a rear cargo mat (Unlimited only) with logos.

The vehicles arrived at Jeep showrooms in November 2011.

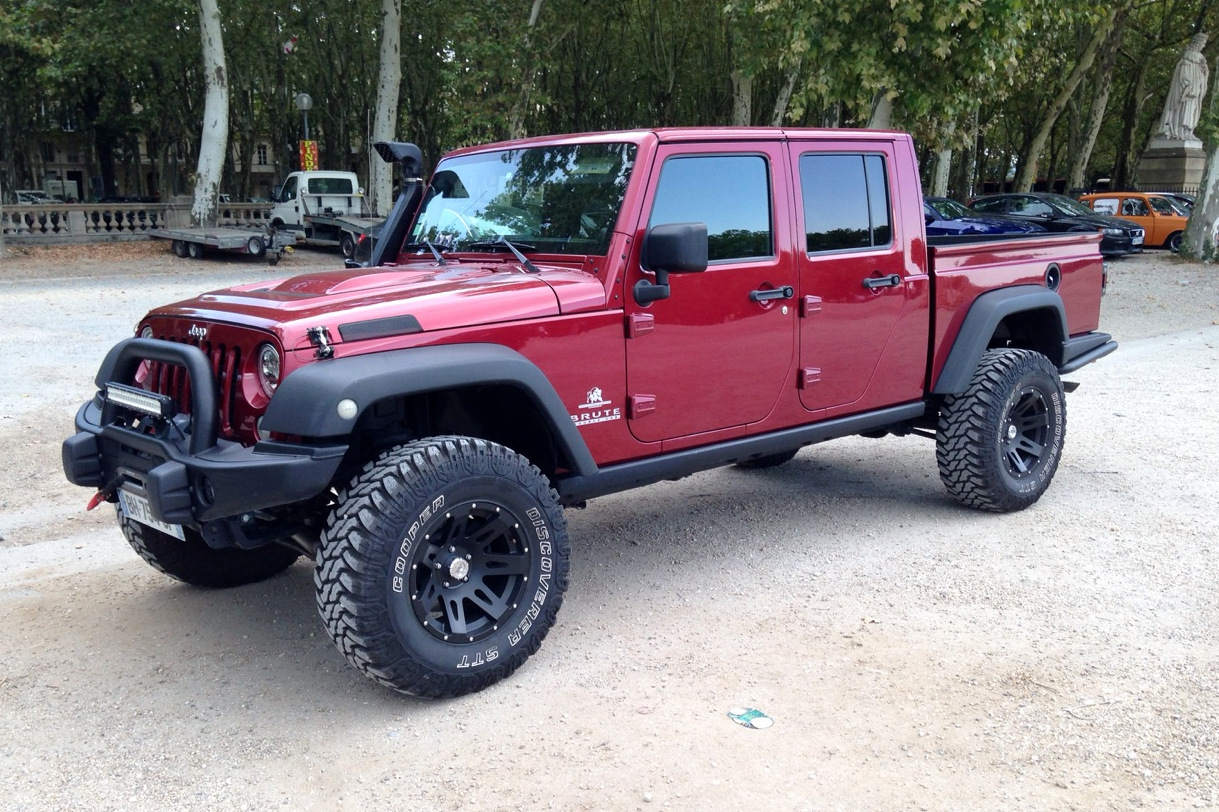
Wrangler Unlimited 'Brute' double-cab pick-up by AEV Conversions

==== Equipment ====
Mopar produced over 250 accessories for the 2012 Jeep Wrangler.

==== Double cab pick-up conversion ====
Since about 2012, the company American Expedition Vehicles offered an extended wheelbase, double-cab pickup conversion of the Unlimited, called the 'Brute'. Inspired by the Land Rover Defender 130, the Brute has a 139-inch wheelbase and an overall length of 216 inches. After four years of production, the Brute was retired.

=== 2013 model year update ===
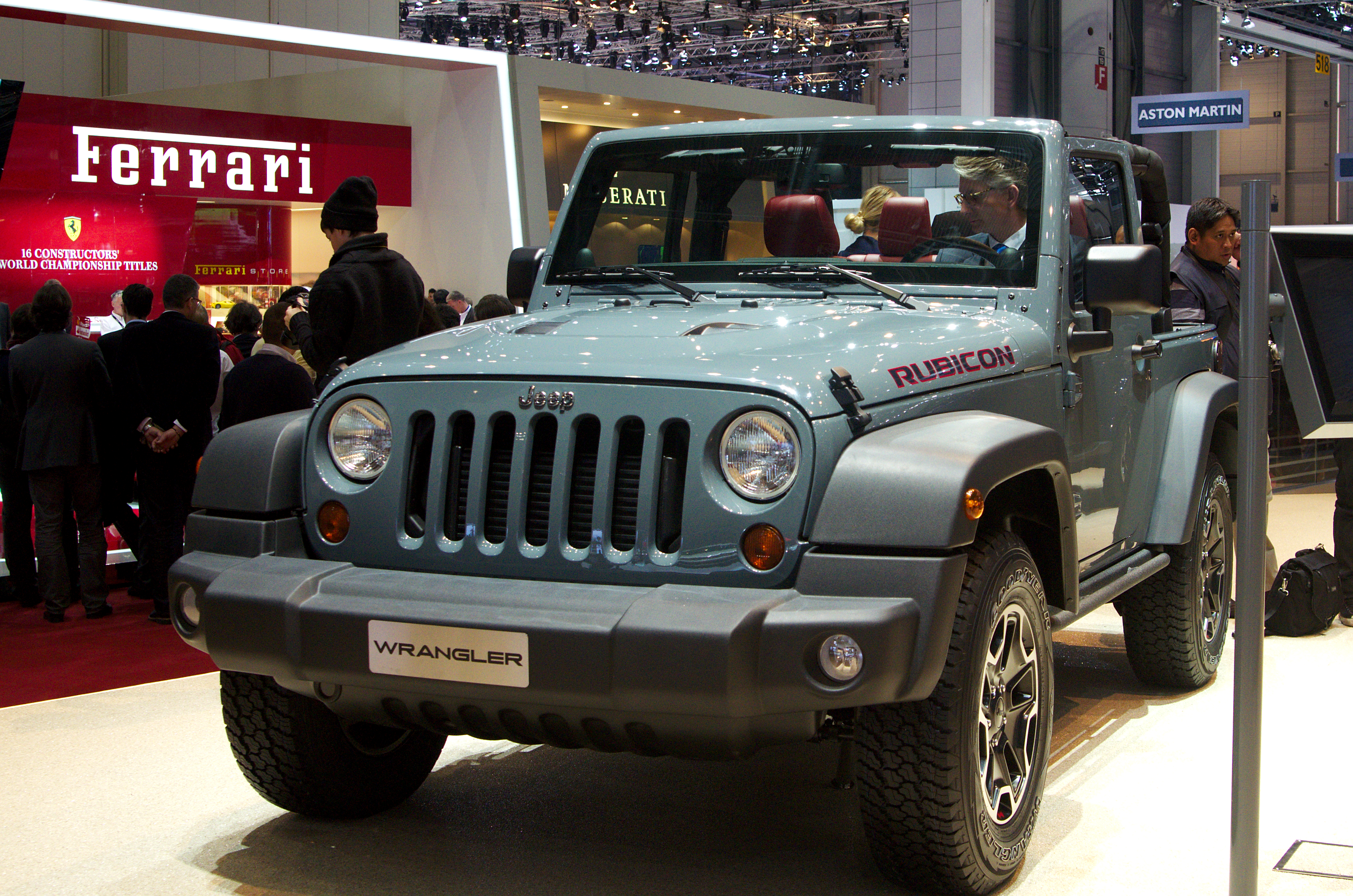
2013 Jeep Wrangler at the Geneva Motor Show

The Wrangler series has received the following update/improvements: newly contoured seats and trim, a lever for one-handed rear-seat folding (previously a two-handed operation), ambient cabin lighting, and the return of the long-awaited second windshield washer nozzle.

==== 2013 Moab edition ====
Similar to the 2012 "Call of Duty" version, it was named in recognition of the mountainous Utah east-central region that plays host to the annual Moab Easter Jeep Safari. The newest addition to the Wrangler lineup was aimed at bridging the gap between Rubicon and Sahara style.

Available for both Wrangler models, the Moab’s uniqueness was its distinguishing exterior features, which included the steel bumpers front and rear from AEV (less the winch plate), rock sliders on the sills, tail light guards, front skid plate, black fuel filler door, and a modified sculpted hood also from AEV (no heat vent). Color choice was limited to black, white, and a quartet of signature hues: Gecko, Dune, Crush, and Rock Lobster, with fender flares in matte black only.

Other components and options were as follows: A limited-slip rear differential is standard and a locking unit is optional, 32" Goodyear Silent Armor tires on black-painted versions of the same wheels found on the 2013 Rubicon, Wrangler’s standard 2.72:1 transfer case (no option for a Rubicon 4:1), a soft canvas top cut from the same cloth as the Chrysler 200 Convertible’s and optional color matching hard top.

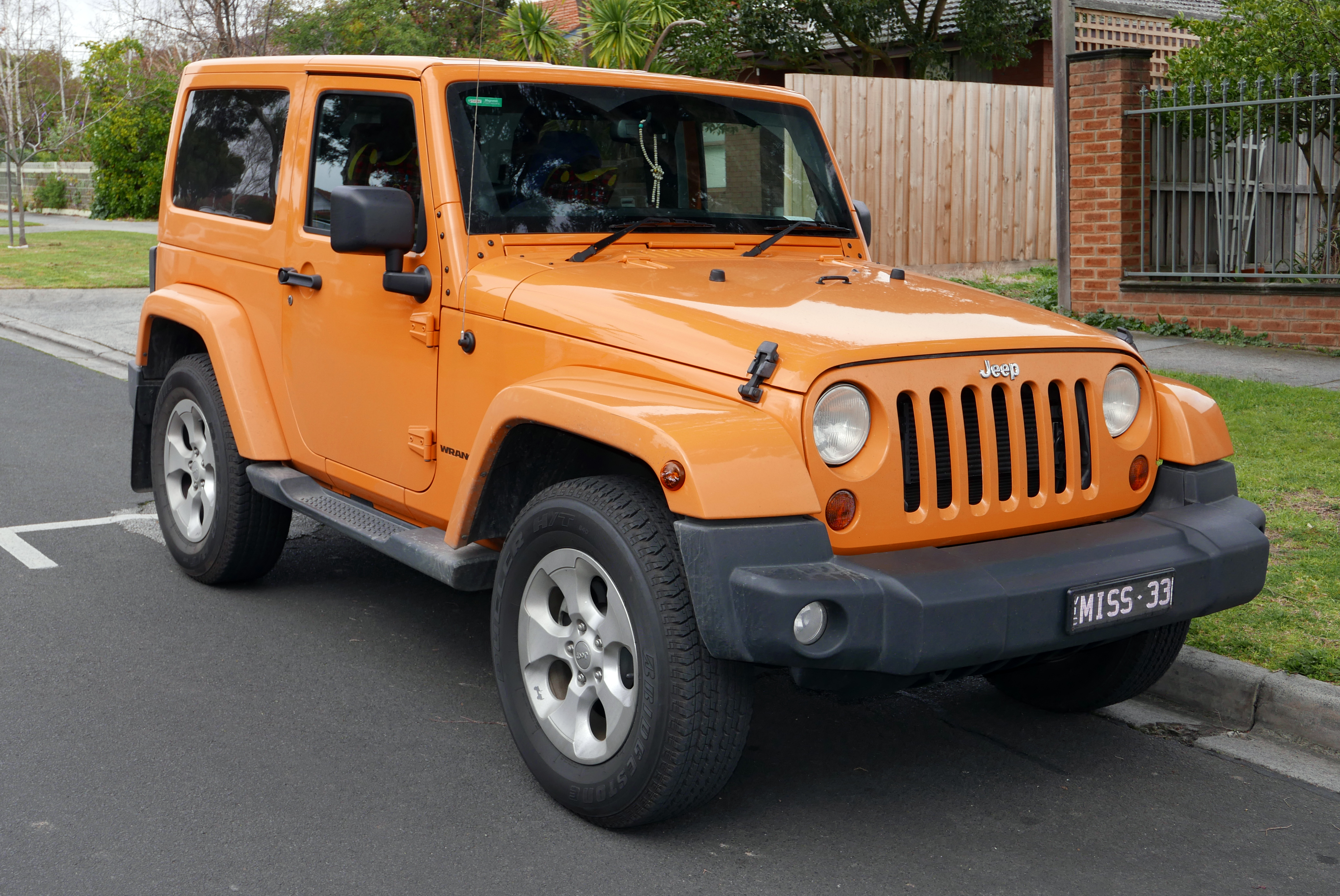
Australian 2013 Wrangler Overland.

==== 2013 Overland edition ====
For Australia, the year revived the Jeep 'Overland' name, with the introduction of a premium/luxury version, featuring, for instance, leather-trimmed seats, automatic headlights, and a reversing camera. Overland Models are Right Hand Drive Sahara Edition Models for the Australian Market.

==== Production ====
The 2013 Jeep Wrangler and Jeep Wrangler Unlimited are built in the Toledo Supplier Park in Toledo, Ohio.

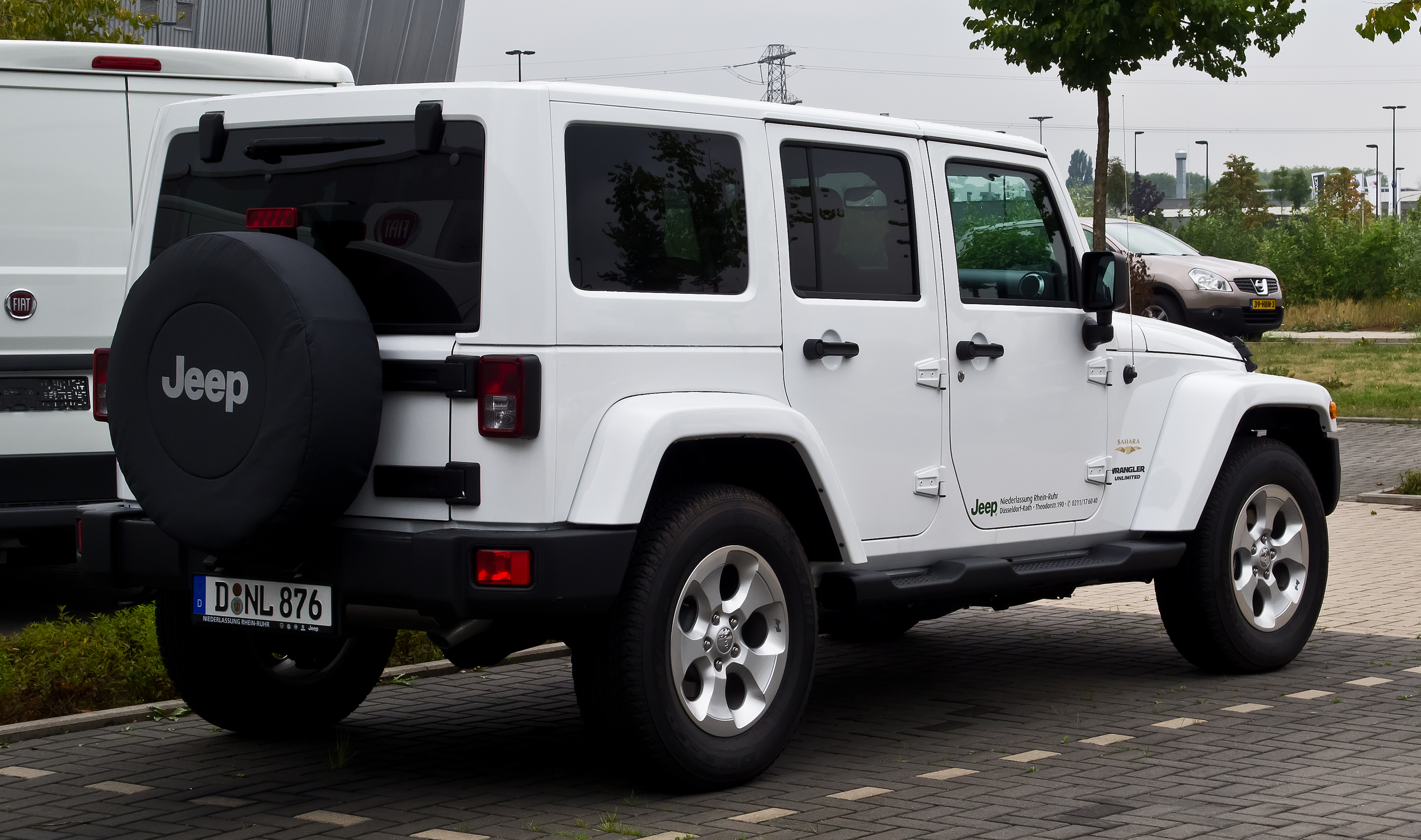
2013 Wrangler Unlimited 2.8 CRD Sahara

As of May 17, 2013, Chrysler Group's Toledo (Ohio) Assembly Complex produced its one-millionth JK model, a 2013 Jeep Wrangler Rubicon 10th Anniversary Edition, to be delivered to a customer in Sarasota, Florida.

==== Marketing ====
As part of the 2013 Jeep Wrangler Rubicon 10th Anniversary Edition launch, the Jeep X Games Avalanche Scramble sweepstakes campaign featured a 2013 Jeep Wrangler Rubicon 10th Anniversary Edition grand prize and 3 'X Games Aspen 2013' prizes.

=== Commando Jeep ===
The Commando Jeep is a commercial off-the-shelf (COTS) tactical vehicle based on the Jeep Wrangler with a factory-installed turbodiesel engine operating on JP-8 and global diesel fuels. It is a vehicle modified for use by airborne forces, special operations forces, and combat engineers.

=== 2014 model year refresh ===
General changes to the Wrangler include a new Trail Kit (two D-rings, a tow strap, gloves and a bag to store the items), clear park lamps and turn signal indicators replace the amber units, 6 new body colors (Amp’d, Anvil, Copperhead, Flame Red, Granite Crystal and Hydro Blue (Freedom Edition only)) for total of 10.

Changes to Sport models include the introduction of an optional UConnect 6.5-inch touchscreen radio with hard drive storage and SiriusXM Radio, an optional 32-inch Tire and Wheel Group (semi-gloss black 17-inch Rubicon aluminum wheels, BF Goodrich KM LT255/75R17 off-road tires).

==== Special editions ====
Wrangler X Frankfurt, Jan. 14th, 2015,(FcA) Jeep launches the Limited special edition based on the Jeep® Wrangler Sahara. The Wrangler X special models are available in the colors Black and Baja Yellow, each combined with a black interior in a leather/fabric combination and gray decorative stitching. Typical X features are the very striking bonnet with Powerdome, two air inlets, and large stickers in Alpine design, the black fuel flap and running boards from MOPAR, 18-inch light alloy wheels in gloss black with silver edge, black surrounds of headlights and radiator grille slots, as well as fender extensions in body color. The Wrangler X special models are equipped as standard with the so-called Dual Top, which consists of the three-part hardtop in body color with darkened windows and the Sunrider® Soft Top. Typical X-details also in the interior: polished white interior accents and the popular MOPAR rubber floor mats with tire profile look. The X takes over the functional equipment from the Wrangler Sahara and therefore scores with a leather multifunction steering wheel, Uconnect 735 navigation system with 30 gigabytes of hard disk, Bluetooth hands-free system, Alpine audio system with CD/MP3/DVD drive and subwoofer. In addition, the Wrangler X has a very effective automatic climate control and side airbags at the front. The Wrangler X Special Edition, based on the Sahara, is available as a three-door Wrangler and a five-door Wrangler Unlimited, each powered by a 2.8-litre four-cylinder turbo diesel (200 hp) or a 3.6-liter V6 petrol engine (284 hp), both with a five-speed automatic transmission. The Wrangler Unlimited X models have a towing capacity of 2,000 kilograms (3.6 V6) or 2,200 kilograms (2.8 turbodiesel).

Rubicon (X) Edition

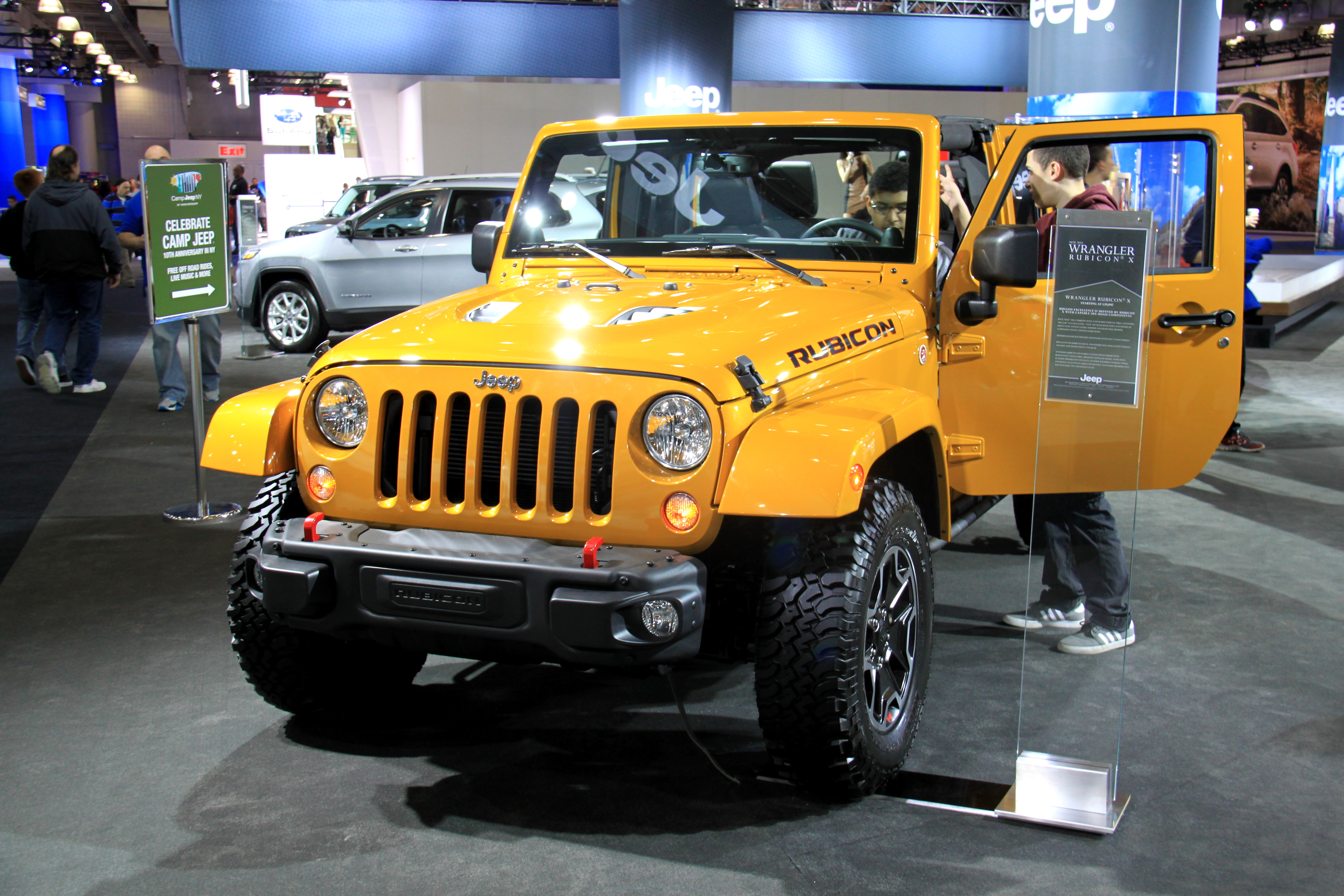
The new for 2014 Rubicon X trim shown at the years New York International Auto Show

Available as a two-door Wrangler or four-door Wrangler Unlimited, the Rubicon X is a version of Rubicon with electronic-locking front and rear Dana 44 axles, Rock-Trac transfer case with a "4-Low" ratio of 4:1, 4.10 front/rear axle ratio Tru-Lok locking differentials, six-speed manual transmission, BF Goodrich KM 255/75R17 tires, 17-inch Rubicon aluminum wheels painted satin black with polished faces and a red Jeep Wrangler 'icon' logo on the inside pocket, black front and rear steel off-road bumpers, front steel bumper featuring removable end caps and a winch-capable design, a dual-intake Power Dome hood, red tow hooks, Mopar rock rails, Mopar black fuel filler door, a red-silhouette "Rubicon" decal on both sides of the hood, Premium Sunrider soft top (optional black three-piece Freedom hard top or body-color hard top), Black leather seats, seat heaters for the front passengers, a unique gauge cluster features Rubicon X exclusive styling and a premium Electronic Vehicle Information Center (EVIC) with added read-outs such as oil pressure, transmission and coolant temperatures, digital speed and individual tire pressure; passenger grab handle with Quick Silver accents that are also found on the vent rings, steering wheel spokes and door pulls; Mopar slush mats, unique axle locker, sway-bar disconnect switches.

Dragon and Polar Editions
New limited edition trim packages include the Wrangler Dragon edition, which includes a black three-piece hard top, Bronze Satin Gloss paint with Dragon decals, and unique 18-inch wheels and front fascia. Jeep introduced the Polar Edition Wrangler in 2014 which was available in 2-door and 4 door and came in three distinct colors; Hydro Pearl Blue, Billet Silver Metallic, and Bright White. In addition to the new colors, the Polar Edition came with options including automatic climate control and heated seats to supplement the black leather seats. The Polar Edition has some similarities to the Sahara, such as body colored fender flares, and also came standard with a body colored hard top. The Polar Edition is equipped with a standard Trac-Lok limited-slip rear differential and offers an electronic locking rear differential as an option.

Freedom Edition
A new Freedom Edition is a modified Wrangler Sport with 3 unique body colors ('Hydro Blue', 'Billet Silver', and 'Black and Dune'). The package includes a Mineral Gray painted grille, a unique interior and exterior with "Oscar Mike" badging throughout, body colored fenders with silver-painted 17-inch alloy wheels, and rock rails with black tail lamp guards. The interior includes black seats with tectonic fabric, and a French Silver accent stitching steering wheel.

European models were set to go on sale in the first quarter of 2014. UK models include only 2.8-litre turbo diesel engine with automatic transmission.

==== Equipment ====
New Mopar Jeep Performance Parts and Accessories included 2014 Jeep Wrangler Trail Rated Kit, 4:10 Dana 44 front and rear axles (for 2007–2014 Wrangler), Hardtop Headliner (for 2007 and later Wrangler), Black Grille (with hood seal and a matching black Jeep badge), Side Visor.

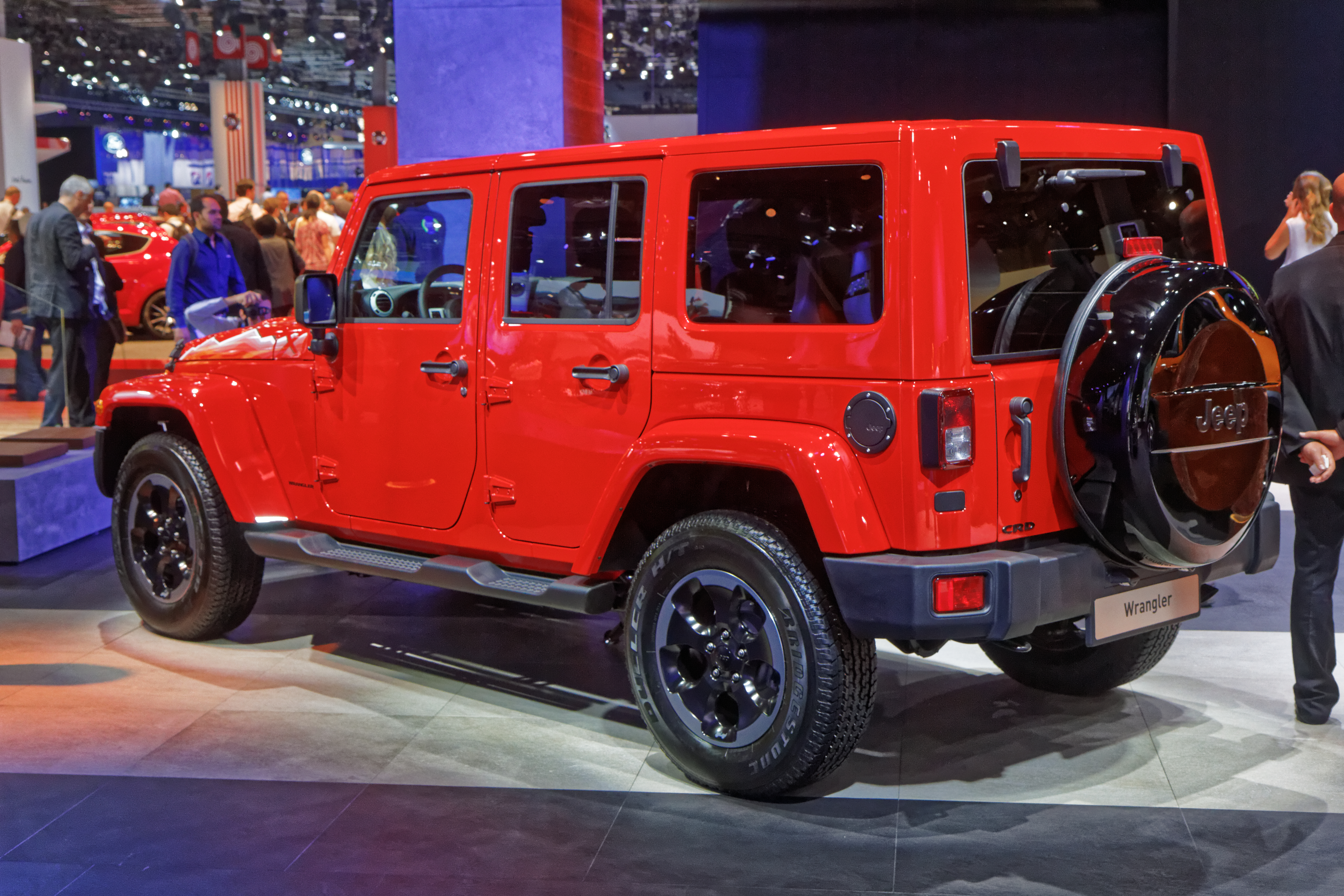
2015 Jeep Wrangler Unlimited in Firecracker Red and body-colored hardtop, shown at the 2014 Paris Motor Show.

=== 2015 model year update ===
Changes for 2015 include the new paint colors (including, new for 2015, Tank (dark olive green), Sunset Orange, Copper Brown, Baja Yellow, and Firecracker Red.) and trim packages (Sport, Willys Wheeler, Sahara, Rubicon, and Rubicon Hard Rock levels.)

Changes include a package that bundles steel wheels with 31-inch tires for Sport models, and a Torx tool set that's standard on all models, allowing owners to remove the doors or lower the windshield wherever they are. On base Wrangler and Wrangler Unlimited models, sixteen-inch gloss black-painted styled steel wheels were available to replace the standard Sparkle Silver-painted styled steel wheels.

The 2015 Wrangler received a new nine-speaker, 552-watt Alpine premium audio system (replacing the previously-standard seven-speaker, 368-watt Infinity premium amplified audio system with subwoofer) with amplifier and rear cargo floor-mounted all-weather subwoofer that was optional on all trim levels. All trim levels included a newly-standard eight-speaker audio system (replacing the previously-standard six-speaker audio system). The eight-speaker system replaced the instrument panel-mounted tweeter speakers with 3.5-inch mid-range speakers, and also added a pair of 3.5-inch mid-range speakers to the rear sound bar.

The Jeep Wrangler was released in India on 30 August 2016. Alongside the Grand Cherokee, the Wrangler was the first model to be sold directly by Jeep in the country. Jeeps were previously built under licence by Mahindra in India since the 1960s.

=== 2018 model year update ===
For 2018, the Jeep Wrangler and Wrangler Unlimited JK were sold alongside the all-new 2018 Jeep Wrangler (JL) and Wrangler Unlimited JL to meet demand for the Wrangler until the all-new JL model went on sale in early 2018. The two models would be produced at separate plants at the Toledo Complex in Toledo, Ohio. To distinguish between JK and JL models, a Wrangler JK decal was applied to the front fenders of the vehicle. There were very minimal changes from the 2017 model year Wrangler and Wrangler Unlimited (aside from the 75TH Anniversary Edition models), with the same trim levels and special editions being offered, although a new Golden Eagle special edition models were also offered, with bronze-painted accents and aluminum-alloy wheels and special front fender decals. The Golden Eagle was also the only Wrangler JK to be offered with a beige top option.

== Military Jeep J8 (2007–present) ==
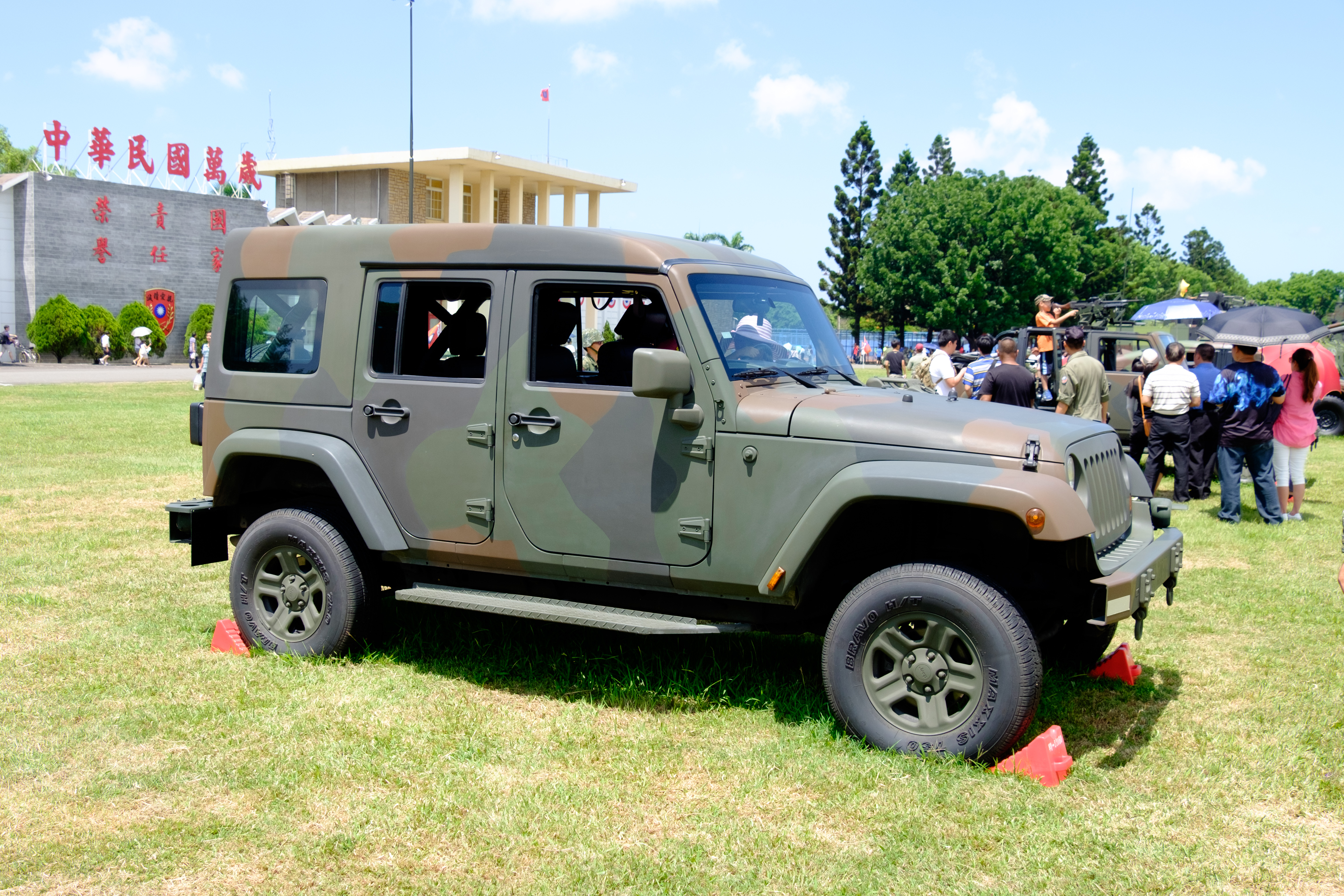
Republic of China Army Wrangler Unlimited

On September 13, 2007, at the Defence Systems and Equipment International trade show, Chrysler LLC unveiled a Wrangler Unlimited version designed for military use dubbed the J8. The unarmored Jeep J8 is equipped with larger brakes, axles, and suspension components than the civilian version and has a payload capacity of 1,339 kg (2,952 lb). The J8 also differs from the civilian model by utilizing heavy-duty rear leaf springs for carrying heavier payloads. The Jeep J8 is powered by a VM 2.8-liter (169 CID) four-cylinder turbo-diesel engine that produces 118 kW (158 hp) and 400 N⋅m (295 lb⋅ft) of torque, providing towing capability of up to 3,500 kg (7,700 lb). The engine is mated to a five-speed automatic transmission. The J8 also features a unique air-intake system with special filtration and a hood-mounted snorkel that enables the J8 to wade in water up to 762 mm (30 in) deep and tackle sandstorm conditions for up to five hours. Available as a two-door with an extended pickup bed for personnel or equipment transport, or a four-door multipurpose vehicle, it may be produced with numerous vehicle-body and seating configurations in either right-hand- or left-hand-drive. Targeted at armed forces in overseas markets, the J8 is not available in the United States because it will not meet U.S. emissions requirements. The J8 will be produced in Egypt.

== Safety ==
ANCAP test results* Jeep Wrangler 3.6L V6 2 door variants (2012)
Test	Score
Overall	4 /5 stars
Frontal offset	10.51/16
Side impact	16/16
Pole	Not Assessed
Seat belt reminders	1/3
Whiplash protection	Not Assessed
Pedestrian protection	Poor
Electronic stability control	Standard

== End of production ==
Production of the Jeep Wrangler JK and Wrangler Unlimited JK ceased on Friday, April 27, 2018, after twelve years, as dealer stock of the 2018 Jeep Wrangler (JL) ramped up. The current Jeep Wrangler JK plant received a complete retooling to produce the JL-based Jeep Gladiator (JT), which debuted for the 2020 model year.
