= Jeep Liberty =

Compact SUV

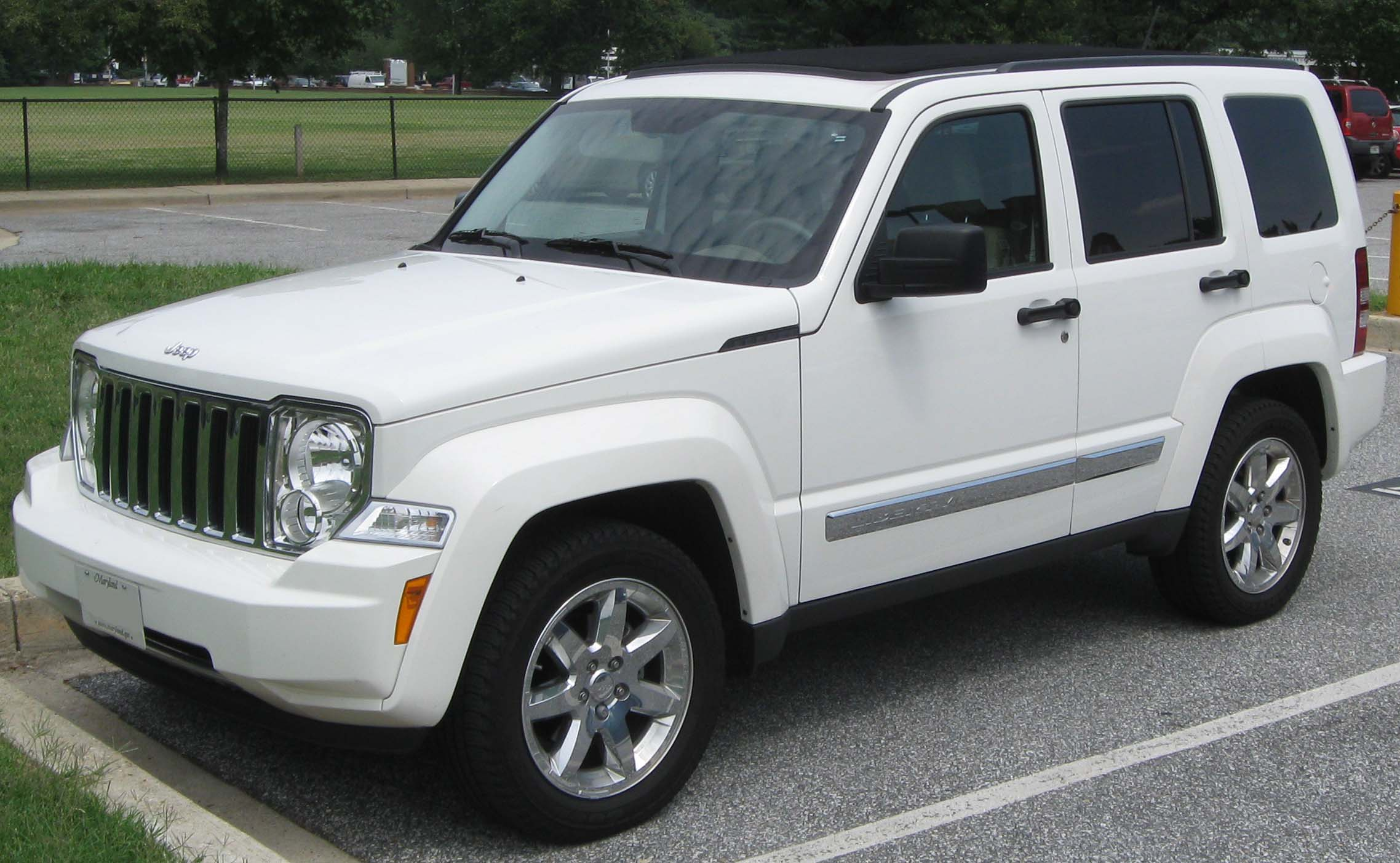
- 2008 Jeep Liberty

Overview
- Manufacturer: Jeep (Note: DaimlerChrysler (2001–2007); Chrysler LLC (2007–2009); Chrysler Group LLC (2009–2012))
- Also called: Jeep Cherokee (outside North America)
- Production: 2001 – August 2012
- Model years: 2002–2012
- Assembly: United States: Toledo, Ohio, (Toledo North Assembly Plant); Egypt: Cairo (AAV); Venezuela: Valencia, Carabobo (Carabobo Assembly)

Body and chassis
- Class: Compact SUV
- Body style: 4-door SUV
- Layout: Front-engine, Rear-wheel drive / Four-wheel drive
- Chassis: Unibody
- Related: Dodge Nitro; Jeep Commander

Chronology
- Predecessor: Jeep Cherokee (XJ)
- Successor: Jeep Cherokee (KL)

The Jeep Liberty is a four-door unibody compact SUV manufactured and marketed by Jeep for model years 2002–2012 over two generations, internally designated the KJ (2002–2007) and KK (2008–2012), respectively. Both generations were marketed globally, including as the Jeep Cherokee outside North America.

Introduced as a replacement for the Cherokee (XJ), the Liberty was priced between the Wrangler and Grand Cherokee and was the smallest of the 4-door Jeep SUVs until the car based 4-door Compass and Patriot arrived for 2007. Both generations were assembled at the Toledo North Assembly Plant in the United States and other countries, including Egypt and Venezuela. The KK generation was manufactured alongside the closely related Dodge Nitro. Production ended in August 2012.

The Liberty was superseded by the Jeep Cherokee.

== First generation (KJ; 2001–2007) ==
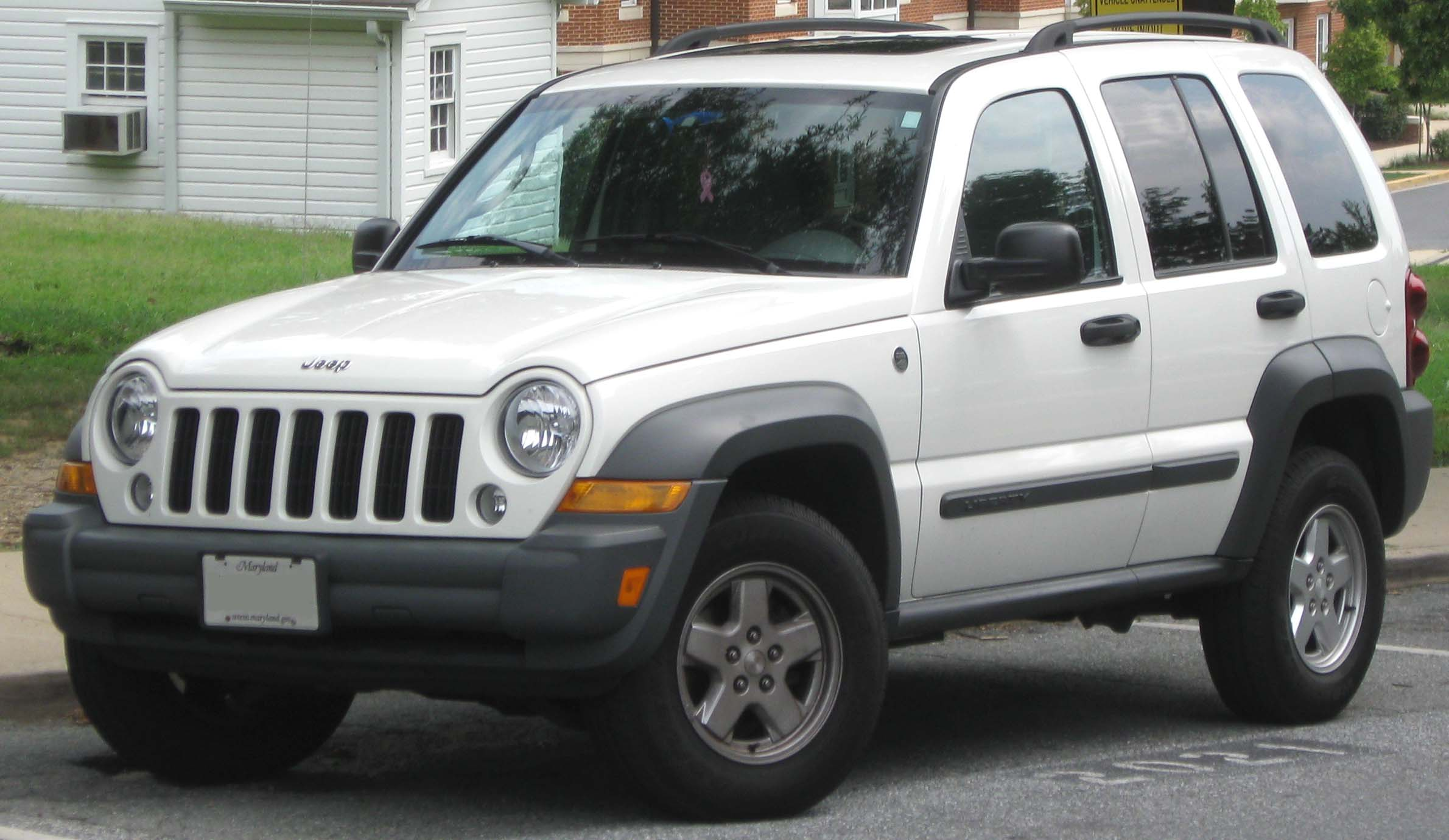
2005–2007 Jeep Liberty. This model was produced between July 2004 and June 2007.

Inspired by styling from the Dakar and Jeepster concept vehicles, the Liberty replaced the discontinued Jeep Cherokee.

The Liberty was the first Jeep vehicle to use rack and pinion steering, and was the first Jeep to use the two then-new PowerTech engines; the 150 horsepower (110 kW) 2.4 L straight-4, which was discontinued in 2006, and the 210 horsepower (160 kW) 3.7 L V6, as well as a short-lived 2.8 L VM Motori turbo diesel (2005-2006 only). The Liberty was also the first Jeep vehicle to use an independent front suspension since the 1963-1965 Jeep Wagoneer.

Three trim levels were initially offered; Limited, Renegade and the base Sport. All were made available with either 2WD or 4WD. In 2005, all models received a minor facelift. The 2005, 2006 Renegade and 2005 Rocky Mountain Edition Liberties received an exclusive flat hood and taller grille. In 2007, the Renegade trim level was replaced with the Latitude and lost the Renegade trim's unique hood and grille. The Liberty was nominated for the North American Truck of the Year award for 2002, though safety recalls persisted.

== Second generation (KK; 2007–2012) ==
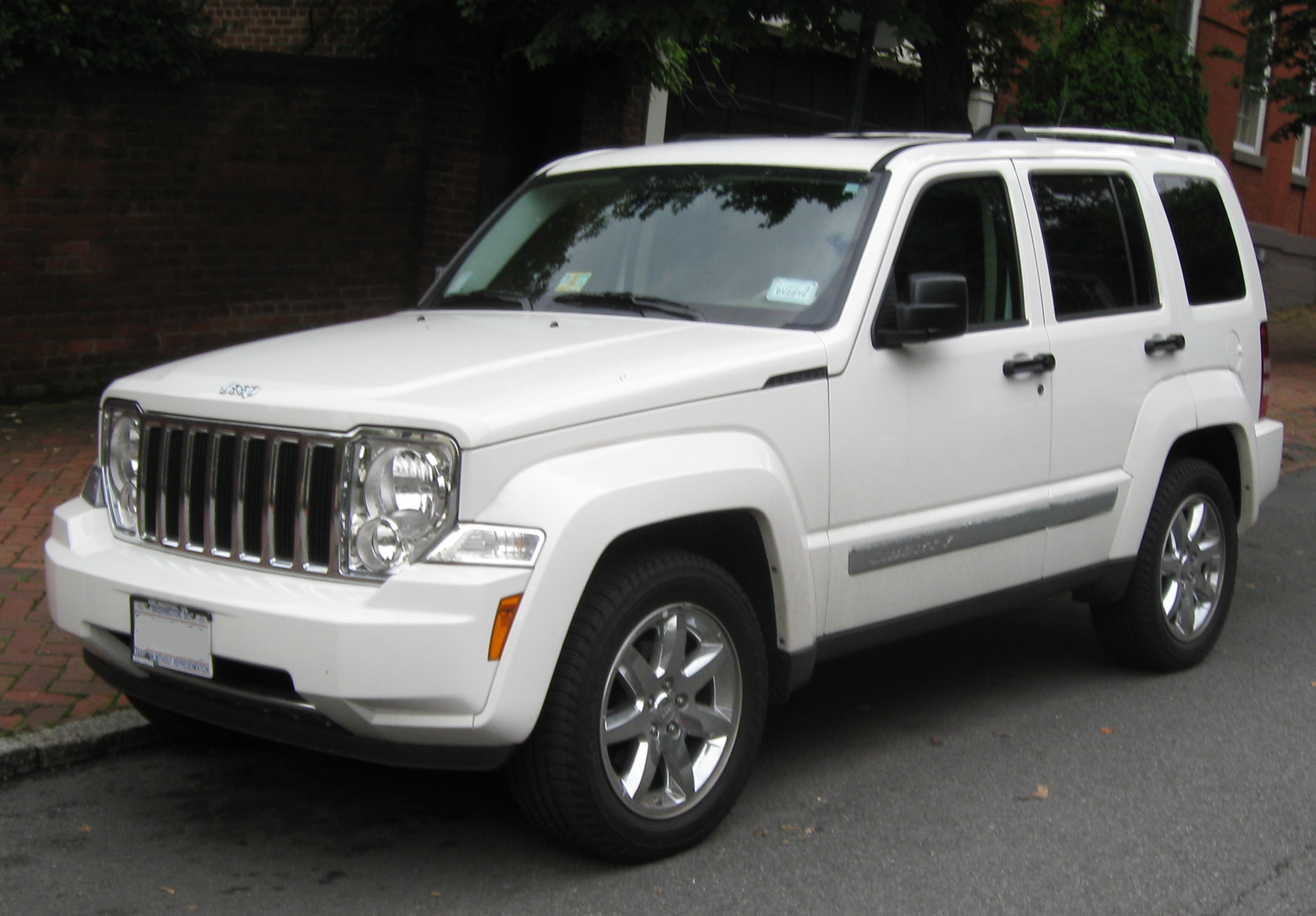
2008–2012 Jeep Liberty

The Jeep Liberty received a complete redesign for the 2008 model year and was marketed along with the closely related Dodge Nitro. The 2008 Liberty debuted at the 2007 New York International Auto Show.

With the smaller Patriot and Compass crossover SUVs now available to cater to economy-conscious buyers, the four-cylinder engine was dropped from the Liberty's offerings. The iron-block, aluminum-head V6 was the only engine available for 2008. Towing capacity was 5,000 pounds (2,268 kg). Jeep discontinued the Liberty CRD for the American market because it could not meet tougher 2007 emissions standards for diesel engines. Transmission choices were both carry-overs: a six-speed manual or a four-speed automatic. Standard equipment included electronic stability control with roll mitigation, traction control, and anti-lock brakes with brake assist. Jeep offered a rare 2WD version on the "Jet" model. New Features included standard side airbags. Optional features are rain-sensing wipers, Sirius Satellite Radio, Bluetooth, a navigation system, and the MyGig entertainment system complete with a 30GB hard drive.

== Total U.S. sales ==
Calendar Year	Sales
2001	69,420
2002	171,212
2003	162,987
2004	167,376
2005	161,883
2006	133,557
2007	92,105
2008	66,911
2009	43,503
2010	49,564
2011	66,684
2012	75,483
