= Jeep Liberty (KJ) =

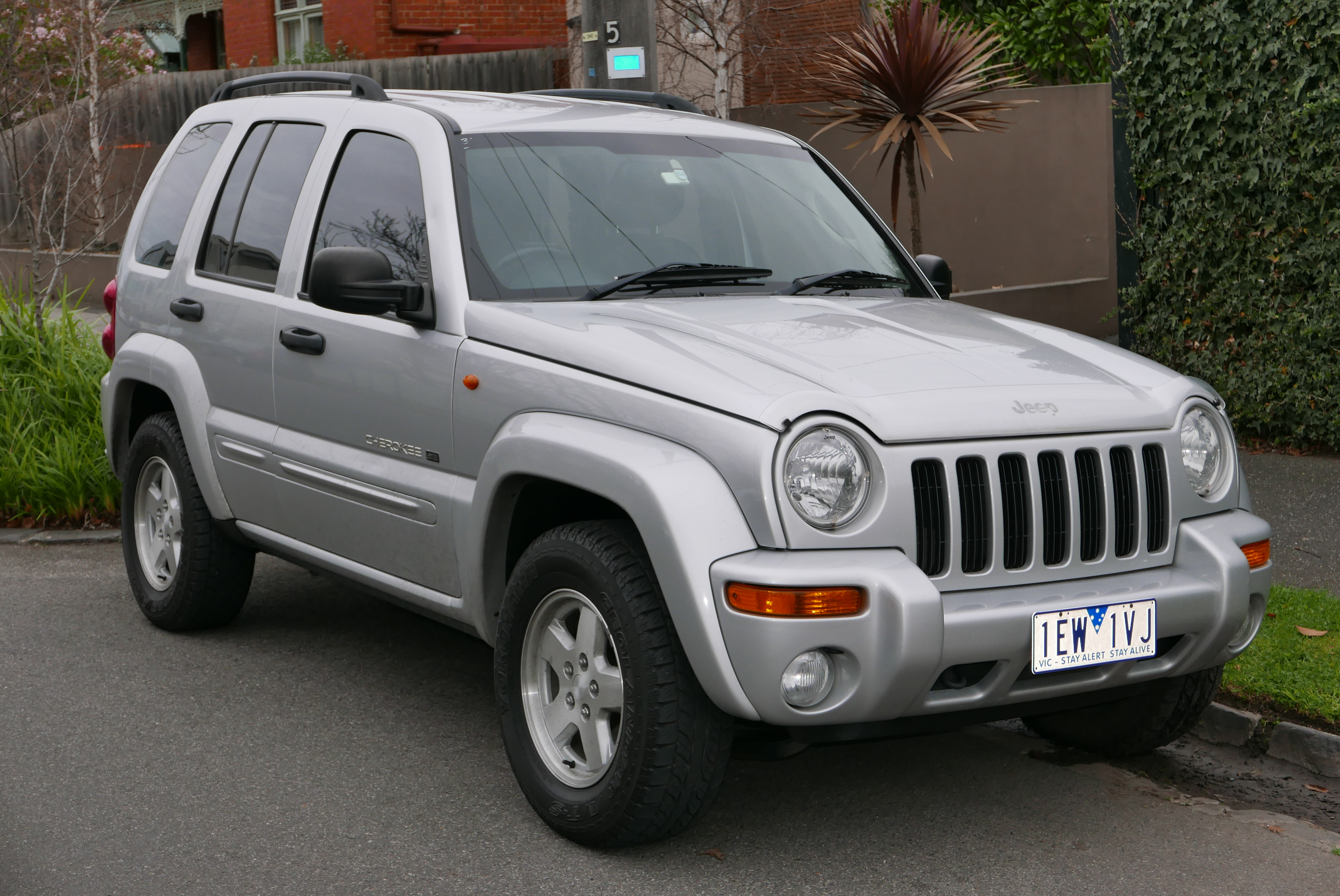

Overview
- Manufacturer: DaimlerChrysler (2002–2007)
- Also called: Jeep Cherokee (outside of North America)
- Production: April 2001–June 2007
- Model years: 2002–2007
- Designer: Bob Boniface (1998)

Body and chassis
- Layout: Front-engine, rear-wheel drive / four-wheel drive
- Related: Jeep Grand Cherokee; Jeep Wrangler

Powertrain
- Engine: 2.4 L PowerTech I4 (gasoline); 2.5 L VM Motori R 425 I4 (turbo diesel); 2.8 L VM Motori R 428 I4 (turbo diesel); 3.7 L PowerTech V6 (gasoline)
- Transmission: 4-speed Ultradrive 42RLE automatic; 4-speed Chrysler 45RFE automatic; 5-speed Chrysler 545RFE automatic; 5-speed New Venture Gear NV1500 manual; 5-speed New Venture Gear NV3550 manual; 6-speed Chrysler NSG370 manual

Dimensions
- Wheelbase: 104.3 in (2,649 mm)
- Length: 2001–2004: 174.2 in (4,425 mm); 2005–2007: 174.7 in (4,437 mm)
- Width: 2001–2004: 71.1 in (1,806 mm); 2005–2007: 71.8 in (1,824 mm)
- Height: 2001–2004: 73.2 in (1,859 mm); 2005–2007: 69.8 in (1,773 mm)
- Curb weight: 3,508–4,312 lb (1,591–1,956 kg)

Chronology
- Predecessor: Jeep Cherokee (XJ)
- Successor: Jeep Liberty (KK)

The Jeep Liberty (KJ), or Jeep Cherokee (KJ) outside North America, is a compact SUV that was produced by Jeep from 2002 to 2007. Introduced in May 2001 as a replacement for the Cherokee (XJ), the unibody Liberty was priced between the Wrangler and Grand Cherokee. It was the smallest of the 4-door Jeep SUVs up until the car platform-based 4-door Compass and Patriot arrived for 2007.

== Description ==
Inspired by styling from the Dakar and Jeepster concept vehicles, the Liberty was designed by Bob Boniface in 1998. Intended as a replacement for the discontinued Jeep Cherokee (XJ), the Liberty was the first Jeep vehicle to use rack and pinion steering and the two then-new PowerTech engines: the 150 horsepower (110 kW) 2.4 L straight-4, which was discontinued in 2006, and the 210 horsepower (160 kW) 3.7 L V6. However, the Liberty was not the first Jeep vehicle to use an independent front suspension, as the Jeep Wagoneer first used it in the 1963 model. But that independent front suspension was limited to four-wheel drive versions and, even then, was a short-lived option. The Liberty was nominated for the North American Truck of the Year award for 2002.

Three trim levels were initially offered: the top-end Limited, a more rugged-looking Renegade and the base Sport. All were made available with either 2WD or 4WD. In July 2004, for the 2005 model year, the Liberty received a mid-cycle facelift. The 2005, 2006 Renegade and 2005 Rocky Mountain Edition Liberties received an exclusive flat hood and taller grille. In 2007, the Renegade trim level was replaced with the Latitude which appeared to focus more on an urban appearance and lost the Renegade trim's unique hood and grille.

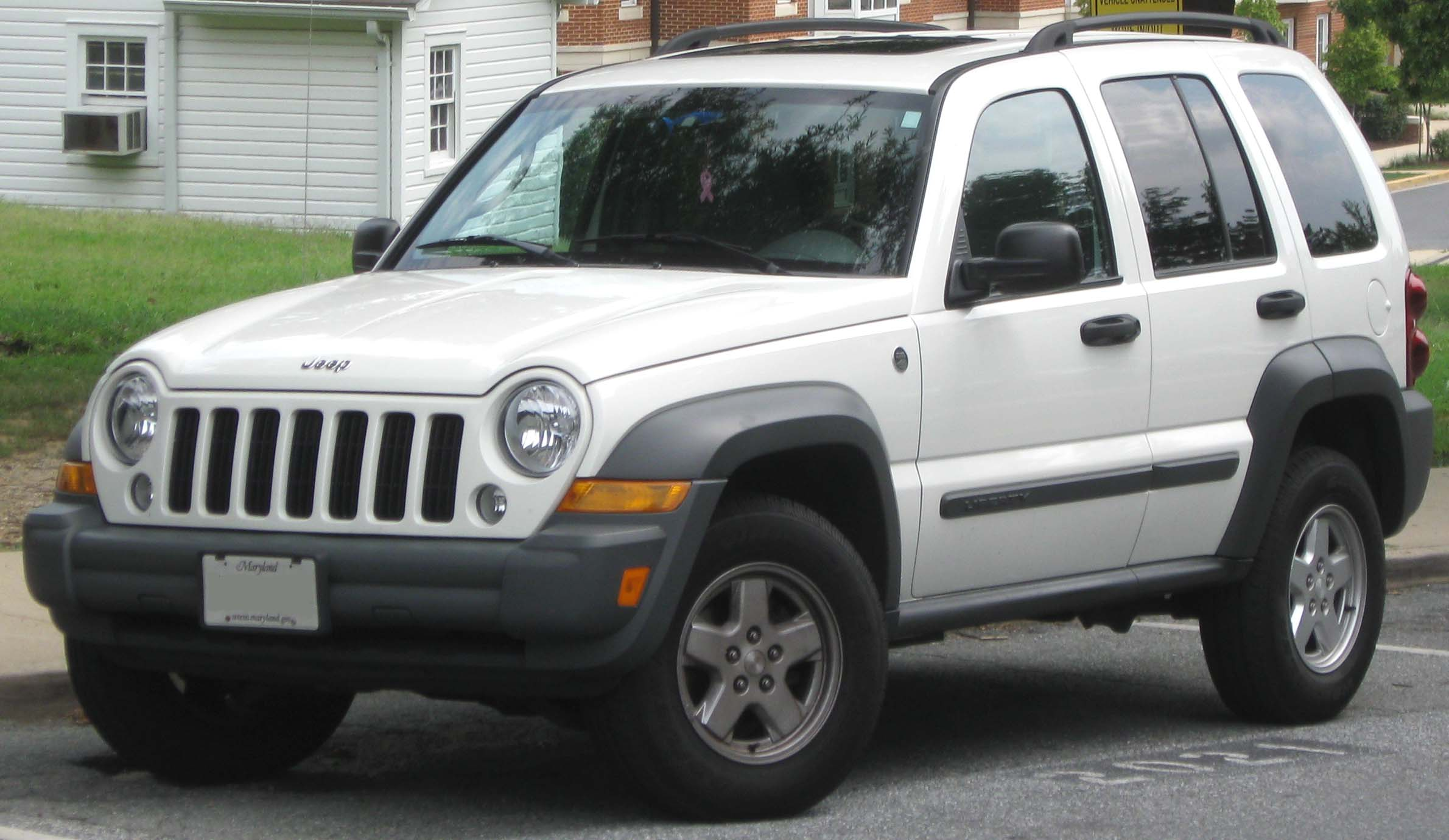
2005–2007 Liberty

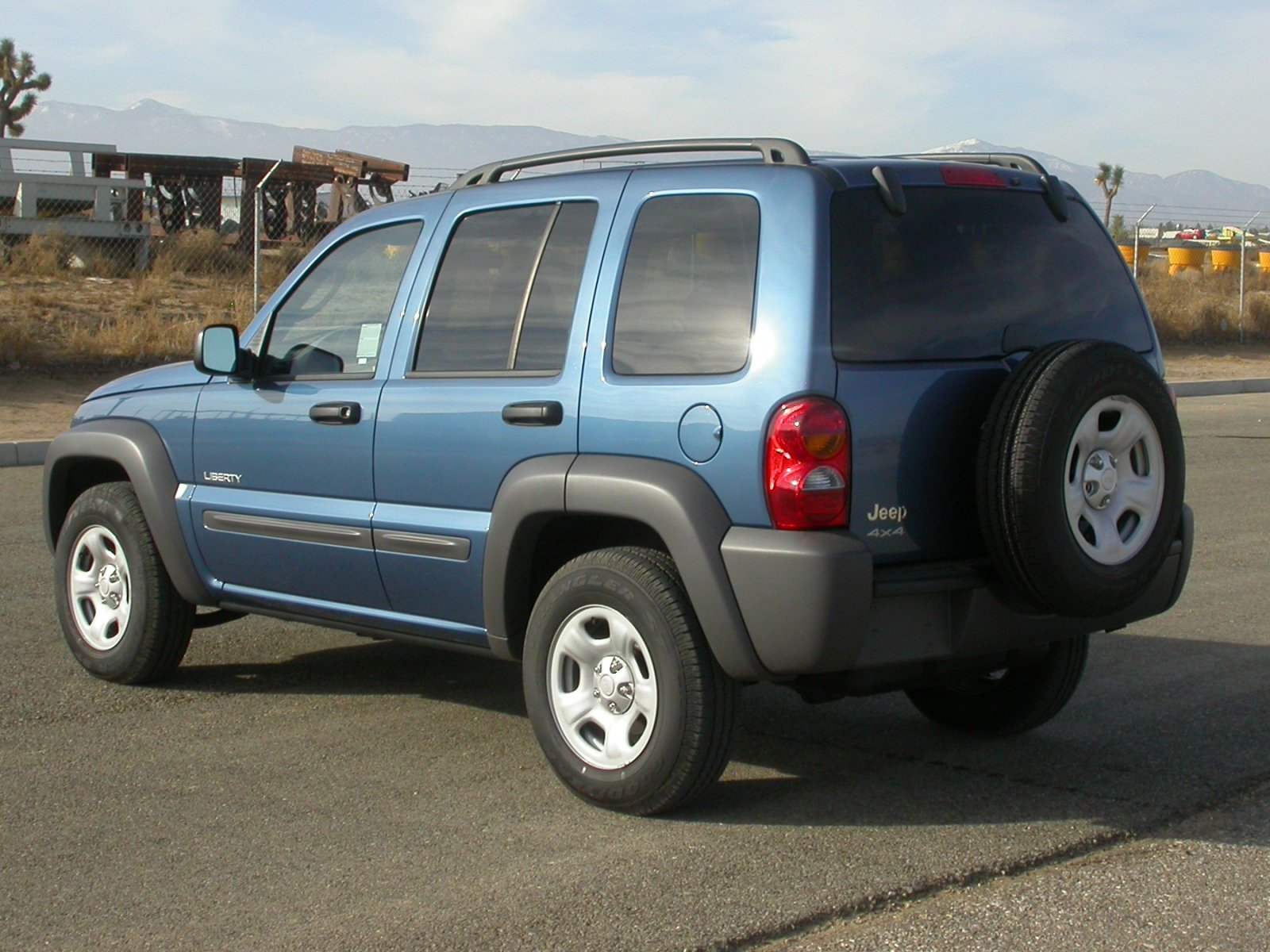
2004 Liberty (USA)

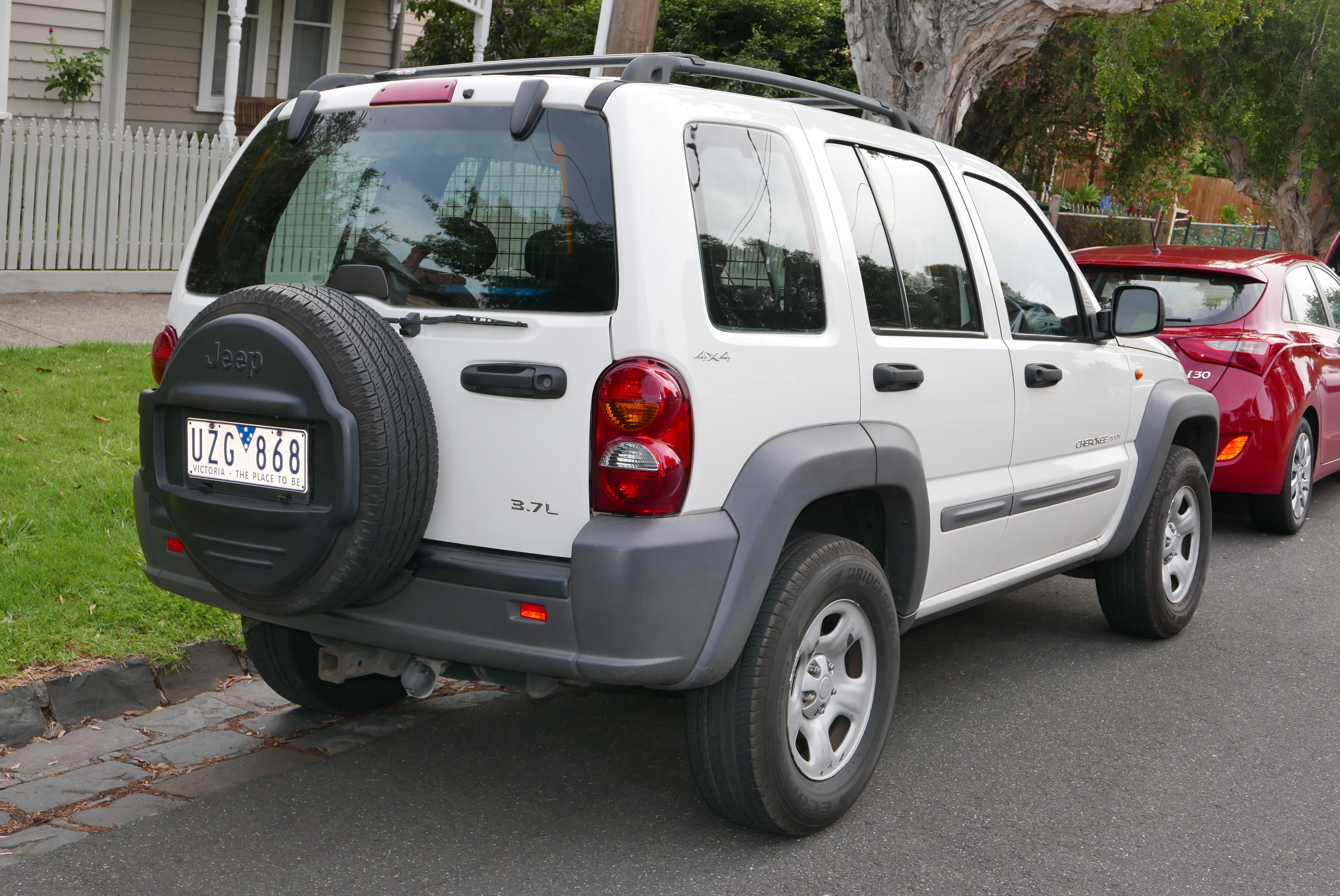
Cherokee Sport wagon (Australia)

=== Trim Levels and Equipment ===
The Liberty KJ was offered in three basic trim levels, each offering its own level of standard and optional equipment:

Sport: The Sport served as the "base" model. It offered the following standard equipment: a 2.4L "Power-Tech" Inline Four-Cylinder (I4) engine, a five-speed manual transmission, sixteen-inch (16") steel wheels, an AM/FM stereo with cassette player (later, a single-disc CD player), a six-speaker audio system, cloth seating surfaces, dual manually-adjustable front bucket seats, a split-folding rear bench seat, full instrumentation, manual windows and door locks (power windows and door locks became standard equipment starting in 2005), gray front and rear bumpers and body side cladding panels, and a rear-mounted spare tire and wheel.

- Optional equipment:
  - Included an AM/FM stereo with single-disc CD player (this later became standard equipment), power windows and door locks with keyless entry and automatic front windows, (also later became standard equipment), an Infinity premium amplified audio system, aluminum-alloy wheels, a full-size spare tire and wheel (this later became standard equipment), air conditioning (also later became standard equipment), a four-speed automatic transmission, a 3.7L "Power-Tech" V6 engine, a 2.8L Common-Rail Diesel (CRD) engine, a five-speed automatic transmission, and front-mounted fog lamps. "Special-Edition" models of the Liberty KJ, such as the 2003 Freedom Edition, the 2004 Columbia Edition, the 2005 and 2007 Rocky Mountain Edition, and the 2006 65th Anniversary Edition, were all based on the base Sport trim level.

Renegade: The Renegade served as the "off-road-ready" model of the Jeep Liberty between midyear 2002 and 2007. Based on the base Sport' model, it added the following equipment: a 3.7L "Power-Tech" V6 engine, power windows and door locks with keyless entry, cloth-and-vinyl-trimmed seating surfaces, air conditioning, sixteen-inch (16") color-keyed aluminum-alloy wheels (in Cactus Green, Mineral Gray, or Light Khaki), gray front and rear decorative wheel flares, Anti-Lock Braking System (ABS), front-mounted fog lamps, and an AM/FM stereo with single-disc CD player.

- Optional equipment:
  - Included seventeen-inch (17") chrome-clad aluminum-alloy wheels, roof-mounted "Off-Road" lamps, an Infinity premium audio system, leather-trimmed seating surfaces, low-back front bucket seats, a power tilt-and-sliding sunroof, and a four-speed automatic transmission.

Limited Edition: The Limited Edition was the top-of-the-line model. It added the following equipment to the Renegade trim level: a 3.7L "Power-Tech" V6 engine, a four-speed automatic transmission, sixteen-inch (16") aluminum-alloy wheels (later seventeen-inch (17")), color-keyed front and rear bumpers, chrome body side cladding panels, an AM/FM stereo with single-disc CD player, security system, power-adjustable front driver's bucket seat, air conditioning, front-mounted fog lamps, an overhead Electronic Vehicle Information Center (EVIC), and premium cloth seating surfaces with low-back front bucket seats.

- Optional equipment:
  - Included an AM/FM stereo with Radio Data System (RDS) and cassette and single-disc CD players (later, a six-disc, in-dash CD changer), an Infinity premium amplified audio system, luxury leather-trimmed seating surfaces, dual heated front bucket seats, a power-adjustable front passenger's bucket seat, seventeen-inch (17") chrome-clad aluminum-alloy wheels, Anti-Lock Braking System (ABS), a 2.8L Common-Rail Diesel (CRD) engine, a five-speed automatic transmission, and a power tilt-and-sliding sunroof.

=== CRD in North America ===
In 2005, DaimlerChrysler began offering a diesel engine to the North American market to gauge the marketability of diesel engines in North America. The last North American market Jeep product that was offered with a diesel engine was the 1987 Jeep Cherokee and Comanche. Only available for the 2005 and 2006 model years in Sport and Limited trims and only with an automatic transmission, the 2.8L VM Motori R 428 I4 common rail turbodiesel or CRD exceeded expectations by selling 10,000 vehicles in its first calendar year of production. The diesel utilized a variable geometry turbocharger and generated 160 horsepower (120 kW) and 295 lb⋅ft (400 N⋅m) of torque. The diesel offered 60 more foot-lbs of torque than the comparable V6 gasoline engine and offered higher fuel efficiency but it added nearly 200 pounds (91 kg) to the curb weight, a price increase, and offered less peak output power. The CRD was prohibited from being sold in Maine, Vermont, Massachusetts, New York, and California due to their higher emission standards and was discontinued for the 2007 model year due to stricter federal emission standards in the United States.

=== Four wheel drive systems ===
The Liberty is available with either a part-time Command-Trac or full-time Selec-Trac transfer case.

The Command-Trac transfer case has four positions: 2-HI, 4-HI, Neutral, and 4-LO. The lever is placed in 2WD HI for regular driving. This allows the two rear tires to receive power. The second position, 4WD HI, is used for driving on slippery or loose surfaces. This position locks both the front and rear drive shafts together, allowing the vehicle to maintain drive as long as at least one axle has traction. The third position, Neutral, disengages both drive shafts from the transfer case, allowing the car to roll freely; this is used for towing behind another vehicle, for example. The last position, 4WD LO, is used for situations requiring higher torque or slow speed when traversing rough terrain. A common misconception is that 4WD LO provides more traction. It only changes the gear ratio and does not add any more friction between the tires and the driving surface. This position, like 4WD HI locks both the front and rear drive shafts together, and by using a lower gear ratio, allows for 2.72 times more torque (however, the speed is limited to around 25 MPH max). Turning while in 4WD HI or LO on dry pavement is hazardous to vehicle components, through driveline binding and wheel-hop.

The Selec-Trac transfer case has five positions: 2-HI, 4-HI Part-Time, 4-HI Full-Time, Neutral, and 4-LO. The transfer case is different from the Command-Trac transfer only in the extra 4WD HI Full-Time position. The 4WD HI Full-Time position adds the same traction benefits that the part-time 4WD setting offers, but features an open differential between the front and rear axles to allow the two axles to spin at independent speeds and eliminate drive line binding and wheel-hop. The down side of 4WD Hi Full-Time is that, due to the open differential between front and rear drive lines, at times the drive train will only deliver power to the front or the rear e.g. when the front of the vehicle has reached a high traction surface such as dry pavement and the rear is in sand, the rear tires will spin with 100% of engine power, the front receiving no traction. Under equal traction conditions (front-rear), this position gives the rear wheels 52% of the engine's power and the front wheels 48% of the engine's power. The division of power and open center differential allows the Selec-Trac transfer case to be operated at all times in an "All Wheel Drive" mode with no adverse effects.

== Government/Fleet use ==
Even though no special Jeep Liberty was introduced in 2002 for police use, police and rental agencies continue to purchase it for fleet use. Most are equipped with the 3.7L "Power-Tech" V6 Engine that produces 210 horsepower, mated to a 4-Speed Automatic Transmission; however, some fleet Liberties used a 2.4L I4 Engine that produced about 150 horsepower with a 4-Speed Automatic Transmission. In 2008, when the Jeep Liberty was fully redesigned, the I4 engine was dropped, and the V6 engine was the only engine choice, as was the 4-Speed Automatic Transmission. Most fleet and government Liberties also use either the Selec-Trac or Selec-Trac II 4WD Systems, but some Liberties used 2WD.

Since it was introduced in April 2001 as a 2002 Model Year vehicle to the time it was discontinued in 2007, the Liberty KJ also found its way into rental car fleets. Most rental Liberty KJ's were the V6-powered Sport models with automatic transmissions and 4WD.

=== International versions ===
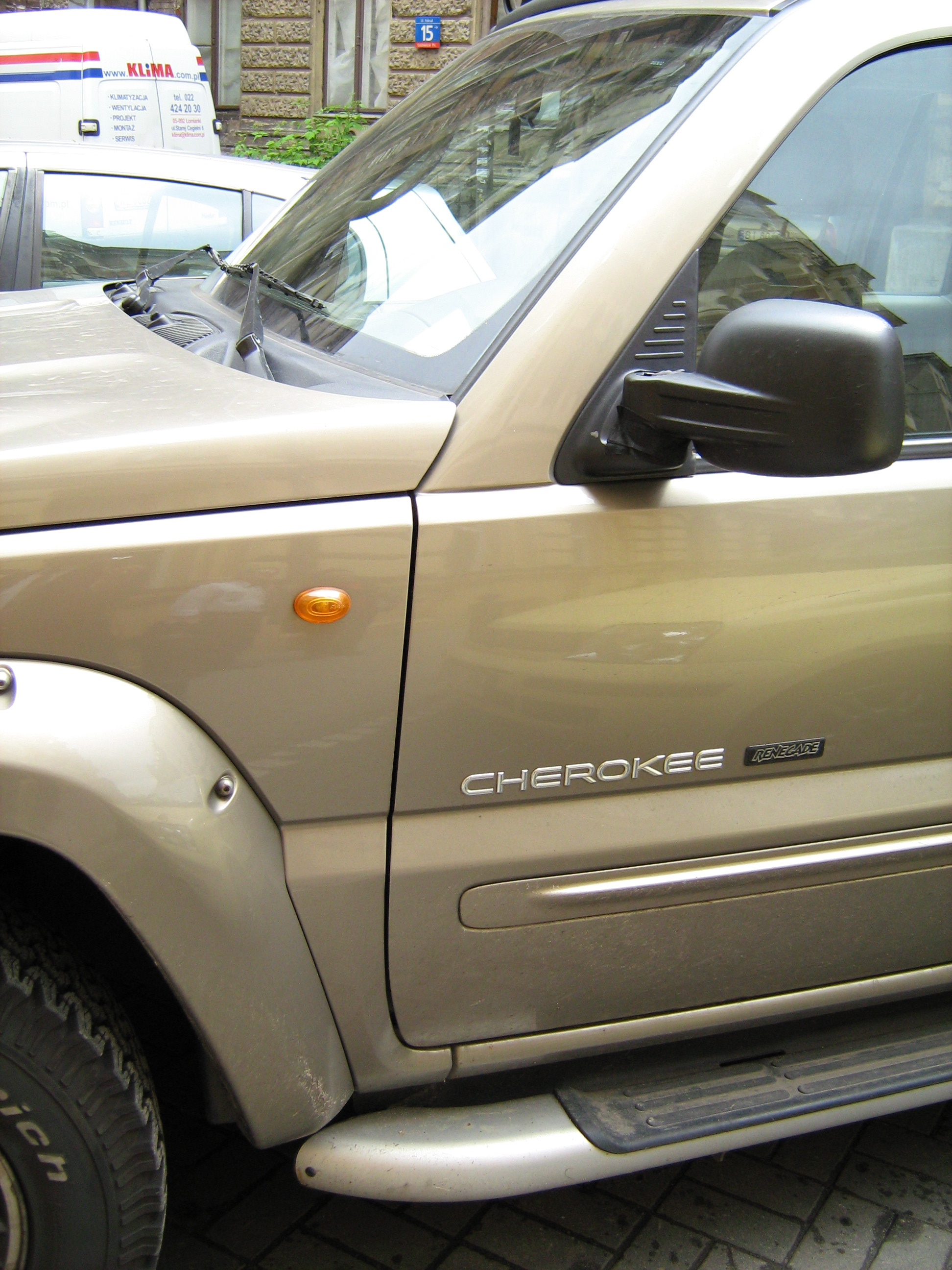
European badged Cherokee Renegade

Numerous versions were available in markets outside the U.S. and Canada.

Early-2002 through mid-2003 model year CRDs were equipped with a 2.5lt VM Motori Diesel producing 105 kW (143 PS; 141 hp) and 343 N⋅m (253 lb⋅ft). An external wastegated turbo was standard, and the engine was available only with a manual transmission.

A commercial Cherokee version with a 2.5 CRD engine and a five-speed transmission rated at 34.4 miles per imperial gallon (8.2 L/100 km; 28.6 mpg_{‑US}) has a completely flat cargo area (the rear seat area has a carpeted full-length galvanized metal floor) and the rear quarter glass and rear door glass are replaced with fixed body colored aluminum panels (the front doors have power windows). For additional cargo security, a removable floor-to-ceiling metal and mesh bulkhead is optional. In European markets, VAT-registered buyers can claim back the tax paid as this qualifies as a Commercial Vehicle.

- Arab American Vehicles Company (a joint venture) assembles the Jeep Cherokee (Liberty) for the Egyptian market.
- Carabobo Assembly Plant (DaimlerChrysler de Venezuela) assembles the Jeep Cherokee (Liberty) in Valencia, Carabobo for the Venezuelan market.

== Assembly ==
The Liberty was assembled at the Toledo North Assembly Plant in the United States, as well as in other countries, including Egypt and Venezuela.

== U.S. sales ==
Calendar Year	Sales
2001	88,485
2002	171,212
2003	162,987
2004	167,376
2005	166,883
2006	133,557

== See also ==
- Jeep Liberty
