= Jeep four-wheel-drive systems =

Overview of the various four-wheel drive systems Jeep uses on their vehicles

Jeep uses a variety of four-wheel drive systems on their vehicles. These range from basic part-time systems that require the driver to move a control lever to send power to four wheels, to permanent four-wheel systems that monitor and sense traction needs at all four wheels automatically under all conditions.

== Summary ==
Jeep four-wheel-drive system branding
Feature		Command-Trac	Rock-Trac	Selec-Trac	Quadra-Trac	Quadra-Trac II	Quadra-Drive	Quadra-Drive II	Freedom Drive	Active Drive	Selec-Terrain
Years		1980–present	2003–present	1983–present	1973–1998	1999–2004		2005–2021	2007–2017	2014–present	2011–present
Full/Part-time 4WD		Part	Part	Part/Full	Part/Full	Full/Adaptive		Full/Adaptive	Full	Full	Full
Modes		2Hi, 4HI PT, 4LO PT	2Hi, 4HI PT, 4LO PT	2WD, 4WD HI PT, 4WD HI FT, N, 4WD LO; ST II: 2WD, 4WD Auto, N, 4WD LO	4WD HI Locked (PT), 4WD HI Open (FT), N, 4WD LO Open (FT), 4WD LO Locked (PT)	QTII: 4-All Time, N, 4-Lo; QTI: 4-All Time	4-All Time, N, 4-Lo	4-All Time, N, 4-Lo	—	ADII: 4-Low; ADL: 4-Low, Rock	Auto, Snow, Sport, Sand/Mud, Rock
Transfer case		NP208 (1980–87); NP231/207 (1984–2001); NP241J (2002–07)	NV241OR (2003–present)	NP228/229 (1983–91); NP242 (1987–2007); MP3022 (Selec-Trac II, 2008–12 & 2018–present)	BW1339 (1973–79); NP219 (1980–82); NP/NV249 (1993–98)	NV247 (1999–2004)		NV245 (2005–10; WK) MP3023 (2011-2021; WK2)	(electronic)	—	—
Differential	F		Tru-Lok				Vari-Lok	Electronic LSD (WK) /No LSD - Traction Control Only (WK2/WL)		Open	
Differential	C	— (Note: Part-time system; transfer case locks front and rear axles together when engaged)	—	Open or locked	Limited-slip / locking	Limited-slip / locking		Electronic clutch pack		Electronic	
Differential	R	Trac-loc LSD (Note: Optional)	Tru-Lok (Note: Rear Tru-Lok functions as a limited-slip differential when not locked)	Trac-loc LSD			Vari-Lok	Electronic LSD		Open	
Low Range		2.72:1	4:1	2.72:1	2.57:1	QTII: 2.72:1	2.72:1		—	—	—

== Command-Trac ==
=== Command-Trac ===
Command-Trac was first introduced using the NP208 transfer case in the full-size Jeeps (SJ series) in 1980. The drive modes are the same as with the Dana 18 and 20 transfer cases: 2Hi, 4HI PT, and 4LO PT. The 4WD modes are not for use on high-traction surfaces such as dry roads. The NP208 was used through at least 1987.

More commonly, Command-Trac is used to refer to the NP/NV-231 or NP-207 transfer cases introduced along with the Jeep Cherokee (XJ) in 1984. The system offers a chain-driven, aluminum, "shift-on-the-fly" transfer case. The "shift-on-the-fly" feature provides manual ease and assist while engaging 4WD. Command-Trac should only be driven in 4WD on low-traction surfaces due to the front and rear axles being locked together (no differential action in the transfer case). Driving in 4WD on dry pavement causes excessive tire and drivetrain wear. Four-wheel modes are most commonly used for wet/slick surfaces or extreme weather conditions (rain, snow, etc.) (4H), towing (N), and off-road activities (4L).

There are reports of a modified version known as NP-231J HD which was supposedly (SP) a "heavy duty" version for the Jeep Grand Cherokee (ZJ) with V8 engines. The NP/NV-231 case is a chain-driven unit that takes 21- or 23-spline input shafts. The 23-spline was for the AX-15 transmission, and the 21-spline was used for the AX-5 and BA 10/5 transmissions. Low range for this case was 2.72 and high range was 1.00.

The Command-Trac HD transfer case was used in 6-speed Liberty KJ's from 2005 to 2007. Although sometimes referred to as the "NV(NP)231HD," the transfer cases are actually the 241 series used in full-sized trucks from other makers (241D or 241C). The Jeep version is labelled "NV(NP)241J." This is not the NV241OR transfer case found in the Jeep Wrangler Rubicon, which uses a 4.0 low range and has a reinforced case. Dodge uses a 241DHD, which has a reinforced case but the 2.72 low range.

The Jeep Grand Cherokee/Commander line no longer offers a part-time transfer case option. The reason behind this was its poor sales along with an improved Selec-Trac. Selec-Trac and a simplistic Quadra-Trac had the convenience and comfort of "Full-Time" all wheel drive that Command-Trac lacked for "luxury" SUV's that did not require the more rugged part-time system.

The terms "Command-Trac" and "Selec-Trac" were used in other Jeep lines and refer to different transfer cases in those lines.

Applications:

- 1984-2001 Jeep Cherokee (XJ)
- 1986-1992 Jeep Comanche (MJ)
- 1987–Present Jeep Wrangler (YJ, TJ, JK, JL)
- 1993-1995 Jeep Grand Cherokee (ZJ)
- 2002-2007 Jeep Liberty/Cherokee (KJ)
- 1980-1987 Jeep Cherokee/Wagoneer/Grand Wagoneer (SJ)

=== Command-Trac II ===
Command-Trac II works the same as Command-Trac but uses a console mounted switch to control the MP1522 transfer case as opposed to a floor mounted lever.

Applications:

- 2008-2012 Jeep Liberty/Cherokee (KK)

== Rock-Trac ==
Rock-Trac is similar to Command-Trac but uses the New Venture Gear NV241OR and adds locking differentials and 4:1 low gear ratio. In 2007 an electric front sway bar disconnect was added and the locking differentials switched from air-actuation to electric actuation.

Applications:

- 2003–Present Jeep Wrangler Rubicon (TJ, JK, JL)
- 2005–Present Jeep Wrangler Unlimited Rubicon (TJ, JK, JL)
- 2020–Present Jeep Gladiator Rubicon (JT)

== Selec-Trac ==
=== Selec-Trac ===
Selec-Trac was first introduced in the full-size Jeeps (SJ) in 1983 using the New Process NP228 and NP229 transfer cases. These are very similar to the Quadra-Trac NP219 transfer case described in the next section below. The differences are 1) they added a 2WD mode for fuel savings and 2) the 2WD-to-4WD modes were controlled via a vacuum switch on the dashboard. The Hi-N-Lo range selection was still performed using a shift lever on the console. The NP228 differs from the NP229 by not having the viscous coupling in 4WD Hi mode, reverting to a simpler open center differential. Both transfer cases still lock the center differential in 4WD Lo mode. The NP228/229 transfer cases were available in the full-size Jeeps from 1983 to 1991. The NP228 was also available in the XJ Cherokee and Wagoneers and the MJ Comanche pickups from 1984 until replaced by the NP242 in 1987. Several companies have offered a dual shift lever conversion which replaces the vacuum switch and solenoid with a more reliable second console lever for 2WD-4WD mode selection.

The AMC Eagle used the NP119 transfer case in 1980, a strictly full-time all wheel drive model. From 1981 to 1988, a similar system was employed, dubbed "Select-Drive", which allowed the vehicle to switch from all wheel drive to 2WD using the NP129 model transfer case. The NP129 contained a viscous coupling around an open differential for added traction in slippery conditions. The NP128 has also been found equipped in select model years, which does not feature a viscous coupling.

The NP242 Selec-Trac transfer case debuted alongside the Fuel-Injected 4.0L Inline-6 in the compact Jeep Cherokee in 1987. The shifter has modes 2WD - 4WD Hi Part-Time - 4WD Hi Full-Time - N - 4WD Low. There is a center differential that is open in 4WD Hi Full-Time mode and distributes torque 48/52% front-to-rear. This mode can be used on dry pavement or slippery surfaces with only a small fuel mileage penalty compared to 2WD mode. In 4WD Hi Part-Time and 4WD Low, the center differential is mechanically locked, so these modes are for slippery surfaces only. Low range engages a 2.72:1 planetary gear ratio for increased torque and low speeds. Overall, this system functions very much like the NP228 transfer case above, just with all of the mode and range controls via a single, console-mounted shift lever. It was available in the 1987 to 2001 XJ Cherokee and Wagoneer, the 1987 to 1992 MJ Comanche, the 1993 to 2004 ZJ and WJ Grand Cherokees, the 2002 to 2007 KJ Liberty, and the 1998 to 2000 Dodge Durango. It was replaced in the 2005 Grand Cherokee by the Quadra-Trac II system featuring the NV245 transfer case with 4WD Auto mode and in the 2008 KK Liberty by Selec-Trac II using the MP3022 transfer case.

Applications:

- 1983–1991 Jeep Wagoneer/Grand Wagoneer and Jeep full-size pickups (SJ)
- 1984–2001 Jeep Cherokee/Wagoneer (XJ)
- 1986–1992 Jeep Comanche (MJ) *note, 1986 models were available with Selec-Trac utilizing only the NP228/NP229
- 1993–2004 Jeep Grand Cherokee (ZJ, WJ)
- 1998–2000 Dodge Durango
- 2002–2007 Jeep Liberty/Cherokee (KJ)

=== Selec-Trac II ===
Selec-Trac II uses a console mounted switch to control the MP3022 transfer case. The switch controls the 4WD mode with options of 2WD - 4WD Auto - N - 4WD Low. The MP3022 transfer case uses an electronically controlled clutch pack to bias torque from 100% rear to 50/50% front/rear. The transfer case has no center differential, so power can only be supplied to the front axle when the rear wheels begin to slip. In this way, the transfer case works almost identically to the NV247 transfer case used in the Quadra-Trac II system in 1999 to 2004 WJ Jeep Grand Cherokees. In 4WD Low mode, the clutch pack is locked and power flows through a 2.72:1 planetary gear set for higher torque at lower speeds.

The 2018 and newer JL Wrangler comes by default with Command-Trac, but its Sahara trim can be upgraded to Selec-Trac II, marketed as simply Selec-Trac, utilizing the MP3022 transfer case.

Applications:

- 2008–2012 Jeep Liberty/Cherokee (KK)
- 2018–Present Jeep Wrangler Sahara (JL)
- 2021–Present Jeep Gladiator (JT)

== Quadra-Trac ==
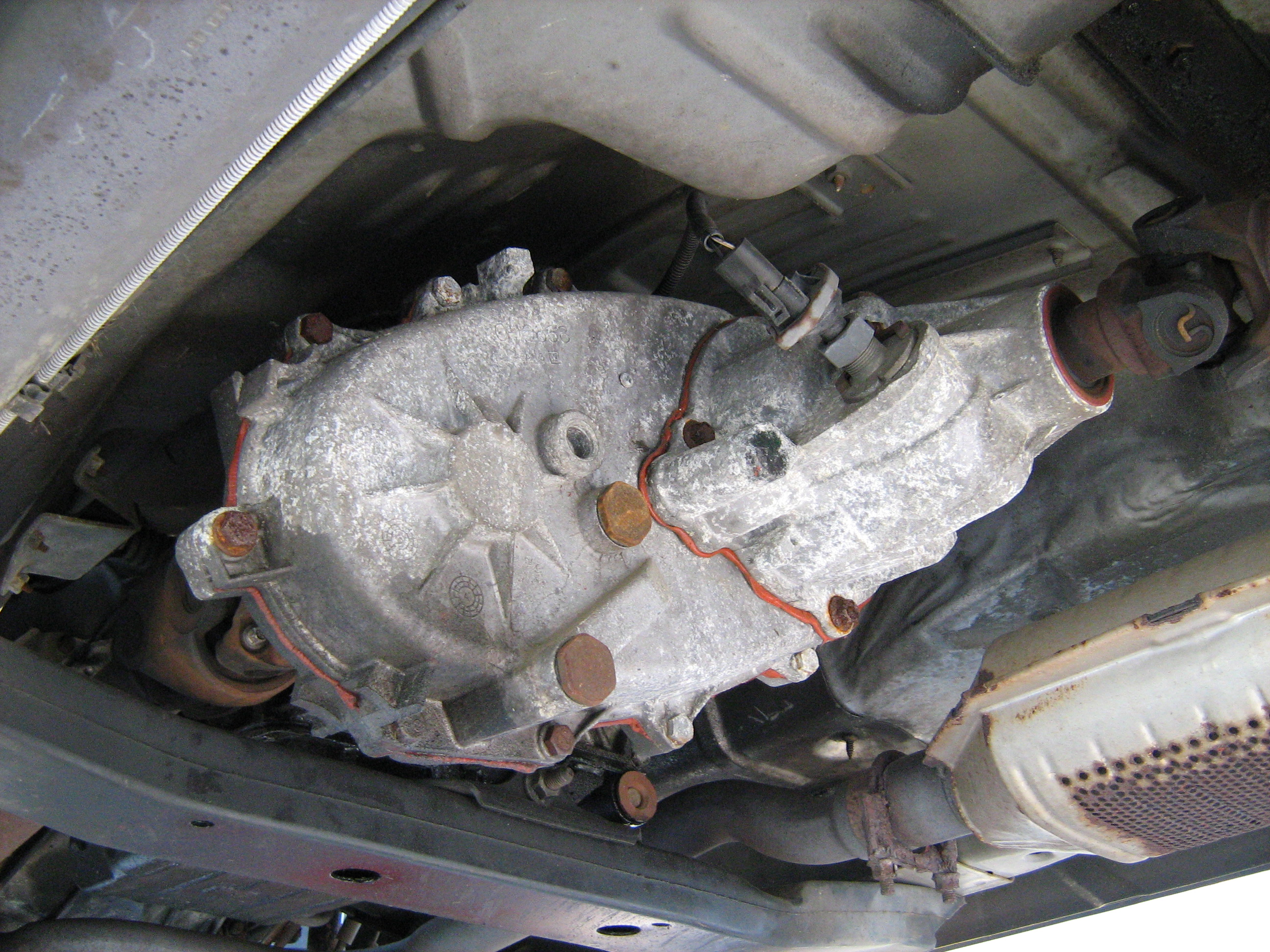
Quadra-Trac transfer case in a 1993 Jeep Grand Cherokee ZJ

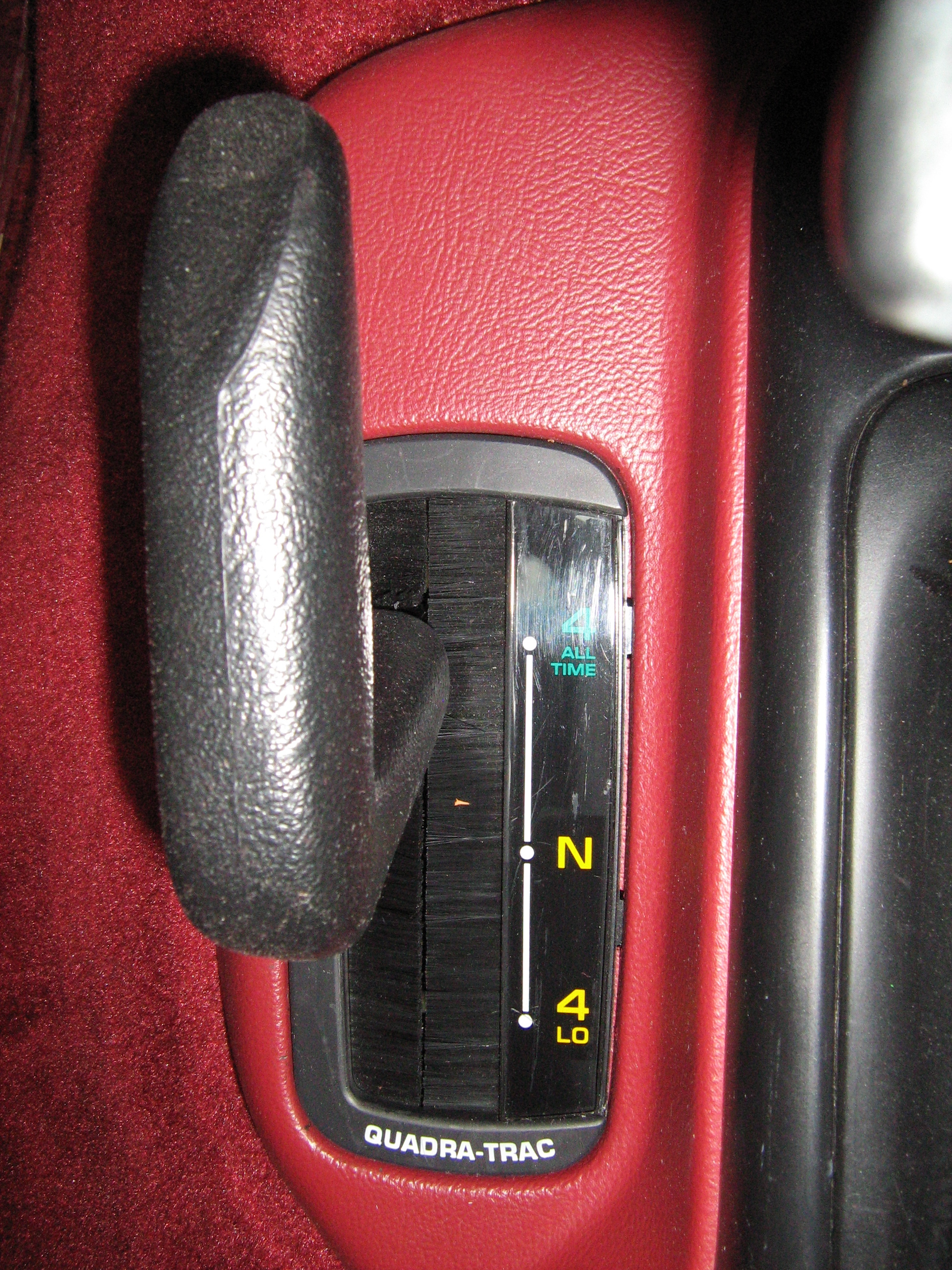
Quadra-Trac selector in a 1993 Jeep Grand Cherokee ZJ

The Quadra-Trac name is used on a variety of full-time 4WD systems. The first version used the Borg-Warner BW1339 transfer case and was produced from 1973 to 1979. The next version used the New Process NP219 transfer case and was produced from 1980 to 1982. From 1993 to 1995 the New Process NP249 transfer case carried the name. And from 1996 to 1998 the transfer case was manufactured by New Venture Gear with some minor improvements and it was renamed the NV249.

Quadra-Trac was the trade name for the Borg-Warner 1305 and 1339 gear cases. It was a chain-drive system introduced in 1973 on the full-sized Jeep line behind the AMC version of the Turbo-Hydramatic 400 automatic transmission. CJ7s also received the Quadra-Trac starting in 1976. The BW1305 included 1) a differential with a cone-type slip-limiting clutch to distribute torque between the front and rear output shafts and 2) a vacuum-switch-operated differential lock. It offered only 4WD Hi modes in full-time (open) or part-time (locked) modes. The BW1339 added a 2.57:1 low range gearset to the BW1305, enabling 5 modes: 4WD Hi Locked, 4WD Hi Open, Neutral, 4WD Low Open, and 4WD Low Locked.

The Jeep Quadra-Trac was differentiated from the open "New Process" Gear NP203 used by Dodge, General Motors, and Ford in that it included a center limited slip differential feature, in this case a clutch pack.

Applications:

- 1973-1979 Jeep Wagoneer (SJ)
- 1973-1979 Jeep Cherokee (SJ)
- 1973-1979 Jeep Gladiator
- 1976-1979 Jeep CJ-7

The Borg-Warner system was replaced with a "New Process Gear" NP219-based system in 1980 The NP219 Quadra-Trac transfer case was available in full-size Jeep Cherokee, Wagoneer, and Grand Wagoneer from 1980 through 1982. It offered the following modes: 4H LK, 4H, N, and 4L. In 4H (full-time 4WD High) a center differential with a viscous limited-slip coupling is used between the front and rear output shafts. A 2.61:1 low range was engaged in 4WD Lo mode. And in both '4H LK' (4WD Hi Locked) and '4L' modes the center differential is mechanically locked. The 'N' mode disengages the transfer case, transmission, and engine from the axles, thus enabling flat-towing the Jeep behind another vehicle. In 1983, the NP219-based Quadra-Trac system was replaced by the NP228/229-based Selec-Trac, adding a fuel-saving 2WD mode to the full- and part-time 4WD modes of Quadra-Trac.

Applications:

- 1980-1982 Jeep Wagoneer and full-size pickups (SJ)

In 1993 Jeep re-introduced Quadra-Trac, this time on the Jeep Grand Cherokee using the NP249 transfer case. Like the NP219, this transfer case utilizes a center differential with a viscous coupler to provide smooth and efficient four-wheel drive operation on all surfaces. This system has 4WD All-Time, Neutral, and 4WD Low modes. In normal 4WD All-time mode, the center differential is open and distributes torque to both the front and rear axles. When a difference in speed occurs between the axles, heat buildup causes the viscous fluid inside the coupler to thicken, which progressively locks the center differential thus transferring power to the axle with more traction. In 4WD Low, the input torque is multiplied through a 2.72:1 planetary gearset. NP249 transfer cases used the viscous coupler to transfer power in both high and low ranges.

Applications:

- 1993-1995 Jeep Grand Cherokee (ZJ)

In 1996 the NP249 was replaced with the New Venture Gear NV249 transfer case. This added a mechanical differential lock to 4WD Low mode, making it much more durable for serious off-road use. The NV249-based Quadra-Trac system was replaced by the NV247-based Quadra-Trac II system for the 1999 to 2004 Jeep Grand Cherokee (WJ).

Applications:

- 1996-1998 Jeep Grand Cherokee (ZJ)

== Quadra-Trac II ==
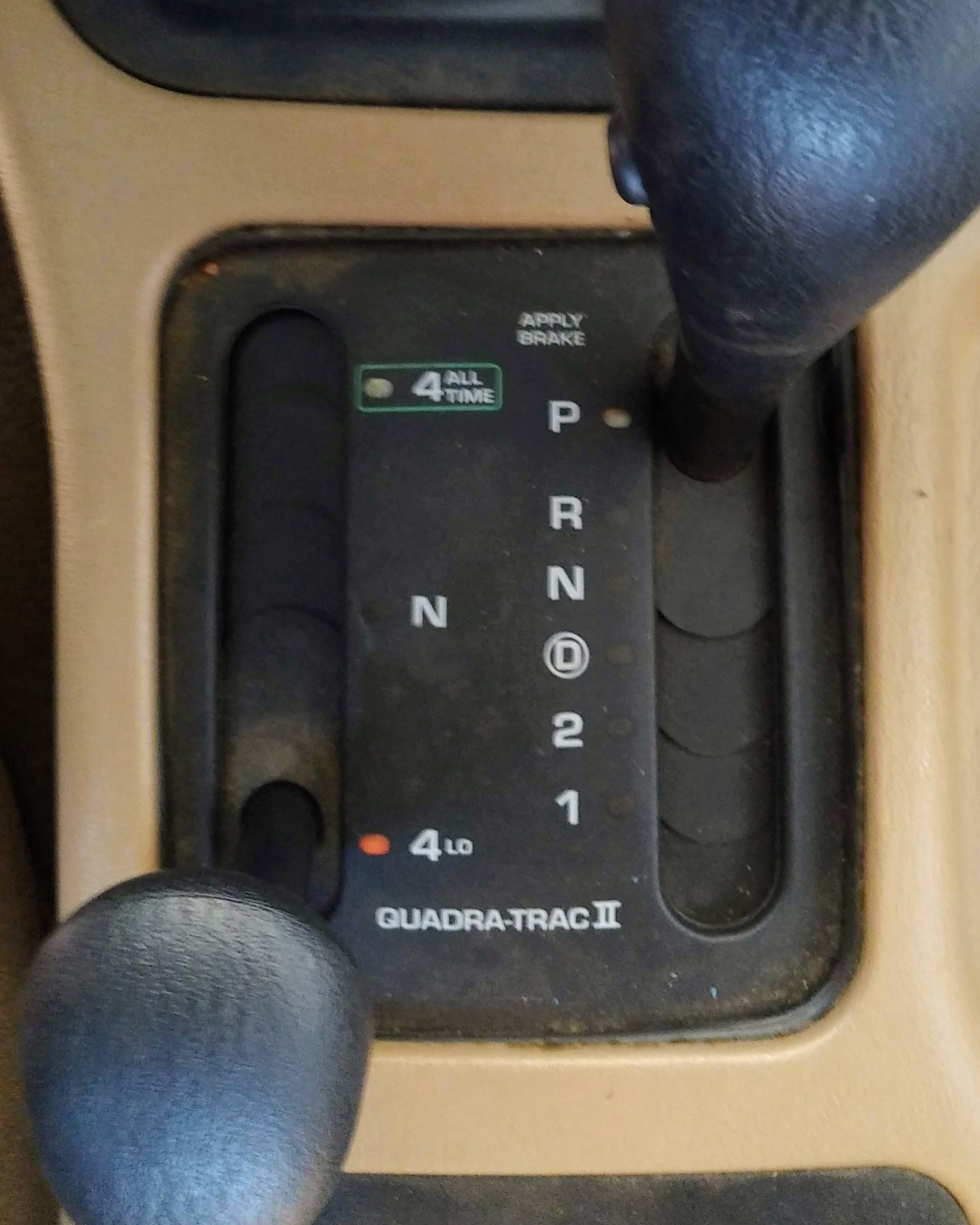
Quadra-Trac II selector in a 1999 Jeep Grand Cherokee (WG)

Quadra-Trac II was introduced in 1999 and it employs a two-speed chain-driven transfer case featuring three modes of operation, "4-All Time", "N" or neutral, and "4-Lo". Two different transfer cases were used, the NV247 in 1999-2004 WJs and the NV245 in 2005-2010 WKs and 2006-2009 XKs.

For the 1999-2004 Jeep Grand Cherokees using the NV247 transfer case, in "4-All Time" mode torque is applied to only the rear wheels under normal driving conditions. A gerotor pump is connected between the front and rear output shafts and senses any speed difference between them. When the shafts are turning at different speeds (wheel slippage), the pump supplies oil under pressure to a wet clutch pack. The clutch pack applies progressive 0 to 100% locking between the front and rear output shafts. For example, if the rear axle starts rotating at a significantly higher rate than the front axle, the gerotor pump causes the clutch pack to progressively lock, transferring torque to the front axle until both axles are driven at the same speed. The apply pressure in the clutch pack bleeds off slowly, which progressively unlocks the clutch pack and biases torque output towards "rear only" unless the rear wheels are still slipping. There is no center differential, so on dry pavement the front and rear output shafts cannot be locked without causing driveline binding. The "N" or neutral mode is intended for towing the vehicle. In "4-Lo" mode, the input shaft drives through a 2.72:1 reduction planetary gear set and the front and rear axles are locked together through the clutch pack. This same NV247 transfer case is the foundation for the Quadra-Drive system described below.

In 2005 Jeep replaced the New Venture Gear NV247 transfer case with the NV245 transfer case. This transfer case actually has a center differential, allowing both the front and rear axles to have power supplied to them without driveline binding, even on dry pavement. The torque distribution under normal driving conditions (no tire slippage) is 48% front and 52% rear. There is also an electronically controlled variable lockup clutch pack that can apply progressive 0 to 100% locking across the center differential. This is the improvement over the Selec-Trac NV242 transfer case, as that system has only fully unlocked and fully locked settings and requires manual shifting between them. And finally, the NV245 has the 'N' and '4WD Low' modes which act in the same manner as in the NV247 transfer case above.

The major difference between the NV245-based Quadra-Trac II and Quadra-Drive II is that Quadra-Trac II uses the Brake Traction Control System (BTCS) instead of electronically controlled differentials. When it senses a left-to-right speed differences between wheel hubs BTCS can apply each of the vehicle's brakes independently, similar to anti-lock brakes, enabling Quadra-Trac II's open front and rear differentials to offer limited-slip capabilities.

Applications:

- 1999–Present Jeep Grand Cherokee (WJ, WG, WK, WK2, WL)
- 2006-2009 Jeep Commander (XK)

=== Quadra-Trac I ===
Quadra-Trac I was introduced in 2004 and works similarly to the Quadra-Trac II system, but eliminates the "4 Lo" and "N" or neutral modes. By excluding these modes it creates a system that requires no driver input. In 2005 Jeep added the brake traction control system and replaced the New Venture Gear NV147 transfer case with the NV140 transfer case.

Applications:

- 2004–Present Jeep Grand Cherokee (WJ, WK, WK2, WL)
- 2006-2009 Jeep Commander (XK)

== Quadra-Drive ==
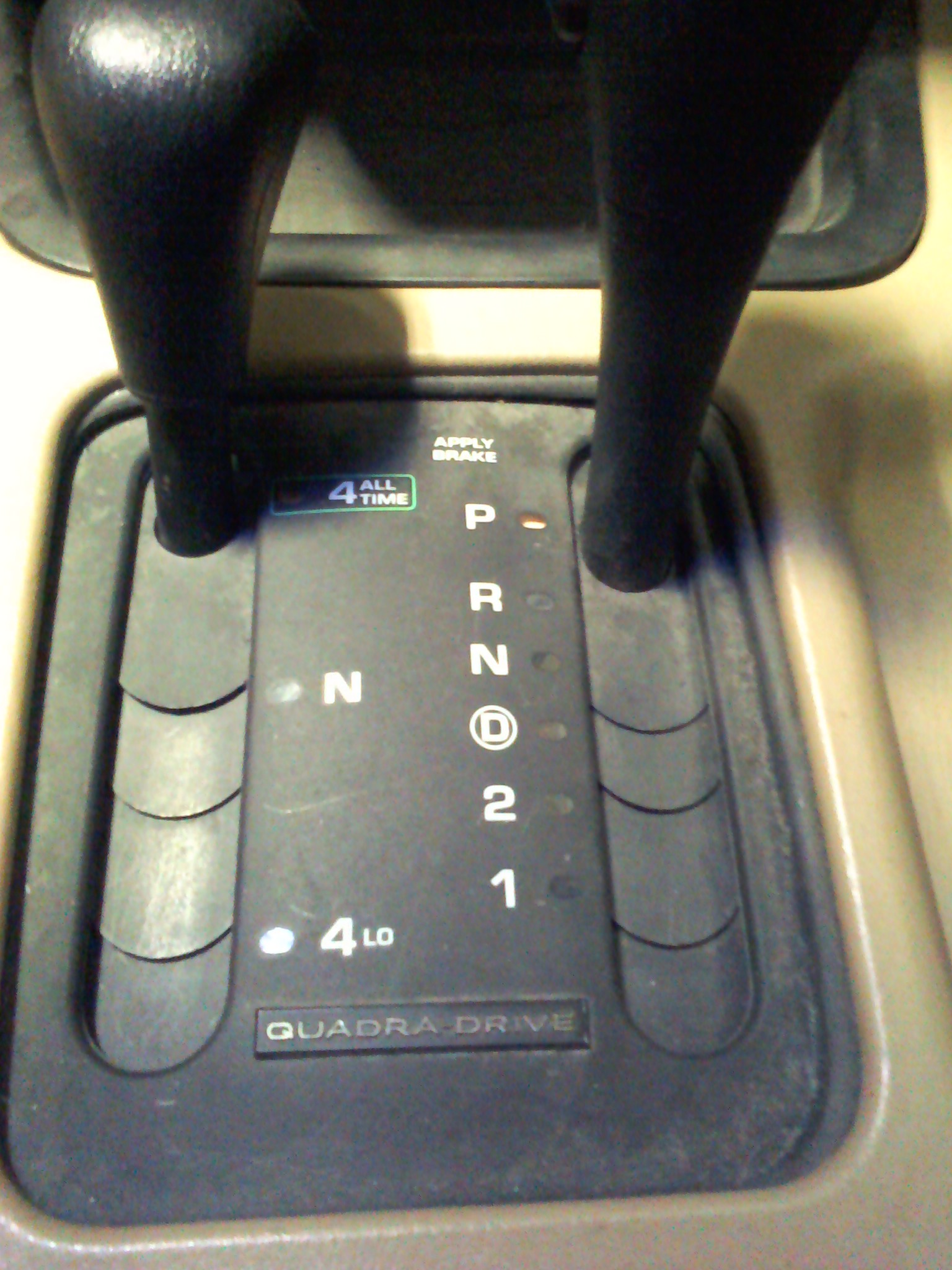
Quadra-Drive selector in a 1999 Jeep Grand Cherokee (WJ)

The Quadra-Drive system was introduced in 1999 and is based on the Quadra-Trac II system but adds gerotor differentials to the front and rear axles to create a four-wheel drive system capable of not only directing torque to the axle with the better traction but to the individual wheel on an axle with better traction.

=== Quadra-Drive ===
Quadra-Drive uses the New Venture Gear NV247 transfer case mated to front and rear axles containing Jeep's Vari-Lok which are gerotor-equipped differentials. Applications:

- 1999-2004 Jeep Grand Cherokee (WJ)

=== Quadra-Drive II ===
Quadra-Drive II uses the New Venture Gear NV245 transfer case mated to front and rear axles containing electronic limited-slip differentials or ELSDs. Jeep added traction control in 2005 and starting in 2011 only a rear ELSD is offered, while the front has an open differential.

Applications:

- 2005–Present Jeep Grand Cherokee (WK, WK2, WL)
- 2006-2010 Jeep Commander (XK)

== Freedom Drive ==
Freedom Drive is Jeep's four wheel drive system used in its compact crossover SUVs based on a front wheel drive platform, the Compass and Patriot. There are two versions of the basic Freedom Drive system for the US Market, called I and II.

=== Freedom Drive I ===
Freedom Drive I is a light duty full-time electronically controlled all wheel drive system with a locking mode to set the front/rear torque split for especially slippery conditions in the Jeeps derived from the Chrysler/Mitsubishi GS Platform.

Applications:

- 2007–2017 Jeep Compass (MK)
- 2007–2017 Jeep Patriot (MK)

=== Freedom Drive II ===
Freedom Drive II uses the same hardware as the FDI system but adds a lower axle gear ratio in conjunction with the CVT to simulate the benefits of a low-range transfer case, giving a 19:1 overall gear ratio for off-road use. This function is an alternate program in the CVT and is not a transfer case function. FDII also adds a hill descent control system, off-road tuned traction control, and electronic stability program. The Patriot with FDII also features longer suspension travel (all 4x4, post 2011 models have the same suspension), skid plates, tow hooks, and a full-size spare tire. This enables the FDII-equipped Patriot to wear the "Trail Rated" badge from Jeep. Trail Rated Jeep vehicles are determined by meeting several requirements of off-road conditions including water fording, articulation, and other tests.

Applications:

- 2007–2017 Jeep Patriot (MK)
- 2011–2017 Jeep Compass (MK)

For the European Market there is a single version which combines elements of both U.S. versions. The European version is available with either a CVT gearbox or most commonly with a 6-speed manual gearbox and has two settings on the traction control and electronic stability program systems to cater for off-road activity, U.S. FDII suspension travel and a full-size spare tire. Skid plates and tow hooks are options in the EU, but the hill descent control system is not available.

Applications:

- 2007–2017 Jeep Compass (MK)
- 2007–2017 Jeep Patriot (MK)

== Active Drive ==
=== Active Drive I ===
Active Drive I is a full-time four-wheel drive system that requires no driver input. This system under normal conditions sends all available torque to the front wheels while monitoring the speed of the front and rear axles. If the system detects that the front axle is moving more quickly than the rear axle then the system will send power through the power transfer unit to the rear axle until the speeds are the same.

Applications:

- 2014–2023 Jeep Cherokee (KL)
- 2015–present Jeep Renegade (BU)
- 2016–present Jeep Compass (MP)
- 2018–present Jeep Grand Commander

=== Active Drive II ===
Active Drive II includes all of the features of Active Drive I but adds a low gear range. When in "4-Low" mode the front and rear axles are locked together and power is sent to all four-wheels through a 2.92:1 gear reduction in the power transfer unit; providing a crawl ratio of 56:1 for four cylinder Jeep Cherokees and a 47.8:1 crawl ratio for six-cylinder Cherokees. All Cherokees with this system have a raised ride height of one inch.

Applications:

- 2014–2023 Jeep Cherokee (KL)

=== Active Drive Low ===
Active Drive Low includes all of the features of Active Drive I but denotes a greater possible crawl ratio. When in "4-Low" mode the front and rear axles are locked together and power is sent to all four-wheels through the power transfer unit although no low range gear reduction occurs. Active Drive low relies on shorter axle gear ratios while holding first gear in the ZF9HP transmission to achieve a crawl ratio of 20:1; similar in effect to Freedom Drive II.

Applications:

- 2015–present Jeep Renegade (BU)
- 2018–present Jeep Compass (MP)

=== Active Drive Lock ===
Active Drive Lock includes all the features of Active Drive II but adds "rock" mode to the Selec-terrain system and locking rear differential for better traction when used off-road. This four-wheel drive system combined with tow hooks, skid plates, and unique front and rear fascias allows the Jeep Cherokee Trailhawk models to obtain the "Trail Rated" badge from Jeep.

Applications:

- 2014–2023 Jeep Cherokee (KL)

== Selec-Terrain ==
Selec-Terrain is a system designed to calibrate the vehicle to provide the best on-road and off-road performance; depending on which terrain mode is selected. The modes are selected by a dial located near the center console and have five settings: "Auto", "Snow", "Sport", "Sand/Mud" and "Rock". This system was first offered in the 2011 Jeep Grand Cherokee. It also comes standard on all 2014 Jeep Cherokees with four-wheel drive and all Jeep Grand Cherokees with a two-speed transfer case.

Applications:

- 2011–2021 Jeep Grand Cherokee (WK2)
- 2014–2023 Jeep Cherokee (KL)
- 2014–present Jeep Renegade (BU)
- 2016–present Jeep Compass (MP)
- 2018–present Jeep Grand Commander
- 2024–present Jeep Wagoneer S
- 2026–present Jeep Cherokee (KM)
- 2026–present Jeep Recon

== See also ==
- AMC and Jeep transmissions
- Transfer case
- Jeep
