= Jeep Wrangler Unlimited =

Jeep Wrangler Unlimited may refer to:

- 4-door Jeep Wrangler (JKU) (produced 2007–2018)
- 2-door long-wheelbase Jeep Wrangler (TJ) (produced 2004–2006) or the Jeep Wrangler (TJ) Nighthawk
