= Jeep Wrangler (TJ) =

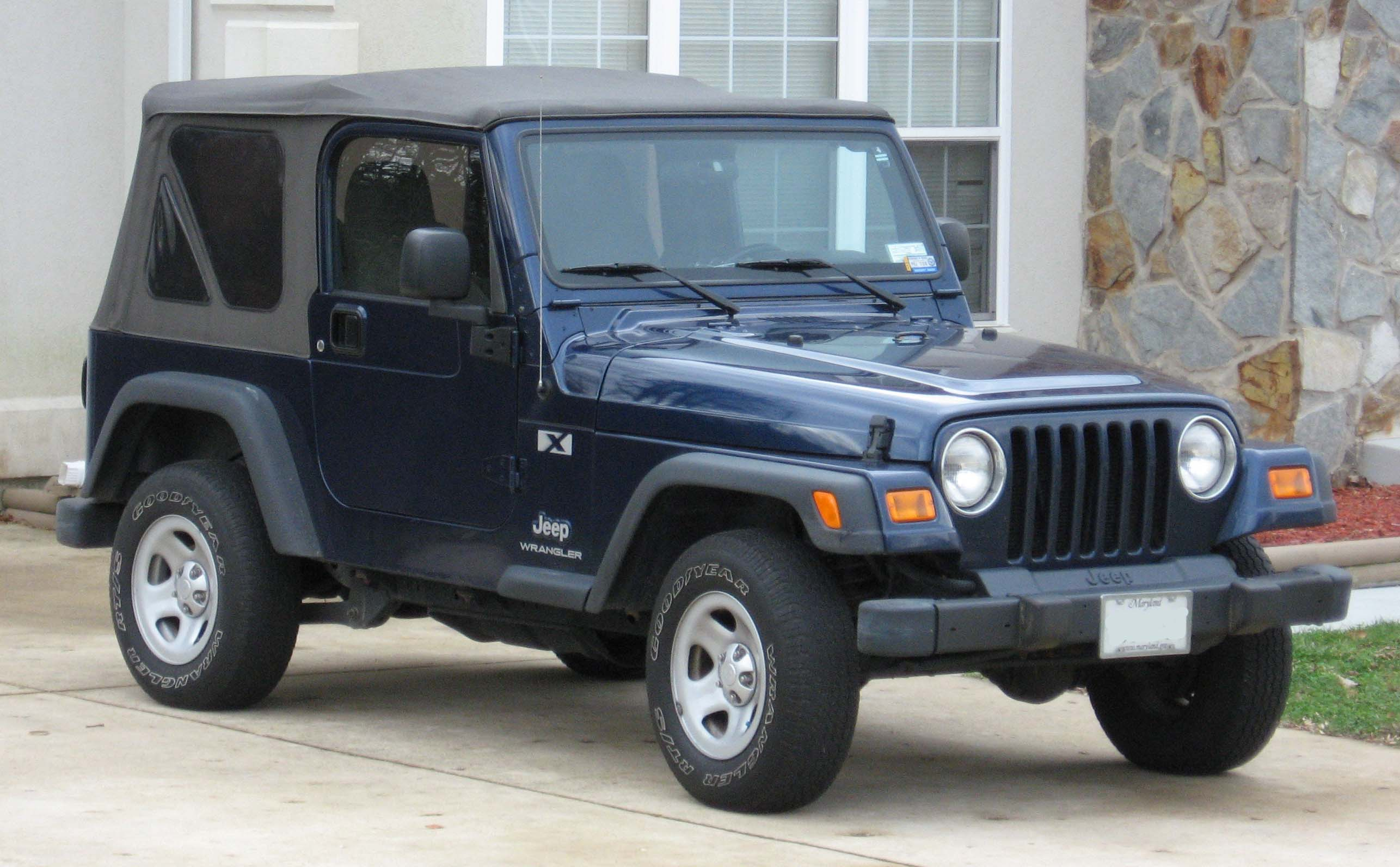

Overview
- Manufacturer: Jeep (Note: Chrysler Corporation (1996–1998) DaimlerChrysler (1998–2006))
- Also called: Jeep TJ (Canada); Jeep TJL (Egypt)
- Production: January 1996 – July 2006
- Model years: 1997–2006
- Assembly: United States: Toledo, Ohio (Toledo Complex); Egypt: Cairo (AAV)
- Designer: Michael Santoro (1992); Trevor Creed (MY 2003 refresh, LJ Unlimited: 2001)

Body and chassis
- Body style: 2-door convertible 2-door SUV
- Related: AIL Storm II; Jeep Liberty; Jeep Grand Cherokee

Powertrain
- Engine: 2.4 L PowerTech I4 Complete engine specs: •Displacement: 148.2 CID (2,429 cc); •Stroke: 3.94 in (100 mm); •Bore: 3.41 in (87 mm); •Power: n/a; •Torque: n/a; •Fuel Type: Gasoline; 2.5 L AMC I4 Complete engine specs: •Displacement: 150.4 CID (2,465 cc); •Stroke: 3.188 in (81 mm); •Bore: 3.875 in (98 mm); •Power: varied; •Torque: varied; •Fuel Type: Gasoline; 4.0 L AMC I6 Complete engine specs: •Displacement: 242.1 CID (3,968 cc); •Stroke: 3.413 in (87 mm); •Bore: 3.88 in (99 mm); •Power: 190 hp; •Torque: 235 ft-lbs.; •Fuel Type: Gasoline
- Transmission: 3-speed TorqueFlite 30RH automatic 3-speed TorqueFlite 32RH automatic 4-speed Ultradrive 42RLE automatic 5-speed Aisin AX-5 manual 5-speed Aisin AX-15 manual 5-speed New Venture Gear NV3550 manual 5-speed New Venture Gear NV1500 manual 6-speed Chrysler NSG370 manual Transfer cases: 1997-2006 New Process NP231; 2003-2006 New Process NP241OR

Dimensions
- Wheelbase: 93.4 in (2,370 mm) standard 103.4 in (2,630 mm) LWB
- Length: 1996–1999: 151.2 in (3,840 mm); 1999–2003: 155.4 in (3,947 mm); 2004–2006 SWB: 154.9 in (3,934 mm); 2004–2006 LWB "Unlimited": Without spare: 167 in (4,242 mm); Incl. spare: 171 in (4,343 mm)
- Width: 1996–2003, 2004–2006 LWB: 68.3 in (1,730 mm); 2004–2006 SWB: 66.7 in (1,690 mm)
- Height: 1996–1999: 70.2 in (1,780 mm); 1999–2001: 71.1 in (1,810 mm); 2002–2003 & 2004–2006 LWB: 70.9 in (1,800 mm); 2004–2006 SWB: 71.2 in (1,810 mm)
- Curb weight: 3,092–3,857 lb (1,403–1,750 kg)

Chronology
- Predecessor: Jeep Wrangler (YJ)
- Successor: Jeep Wrangler (JK)

The Jeep Wrangler (TJ) is the second generation of the Jeep Wrangler off-road and sport utility vehicle (SUV). Introduced in 1996 as a 1997 model, the TJ reintroduced the circular headlights that the classic Jeep models had been known for. For the 2004 model year, the long-wheelbase Unlimited model was introduced.

== History ==
In 1990, development of a successor to the YJ began in Chrysler's "Jeep-Truck Engineering Pre-Program" department under Bob Sheaves and TJ program director Craig Winn. Mules based on the YJ were built from 1990 to 1993, when formal approval was given for the TJ development program at a $260 million budget. From 1991 to 1992, designers worked at the new Chrysler Technical Center, building on various design proposals. In late 1992, Michael Santoro's TJ proposal was chosen by Tom Gale, Lee Iacocca, and executive management. In May 1993, now with engineering and supplier input, Santoro's final Wrangler production design was frozen at 32 months ahead of initial assembly. Verification prototypes using production bodies were built from early 1994 and tested through late 1995. As YJ production ceased in December 1995, the last pre-production TJ examples were assembled, with the start of the series of production in January 1996.

Unveiled on January 2, 1996, at the 1996 Detroit Auto Show as an early 1997 model year introduction (1996 model year skipped), the TJ was an evolutionary update. It later arrived in Jeep showrooms in April 1996, after 6 years of overall investment and 36-month production development phase.

Instead of leaf springs, this updated Wrangler featured a coil-spring suspension, front and rear, for better ride and handling, and a return to the classic CJ's round headlamps. The engine is the same 4.0 L AMC 242 Straight-6 used in the Cherokee and Grand Cherokee. A 2.5 L AMC 150 Inline-4 engine was available on entry-level models until 2002. The 2.4 L DOHC 4-cylinder engine previously used on the Chrysler PT Cruiser replaced it for 2003.

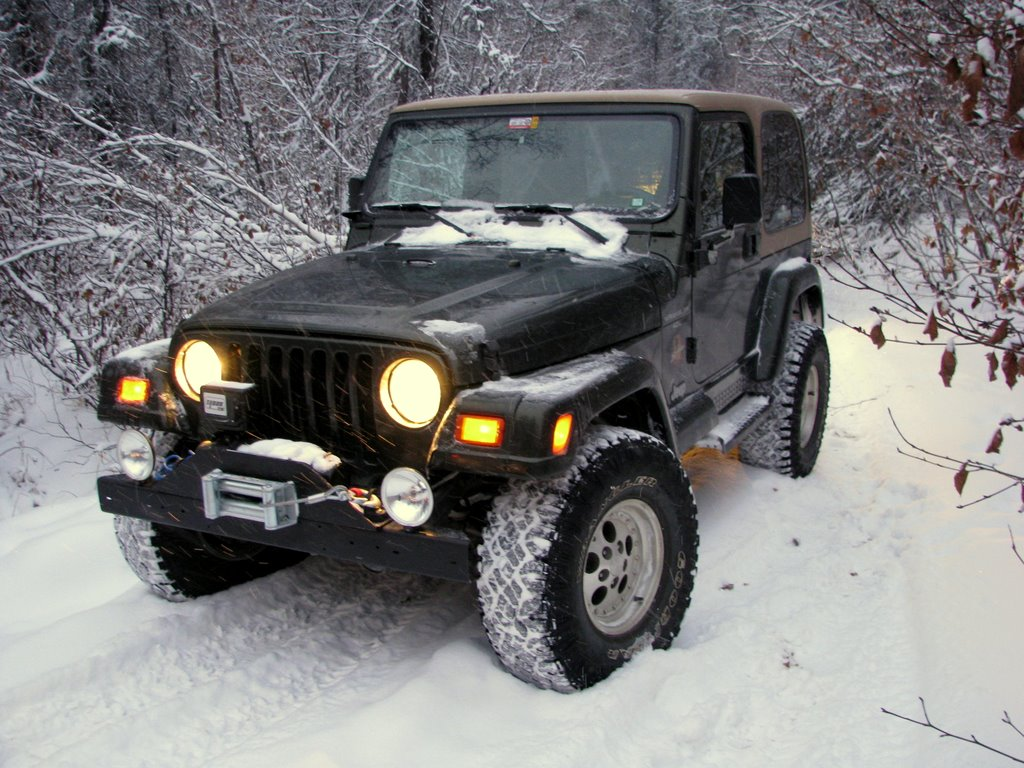
A modified 1998 TJ offroading in Alaska

In 1998 (MY1999), the fuel tank became standard at 19 U.S. gallons (72 L; 16 imp gal) capacity. There were some changes between 2002 and 2003. From 1996 to 2002, the side door mirrors were black metal-framed mirrors, and from 2003 to 2006, they were plastic molded mirrors. The fit of hard and soft tops is slightly different, and the fabric and colors available changed from 2001 to 2003. In 2002 (MY2003), the 3-speed automatic transmission was replaced with a 4-speed automatic with overdrive. The overdrive can be turned off with a dash switch. The radio bezels went from a rectangle in 2002 to a rounded-edged rectangle in 2003. The sound bar inside was changed to sound pods. The interior seats also changed design, going from a rounder model to one with a distinct separation between back and headrest areas. The standard skid plate was also revised for 2003 to make room for the Rubicon's bigger NV241OR transfer case. The change from the 30/32RH to the 42RLE also gained an additional skid plate.

This version of the Wrangler is also notable for being the last production vehicle to use AMC-related parts. The AMC Straight-4 engine was retired after the 2002 model year, and both the AMC straight-6 engine and the door handles (the latter of which first appeared on AMC vehicles in the 1968 model year) were retired along with this generation in 2006. Like the YJ Wrangler, the TJ Wrangler used both the AMC passenger car door handles as well as the larger door handles off the AMC-built Jeep CJ for higher-end models.

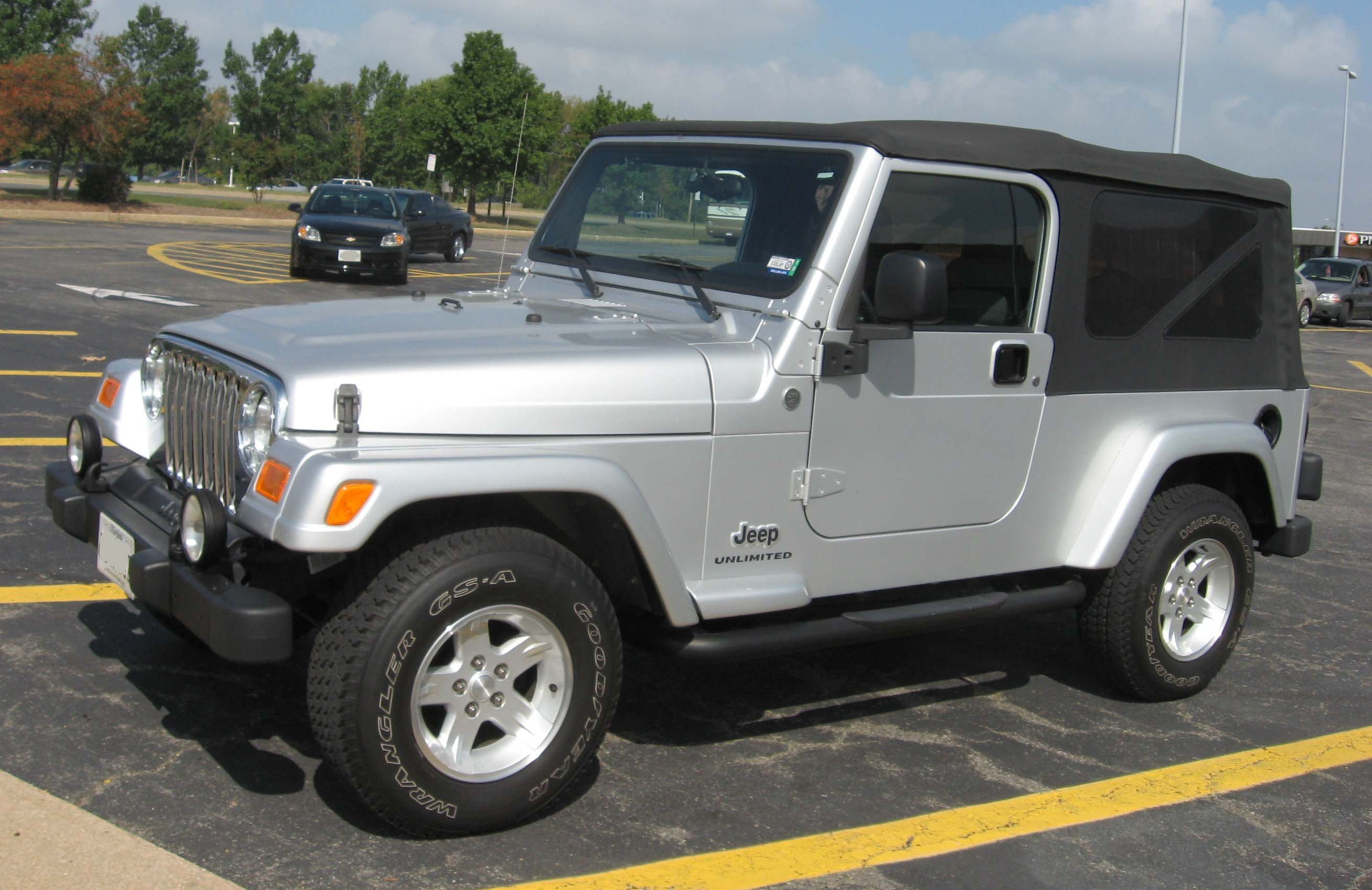
Jeep TJ Wrangler Unlimited soft-top

=== Postal Service ===
A right hand drive version of the TJ was available for export markets, and was also offered for sale to U.S. rural route postal carriers. The version offered to U.S. postal carriers was only available with an automatic transmission.

=== Wrangler Unlimited ===
In April 2004 – after a hiatus of 18 years – Jeep reintroduced a 10-inch (250 mm) longer wheelbase (LWB) version, virtually identical to the 103.5 in wheelbase of its Jeep CJ-6 and CJ-8 Scrambler predecessors, and called it the Wrangler Unlimited. The 2004½ Wrangler Unlimited (or LJ) was the first introduction of the Jeep Unlimited nameplate. The longer frame has one extra crossmember, and overall, the Unlimited is some 15 inches longer than a standard TJ, offering 2 inches more rear-seat legroom and 13 inches more cargo space. The TJ Unlimited has nearly double the towing capacity of its shorter wheelbase sibling, partly due to the increased wheelbase (3500 lbs LJ vs 2000 lbs TJ).
Standard was a Dana 44 rear axle with a 3.73 gear ratio and the Command-Trac NV231 transfer case.

For the 2005 model year, Jeep released the Rubicon Unlimited, combining the same wheelbase of the standard Unlimited, but sharing the drivetrain of its shorter Rubicon sibling including such features as front and rear Dana 44 axles with the Rock-Trac NV241 four-wheel-drive system, diamond plate rocker guards, 245/75R16 Goodyear MT/R tires, a six-speed manual or the optional 4 speed automatic transmission, as well as some minor comfort and convenience features not available on other Wrangler models.

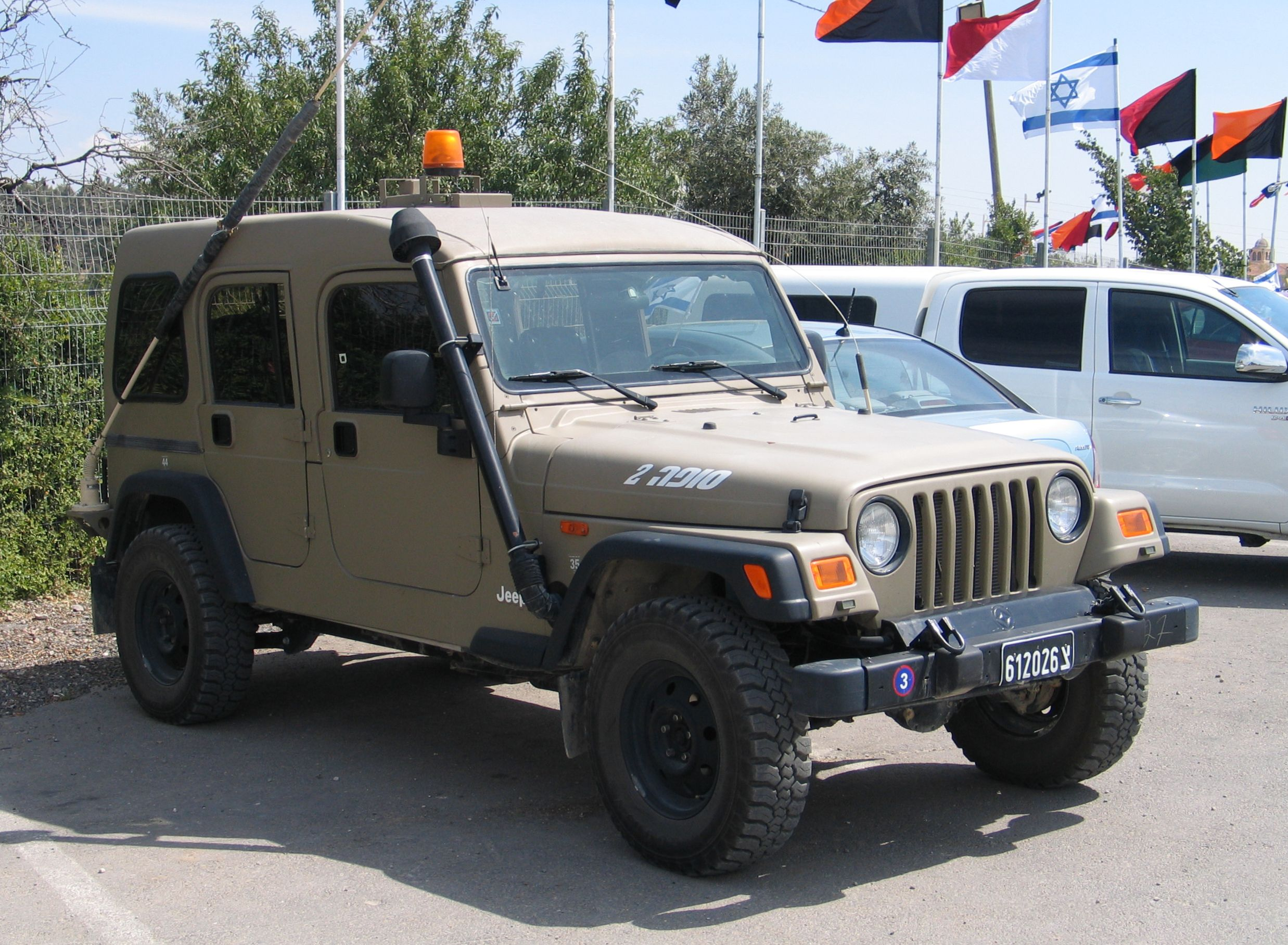
AIL Storm II "Commander"

=== AIL Storm Mark II ===
Starting in 2006, Automotive Industries Ltd. (AIL), an Israeli automaker and major supplier of the Israeli Security Forces, began delivery of their 2nd generation of "Storm" military jeeps, manufactured under licence from Chrysler, to the Israel Defense Forces. The M-242 Storm Mark II, known in the field as the "Storm Commander", was now based on the Jeep Wrangler (TJ). The new model incorporated several significant changes, both regarding its predecessor as well as compared to its Wrangler basis. Perhaps the most obvious change is the addition of dual passenger doors, making the Storm II the first five-door Jeep Wrangler derivative.
The AIL Storm II had a vehicle length of 4,463 mm (175.7 in), and an extended wheelbase of 2,931 mm (115.4 in) — almost the same as that of the JK Wrangler Unlimited: 116 in (2,946 mm).

== Trim levels ==
North American TJ/Wranglers were available in the following standard trims.

- SE: 1997–2006 models came standard with the 2.5 L from 1996 to 2002 production, and the 2.4 L from 2003 to 2006 production. The 4.0 L optional for 2005–2006. Standard features included an AM/FM stereo with two speakers (later, an AM/FM stereo with cassette player or single-disc CD player and four speakers), vinyl seats, and a rear removable bench seat. This model was also available as a right-hand-drive (RHD) rural mail carrier model, which included right-hand-drive (RHD) and a flip-out front window for easy mail delivery. The rural mail package included a Dana 44 rear axle and a hardtop with the 4.0 and the automatic transmission.
- X: 2002–2006 models came standard with 4.0 L, but no Dana 44 rear axle option. Standard features included a full-length center console courtesy lights, an AM/FM stereo with cassette player and four speakers (later, a CD player replaced the cassette player), but air conditioning was optional.
- Sport: 1997–2006 models came standard with 4.0 L and the Dana 35 rear axle. The Dana 44 rear axle, 3.73 axle ratio, and 30" wheel and tire group are optional. The Dana 44 could also be upgraded with a Trac-Lok limited-slip differential case. Standard features were an AM/FM stereo with cassette player and four speakers, and cloth seats.

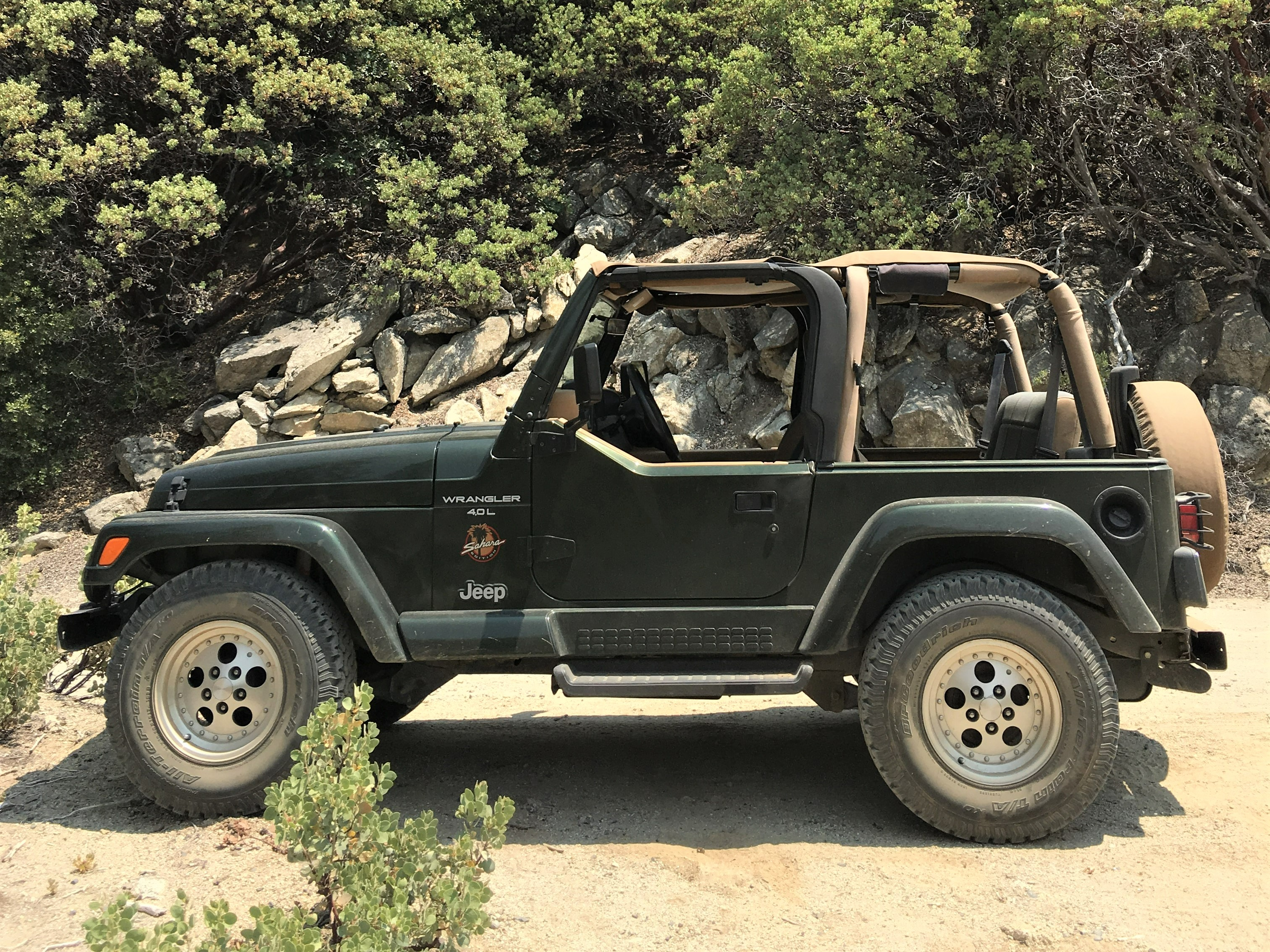
1998 Jeep Wrangler Sahara soft-top.

- Sahara: 1997–2004 models came standard with 4.0 L, wider body, colored fender flares, body colored rocker sills, optional 30-inch wheel and tire group, and full steel doors. The Sahara also features exclusive decals, seats, and trim. The Dana 44 rear axle and 3.73 axle ratio were optional. Standard features included an AM/FM stereo with cassette player and four speakers (later, a CD player replaced the cassette player, and seven premium speakers with center console-mounted subwoofer became standard), premium cloth seats, and alloy wheels. From 1996 to 2002, production, the seats was finished in a unique Camel/Forest Green color scheme.
- Unlimited Sport Edition: 2004-2006 model year came standard with 4.0 L and the Dana 44 rear limited slip axle with 3.73 gear ratio and the Command-Trac NV231 transfer case. The LJ has all the sport options but with a 10-inch (250 mm) longer wheelbase, aka the LWB or LJ model. The LJ Unlimited has 2 more inches of rear seat legroom and 13 inches more cargo storage. The LJ also came with an increased 3500 lbs towing capacity compared to the 2000 lbs towing capacity of the TJ.
- 60th Anniversary Edition: The 2001 model year came standard with all the features of a Sahara except for the seats, decals, and trim. It also came with the fog lamp and tow hook group, CD player with five-speaker sound system, air conditioning, and unique 60th Anniversary Edition decals and floor mats. The only two options were speed control and dual tops. Only two colors were available: black or silverstone metallic. A total of 4,067 were produced; 1,862 in black, 2,205 in silverstone.
- 65th Anniversary Edition: The 2006 model year came standard with all the options of a Sahara but without the rocker sills, seats, decals, and trim. It also came with fog lamps, a CD player with a 7-speaker sound system, and Sirius Satellite Radio, SunRider soft top, 30" tires with 15" Alcoa aluminum wheels, high-pressure gas-charged shocks, Dana 44 rear axle, and exclusive 65th Anniversary Edition seats, trim, floor mats, and decals. The available colors were light khaki, dark khaki, bright silver, black, and Jeep Green. Around 1600 were made.
- Apex Edition: 2002–2003 model years came standard with the 4.0 L, CD player with 7 speaker sound system, and exclusive hood decal and seats. It only came in three colors: silver, blue, or black. It also included standard features such as chrome-plated styled steel wheels and cognac-finished "Ultra-Hide" seats.
- Columbia Edition: 2004 model year came standard with the 4.0 L, fog lamps, and graphite fender flares, 15-inch graphite painted aluminum wheels, two-tone seats with Columbia logo, unique trim, and Columbia decals. It only came in five colors: black, bright silver, flame red, solar yellow, or patriot blue. Each of the unique jeeps came with a Columbia Bugaboo parka.
- Freedom Edition: 2003 model years came standard with the 4.0 L, full metal doors, fog lamp and tow hook group, body colored fender flares, exclusive decals, chrome wheels, air conditioning, anti-theft system, and fold and tumble rear seat. It only came in four colors: red, silver, blue, or black, with either vinyl or cloth slate gray seats.

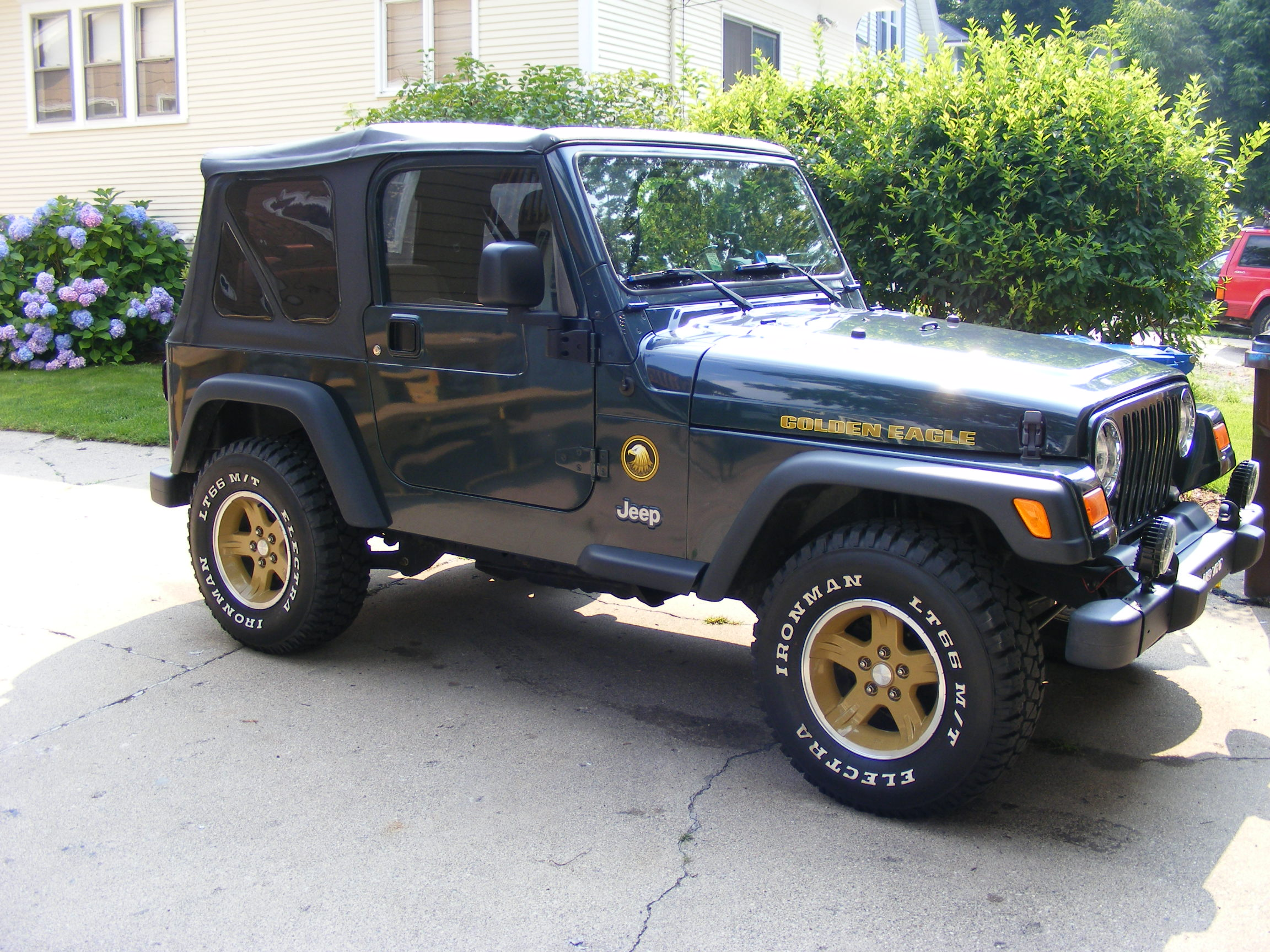
2006 Golden Eagle.

- Golden Eagle: 2006 model years came standard with the 4.0 L, 30" Wheel and tire group, Dana 44 rear axle, exclusive hood, interior trim, seats, fender, and spare tire decals.
- Rocky Mountain Edition: 2003–2005 model years came standard with the 4.0 L, Dana 44 rear axle (beginning in 2004), 30" Wheel and tire group (with 15" Alcoa aluminum wheels), fog lamp and tow hook group, exclusive decals, fender flares, seats, and interior trim and Diamond plate rocker guards. It only came in five colors: black, silver, red, yellow, and blue. It also included seven premium speakers with a subwoofer and unique cloth seats.

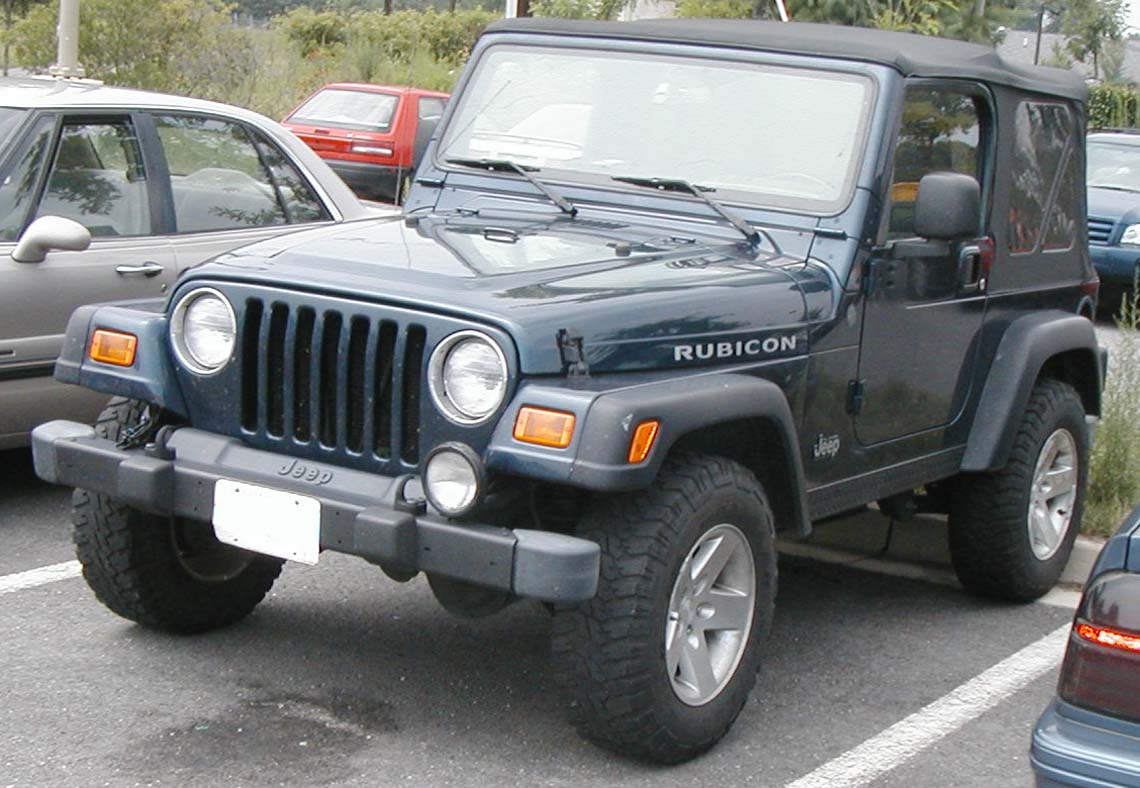
Stock Jeep Wrangler Rubicon

- Rubicon: The Wrangler Rubicon (named for the famed Rubicon Trail in the Sierra Nevada Mountains) was introduced in the summer of 2002. It featured front and rear air-actuated locking Dana 44 axles with the Rock-Trac NV241 4:1 ratio transfer case, diamond plate rocker panels, 16-inch alloy wheels, and Goodyear MTR P245/75-R16 tires. From 2003 and 2004 featured a standard New Venture Gear NV3550 five-speed manual transmission, which changed in 2004 (2005 model) to the NSG370, a Mercedes-sourced six-speed. The optional 42RLE four-speed automatic transmission was available from 2003 to 2006.
- Sahara Edition Unlimited Rubicon: 2005 model year, Paramount released the movie Sahara which featured a Jeep Wrangler. As a way to build on the success of the movie, Jeep released a limited production "Sahara Edition" Unlimited Rubicon. A total of 1000 were produced, and each one is numbered. All of them are visually identical, but some were offered with a manual transmission and others with an automatic. They are all Light Khaki Unlimiteds. Trim differences over the standard Rubicon include chrome grille, khaki hard top or soft top, as well as optional dual khaki tops, Graphite Moab wheels, a Sahara spare tire cover, upgraded two-tone premium seats, Sahara decals, taillight guards, and a numbered dash badge.
- Tomb Raider Edition: 2003 model year was a limited run of 1,001 (perhaps as many as 1,050) Wrangler Rubicon "Tomb Raider" models produced promote the Tomb Raider sequel, Lara Croft: Tomb Raider – The Cradle of Life. Along with the standard Rubicon fare, it also included exterior features such as 16-inch Alcoa forged aluminum wheels, Tomb Raider badging, and Mopar accessories including a light bar, riveted fender flares, tubular grille guard, diamond-plated bumper guard, etc. Interior features included Dark Slate fabric seats with red accent stitching down the center, silver surround instrument panel bezel, red seat belts, and a Tomb Raider badge with serial number. To match the vehicle in the film, it was offered in Bright Silver. Due to its classic styling, combined with numerous unique accessories, the 2003 "Tomb Raider" Limited Edition Wrangler Rubicon has become one of the most highly collectible jeeps of all time.
- Willys Edition: 2004–2005 model years came standard with the 4.0 L, fog lamp, and tow hook group, exclusive "WILLYS" decals, CD player with 7 speaker sound system, body-color fender flares, green diamond plate rocker guards, camouflage seats, dark green soft top, and a full-size spare tire with matching wheel. It was only available in moss green. Jeep sold about 1000 units in 2004, and hoped to double that number for the 2005 model year. A variation of the edition known as the 35X package, included everything except the military logos and optional moss green fog light covers and tail light guards.

== Powertrain ==
Engine	Year	Transmission
2.5 L AMC Straight-4 engine	1997–2002	3-speed 30RH automatic
2.5 L AMC Straight-4 engine	1997–2002	5-speed AX-5 manual
2.4 L PowerTech	2003–2006	4-speed 42RLE automatic
2.4 L PowerTech	2003–2004	5-speed NV1500 manual
2.4 L PowerTech	2005–2006	6-speed NSG370 manual
4.0 L AMC Straight-6 engine	1997–2002	3-speed 32RH automatic
4.0 L AMC Straight-6 engine	2003–2006	4-speed 42RLE automatic
4.0 L AMC Straight-6 engine	1997–1999	5-speed AX-15 manual
4.0 L AMC Straight-6 engine	2000–2004	5-speed NV3550 manual
4.0 L AMC Straight-6 engine	2005–2006	6-speed NSG370 manual

== Steering system ==
Jeep Wrangler TJ uses a recirculating ball-type steering gear.

== 2003 model year update ==
For the 2003 model year, the Jeep Wrangler TJ received a mid-cycle restyling. On the exterior, there were new wheel designs to choose from, as well as new exterior decals. Under the hood, a new 2.4L "Power-Tech" Inline Four-Cylinder (I4) gas engine from the Jeep Liberty KJ, producing 147 horsepower and 165 lb. ft. of torque, replaced the 2.5L Inline Four-Cylinder (I4) gas engine that was shared with the Jeep Cherokee (XJ). A new off-road focused Rubicon model was introduced. The Ultradrive 42RLE automatic transmission became the sole automatic transmission regardless of engine choice. On the interior, a new steering wheel derived from the Jeep Grand Cherokee (WJ) was added, and interior switch gear was also revised. All audio systems were redesigned, and the standard audio system was now an A/M-F/M stereo radio with a cassette player (a single-disc CD player was also available, and a six-disc, in-dash CD changer replaced the previous remotely-mounted unit). A standard four-speaker audio system and an optional seven-speaker premium audio system with a front center console-mounted subwoofer and amplifier were both available. Sirius Satellite Radio became available for the first time on the Wrangler. The seats were redesigned with new fabrics and improved comfort. The key was also redesigned with a new round head.

== 2006 model year ==
2006 was the final model year for the Jeep Wrangler TJ and Jeep Wrangler TJ Unlimited before being replaced by the all-new, third-generation Jeep Wrangler (JK) and Jeep Wrangler (JK) Unlimited. For 2006, two new special edition models were offered for the regular-wheelbase Wrangler TJ: a 65TH Anniversary Edition and the Golden Eagle Edition, both paying tribute to Jeep's heritage (the Golden Eagle was an option package for the Jeep CJ-7, and the 65TH Anniversary Edition celebrated 65 years of production for the Jeep brand). The 4.0L "Power-Tech" Inline Six-Cylinder (I6) engine became standard equipment on all Wrangler TJ models, as the 2.4L "Power-Tech" Inline Four-Cylinder (I4) gas engine was dropped, and all Wrangler TJ models now featured the Chrysler NSG370 transmission (manual transmission) as standard equipment, as the five-speed manual transmission was dropped in 2005. The all-new 2007 Jeep Wrangler (JK) and first-ever Jeep Wrangler (JK) Unlimited were introduced at the 2006 North American International Auto Show (NAIAS) in Detroit, Michigan in January 2006.
