= New Venture Gear 3500 transmission =

Manual automobile transmission

The New Venture Gear 3500, commonly called NV3500, is a 5-speed overdrive manual transmission manufactured by New Venture Gear and used by GM and Dodge in compact and full-size light trucks.
It can be identified by its two-piece aluminum case with integrated bell housing and top-mounted tower shifter.

== Similar transmissions ==
In North America the NV3550 is used by Jeep with the 4.0L inline 6. It looks similar to and could be mistaken for the Dodge NV3500. However the Jeep NV3550 bellhousing bolts to the transmission case.

There are four GM medium duty transmission designs that led to and are often mistaken for the NV3500:

- 1987 MG-290 MG= Muncie Gear
- 1988 HM-290 HM= Hydramatic Muncie
- 1989 5LM60 (early)
- 1991 NVG 5LM60 (lateNVG= New Venture Gear
- 1993 New Venture Gear releases the NV3500. Externally the earlier GM units look like the NV3500; however the internal components were extensively redesigned.
  - The HM290 and 5LM60 units have a complicated arrangement of 4 shift rails. The NV3500 has one shift rail.
  - There are two designs for the 5LM60 input shaft and bearings (input shaft and main shaft). The first design 1988–1990 has a ball bearing with a roller bearing behind it. The second design has a much larger single ball bearing. The first design bearings are reputed to be failure prone. The updated input shaft and bearings carried through to the NV3500.
  - The clutch slave cylinder moves from an external design with a pivot arm to an internal design with a slave piston concentric with the input shaft. The latter design makes use of space inside the bellhousing for the slave cylinder which means that in some applications, the external slave cylinder design will have the slave cylinder interfere with other vehicle components if the vehicle was factory equipped with the concentric slave cylinder.
- All 5 of these transmissions can be interchanged as a complete unit with the following caveats.
  - "Drop-in" interchanges between GM S (S10 etc.) and C/K trucks will require modification of driveshaft length and crossmember placement. GM S models have a longer tail-shaft than C/K trucks.
  - Master & slave cylinder bore sizes went from standard to metric in 1992 (Master: 11/16"->18mm, Slave 13/16" ->20mm)
  - GM and Dodge transmissions will not interchange.
    - The case and bellhousing are one piece with differing, engine specific, bellhousing bolt patterns.
    - Dodge uses Dodge specific input shaft length, spline count, and pilot diameter.
    - Dodge output spline count differs from the GM units.

== Lubrication ==
Lubricants for the NV3500:

- OEM Recommended:
  - Mopar Manual Transmission Lubricant (4874464)
  - GM Synchromesh Transmission Fluid (in US 12377916 in Canada 10953465)
- Less expensive alternatives CERTIFIED to meet GM 9985648 and Chrysler MS-9224:
  - AMSOIL Synthetic Synchromesh Transmission Fluid (MTF)
  - Pennzoil Synchromesh Fluid
  - Royal Purple Synchromax
  - Royal Purple Max Gear
  - RAVENOL STF Synchromesh Transmission Fluid

Capacity:

- NV3500 4.2 pints DRY is stated in the Owners Manual and the Service Manual.
- NV3500-HD 2.0 Litres is stated in the Owners Manual and the Service Manual.
  - When performing a fluid change some of the old oil will not drain out.

NOTE:

- 5W30 engine oil does not contain additives for use in manual transmissions.
- Additives in standard gear and axle lubes will etch the bronze synchronizers and 80W oil will not properly flow into the NV3500 bearings.

== Applications of the NV3500 ==
- 1993–1998 Chevrolet & GMC CK with 4.3 liter V6 and 5.0 liter V8 and 5.7 liter V8
- 1999–2006 Chevrolet Silverado 1500 and 2500LD
- 1999–2006 GMC Sierra 1500 and 2500LD
- 1993–2003 GM S (S10, Blazer, etc.) trucks with 4.3 liter V6
- 1994–2004 Dodge Ram 1500
- 1994–1995 Dodge Ram 2500 Light Duty
- 1994-2004 Dodge Dakota
- 2002-2004 Jeep Liberty with 3.7 L PowerTech V6
- 2000-2004 Jeep Wrangler with 4.0 AMC Straight 6

Dodge Ram order code DDC

General Motors RPO codes
Full-size CK, Silverado, Sierra MG5
Small trucks S10 etc. M50

== Features ==
- Single shift rail unlike the HM290 and 5LM60
- Distance between the centerline of the mainshaft and the countershaft is 85mm.
- Fully synchronized forward and reverse gears.
- A two-piece aluminum housing with no access plates.
- A shift tower-mounted shift lever.
- GM RPO codes;
  - Wide-ratio MG5
  - Close-ratio M50
- Dodge order code DDC
- The medium-duty version is rated for 300 ft-lbf of torque
- The Dodge Dakota NV3500-HD version was rated for 340 ft-lb of torque. There is no GM variant of the NV3500-HD.
- Max GVWR: 7,200 lb
- Max GCWR: 11,000 lb
- Weight 110 lb with oil

Wide Ratio Gearing Option in Dodge 1500 & GM Full-size Light Trucks:

| 1 | 2 | 3 | 4 | 5 | R |
|---|---|---|---|---|---|
| 4.02 | 2.32 | 1.40 | 1.00 | 0.73 | 3.55 |

Close Ratio GM S/T Small Trucks & 2500 Light Duty Dodge Ram Truck Gearing:

| 1 | 2 | 3 | 4 | 5 | R |
|---|---|---|---|---|---|
| 3.49 | 2.16 | 1.40 | 1.00 | 0.73 | 3.55 |

Close Ratio NV3500-HD Dodge Dakota Gearing:

| 1 | 2 | 3 | 4 | 5 | R |
|---|---|---|---|---|---|
| 3.49 | 2.14 | 1.38 | 1.00 | 0.73 | 3.55 |
