= Jeep Liberty (KK) =

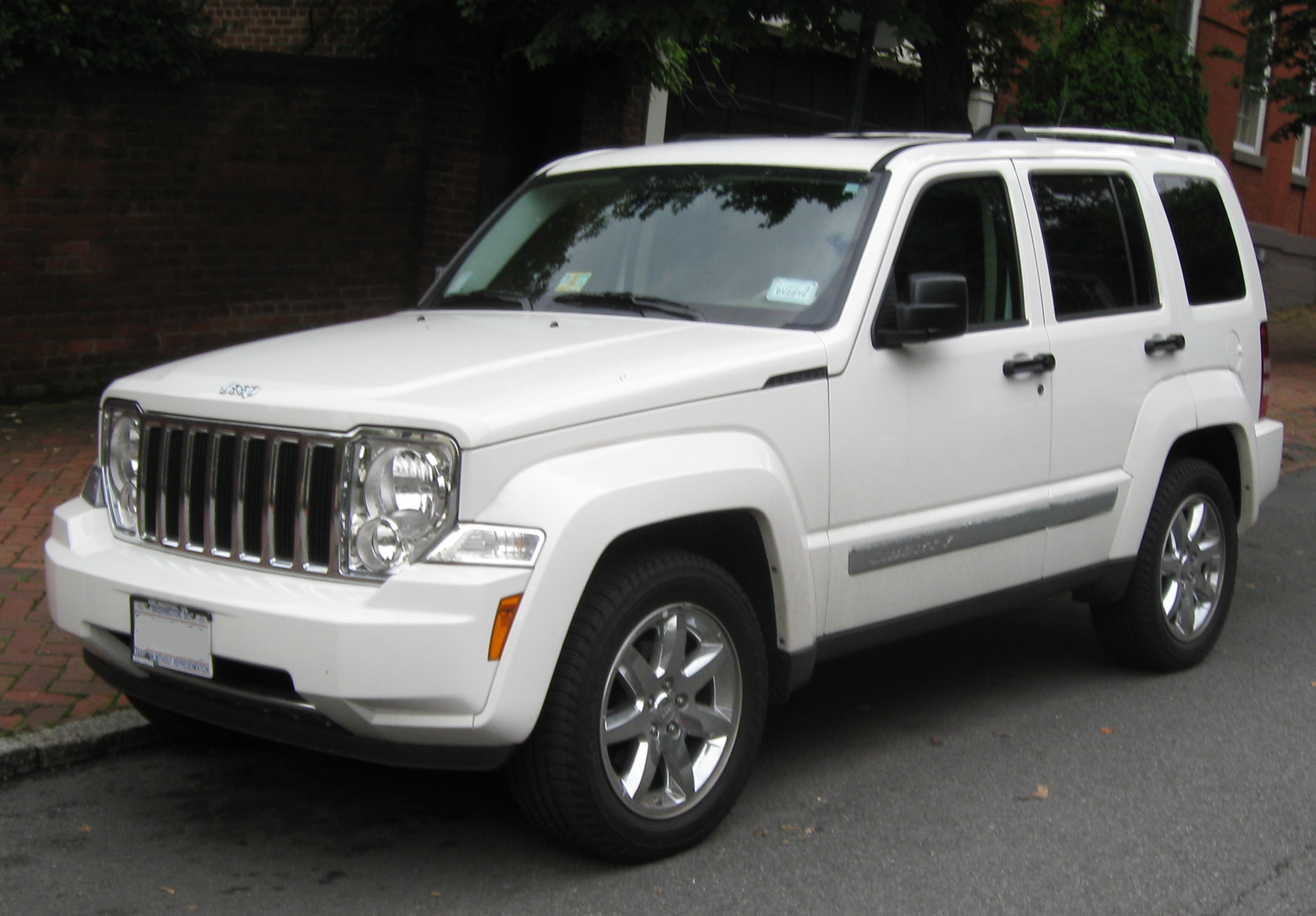

Overview
- Manufacturer: Chrysler LLC (2008–2009); Chrysler Group LLC (2010–2012)
- Also called: Jeep Cherokee (KK)
- Production: 2007–August 16, 2012
- Model years: 2008–2012
- Designer: Dan Zimmermann (2004)

Body and chassis
- Layout: Front engine, rear-wheel drive / four-wheel drive
- Related: Dodge Nitro; Jeep Grand Cherokee; Jeep Commander; Jeep Wrangler

Powertrain
- Engine: 2.8 L VM Motori RA 428 DOHC CRD I4 (turbo-diesel); 3.7 L Chrysler PowerTech V6 (gasoline)
- Transmission: 4-speed Ultradrive 42RLE automatic; 5-speed Mercedes-Benz W5A580 automatic; 6-speed Chrysler NSG370 manual

Dimensions
- Wheelbase: 106.1 in (2,695 mm)
- Length: 176.9 in (4,493 mm) (2008–2010); 176.1 in (4,473 mm) (2011–2013)
- Width: 72.4 in (1,839 mm) (2008–2010); 73.1 in (1,857 mm) (2011–2013)
- Height: 74.9 in (1,902 mm) (2008–2010); 71.3 in (1,811 mm) (2011–2013)
- Curb weight: 3,985–4,780 lb (1,808–2,168 kg)

Chronology
- Predecessor: Jeep Liberty (KJ)
- Successor: Jeep Cherokee (KL)

The Jeep Liberty (KK), or Jeep Cherokee (KK) outside North America, is a compact SUV that was manufactured by Jeep. Introduced in 2008 as a successor to the first generation Liberty (KJ). The Liberty features unibody construction and was assembled at the Toledo North Assembly Plant in the United States and other countries, including Egypt and Venezuela. In 2010, Jeep estimated that 70% of Liberty buyers were first-time Jeep owners.

== Description ==
The Jeep Liberty received a complete redesign for the 2008 model year with a more boxy and utilitarian look, like that of the 2007 Dodge Nitro, the latter of which lasted until its final production in December 2011. The 2008 Liberty debuted at the 2007 New York International Auto Show.

With the smaller Patriot and Compass crossover SUVs becoming available to cater to MPG-conscious buyers, the four-cylinder diesel engine was dropped from the Liberty's offerings. The iron-block, aluminum-head V6 was the only engine available for 2008. Towing capacity was 5,000 lb (2,268 kg). Jeep discontinued the Liberty CRD for the American market because it would not meet tougher 2013 emissions standards for diesel engines. Between 2008 and 2010, the Jeep Liberty KK was sold in the European market with a 2.8 L diesel engine producing 175 hp and 302–339 lb ft of torque. The Inline 4-cylinder turbo diesel engine is manufactured by Italian diesel engine manufacturer VM Motori.

Transmission choices were both carry-overs: a six-speed manual or a four-speed automatic. Standard equipment included electronic stability control with roll mitigation, traction control, and anti-lock brakes with brake assist. New Features included standard side airbags. Optional features are rain-sensing wipers, Sirius Satellite Radio, Bluetooth, a navigation system, and the MyGig entertainment system, complete with a 30GB hard drive.

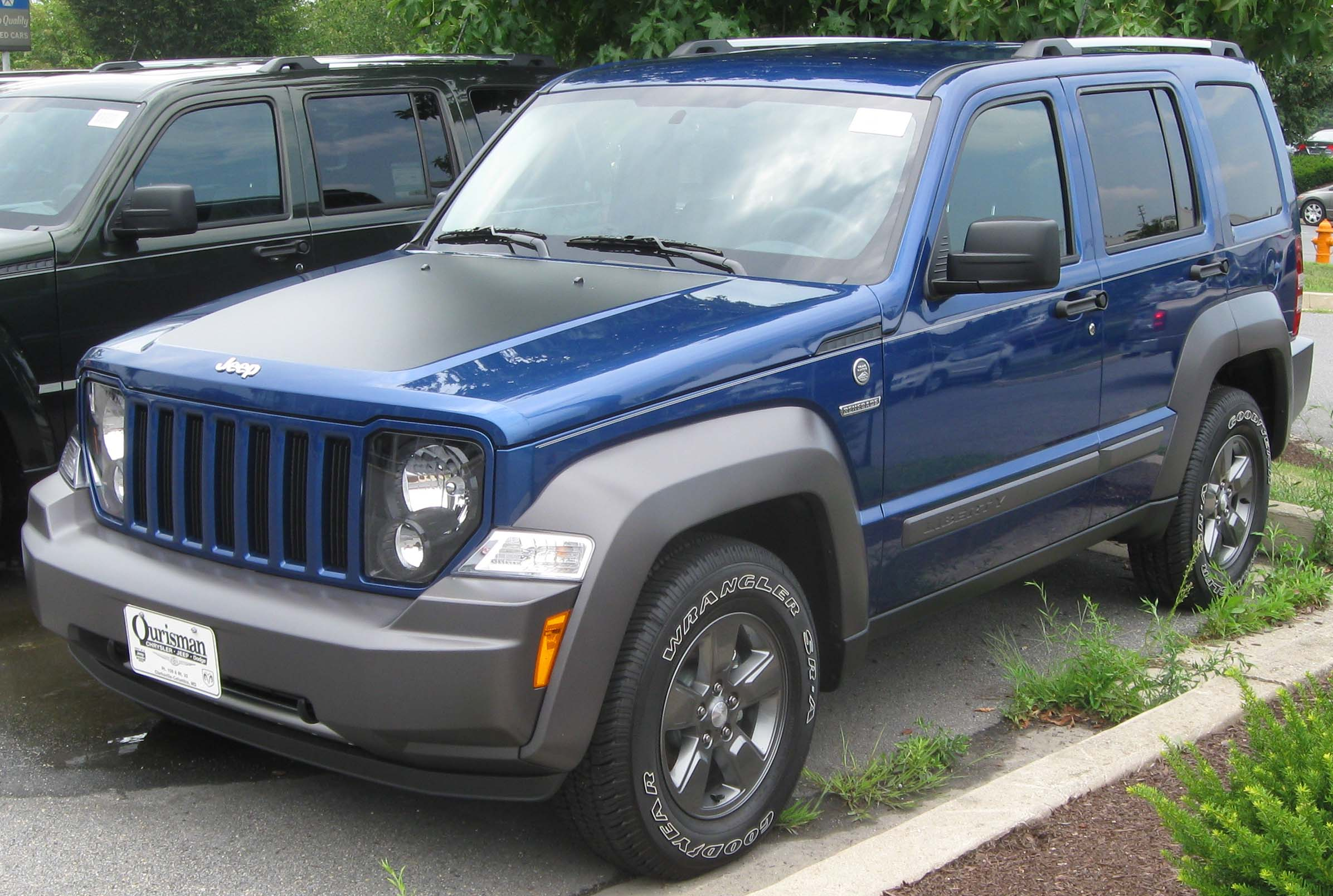
2010 Jeep Liberty Renegade

Two models were offered initially, the base "Sport" and a higher-trimmed "Limited." Wheel choices included several 16-, 17-, and 18-inch designs. Among the more distinctive features was the Sky Slider, a power roof made from "reinforced acrylic cloth" over the front and rear seats. The Sky Slider retracted to an 60 inches (1,500 mm) by 30 inches (760 mm) opening that was the largest in its class. Jeep claimed that the idea behind the Sky Slider was to give consumers the open-air feeling from previous Jeep models while maintaining the rigidity and safety of a sturdy frame.

The 2009 Liberty appearance was unchanged from the 2008 models. Upgrades included stiffer rear axle shafts and re-tuned springs, shocks, anti-roll bars, steering gear valve, low rollback brake calipers, and a revised brake pedal ratio. The six-speed manual transmission was dropped, and the four-speed automatic became standard.

== 2011 Restyling ==
For the 2011 model year, the Liberty KK received a mid-cycle restyling. While the general exterior design remained identical to the 2008-2010 model, the interior was restyled to be similar to that of the all-new 2011 Jeep Grand Cherokee (WK2), with a new steering wheel, and revised infotainment systems that became included with wireless stereo audio streaming (A2DP) in vehicles equipped with U Connect Bluetooth (the top-tier Limited and Limited Jet Edition trims received this feature as standard equipment), and a Park View rear view backup camera became available for vehicles equipped with touchscreen infotainment systems. The mid-level Limited trim was shelved for retail buyers, and a new Limited Jet Edition was introduced to take its place. The Limited model, which remained available for fleet buyers (such as rental companies), received a higher level of standard equipment, including leather seat trim, heated front seats, the 368-watt, eight-speaker Infinity premium amplified audio system with a subwoofer, and U Connect Bluetooth. A 'SINCE 1941' embossing was added to the interior to celebrate Jeep's 70th Anniversary, and a special 70th Anniversary Edition model was also offered. Three new trims, Sport Jet Edition, Latitude, and Limited Jet Edition, were introduced midyear.

== Trim levels and special editions ==
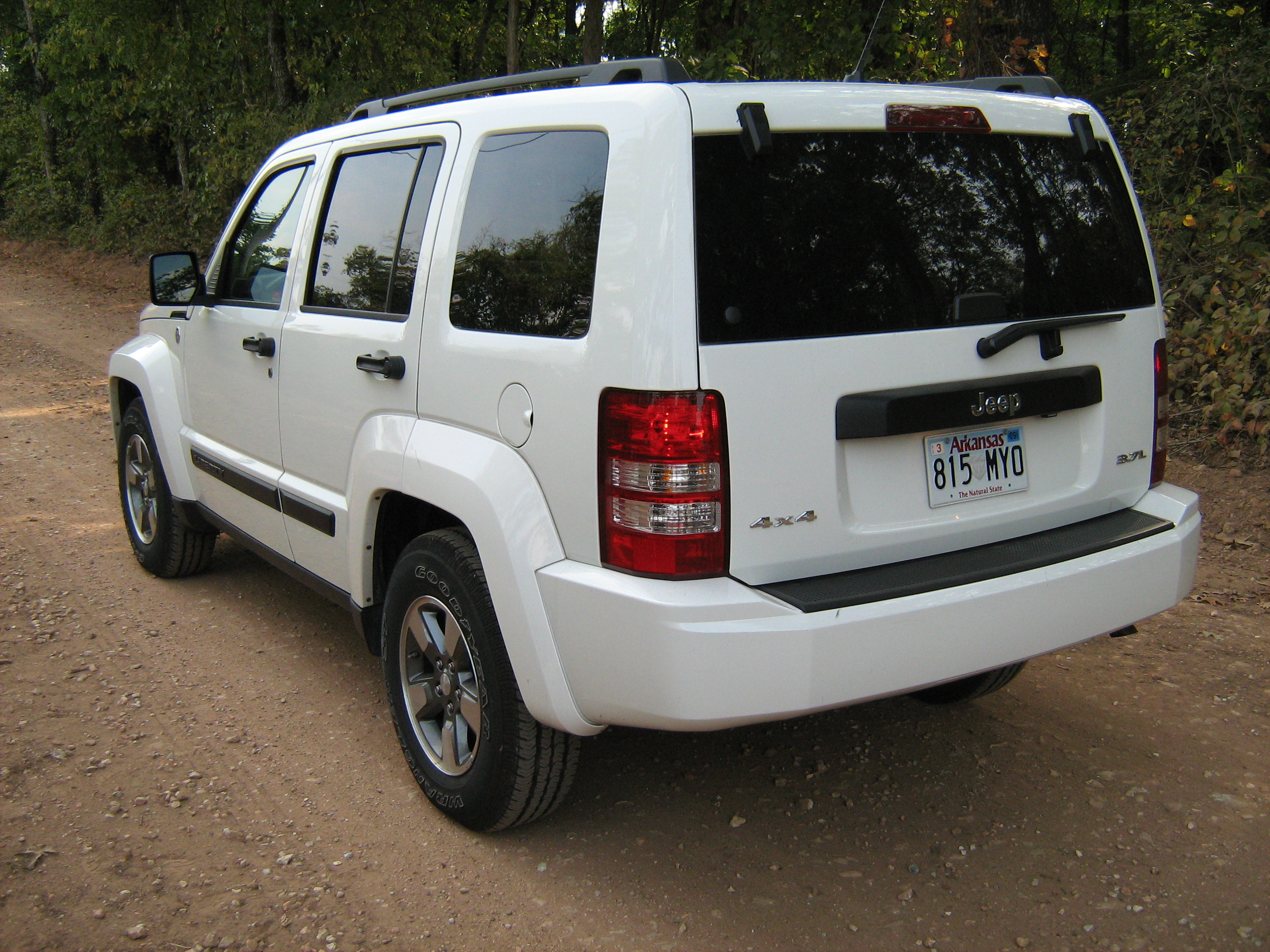
2008 Jeep Liberty

Throughout its five-year production, the Jeep Liberty KK was available in two basic trim levels:

The Sport served as the base model and included a standard 3.7 L Powertech V6 engine producing 210 horsepower, a six-speed manual transmission (later, an automatic transmission became standard equipment), air conditioning, an AM/FM stereo with a single-disc CD/MP3 player, and 3.5-millimeter auxiliary audio input jack, a four-speaker sound system (later, a six-speaker sound system became standard equipment), 16-inch tires and alloy wheels, power windows and door locks, keyless entry, cloth seating surfaces, a split-folding rear seat. Options such as the Sky-Slider fabric sunroof, UConnect hands-free Bluetooth phone with A2DP wireless stereo audio streaming capabilities, remote audio system controls mounted on the steering wheel, an automatic transmission (this later became standard equipment), darkened 17-inch alloy wheels, and a full-size spare.

The Limited added, among other standard equipment, an automatic transmission, UConnect hands-free Bluetooth phone, A2DP wireless stereo audio streaming capabilities, voice command for phone, satellite radio, leather-wrapped steering wheel with remote audio system controls, six-speaker sound system, power front driver's seat, security system, 17-inch tires and alloy wheels, full-size spare, dual-zone climate controls, and a vinyl rear cargo shade. Options such as leather-trimmed seating surfaces, heated power dual front bucket seats, an eight-speaker premium sound system with an Infinity subwoofer, a touch-screen sound system, the Sky-Slider fabric sunroof, and 18-inch chrome-clad alloy wheels mounted on all-season tires.

The Liberty KK was offered in five special edition models:

The Renegade, sold from 2009 to 2011, added the Selec-Trac II full-time four-wheel-drive transfer case, darkened 16-inch alloy wheels with all-terrain tires, UConnect hands-free Bluetooth phone, and A2DP wireless stereo audio streaming capabilities, voice command for phone, satellite radio, remote audio system controls on the steering wheel, unique seat fabrics, full-size spare, and black hood decal.

The Arctic Edition was available for the 2012 model. This version added unique cloth seating surfaces, a full-sized spare, darkened 16-inch alloy wheels, UConnect hands-free Bluetooth phone with A2DP wireless stereo audio streaming capabilities, voice command for phone, satellite radio, remote steering wheel-mounted audio system controls, and unique embroidery on both front seatbacks.

The Latitude was available from 2010 to 2012. It added 18-inch chrome-clad alloy wheels mounted on all-season tires, cloth seating surfaces with vinyl accents, a leather-wrapped steering wheel with remote audio system controls, U Connect hands-free Bluetooth phone, A2DP wireless stereo audio streaming capabilities, voice command for phone, satellite radio, and a chrome front grille.

The 70th Anniversary Edition was available only for the 2011 Limited. This version added unique alloy wheels, 70th Anniversary Edition emblems on both front doors, unique leather-trimmed seating surfaces available in two special color schemes, a touch-screen sound system, a premium eight-speaker sound system with an Infinity subwoofer, heated front bucket seats, and dual power front bucket seats.

The Jet Edition was available in 2011 and 2012 on the Sport and Limited trim levels. It added unique chrome-clad alloy wheels, power front bucket seats, unique seat trim, and special Jet emblems for each trim level. The Limited Jet Edition added heated front bucket seats, leather-trimmed seating surfaces with Axis perforated suede microfiber inserts, a touch-screen display with a premium eight-speaker sound system with an Infinity subwoofer, and a Sky-Slider fabric sunroof.

== Discontinuation ==
In June 2012, Chrysler announced the Toledo North Assembly Plant in Toledo, Ohio, where the Liberty is manufactured, will temporarily shut down on August 21, 2012, to prepare for the launch of the new Jeep Cherokee. Production was to start in late spring 2013, following the introduction of the new Cherokee at the 2013 New York Auto Show.

The second-generation Liberty ceased production to make way for the reintroduction of the new Cherokee. The final 2012 model Jeep Liberty rolled off the assembly line on August 16, 2012.

== Recalls ==
On June 7, 2011, Chrysler issued a safety recall on the 2011 model Jeep Liberty because they were possibly built with a missing or incorrectly installed steering column pivot rivet. On July 14, 2011 Chrysler issued another recall, calling another 11,000 vehicles in for inspection.

On December 7, 2011, Chrysler issued a Customer Satisfaction Notification recall on Jeep Liberties manufactured between 2010 and 2011 equipped with power door locks. The malfunction caused the right front and right rear door locks to make a ratcheting sound while using the power door locks.

On July 2, 2013, Chrysler issued the first of several recalls addressing the Active Head Restraints failing to deploy during a rear-end collision. The recall was issued on nearly half a million vehicles manufactured through January 14, 2013. Among them were the 2011 and 2012 Jeep Liberty. Three other recalls up until 2017 were issued concerning the same issue.

The Jeep Liberty KK was also a subject of the infamous Takata airbag recall that affected millions of vehicles from multiple manufacturers. According to the recall, "In the event of a crash necessitating deployment of one of the affected frontal air bags, the inflator could rupture with metal fragments striking and potentially seriously injuring the vehicle occupants."

== Fleet and government use ==
From its introduction for the 2008 model year until its discontinuation and replacement by the Cherokee KL in 2012, the Liberty KK found its way into rental car fleets, most vehicles being base-model Sport models in 2WD or 4WD.

Many government and police fleets also used the Liberty KK. The models were base-model Sport models with 4WD.

== Total U.S. sales ==
Calendar Year	Sales
2007	92,105
2008	66,911
2009	43,503
2010	49,564
2011	66,684
2012	75,483
2013	6,101
Total	400,351

== See also ==
- Jeep Liberty
