= New Venture Gear =

American automobile company (1990–2012)

- Industry: Vehicle Transmissions
- Predecessor: New Process Rawhide Company; Warner Gear Company
- Founded: 1990; 36 years ago
- Founder: Chrysler Corporation; General Motors
- Defunct: August 20, 2012
- Fate: Dissolved
- Successor: Magna Powertrain
- Headquarters: Syracuse, New York, United States
- Parent: Magna Powertrain

New Venture Gear was an automobile and light truck transmission company that was started in 1990 as the first-ever joint venture between any of the Big Three U.S. automakers. General Motors and Chrysler Corporation were the participants. Operation and management of Chrysler's New Process Gear plant in Syracuse, New York, and GM's underutilized Hydramatic transmission plant in Muncie, Indiana, were shifted to New Venture Gear Company.

== History ==
=== Founding plant histories ===
==== Hydramatic Muncie ====
In 1902, Thomas W. Warner formed the Warner Gear Company in Muncie, Indiana, to manufacture automobile parts, steering, and transmission gears. In 1919, General Motors purchased the T. W. Warner Company, including its land and buildings. In 1920, GM reopened the plant under the name Muncie Products to manufacture transmissions and steering gear for their Oakland, Pontiac, Oldsmobile, Chevrolet, and GMC Truck divisions. In 1932, GM closed the Muncie Products plant and consolidated operations to other divisions in response to the failing economy of the Great Depression.

The Chevrolet division reopened the plant in 1935 to build car and truck transmissions. World War II halted non-military vehicle production and the plant was converted to serve the needs of the U.S. military until the war ended. The 1950s and 1960s saw expansion and growth. In the 1970s and 1980s, GM swapped the plant to many different GM divisions, ending with Detroit Diesel Allison in 1984 and GM Hydramatic in 1986.

==== New Process Gear ====
In 1888, Thomas W. Meachem founded the New Process Rawhide Company in Baldwinsville, New York. In the late 1890s, New Process Rawhide moved operations to Syracuse after a fire. In 1913, Thomas W. Meachem reorganized New Process Rawhide with one of his partners, Artemus Vosburgh. The company was renamed New Process Gear to reflect the new corporate direction. In 1954, after a succession of owners including Willys-Overland, New Process Gear became a subsidiary of Chrysler Corporation.

=== New Venture Gear ===
In 1990, the Hydramatic Muncie plant owned by GM and New Process Gear owned by Chrysler formed a joint GM–Chrysler venture called New Venture Gear.

=== GM exit ===
In February 2002, General Motors sold its minority 36% stake in the New Venture Gear company to DaimlerChrysler and the Muncie Transmission plant reverted to GM control. GM changed the plant name to "Manual Transmissions of Muncie." The T.W. Warner Muncie plant closed in mid-2006 after a century of operation and the property was turned over to Delaware County Indiana. The GM Muncie Transmission plant was demolished soon after turnover to the county. The Syracuse New Process remained with New Venture Gear.

In 2004, Magna International purchased 80% of New Venture Gear from DaimlerChrysler and put it under Magna Drivetrain. Magna purchased the remaining 20% interest in 2007. The New Process gear plant remained property of DaimlerChrysler. Chrysler then leased the facilities to Magna. This lease arrangement made it difficult to compete with the European manufacturing operation Magna directly purchased located in Roitzsch, Germany. A downturn in Jeep demand combined with DaimlerChrysler not replacing the Dodge Neon sharply curtailed demand for the Syracuse New Process Gear plant production. In 2009, design and engineering services were moved to Troy, Michigan, and Magna International announced its intent to close the Syracuse plant. The Syracuse New Process Gear plant had been planned for closure in November 2011, but was pushed back to the first quarter of 2012.

After 124 years in operation, on Thursday, August 24, 2012, New Process Gear ended production and closed their doors for the last time.

== Transmissions ==
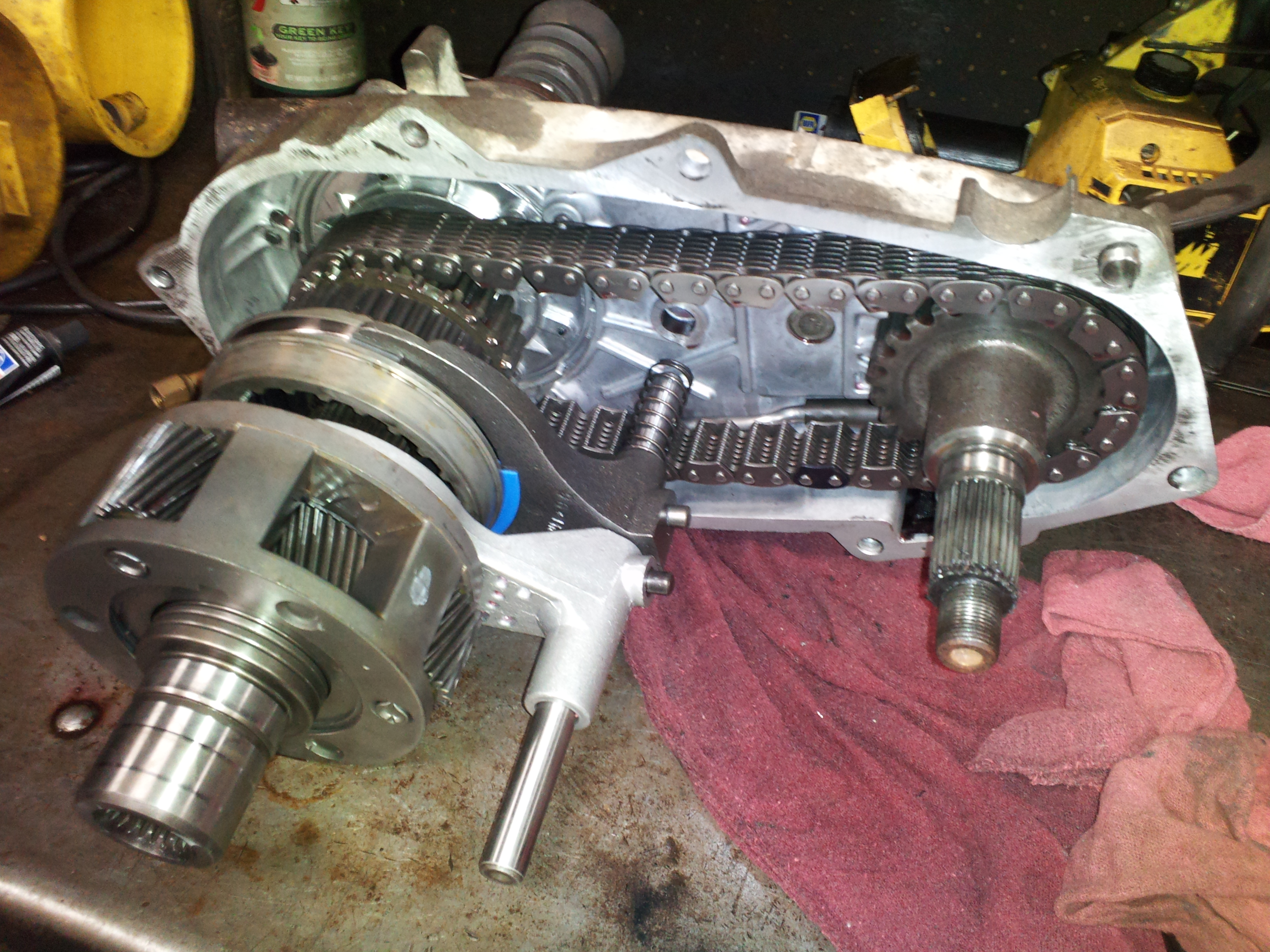
Inside of a 231 New Process Gear transfer case

The Muncie, Indiana, plant under New Venture Gear produced the NV5600, NV4500, NV3500, and NV3550 light truck transmissions.

== Transfer cases ==
The Syracuse New Process Gear plant produced transfer cases for all of the "Big Three"—Ford, Chrysler, and General Motors. The NV247 all-wheel drive transfer case, sold by Chrysler's Jeep division as the "Quadra-Trac II," the manual transaxle for the Dodge Neon and PT Cruiser (T-350), and manual transaxles for European-export Chrysler minivans (T-650 and T-750) were the bulk of the plant's last years of production.

=== Model nomenclature ===
The model numbers of the transfer case consists of the manufacturer, the number of speeds/gears, the strength (1–7), and a number from 1–9 describing the type. The following table delineates the format:

| Manufacturer | Number of speeds/gears | Strength | Type |
|---|---|---|---|
| NP = New Process Gear; NV = New Venture Gear | 1 = One speed (high range); 2 = Two speed (high and low range) | 1 (low) to 7 (high) | 1 = Part-time 4WD; 2 = Full-time 4WD; 3 = Electronic shift 4 = Not used 5 = Torsen-type differential 6 = Computer-controlled multi-plate wet clutch 7 = GeroDisc; 8 = Not used 9 = Viscous coupling |

=== Models ===
| Model | Full-Time High | High Lock | Low range | 2WD | Differential |
|---|---|---|---|---|---|
| 119 | Yes | No | No | No | Yes (Viscous) |
| 125 | Yes | No | No | No | Yes (Open) |
| 126 | Yes | No | No | No | Yes |
| 128 | Yes | No | No | Yes | Yes (Open) |
| 129 | Yes | No | No | Yes | Yes (Viscous) |
| 136 | Yes | | No | | |
| 147 | Yes | | No | No | No (GeroDisc) |
| 149 | Yes | No | No | No | Yes (Viscous) |
| 203 | Yes | Yes | 2.01:1 | No | Yes (Open) |
| 205 | No | Yes | 1.96:1 | Yes | No (Locked) |
| 207 | No | Yes | 2.61:1 | Yes | No (Locked) |
| 208 | No | Yes | 2.61:1 | Yes | No (Locked) |
| 219 | Yes | Yes | Yes | No | Yes (Viscous) |
| 228 | Yes | No | Yes | Yes | Yes (Open) |
| 229 | Yes | No | Yes | Yes | Yes (Viscous) |
| 231 | No | Yes | 2.72:1 | Yes | No (Locked) |
| 233 | No | Yes | 2.72:1 | Yes | |
| 236 | Yes | Yes | 2.72:1 | Yes | |
| 241 | No | Yes | 2.72:1 | Yes | No (Locked) |
| 241OR | No | Yes | 4.0:1 | Yes | No (Locked) |
| 242 | Yes | Yes | 2.72:1 | Yes | Yes (Open) |
| 243 | Yes | No | | Yes | |
| 244 | Yes | Yes | 2.72:1 | No | Yes (Open) |
| 245 | Yes | No | 2.72:1 | No | Yes (Clutch) |
| 246 | Yes | Yes | 2.72:1 | Yes | |
| 247 | Yes | No | 2.72:1 | No | No (GeroDisc) |
| 249 | Yes | No (Pre 96), Yes (96+) | 2.72:1 | No | Yes (Viscous) |
| 261 | No | Yes | 2.72:1 | Yes | No (Locked) |
| 263 | No | Yes | 2.72:1 | Yes | |
| 271 | No | Yes | 2.72:1 | Yes | No (Locked) |
| 273 | No | Yes | 2.72:1 | Yes | No (Locked) |
