= Jeep Cherokee (XJ) =

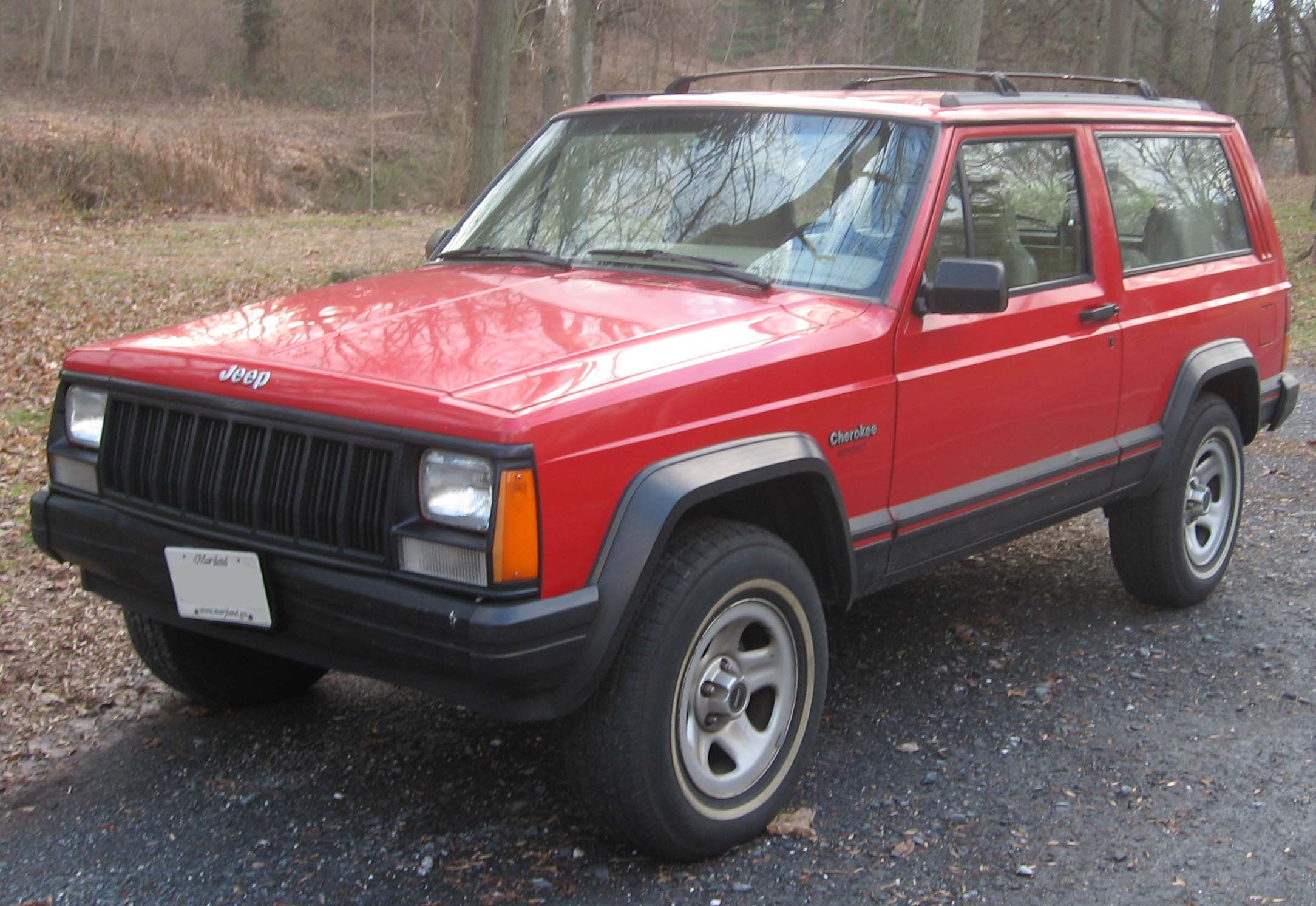
- 1984–1996 Jeep Cherokee 2-door

Overview
- Manufacturer: American Motors (1983–1987); Chrysler Corporation (1987–1998); DaimlerChrysler (1998–2001)
- Also called: Jeep Wagoneer Limited (1984–1990); Renault Jeep Cherokee; Renault Cherokee; In China: Jeep 2500/2700; Beijing BJ2021/BJ7250; BAW Qishi; Shuanghuan SHZJ213
- Production: U.S.: 1983–June 2001; China: 1984–2005 (Beijing Jeep); 1994–1997 (Shuanghuan); 2005–2014 (BAW); South America; Venezuela: 1987–2001; Argentina: 1996–2000; Egypt: 1992–2001
- Model years: U.S.: 1984–2001
- Assembly: United States: Toledo, Ohio (Toledo Complex); China: Beijing (Beijing Jeep and BAW), Shijiazhuang (Shuanghuan Auto); Venezuela: Valencia; Argentina: Ferreyra, Córdoba; Indonesia: Pademangan, North Jakarta (PT. ISMAC); Egypt: Cairo (Arab American Vehicles)
- Designer: Dick Teague

Body and chassis
- Class: Compact SUV (Cherokee); Compact luxury SUV (Wagoneer Limited)
- Body style: 2-door SUV; 4-door SUV
- Layout: Front-engine, rear-wheel drive / Four-wheel drive
- Related: Jeep Comanche; Jeep Grand Cherokee; Jeep Wrangler; Jeep 2500; BAW Qishi

Powertrain
- Engine: gasoline: 2.5 L (150 cu in) AMC I4; 2.8 L (173 cu in) GM LR2 V6; 4.0 L (242 cu in) AMC/PowerTech I6; diesel: 2.1 L (126 cu in) Renault J8S TD I4; 2.5 L (153 cu in) VM Motori 425 OHV TD I4; China (gasoline); 2.0 L Geely 4G20 I4 (BAW Qishi); 2.4 L 4G64 I4 (Beijing Jeep 2500); 2.4 L Geely 4G22 I4 (BAW Qishi); 2.5 L C498QA I4 (Beijing BJ2021/BJ7250/2500); 2.7 L C498QA3 I4 (Beijing Jeep 2700)
- Transmission: 4-speed Aisin AX-4 manual; 5-speed Aisin AX-5 manual; 5-speed Peugeot BA-10/5 manual; 5-speed Aisin AX-15 manual; 5-speed NVG NV3550 manual; 3-speed Chrysler A904 automatic; 3-speed 30RH automatic; 4-speed Aisin AW-4 automatic

Dimensions
- Wheelbase: 101.4 in (2,576 mm); 98.4 in (2,499 mm) (Beijing BJ2021/7250)
- Length: 1987–1990: 165.3 in (4,199 mm); 1991–1993: 168.8 in (4,288 mm); 1994–1996: 166.9 in (4,239 mm); 1997–2001: 167.5 in (4,254 mm); Jeep BJ2021/7250: 168.9 in (4,290 mm); Jeep 2500/2700/BAW Qishi: 169.2 in (4,298 mm)
- Width: 1987–1993, BAW Qishi: 70.5 in (1,791 mm); 1994–1996: 67.7 in (1,720 mm); 1997–1999: 67.9 in (1,725 mm); 2000–2001: 69.4 in (1,763 mm); Jeep BJ2021/7250: 70.9 in (1,801 mm); Jeep 2500/2700: 70.6 in (1,793 mm)
- Height: 1987–1988 2WD: 63.4 in (1,610 mm); 1987–1993: 63.3 in (1,608 mm); 1994–1999 2WD: 63.9 in (1,623 mm); 1994–2001 4WD: 64.0 in (1,626 mm); 2000–2001 2WD: 63.8 in (1,621 mm); Jeep BJ2021/7250: 63.8 in (1,621 mm); Jeep 2500/2700 and BAW Qishi: 66.9 in (1,699 mm)
- Curb weight: 3,357 lb (1,523 kg) (approx.); 1,375–1,662 kg (3,031–3,664 lb) (Jeep 2500/2700); 1,610 kg (3,549 lb) (BAW Qishi)

Chronology
- Predecessor: Jeep Cherokee (SJ) (Cherokee); Jeep Wagoneer (SJ) (Wagoneer)
- Successor: Jeep Liberty (KJ) (Cherokee); Jeep Grand Wagoneer Limited (ZJ) (Wagoneer Limited)

The Jeep Cherokee (XJ) is a sport utility vehicle developed by American Motors Corporation (AMC) and marketed across a single generation by Jeep in the United States from 1983 (model year 1984) through 2001, and globally through 2014. It was available in two- or four-door, five-passenger, front-engine, rear- or four-wheel drive configurations.

Sharing the name of the original, full-size Cherokee SJ model, the 1984 XJ Cherokee was Jeep's first all-new design since the 1963 SJ Wagoneer, as well as the first American off-road vehicle built with fully integrated body-and-frame (unibody) design, and formed the mechanical basis for the Jeep Comanche (MJ) pickup truck (1986–1992).

Jeep marketed XJs as Sportwagons, a precursor to the modern sport utility vehicle (SUV) before that term was used. The XJ is credited for spawning competitors, as other automakers noticed the design cannibalizing sales from regular cars, supplanting the role of the station wagon and transforming the vehicle type "from truck to limousine in the eyes of countless suburban owners," though GM had also launched road-biased, RWD and 4WD compact SUVs, the Chevrolet S-10 Blazer and GMC S-15 Jimmy, one year earlier, initially available in two-door form only.

The 2007 book Jeep Off-Road called the XJ a "significant link in the evolution of the 4x4." In 2011, Kiplinger magazine selected the XJ as one of the "cars that refuse to die." Automotive journalist Robert Cumberford, writing for Automobile, called the Jeep XJ one of the 20 greatest cars of all time — for its design, and "possibly the best SUV shape of all time, it is the paradigmatic model to which other designers have since aspired."

== Background ==
Initial designs for the revolutionary Cherokee XJ emerged in the late 1970s at American Motors, driven by the need to replace the then-current full-size SJ Cherokee with a more compact offering. This strategic move was underscored by reports indicating similar downsizing plans from General Motors (GM) and Ford for their utility vehicles. The 1979 acquisition of a 22% stake in AMC by Renault further shaped the XJ's direction, with the French automaker advocating for not only a smaller footprint but also reduced weight, improved fuel efficiency, and enhanced ergonomics.

The early styling proposals for the XJ Cherokee displayed a distinct European influence, conceived mainly by AMC engineers under the guidance of design vice president Dick Teague. The styling was one of many steps AMC took that moved the Cherokee XJ "into new territory and several would become industry benchmark". Recognizing the potential of this new segment, American Motors invested $250 million in the XJ's design and production, a key element of their strategy asserting that "the compact SUV was 'the future' for automobiles in the United States."

Observing General Motors' development of a new two-door S-10-based Blazer, AMC engineered an entirely new four-door model alongside a two-door variant. This forward-thinking approach was complemented by American Motors' vice president of engineering, Roy Lunn, who created the innovative "Quadra-Link" suspension system specifically designed to mitigate the risk of vehicle rollover. Renault's François Castaing contributed to the XJ's groundbreaking design by developing a drivetrain that utilized a significantly smaller engine than typically found in 4WD vehicles while achieving substantial weight reduction in the new model.

The Cherokee XJ "is noteworthy as the first nonmilitary 4x4 with unibody construction." This unconventional structure enhanced the XJ's durability and off-road prowess, ultimately winning over most critics, even those initially skeptical of models equipped with early, less powerful GM engines. The XJ is also characterized "as the first small crossover SUV in the U.S.," with "plenty of the Jeep toughness (and a straight-six engine) built-in". The innovative design and strategic market positioning of the XJ, alongside the AMC Eagle essentially "foreshadowed the car-based crossover utility-vehicle fad."

The advantages of this new design were immediately apparent: "The new XJ Jeep ... was 1,200 pounds lighter, 31 inches shorter, six inches narrower and four inches lower than the Cherokee SJ it replaced, and yet — thanks to unibody construction — the XJ kept 90 percent of its predecessor’s interior volume." And, not only was fuel economy much improved, but "articulation is also better, as is ground clearance, as well as approach, departure and breakover angles. These, along with its smaller profile, make the XJ better both off-road and on."

Despite the recent introduction of the XJ models, AMC, facing competition from much larger rivals, proactively began developing its successor. To accelerate its product development cycle, the smallest U.S. automaker pioneered a business process now recognized as product lifecycle management (PLM). By 1985, AMC's development and engineering processes were based on sophisticated computer-aided design (CAD) software systems, with all drawings and documents stored in a centralized database. This pioneering PLM system proved so effective that after Chrysler acquired AMC in 1987, they expanded its implementation throughout their entire enterprise.

The lasting impact of this vehicle has been recognized: "The Jeep Cherokee XJ is often pointed to as the vehicle that started America's modern love affair with the SUV." British TV presenter and motoring expert Quentin Willson described the XJ Jeep as "a real 4x4 icon" and one of the "few truly great cars... which, despite being left behind by newer models, still offer fresh and urgent possibilities. Cars, which become more relevant the older they get."

== 1984–1996 ==
The XJ Cherokee introduced for the 1984 model year was the first Jeep with a ladder-boxed chassis integrated into a single monocoque unit rather than the traditional separate body-on-frame construction. The design was rigid and sturdy with approximately 3,200 welds in a completed body, "yet wonderfully lightweight, [the] Uniframe permitted outstanding performance even with AMC's new 2.5 L (150 cu in) four-cylinder engine."

Both two- and four-door versions of the XJ Cherokee were offered throughout its lifetime, each having the same track and wheelbase measurements. Two-door models, however, received longer doors and front seats that could fold forward to assist in rear passenger entry and exit. This was in addition to extended-length rear windows that did not open, although an optional rear vent window was available on some models.

This version was the first to be sold in Europe. In the early years, however, only a few cars were exported. Notable sales only began in the late eighties or early nineties, depending on the country. In 1988 an import organization was established in Switzerland. In 1989, the Cherokee was launched in France (marketed through Renault), in 1992 in some additional markets, and in 1993 for the United Kingdom. Early versions came with the 4.0 L (242 cu in) inline six-cylinder engine. European Cherokee XJ models introduced the 2.5 L (150 cu in) petrol and 2.5 L (153 cu in) VM Motori turbodiesel engines in 1995, expanding powertrain options beyond the earlier 2.1 L diesel.

In mid-1985, a two-wheel-drive version of the Cherokee was added to the lineup. This marked the first time any Jeep product was offered with two-wheel drive since 1967, and was done to attract buyers who did not need (or want to pay for) four-wheel drive. When the XJ Cherokee-based Comanche (MJ) pickup truck was introduced, it was also available in two- and four-wheel drive. The new two-wheel-drive models shared the front suspension (from the track bar, control arms, and ball joints) with four-wheel-drive models. Jeep simply used a single axle tube from hub to hub with no differential between, resulting in an inexpensive front suspension.

For 1996, partially to comply with new U.S. OBD-II exhaust and evaporative emissions regulations, the engine management system was upgraded to Chrysler's then-new "JTEC" PCM. This added the side benefits of improving reliability and easing diagnostics.

American Motors' compact XJ Cherokee was to be replaced by a new and larger model known as the ZJ (later named the Jeep Grand Cherokee when introduced in 1993) that was under development by AMC. However, the smaller model's continuing popularity caused Chrysler executives to rethink this decision, and while the ZJ models were introduced in 1993, the XJ models were retained until 2001. The Jeep XJ has remained a popular choice among off-roading enthusiasts due to its potent off-roading capability in stock form. Its popularity has resulted in strong ongoing aftermarket support in the form of a wide variety of products.

=== Wagoneer ===
A variation on the Cherokee from 1983 until 1990 was the Jeep Wagoneer. These were unrelated to the similarly named full-sized Grand Wagoneer models that had carried the Wagoneer name before this point. The compact XJ Wagoneer was available initially in two trim levels: the "Wagoneer" or "Wagoneer Base" and the "Wagoneer Limited." The "Wagoneer Base" trim was soon discontinued, with its last model year being 1987. Both Wagoneers were distinguished from the Cherokee for the 1983 through 1985 model years by a slightly different grille and a smaller "Jeep" emblem offset to the driver's side. The single rectangular sealed beam headlamps were changed for 1986 to vertically stacked quad low and high beam headlights, with front turn signal lights relocated behind the grille. Where the Cherokee tail lights were split in half with a red section above an amber section, the tail lights on Wagoneers had a single red lens. The Wagoneer Limited came with vinyl wood trim on the sides and cloth seats with leather bolsters. "Limited" was embossed on the front seat backs and in the center of the rear seat back. The standard equipment list was extensive and included air conditioning, cruise control, power disk brakes, rear window wiper and washer, and adjustable steering wheel.

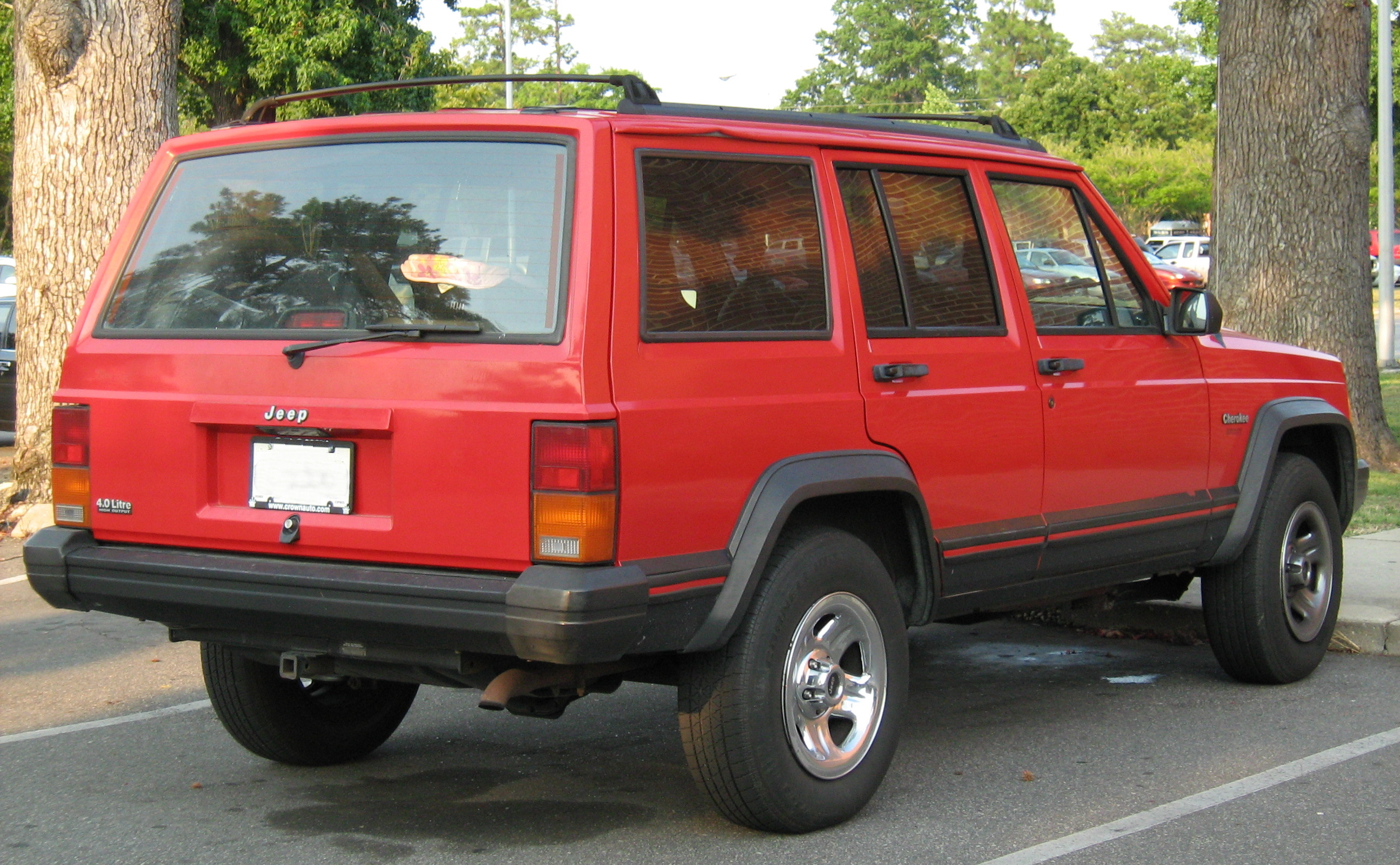
1984–1996 Cherokee Sport 4.0

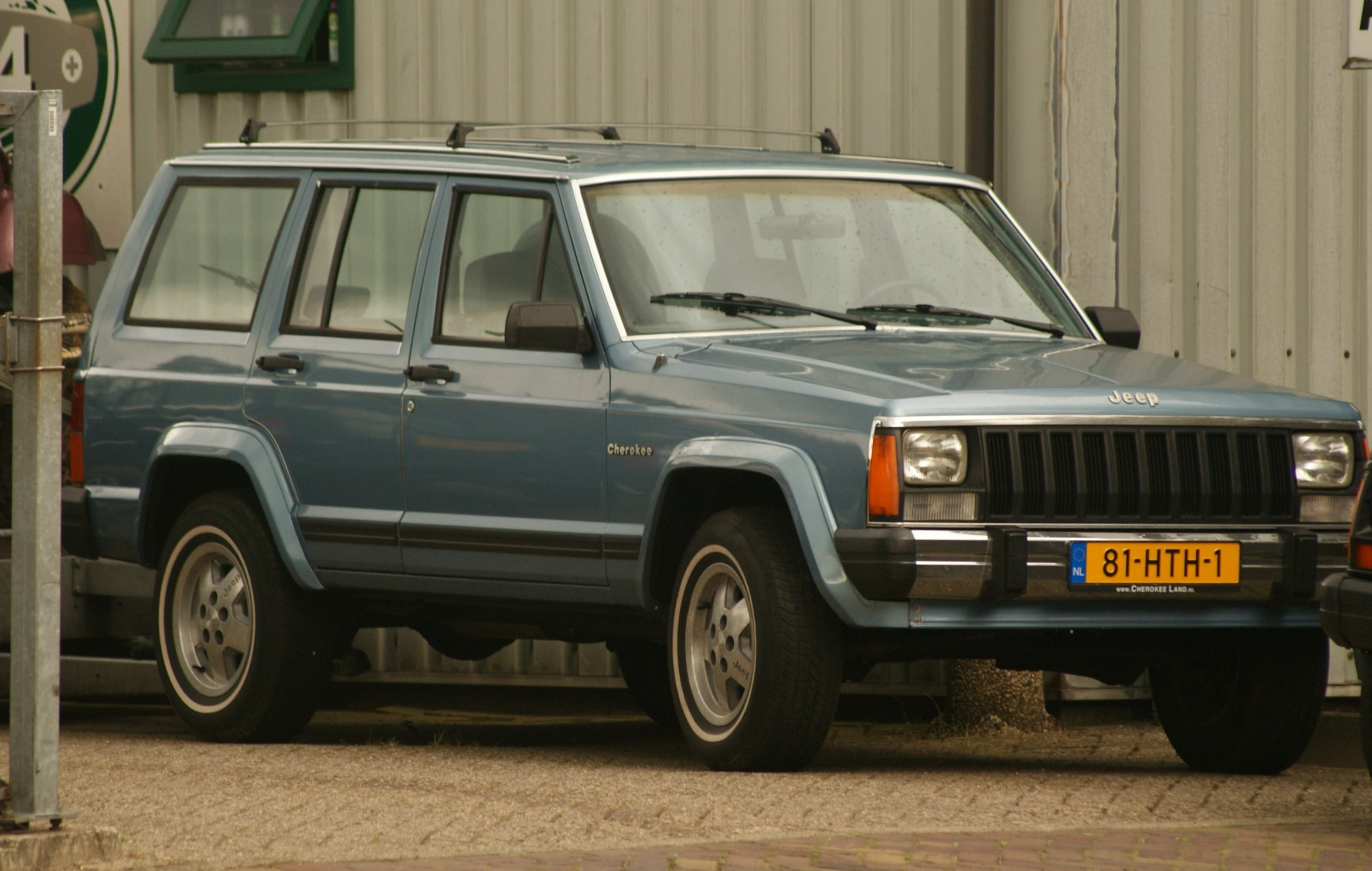
1985 Cherokee (Netherlands)

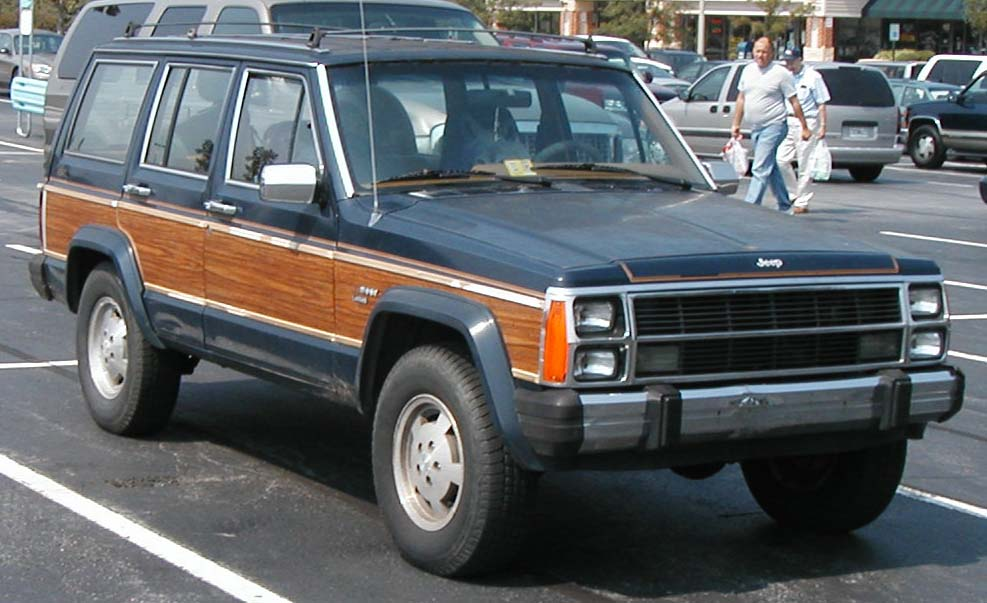
1984–1990 Jeep Wagoneer (XJ)

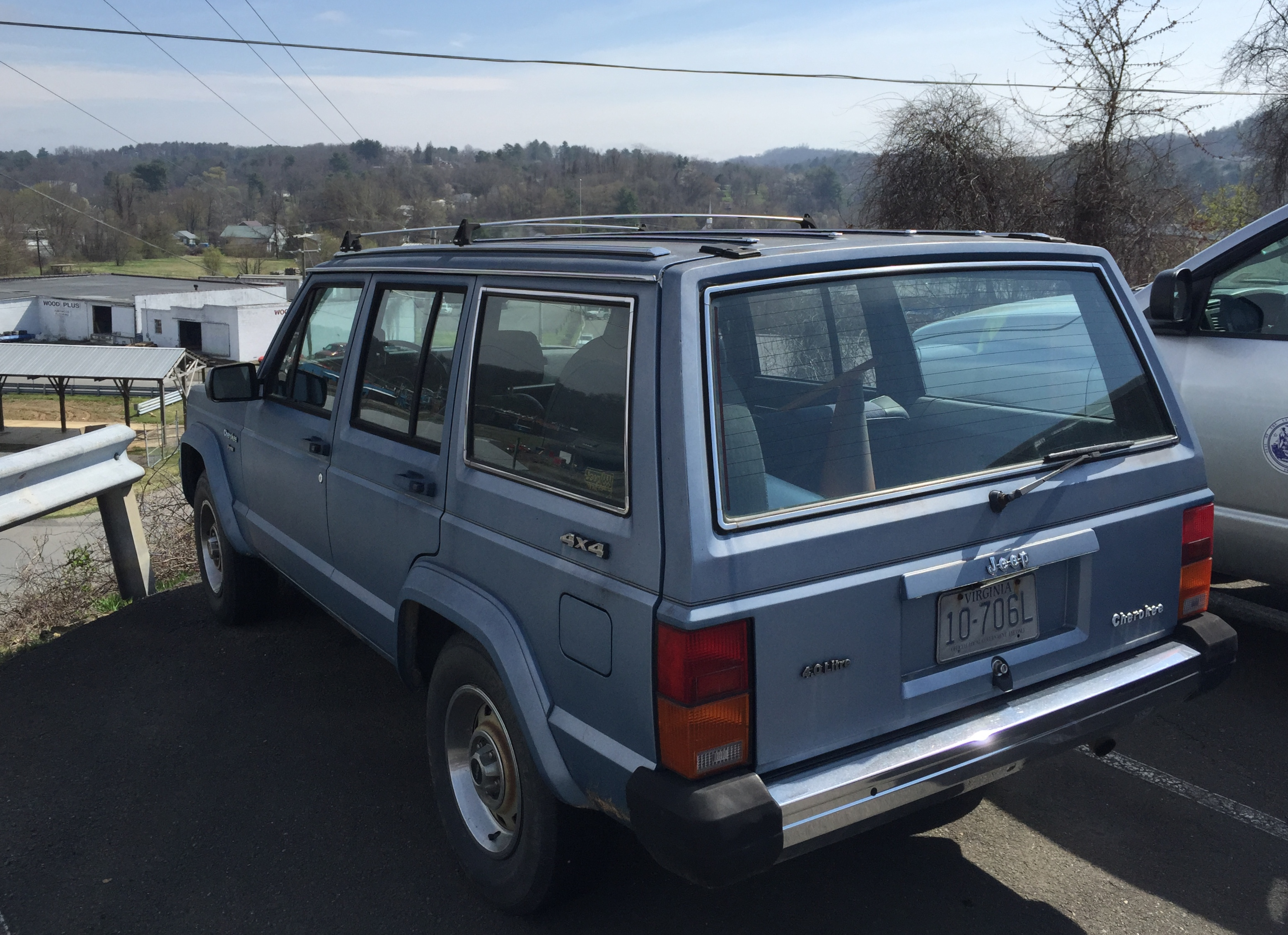
1988 Jeep Cherokee XJ Pioneer Olympic Edition

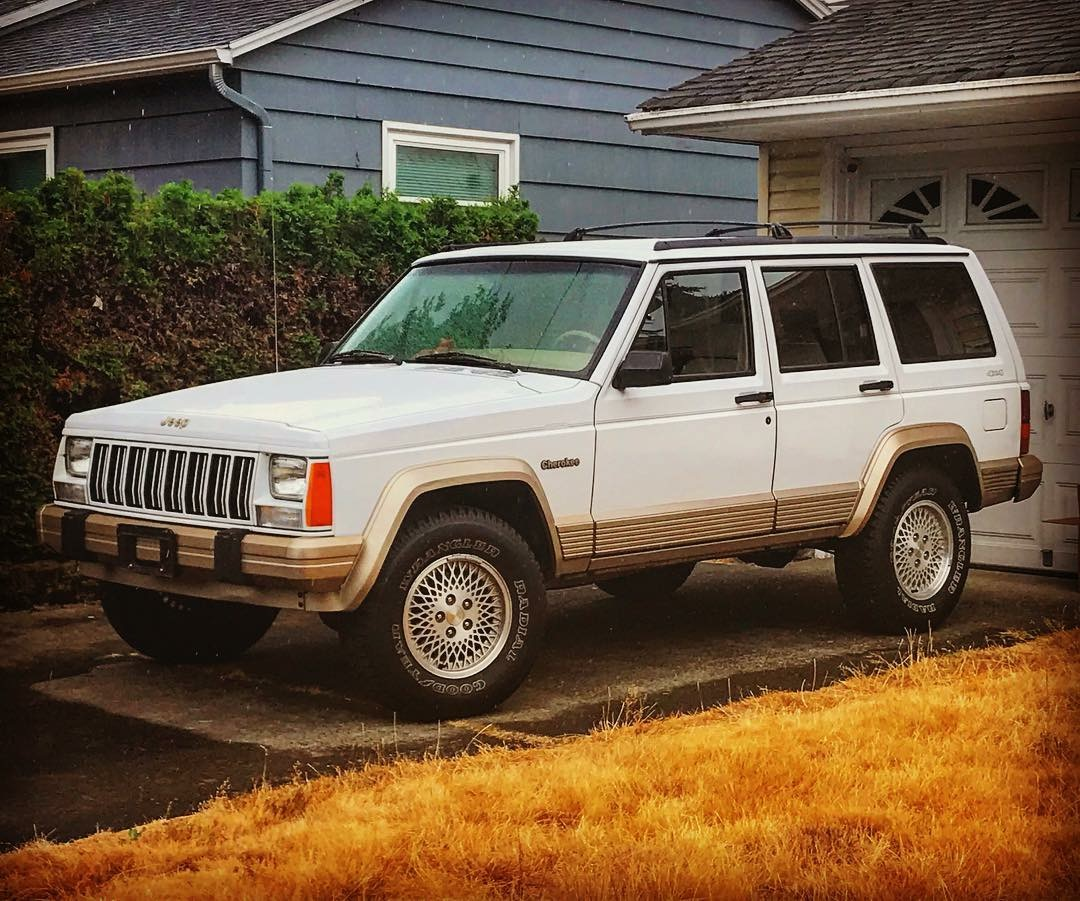
1993–1996 Cherokee Country (USA)

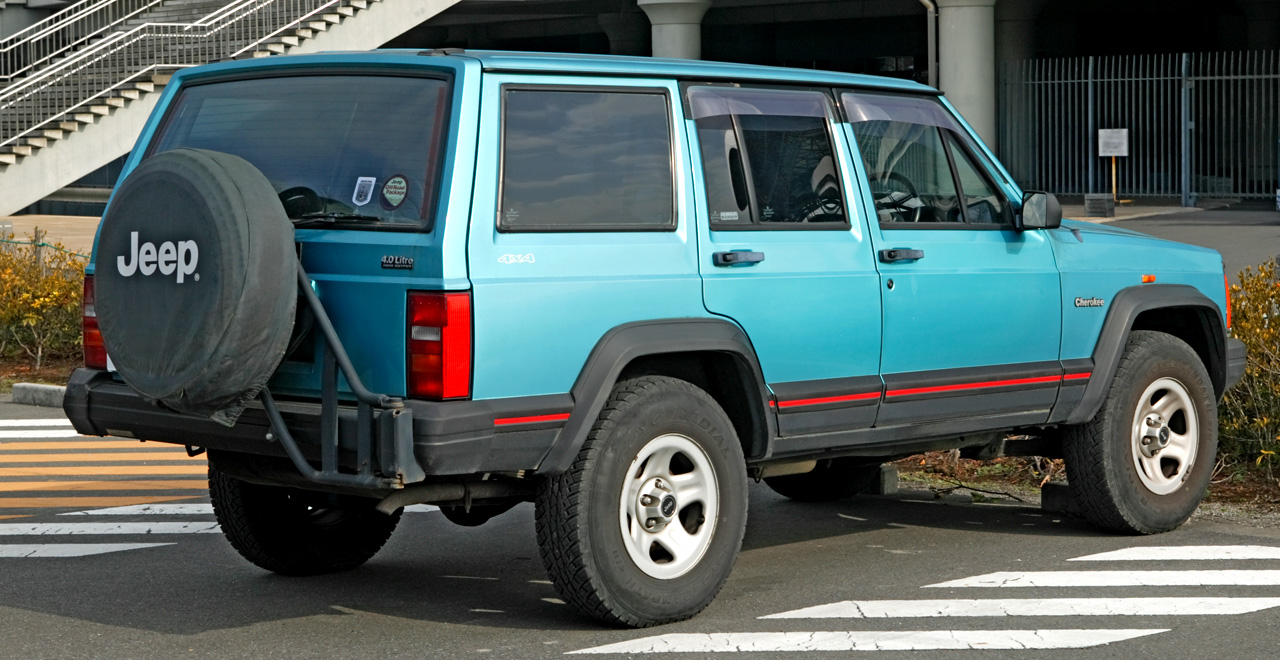
1993–1996 Jeep Cherokee XJ (Japan)

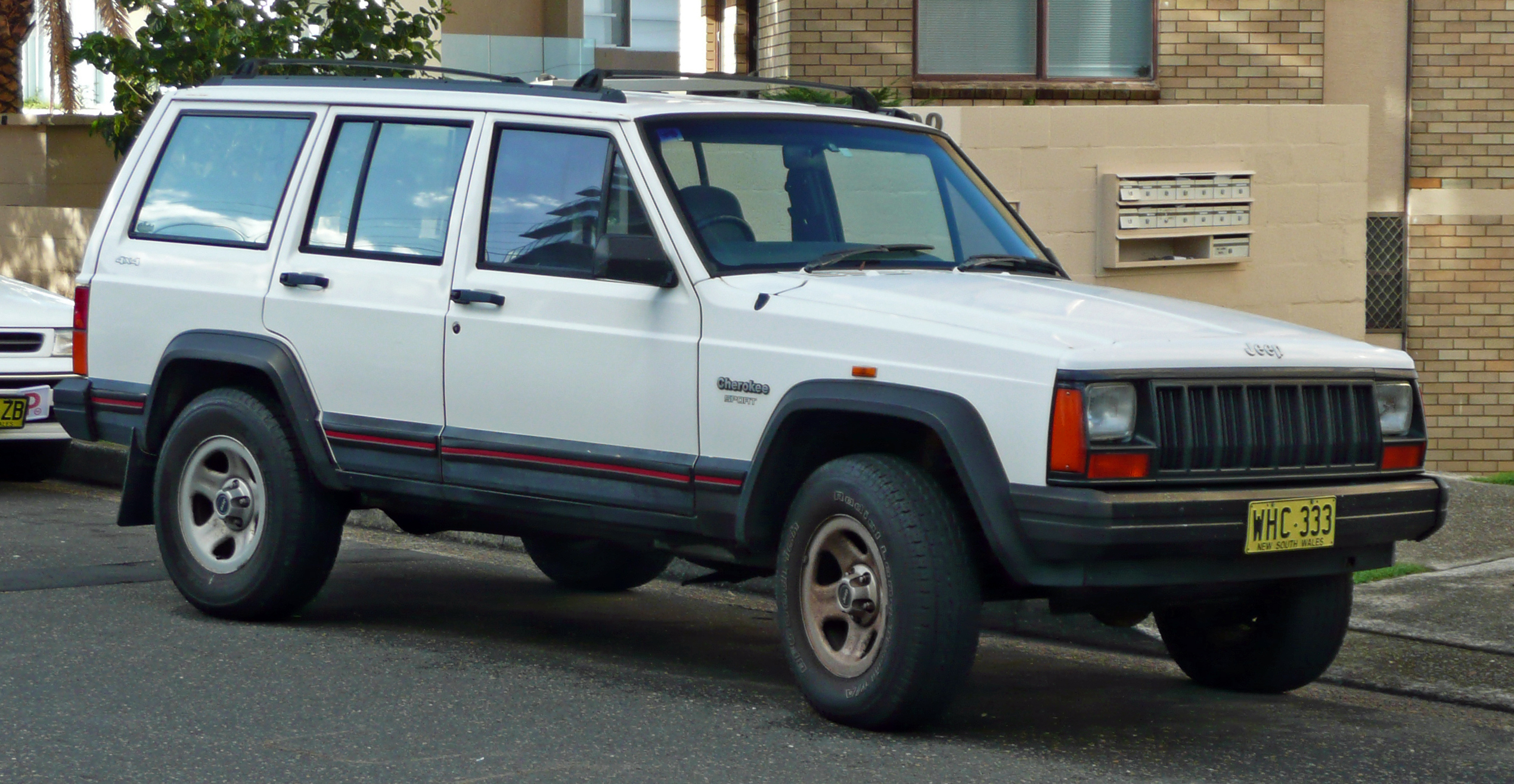
1994–1997 Cherokee Sport, Australia

=== Fleet markets ===
In the early to mid-1990s, the Jeep Cherokee started becoming popular for government and police use. The Cherokee AHB police package was introduced during the 1992 model year. Starting in 1996, Jeep released a special version of the XJ Cherokee SE for police and fleet use. It featured no interior rear door handles and a revised 190 hp (142 kW) high output version of the 4.0 L "Power-Tech" inline six-cylinder engine. The new HO engine replaced the previous 177 hp (132 kW) version of the 4.0 L engine in all installations.

The Cherokee was also made in right-hand drive format, initially for the United States Postal Service. As a spin-off, it allowed Jeep in later years to enter right-hand drive markets — the Cherokee went on sale in both the United Kingdom and Ireland in 1993. It was also sold in Japan, but due to the country's strict "Shaken" motor-vehicle inspection laws, many used Japanese-market Cherokees have found their way back to the U.S. for use by rural mail carriers.

=== Engines ===
Name	Displacement	Layout	Fuel	Power	Torque	Notes	Years
2.5 L AMC 150	2,464 cc (150 cu in)	I4, OHV	Gasoline	105 hp (78 kW) at 5,000 rpm	132 lb⋅ft (179 N⋅m) at 2,800 rpm	Single-barrel carburetor	1984–1985
2.5 L AMC 150	2,464 cc (150 cu in)	I4, OHV	Gasoline	117 hp (87 kW) at 5,000 rpm	135 lb⋅ft (183 N⋅m) at 3,500 rpm	Renix TBI	1986
2.5 L AMC 150	2,464 cc (150 cu in)	I4, OHV	Gasoline	121 hp (90 kW) at 5,250 rpm	141 lb⋅ft (191 N⋅m) at 3,250 rpm	Renix TBI	1987–1990
2.5 L AMC 150	2,464 cc (150 cu in)	I4, OHV	Gasoline	130 hp (97 kW) at 5,250 rpm	149 lb⋅ft (202 N⋅m) at 3,250 rpm	Chrysler MPI	1991–1996
2.8 L V6	2,838 cc (173 cu in)	V6, OHV	Gasoline	110 hp (82 kW) at 4,800 rpm	145 lb⋅ft (197 N⋅m) at 2,100 rpm	Chevrolet LR2	1984
2.8 L V6	2,838 cc (173 cu in)	V6, OHV	Gasoline	115 hp (86 kW) at 4,800 rpm	150 lb⋅ft (203 N⋅m) at 2,400 rpm	Chevrolet LR2	1985–1986
2.1 L TurboDiesel; Douvrin J8S	2,068 cc (126 cu in)	I4, SOHC	Diesel	85 hp (63 kW) at 3,750 rpm	132 lb⋅ft (179 N⋅m) at 2,750 rpm	Renault J8S	1985–1994 (1985–1987 in North America)
4.0 L AMC 242	3,959 cc (242 cu in)	I6, OHV	Gasoline	173 hp (129 kW) at 4,500 rpm	220 lb⋅ft (298 N⋅m) at 2,500 rpm	Renix MPI	1987
4.0 L AMC 242	3,959 cc (242 cu in)	I6, OHV	Gasoline	177 hp (132 kW) at 4,500 rpm	224 lb⋅ft (304 N⋅m) at 2,500 rpm	Renix MPI	1988–1990
4.0 L AMC 242	3,959 cc (242 cu in)	I6, OHV	Gasoline	190 hp (142 kW) at 4,750 rpm	225 lb⋅ft (305 N⋅m) at 3,950 rpm	Chrysler MPI, high output	1991–2001
2.5 L TurboDiesel; VM 425	2,499 cc (152 cu in)	I4, OHV	Diesel	114 hp (85 kW) at 3,900 rpm	221 lb⋅ft (300 N⋅m) at 2,000 rpm	VM Motori 425 OHV	1994–2001

== 1997–2001 ==
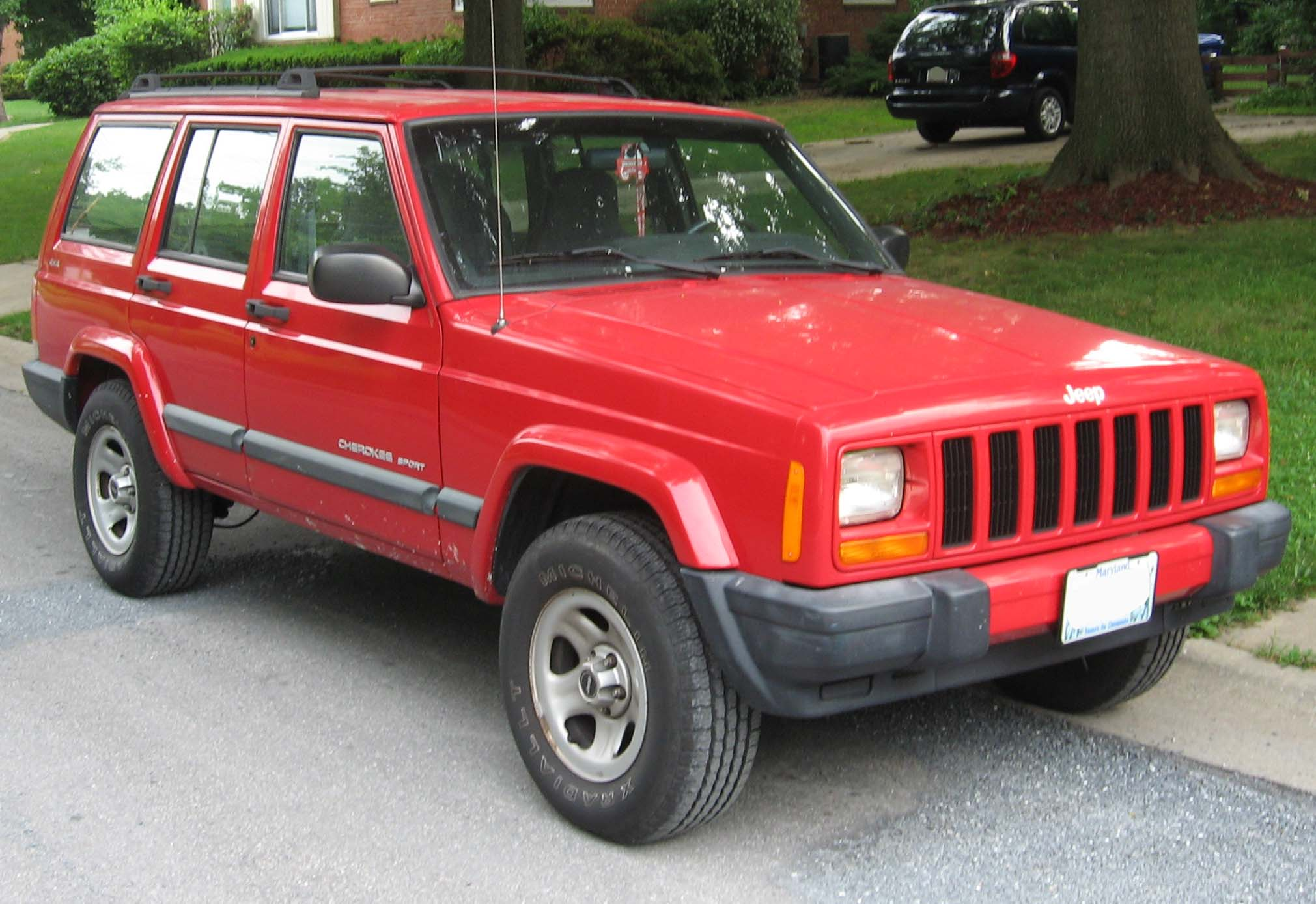
1997–2001 Cherokee Sport 4-door

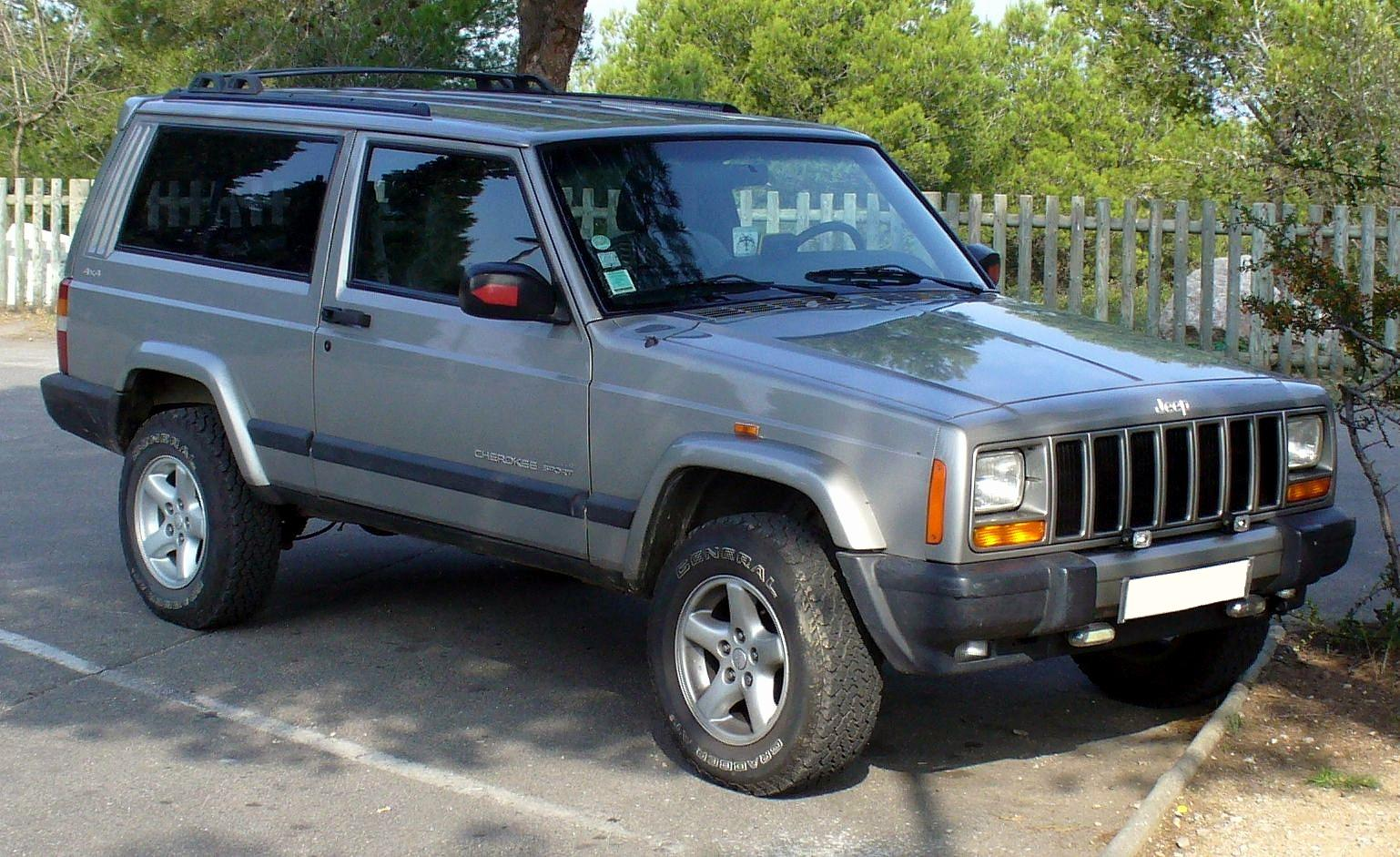
1997–2001 Cherokee Sport 2-door (Germany)

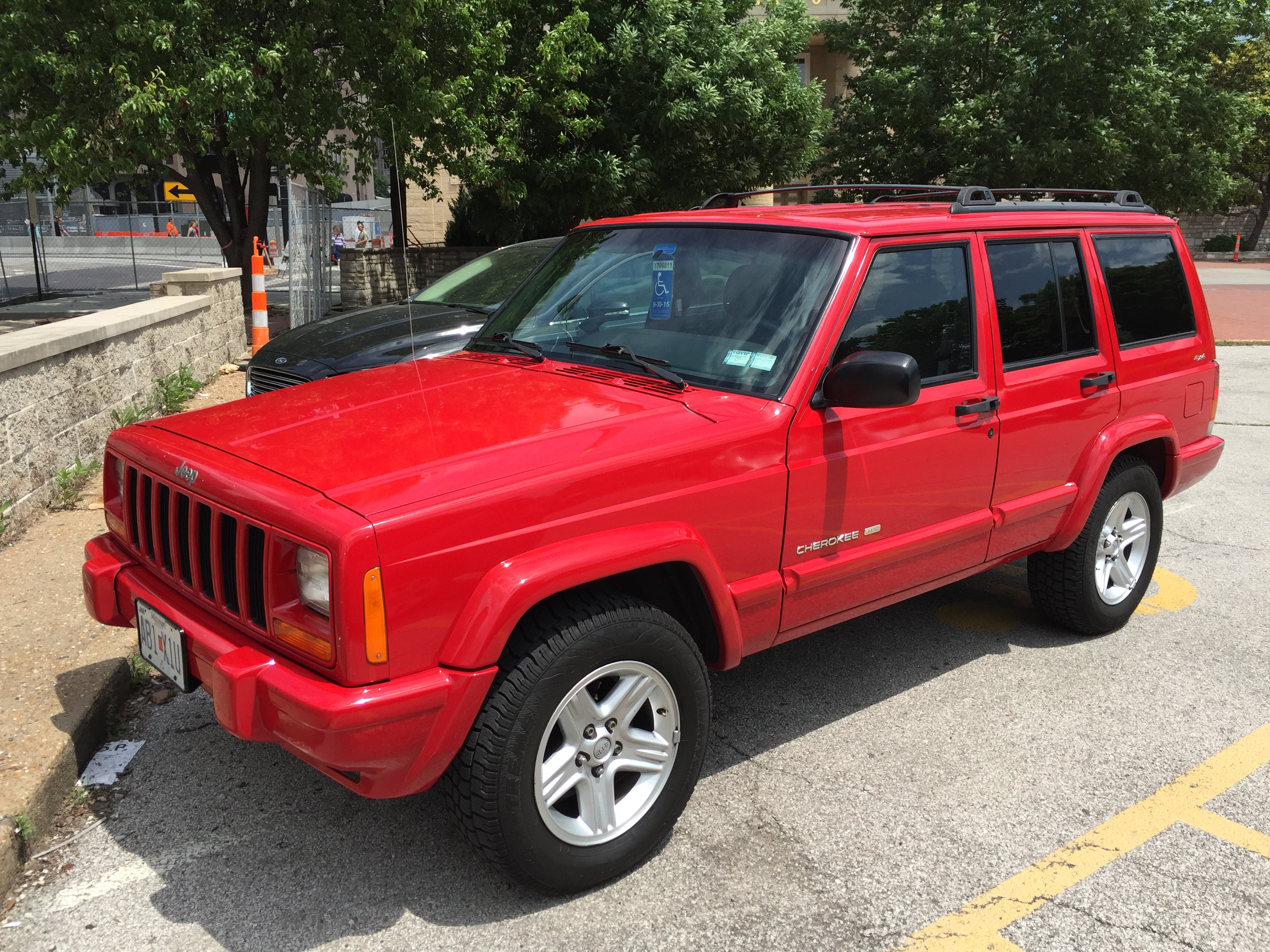
1998–2001 Jeep Cherokee (XJ) Limited

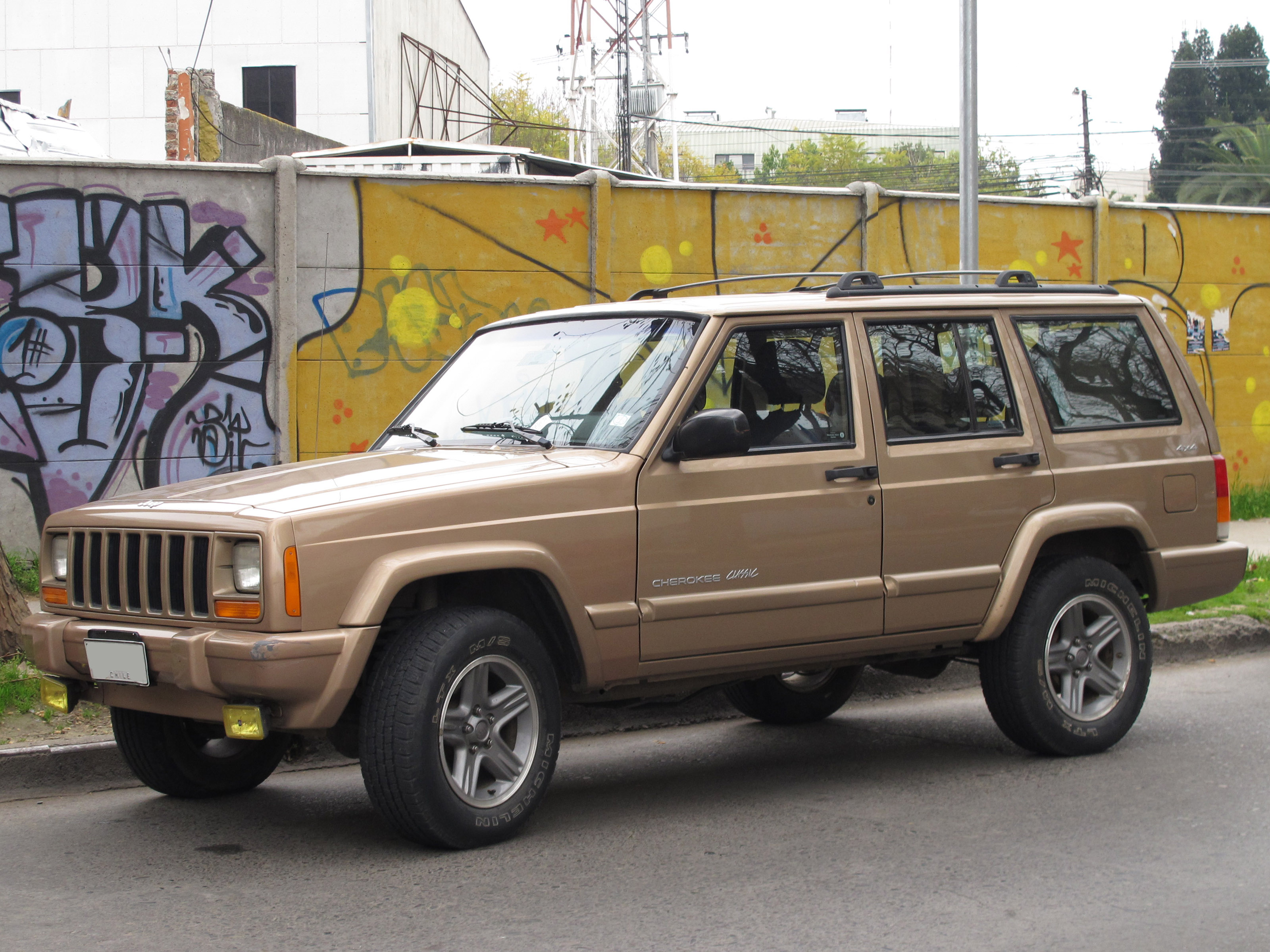
2000 Cherokee 4.0L Classic

After 13 years of production, 1997 saw the Cherokee receive updated exterior and interior styling. Both the two- and four-door bodies remained in production, receiving a steel liftgate (replacing the fiberglass one used previously), restyled taillights, additional plastic molding along the doors, as well as a new front header panel that featured more aerodynamic styling. The spare tire remained mounted to the interior rear quarter panel on the driver's side in the trunk. A new, unique spare tire carrier was invented by Peter Gruich while working for Jeep Special Programs that utilized the trailer hitch bar and a unique pivot bracket, and although it was the only external spare tire carrier to pass the full Jeep durability test, it was not offered for sale.

The interior was similarly updated with an all-new design and instrument panel featuring the first blow-molded symmetrical instrument panel retainer structure. This instrument panel featured a unique cluster/airbag bracket invented by Peter Gruich that allowed the interchange of the two components for the vehicle to be sold in the right-hand and left-hand drive markets with both driver and passenger airbags. A beeper also replaced the buzzer. A stiffer unibody frame brought improvements to noise, vibration, and harshness (NVH) measurements. Also contributing to NVH improvements were new door seals that reduced wind noise at higher speeds.

In the middle of the 1999 model year, vehicles with the 4.0 L engine received a revised intake manifold. This was done to help counteract smaller exhaust porting on the latest casting of cylinder heads, which was done to meet more stringent emissions control laws. Both the four- and six-cylinder engines were offered through the 2000 model year, though only the straight-six was available in 2001. For the 2000 and 2001 model years, all six-cylinder XJs received a distributor-less ignition system using coil-on-plug ignition and wasted spark, replacing the distributor-type system previously used. Coupled with better exhaust porting and the newer intake manifolds, the coil-on-plug gave a minor increase in power and improved emissions performance over the previous models. Transmission, axle, and transfer case choices were carried over from the previous models.

However, major changes were underway with a new executive, Wolfgang Bernhard, who was known as a "cost-slasher" nicknamed "whirlwind", who came from Mercedes-Benz to turn Chrysler around. "One of the first moves Bernhard made when he came to Chrysler in 2000 was to help kill the Jeep Cherokee, an aging, somewhat bland SUV." Thus, the (XJ) Cherokee line was replaced in 2001 by the Jeep Liberty (KJ), which was branded as a "Cherokee" to ride off the success of the XJ in most foreign markets.

The Cherokee (XJ) remains a popular vehicle among off-roading enthusiasts. Its design has been noted as one of the greatest of all time. Popular Mechanics listed the XJ as one of "the 25 greatest boxy cars of all time".

When (XJ) Cherokee production ended in June 2001, the portion of the Toledo South Assembly Plant devoted to its production was torn down.

=== Fleet markets ===
By 1997, the XJ Cherokee became popular in police and government fleets. Production of the Cherokee Special Service Package continued for the 1997 model year into the 2001 model year. It had the same features as the 1996 Cherokee Special Service Package, but the engine now produced 195 hp (145 kW). After the XJ Cherokee production ended in the United States, the Jeep Liberty replacement did not offer a Special Service Package. Although the Jeep Liberty did not have a special service package, police and government agencies used the Liberty in their fleets for light use.

=== Engines ===
Name	Displacement	Layout	Fuel	Power	Torque	Notes	Years
2.5L; AMC 150	2464 cc (150 CID)	I4, OHV	Gasoline	125 hp (93 kW) at 5,400 rpm	150 lb⋅ft (203 N⋅m) at 3,250 rpm	Chrysler MPI	1997–2000
4.0 L AMC 242	3964 cc (242 CID)	I6, OHV	Gasoline	190 hp (142 kW) at 4,600 rpm	225 lb⋅ft (305 N⋅m) at 3,000 rpm	Chrysler MPI, high output	1997–1999
4.0 L AMC 242	3964 cc (242 CID)	I6, OHV	Gasoline	193 hp (144 kW) at 4,600 rpm	231 lb⋅ft (313 N⋅m) at 3,000 rpm	Chrysler MPI, high output	2000–2001
TurboDiesel	2499 cc (153 CID)	I4, OHV	Diesel	114 hp (85 kW) at 3,900 rpm	221 lb⋅ft (300 N⋅m) at 2,000 rpm	VM Motori 425 OHV	1997–2001

== Trim levels ==
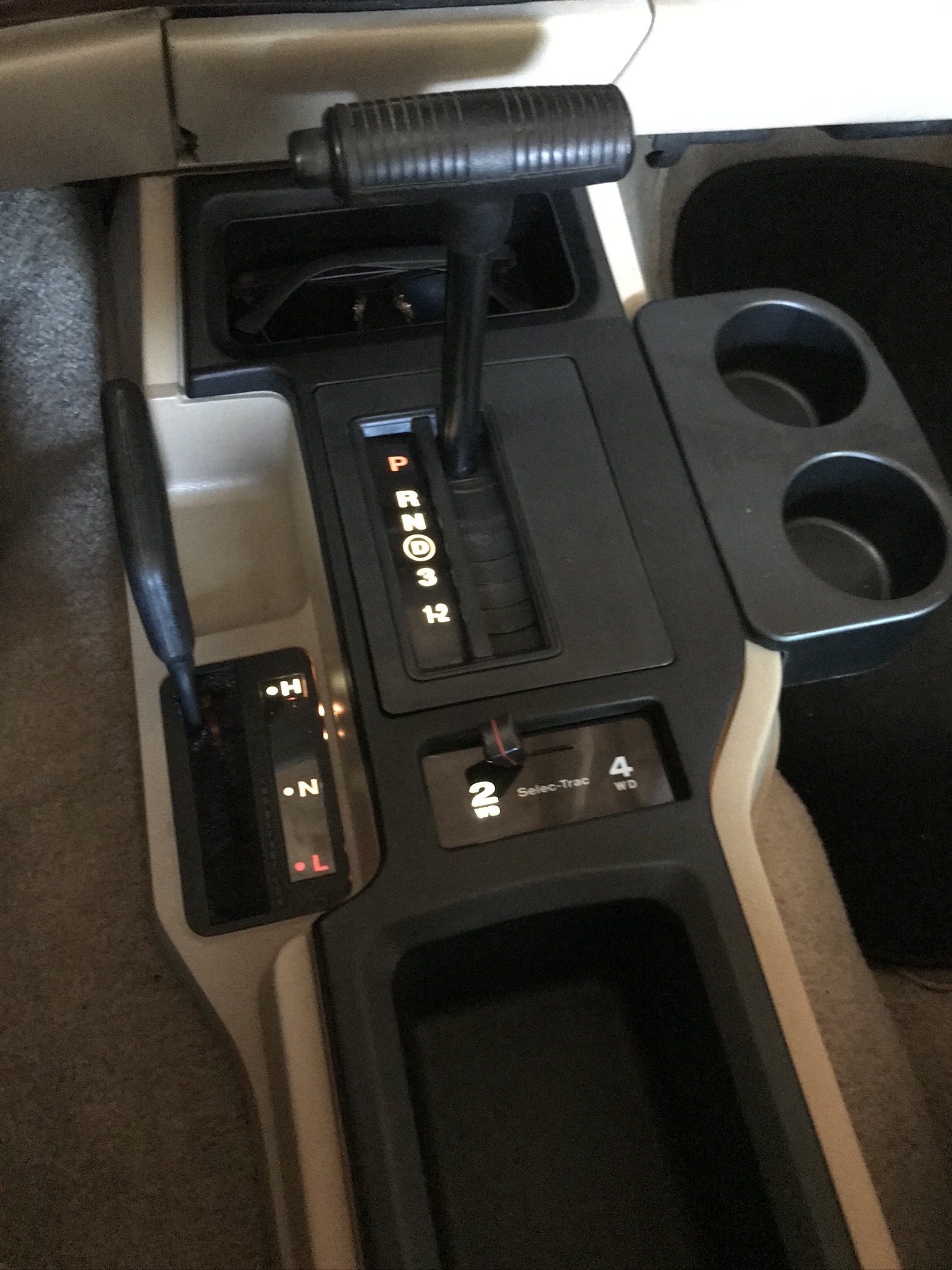
Console controls for the SelecTrac, NP228 transfer case (1984–1986)

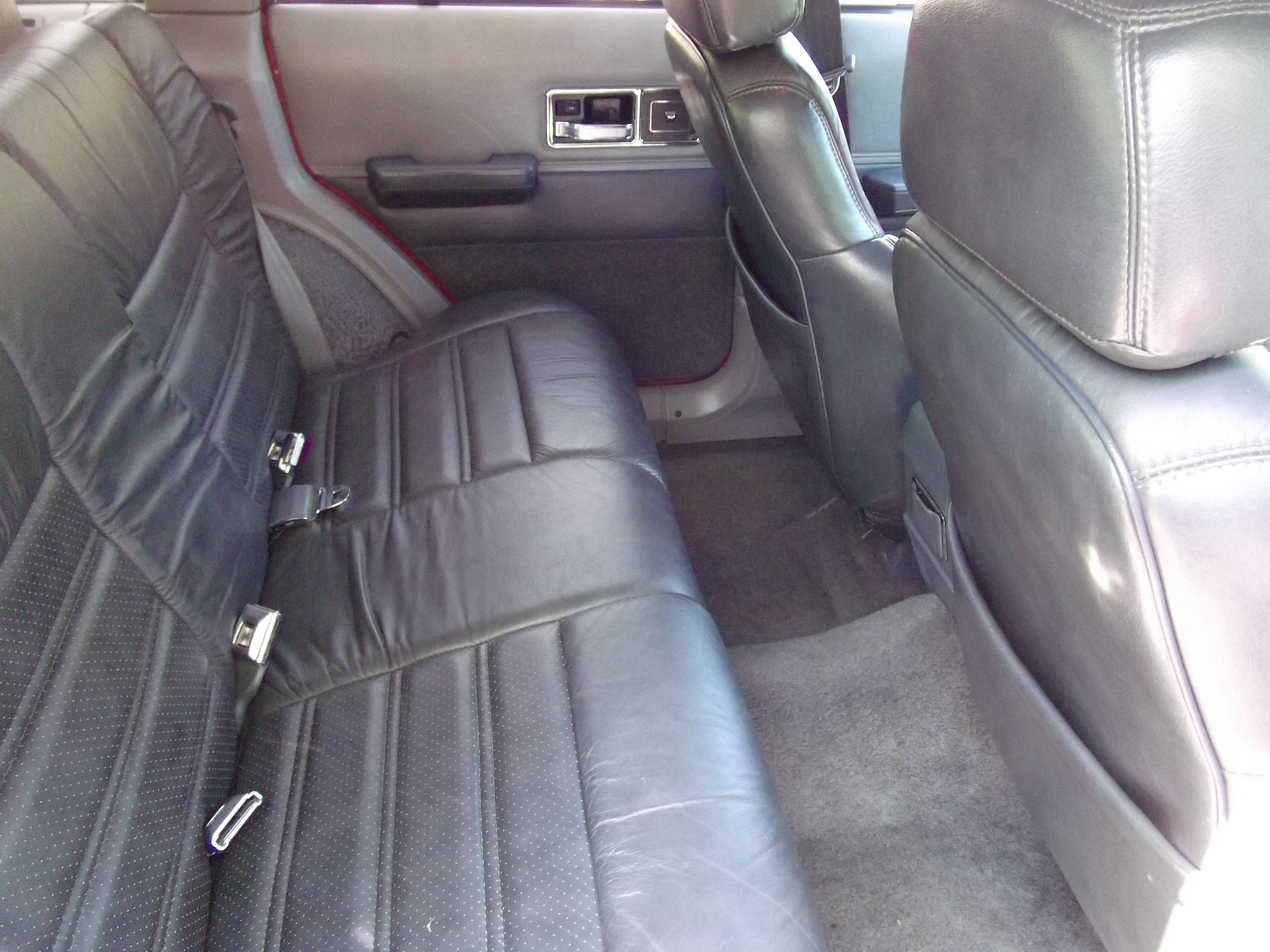
1987–1992 Cherokee Limited rear bench seat, 1992 shown

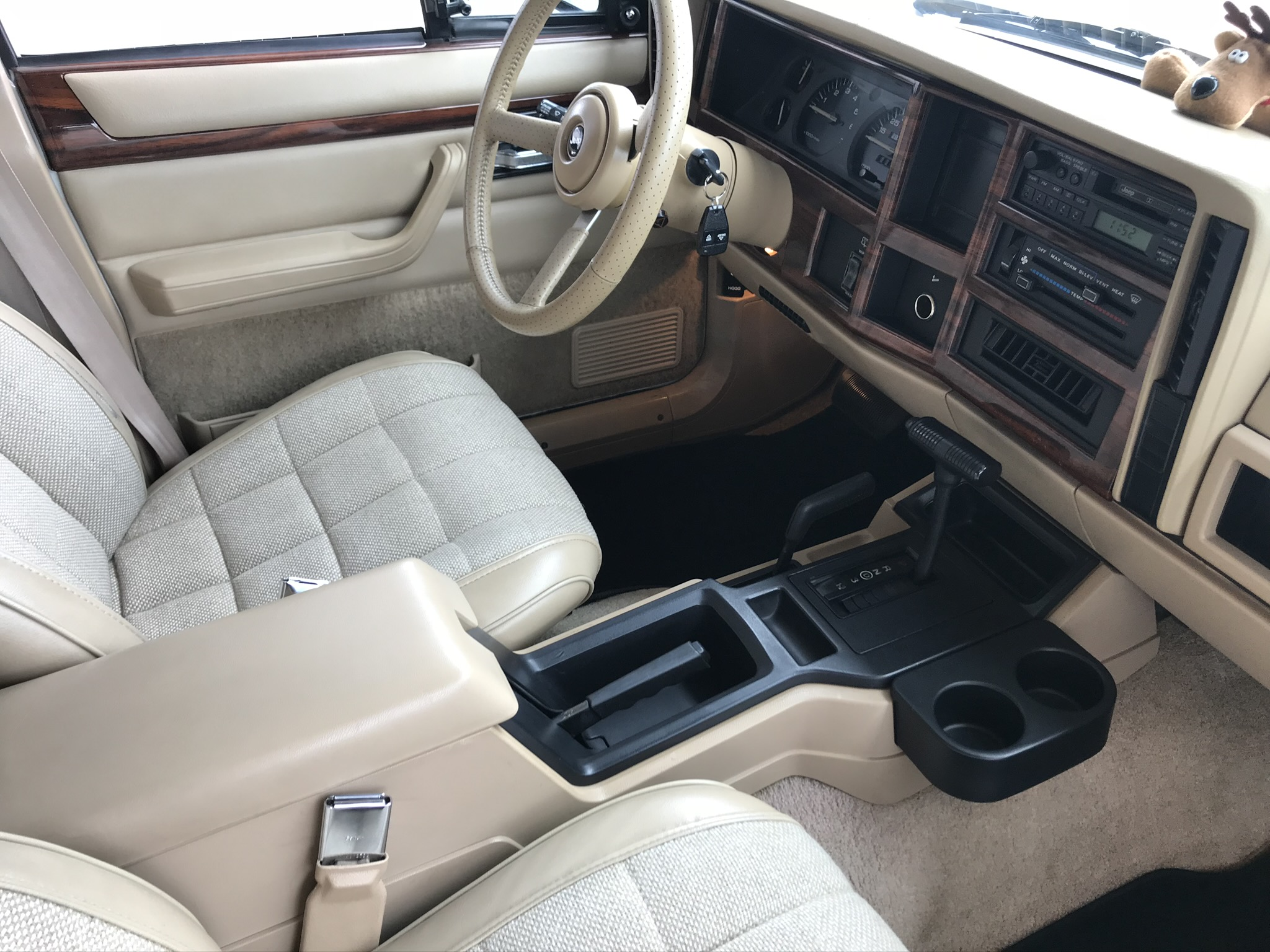
1993 Cherokee Country interior

- Base - 1984–1993 / SE - 1994–2001 included: vinyl or cloth upholstery, full-faced steel wheels, and AM radio with two speakers. SE replaced Base in 1994. In later years, it was the only trim level offered for the two-door model.
- Chief - 1984–1990 included: cloth plaid-pattern upholstery, and AM/FM radio with two speakers.
- Pioneer - 1984–1990 included: cloth plaid-pattern upholstery, steel wheels, and an AM radio with two speakers.
  - Pioneer Olympic Edition - 1988 included: cloth upholstery, AM/FM radio with two speakers, and air conditioning.
- Wagoneer - 1984–1990 included: ribbed cloth upholstery with leather trim, faux maple-wood interior accents with wood laminate exterior decals, alloy wheels, AM/FM radio with cassette player and four speakers, infrared (single-button) remote keyless entry for 1990 model year, overhead console for 1990 model year, dual power seats, and air conditioning. Considered by AMC to be a separate model and not part of the Cherokee series.
- Laredo - 1985–1992 included: chrome accenting, cloth plaid-pattern (1985 through 1987) or "luggage fabric" (1988 through 1992) upholstery with the option of "Briarwood" style leather-and-vinyl seats for the 1992 model year only, five-spoke alloy wheels, AM/FM radio with four speakers and the option for six Jensen AccuSound speakers, infrared (single-button) remote keyless entry (if equipped with power locks) optional overhead console, optional dual power seats, and air conditioning. Replaced by the Country in 1993.
- Limited - 1987–1992, 1998–2001 included: monotone paint, leather-and-vinyl upholstery, color-keyed lace-spoke wheels, AM/FM radio with cassette player and six Jensen AccuSound speakers, infrared (single-button) remote keyless entry, an overhead console, dual power seats, and air conditioning. This trim model was replaced by the Country in 1993 and then rejoined the lineup in 1998 to replace the Country.
- Sport - 1988–2001 included: cloth-and-vinyl upholstery, AM/FM radio with two speakers (later, it added a cassette player and four speakers), full-faced steel or optional alloy wheels, optional infrared (single-button) (1988 through 1996) or radiofrequency (dual-button) (1997 through 2001) keyless entry (if equipped with power locks), and air conditioning.
- Briarwood - 1991–1992 (succeeded Wagoneer) included: leather-and-vinyl upholstery, faux maple-wood interior accents with wood laminate exterior decals, lace-spoke wheels, AM/FM radio with cassette player and six Jensen AccuSound speakers, infrared (single-button) remote keyless entry, an overhead console, dual power seats, and an air conditioner.
- Country - 1993–1997 included: two-tone paint similar to "Laredo" with upgraded color-keyed pinstripe and the option for "champagne" gold along with silver as accent options, several formerly chrome interior accents replaced with flat black (as on Base and Sport models starting in the 1993 model year), cloth-and-vinyl ("luggage fabric") upholstery with the option for leather (excluding 1993 model year), faux mahogany-wood interior accents, lace-spoke wheels, AM/FM radio with cassette player and four speakers with the option for six Jensen AccuSound speakers, optional overhead console (excluding 1993 model year), infrared (dual-button) (1993 through 1996) or radiofrequency (dual-button) (1997) remote keyless entry (if equipped with power locks), optional dual power seats, and air conditioning. Replaced by the Classic and Limited in 1998.
- Classic - 1998–2000 included: monotone paint color, cloth upholstery, 16-inch alloy wheels, AM/FM radio with cassette player and four speakers, infrared (dual-button) remote keyless entry, overhead console, and air conditioning. Replaced the Country, along with the Limited, in 1998; dropped after the 2000 model year.
- Orvis - 1999–2000, Limited-production model, only available in the United Kingdom, included: Special Orvis badging, special Orvis floor mats (with enamel logos stitched into them), 16-inch 'Icon' alloy wheels with two-tone color scheme, simulated hood vents, tailgate spoiler with integrated LED brake light, ruffled leather seats with 6-way electric adjustment, leather door-panels, leather spare wheel cover. The Orvis logo is embossed into each headrest, golden Orvis logo is on top of the ashtray lid. AM/FM radio with cassette, Infinity amplifier and six Infinity speakers, remote keyless entry, cruise control, driver and passenger side heated mirrors, and air conditioning. Available with the 4.0 L (242 cu in) inline-six with the Aisin AW-4 four-speed automatic. Also available was the VM Motori 2.5 L Turbo-Diesel four-cylinder engine with a five-speed manual transmission.
- Freedom - 2000 included: special badging, SE appearance group on sport body, 16-inch Ultrastar alloy wheels (the same as the 1998 5.9L ZJ), AM/FM radio with cassette, radio frequency remote keyless entry, and air conditioning. Based on the Sport trim level. Available in 2wd or 4wd.
- 60th Anniversary - 2001 included: special badges, special floor mats, monotone paint color, 16-inch alloy wheels, AM/FM radio with cassette, radio frequency remote keyless entry, and air conditioning. Based on the Sport trim level.

== Available drivetrain components ==
=== Manual transmissions ===
- 1984: Borg-Warner T-4 four-speed manual, used with 2.5 L I4 only, 21 spline output
- 1984–1987: Aisin-Warner AX4 four-speed manual, used with 2.5 L I4 only, 21 spline output
- 1984: Borg-Warner T-5 five-speed manual, used with 2.5 L I4 and 2.8 L V6, 21 spline output
- 1984–2000: Aisin-Warner AX5 five-speed manual, used with 2.5 L I4, 2.1 L I4 diesel, and 2.8 L V6, 21 spline output
- 1987–Mid-1989: Peugeot BA-10/5 five-speed manual used with 4.0 L I6, 21 spline output
- Late 1989–1999: Aisin-Warner AX15 five-speed manual, used with 2.5 L I4 diesel, 4.0 L I6, 23 spline output
- 2000–2001: New Venture Gear NV3550 five-speed manual, used with 2.5 L I4 diesel, 4.0 L I6, 23 spline output

=== Automatic transmissions ===
- 1984–1986: Chrysler A904 three-speed automatic, used with 2.5 L I4 and 2.8 L V6
- 1987–2001: Aisin-Warner AW-4 four-speed automatic, used with 4.0 L I6
- 1994–2000: Chrysler 30RH three-speed automatic, used with 2.5 L I4

=== Transfer cases ===
All the transfer cases used on the Cherokee were chain-driven two-speed units with aluminum housings. Command-Trac was standard on XJ models built with 4WD.

Model years	Model	Commercial name	Part-time	Full-time	Ratio	Notes
1984–1987	New Process; NP207	Command-Trac	Yes	No	2.61:1	
1984–1986	New Process; NP228/229	Selec-Trac	Yes	Yes	2.61:1	Has a vacuum switch for 2WD-4WD selection on the fly and a separate manual lever for low-range
1987–2001	New Process; NP231	Command-Trac	Yes	No	2.72:1	Gear positions are 2HI, 4HI, N, 4LO
1987–2001	New Process; NP242	Selec-Trac	Yes	Yes	2.72:1	Gear positions are 2HI, 4 full-time, 4 part-time, N, 4LO

=== Axles ===
The Jeep XJ utilizes front and rear beam axle components (live axles) as opposed to an independent suspension. The live axle configuration offers advantages in off-road capability and performance at the expense of some on-road comfort and driveability. Mid-1985 and later two-wheel drive models used the same suspension and steering mechanisms with a single tube connecting axle ends, which also meant no transfer case, no front driveshaft, and no front differential.

==== Front axle ====
- 1984–1996: Dana 30, high pinion, reverse cut, 27-spline axle shafts (1989–1995: with ABS used 5-297x universal joints, non-ABS had 5-260x universal joints. NP228/229 "Selec-Trac" equipped XJ models were also produced with constant-velocity joints instead of universal joints.)
- 1996–1999: Dana 30, high pinion, reverse cut, 297x/760 universal joint, 27-spline axle shafts
- 2000–2001: Dana 30, low pinion, standard cut, 297x/760 universal joint, 27-spline axle shafts
- 1985–2001: straight non-driven front axle for two-wheel drive only

==== Rear axle ====
- 1984–1989: Dana 35, non c-clip, with anti-lock braking system (ABS) or non-ABS; Dana 44 on some models
- 1987–1991: Dana 44, models w/tow package only, 30-spline axle shafts, non-ABS
- 1990–1996: Dana 35, c-clip, ABS or non-ABS
- 1997–2001: Dana 35, c-clip, ABS
- 1991–1996: Chrysler 8.25", c-clip, non-ABS, 27-spline axle shafts
- Late 1996–2001: Chrysler 8.25", c-clip, non-ABS, 29-spline axle shafts

==== Axle gear ratios ====
Jeep XJs came in several standard gearing ratios:

- 3.07:1, manual transmission, I6 engine.
- 3.54:1, automatic transmission, I6 engine with Dana 44 rear differential
- 3.54:1, manual transmission, I4 engine with Dana 35 rear differential
- 3.55:1, automatic transmission, I6 engine; manual transmission, I4 engine
- 3.73:1, automatic transmission, I6, tow package, UpCountry package, 2.5 VM diesel manual
- 4.10:1, 2.5L I4 engine, early models with tow package
- 4.56:1, automatic transmission, I4, off-road or tow package

=== Suspension ===
The Jeep XJ utilizes a coil spring with a separate shock absorber front suspension and a leaf spring with a separate shock absorber rear suspension.

==== Front suspension ====
The Quadra-Link front suspension design locates the axle with four leading control arms to control longitudinal movement and rotation about the lateral axis (drive and braking reaction), two above the axle and two below it. A panhard rod, also referred to as a track bar, is used to locate the axle laterally. Two coil springs are seated on top of the axle housing, as well as two gas-charged shock absorbers. The suspension used on vehicles with the optional UpCountry package provided one inch of lift over the standard suspension. A sway bar is utilized to reduce body roll in turns.

==== Rear suspension ====
The XJ uses a leaf spring rear suspension. Each leaf pack contains four leaf springs with a fixed eye at the front of the spring and a compression-style shackle at the rear of the spring. Two gas-charged shock absorbers are also used, along with a mild anti-sway/anti-roll bar. The suspension used on vehicles with the optional UpCountry package did not include the rear anti-sway/anti-roll bar, but provided a one-inch lift over the standard suspension.

== XJ in Europe ==
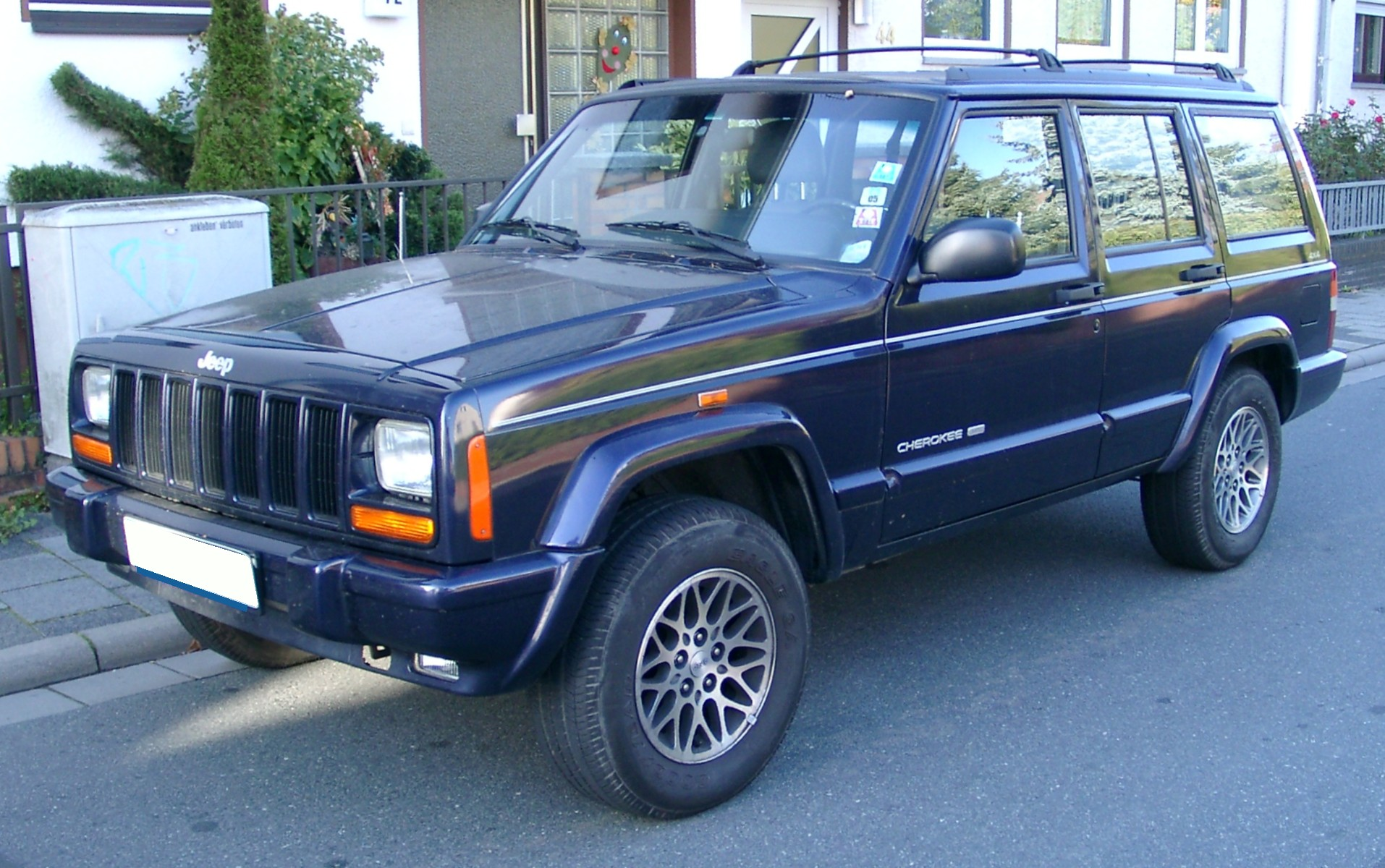
European passenger version Cherokee XJ

The XJ was introduced to left-hand drive European markets in 1985, one year after its American debut. However, the strong U.S. Dollar made the Cherokee expensive and prevented notable sales during the first years. In most countries, import figures only started rising in the late eighties or early nineties. Right-hand drive European markets only began to officially receive Cherokees (in RHD form) in 1993, although a small number of personal imports had been reaching the UK in left-hand drive form for many years before that. Models were offered in both markets until the XJ's discontinuation in 2001, at which point it was replaced by the Jeep Cherokee (KJ), which retained the Cherokee name for sale in Europe despite sharing little mechanical heritage with its predecessor. The Cherokee was often sold in Europe as part of Renault's lineup and was occasionally referred to as the Renault Jeep Cherokee in marketing, although it was never sold with Renault badges. However, motorsports versions of the Cherokee that competed in the Dakar Rally did wear Renault badges.

A van version of the XJ was offered in addition to the standard passenger vehicles in some European markets. Available in both right- and left-hand-drive models, they were designed to comply with relaxed motor tax regulations in some EU member states governing vehicles intended primarily for commercial use. Both two- and four-door versions are known to have been sold, with the main differences from the standard models being metal panels in place of the rear side windows, no rear seats, and a completely flat cargo area. Two- and four-wheel-drive variants were available, powered by the VM Motori 2.5 L diesel engine mated to the Aisin AX-15 manual transmission.

== XJ in China ==
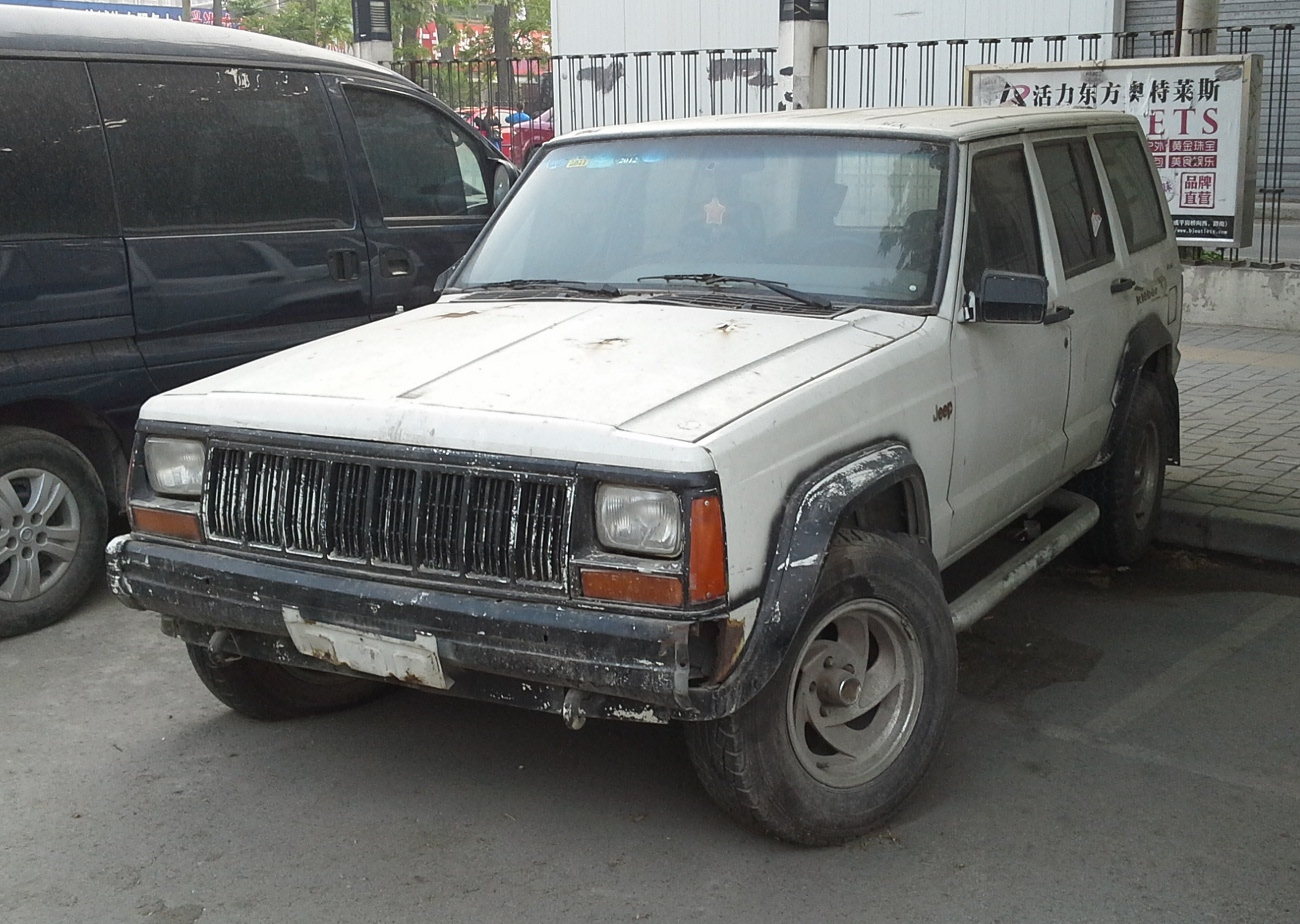
Beijing Jeep BJ2021 Cherokee (original version)

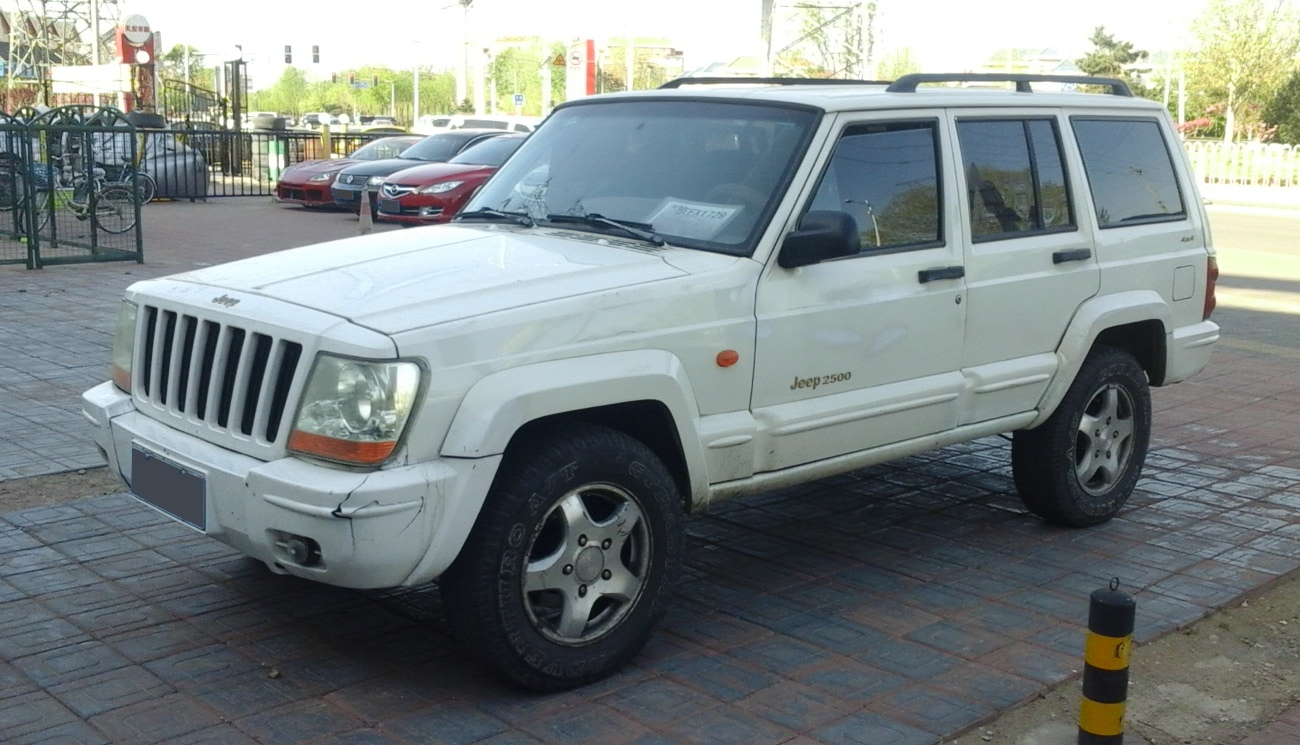
Beijing Jeep BJ2500（MY2004–2005）

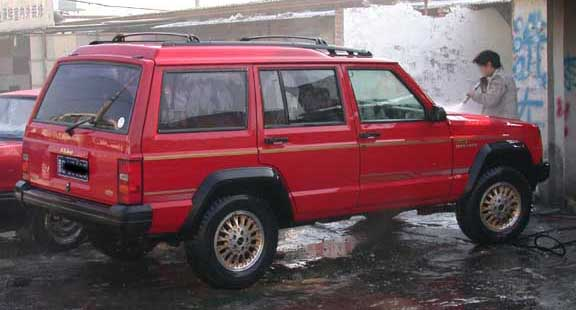
Beijing BJ2021, a Jeep XJ with a raised roof and longer wheelbase (1984–2005)

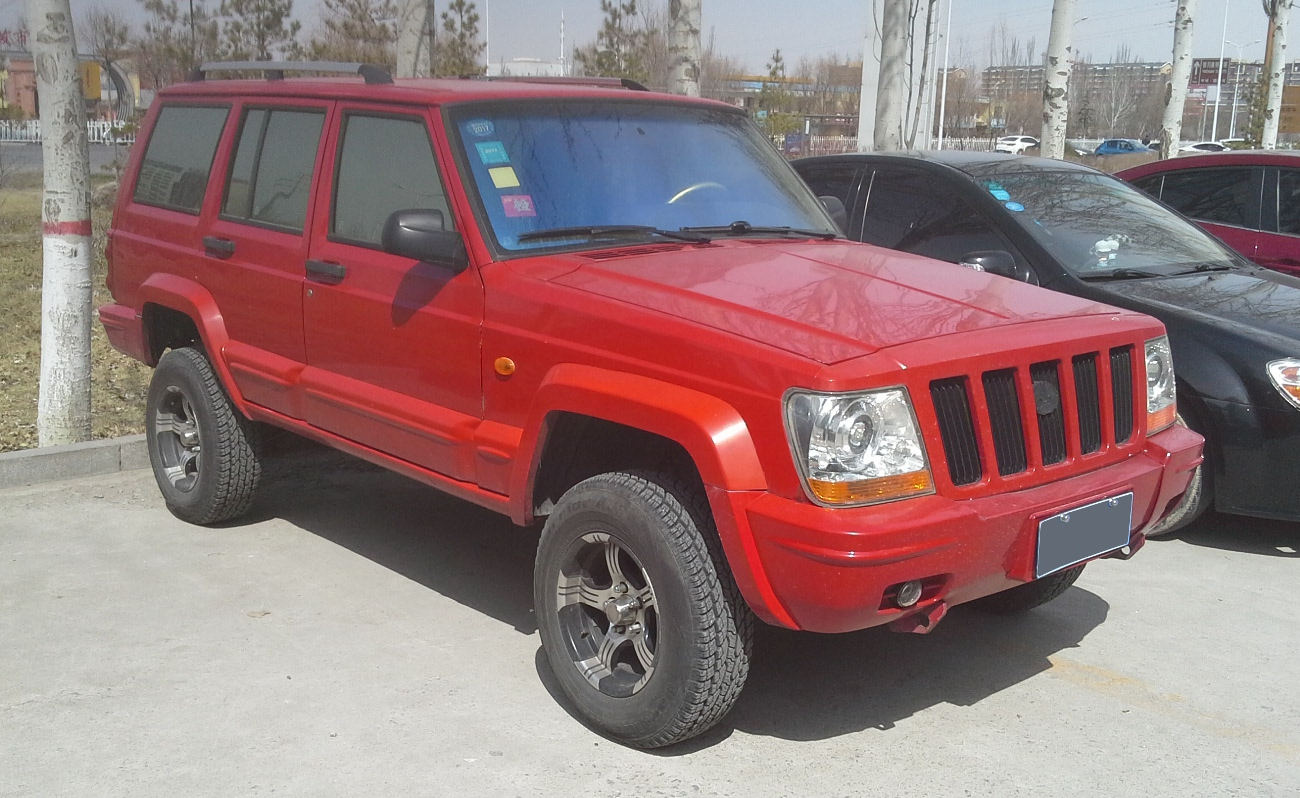
BAW Qishi (2009–2014)

American Motors established the first automobile manufacturing joint venture in the People's Republic of China, Beijing Jeep, in 1984 to assemble the four-door Cherokee. Production continued after Chrysler's buyout of AMC. The Chinese market BJ 7250 (rear-wheel drive) and BJ 2021 (four-wheel drive) had a raised roof in the rear, as they were often meant to be chauffeur-driven. The BJ2021 was available with a 2.5 L engine and a four-speed manual gearbox for the 1985 through 2005 model years. For 1993, a 4.0 L I6 version was available paired to a five-speed manual transmission. The BJ7250 uses the same 2.5 L engine as the BJ2021, but includes a five-speed manual gearbox instead of a four-speed unit.

The BJ2021 is 4290 millimeters in length, 1800 millimeters in width, and 1620 millimeters in height as well as using a 2580 millimeter wheelbase. The BJ7250, however, is 90 millimeters shorter in length, 40 millimeters shorter in width and 10 millimeters taller and is 5 millimeters shorter in wheelbase.

Production under Mercedes-Benz continued in the partnership that was renamed Beijing-Benz DaimlerChrysler Automotive. The most recent model with an updated grille, headlights, and other upgrades was known as the Jeep 2500 and was produced until 2005. It is notable that AMC's original Cherokee design continued to be built and sold after being virtually unchanged for over twenty years.

The design of the Chinese market Jeeps was similar to that of the U.S.-market Jeeps, except for a new front grille and headlamps, as well as new tail lamps. The interior also featured a new steering wheel and center console.

The BJ2500, produced by Beijing Jeep was available with the 2.4 L 4G64 engine from Mitsubishi, 2.5 L and 2.7 L engines known as C498QA. Pricing ranged from 115,000 to 127,900 yuan (US$16,600 to $18,470) for 2.5 L models and was 128,000 yuan for the 2.7 L version (US$18,480). The 4.0 L and 4.7 L engines were known as C698QA1 and C8V93Q respectively, and both power the Jeep Grand Cherokee (WJ).

After 2009, Beijing Auto Works continued the production of the Chinese-market XJ Cherokee as the BAW Qishi 骑士 (Knight in Chinese). The Qishi uses a 2.0 L I4 and 2.2 L I4 known as the 4G20 and 4G22, both old Nissan units, and a five-slot grille, along with six-lug wheels. Production ended in 2014. All Chinese specification Jeeps had a five-speed manual gearbox as standard.

External videos
- Booknotes interview with Jim Mann on Beijing Jeep: The Short, Unhappy Romance of American Business in China, February 4, 1990, C-SPAN

Chinese car manufacturer Shuanghuan Auto, who are known for their copy of the Toyota Land Cruiser Prado (J120) front end, BMW X5 (E53) rear end and BMW X3 side skirt designed car, the Shuanghuan SCEO, also made a copy of the Jeep Cherokee XJ known as the Shuanghuan SHZJ213. The BJ212 platform was used. The SHZJ213 used a 2.4 L BAW 492 engine paired to a five-speed manual gearbox. Production ran from 1994 until 1997.

Numerous other Chinese firms also made clones of the four-door Cherokee XJ as well as pickup versions.

== Manufacture ==
The XJ was manufactured in Toledo, Ohio, USA; Beijing, China; Ferreyra, Argentina; Cairo, Egypt; and in Valencia, Venezuela, with production reaching approximately 3 million between 1983 and 2001.

== Name revival in the U.S. ==
On February 22, 2013, Chrysler released press photos of the new replacement for the Liberty, and also announced that the new model would bring back the Cherokee name. The new Cherokee (KL) was built on the compact U.S. wide platform, and featured a nine-speed automatic, a choice of a 2.4 L Tigershark I4 with Fiat's electro-hydraulic MultiAir 2 variable valve timing and variable valve lift or a 3.2 L V6 based on the Pentastar 3.6 L V6, and front- and four-wheel drive (the latter using Jeep's Selec-Terrain system). The Liberty was sold outside of North America as the Jeep Cherokee (KK), allowing the new Cherokee to be easily marketed globally. Jeep marketing used the Cherokee name to attract previous Jeep owners and build on the name's heritage. This new Cherokee was built in Toledo, Ohio and in Belvidere, Illinois.
