= Aisin AX15 transmission =

Manual transmission system

The AX15 built by Aisin was used in Jeeps with the AMC 242 (4.0L) Inline 6 engine, as well as the AMC 258 (4.2L) Inline 6 engine and AMC 150 (2.5L) Straight 4 engine. This included vehicles such as the Cherokee(XJ), Comanche (MJ), and Wrangler (YJ and TJ) and 1994-1995 Jeep Grand Cherokee ZJ as well as the 1st and 2nd generations of the Dodge Dakota. Starting in 1988 (mid-year) it was used in the Cherokee and Wrangler models until 1999 when it was replaced with the NV3550.

The AX15 had a 23 spline output shaft and mated to the NP231 as well as the NP207 transfer case. Between 1988 and 1993, the transmission featured an internal slave cylinder, the next year (1994), the transmission was redesigned to have an external slave cylinder for easier maintenance. All versions of the AX15 feature brass synchronizer rings and require API GL-3 lubricant.

Gear Ratios
1st	2nd	3rd	4th	5th	Reverse
3.83:1	2.33:1	1.44:1	1.00:1	0.79:1	4.22:1
