= Dana 30 =

Automotive axle

The Dana/Spicer Model 30 is an automotive axle manufactured by Dana Holding Corporation. It has been manufactured as a beam axle and independent suspension axle with several versions.

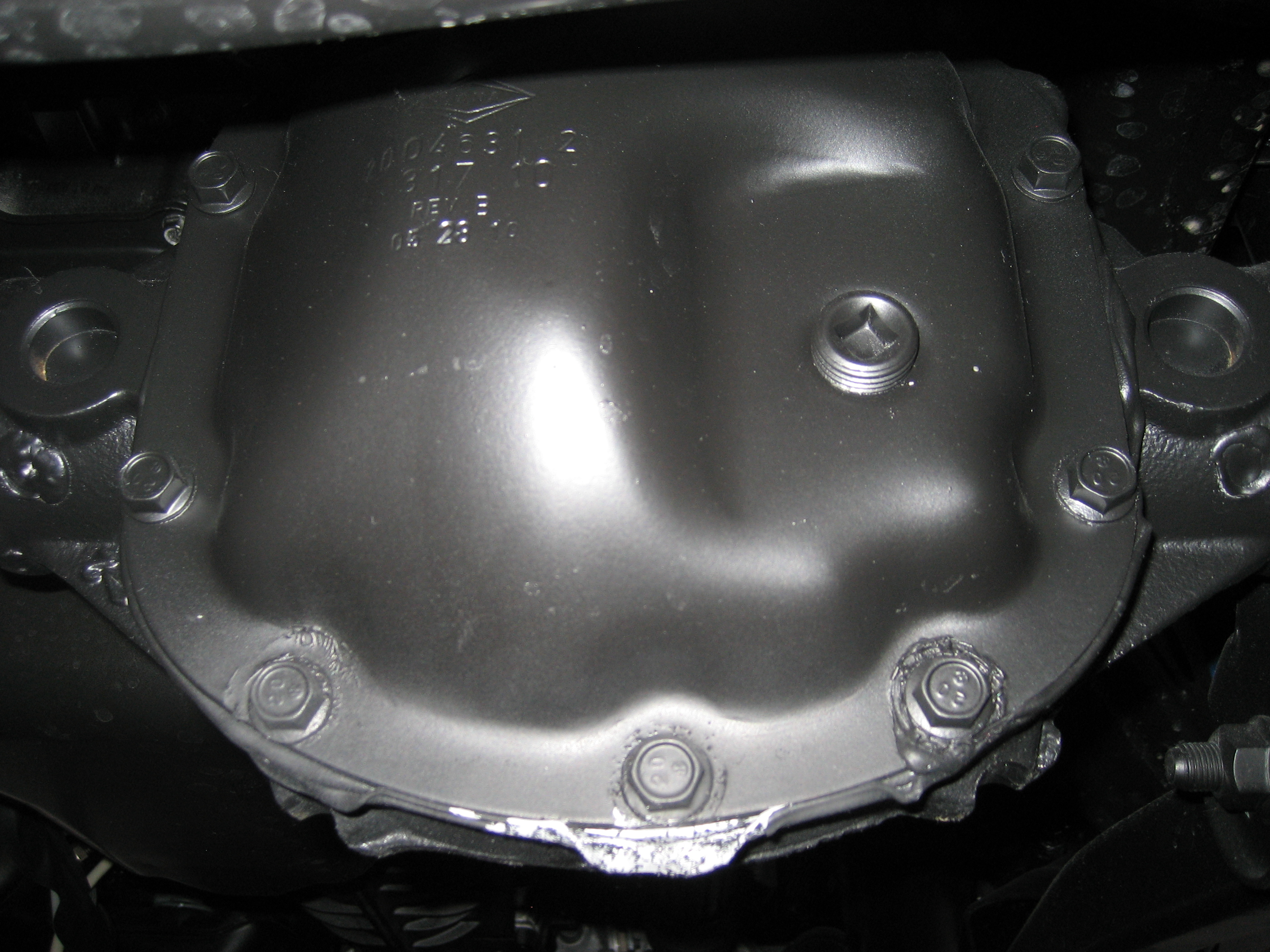
2011 Jeep Dana 30 differential

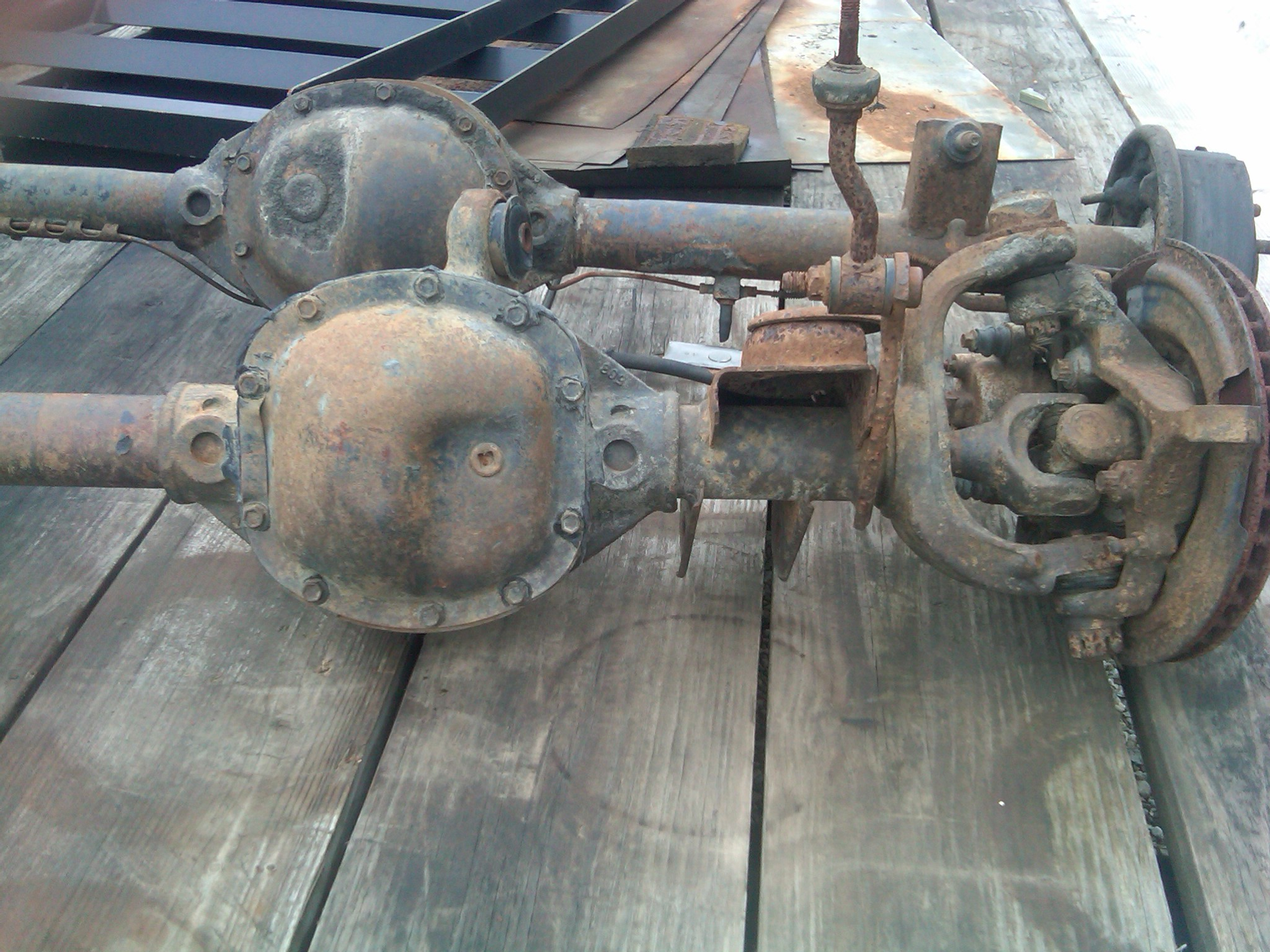
Jeep Dana 30

== General specifications ==
- Ring Gear measures 7.12 inches (181 mm)
- OEM Inner axle shaft spline count: 27
- GAWR up to 2770 lbs.
- Gear Ratios 3.07:1, 3.54:1, 3.73:1 or 4.10:1 (Jeep YJ)

== Dana 30 solid axles ==
=== Dana 23 ===
The Dana Spicer 23 is an axle the Dana 30 is loosely based, with improvements throughout time. This axle was only made for the rear of vehicles. Full floating and semi floating variations were produced.

=== Dana 25 ===
The Dana Spicer 25 was based on the Dana 23 and was made only as a front axle for four-wheel drive vehicles. This was the company's first front drive axle.

=== Dana 27 ===
The Dana Spicer 27 unit phased out Dana 23 and Dana 25 units in the 1960s

== Common applications ==
- 1966-1971 Ford Bronco
- 1984-2001 Jeep Cherokee (XJ) (used until 2005 in Chinese XJs)
- 1987-1996 Jeep Wrangler (YJ)
- 1997-2006 Jeep Wrangler (TJ)
- 1972-1986 Jeep (CJ)
- 1972-1973 Jeep Commando (C104)
- 1971-1973 Jeep Wagoneer (SJ)
- 1971-1973 Jeep J-Series pickup (SJ)
- 1993-1998 Jeep Grand Cherokee (ZJ)
- 1999-2005 Jeep Grand Cherokee (WJ)
- 1986-1992 Jeep Comanche
- 1969-1974 International Scout

== Independent front suspension Dana 30 axle ==
Jeep Liberty 4x4 models use the Dana 30 in the form of independent suspension in the front (IFS).

The AMC Eagle front axle is also a Dana 30 IFS.
