= Jeep Wrangler (YJ) =

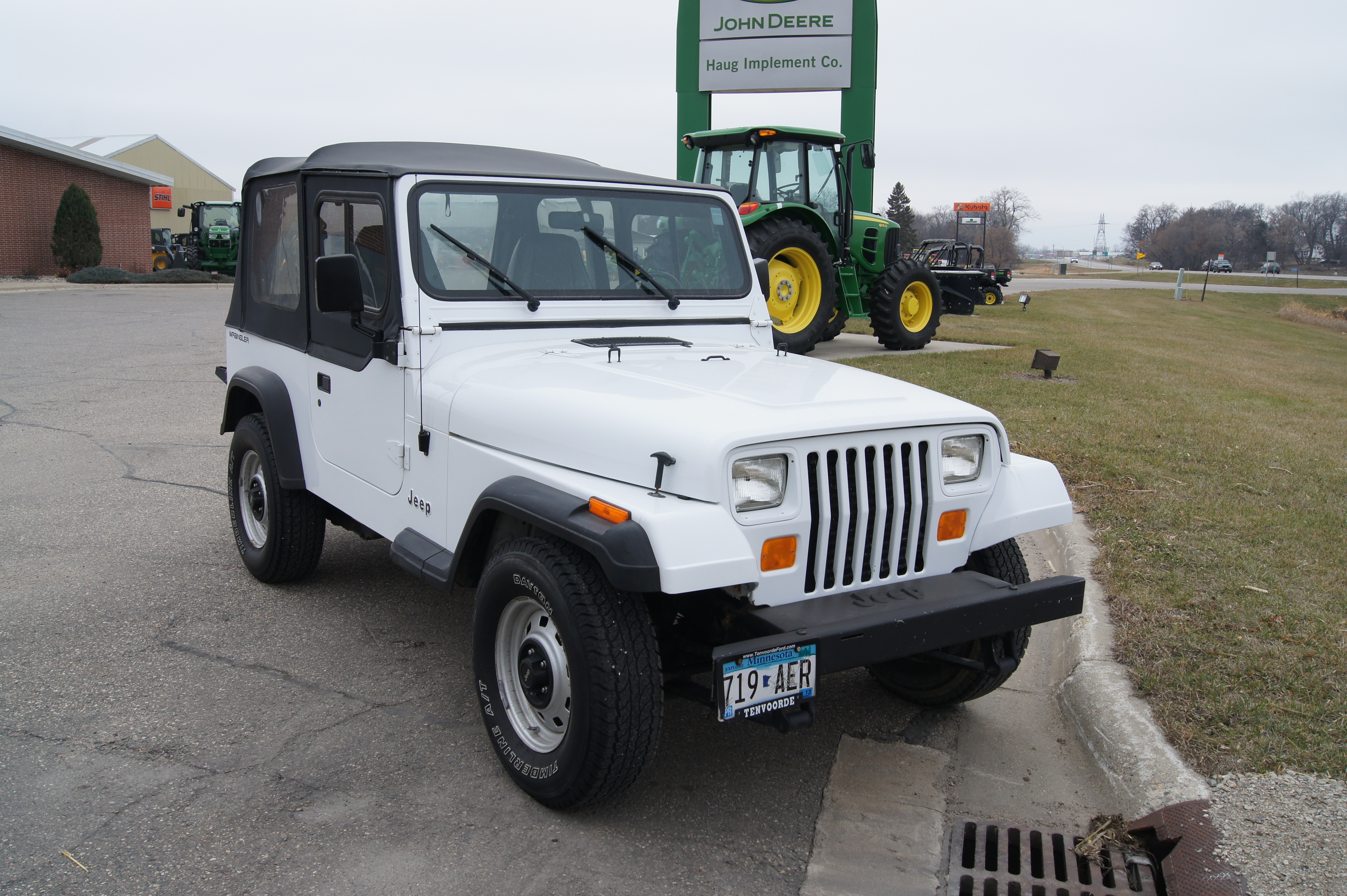

Overview
- Manufacturer: American Motors (1986–1987); Chrysler Corporation (1987–1995)
- Also called: Jeep YJ (Canada)
- Production: March 1986 – December 1995 (Canada, U.S.); 1989–2001 (Iran); 1995–1998 (Indonesia)
- Model years: 1987–1995
- Assembly: United States: Toledo, Ohio (Toledo Complex); Canada: Brampton, Ontario (Brampton Assembly Plant); Iran: Tehran (Pars Khodro); Venezuela: Carabobo (Ensambladora Carabobo)
- Designer: Chuck Mashigan (1983)

Body and chassis
- Body style: 2-door convertible 2-door SUV
- Related: AIL Storm I

Powertrain
- Engine: 2.5 L AMC 150 I4 Complete engine specs: •Displacement: 150.4 CID (2,465 cc); •Stroke: 3.188 in (8 cm); •Bore: 3.875 in (10 cm); •Power: varied; •Torque: varied; •Fuel Type: Gasoline; 4.0 L AMC 242 I6 Complete engine specs: •Displacement: 242.1 CID (3,968 cc); •Stroke: 3.413 in (87 mm); •Bore: 3.88 in (99 mm); •Power: 177–190 hp; •Torque: 224 LbFt; •Fuel Type: Gasoline; 4.2 L AMC 258 I6 Complete engine specs: •Displacement: ~258.1 CID (~4,230 cc); •Stroke: 3.895 in (10 cm); •Bore: 3.75 in (10 cm); •Power: 112–117 hp; •Torque: 210 LbFt; •Fuel Type: Gasoline
- Transmission: 3-speed TorqueFlite TF904 automatic 3-speed TorqueFlite TF999 automatic 5-speed Aisin AX-5 manual 5-speed Aisin AX-15 manual 5-speed Peugeot BA-10/5 manual Transfer case: 1986–1987 New Process NP207 1988–1995 New Process NP231; Rear axle: Dana 35, Dana 44 optional in some years Front axle: Dana 30

Dimensions
- Wheelbase: 93.4 in (2,372 mm)
- Length: 1986–1989: 152.6 in (3,880 mm); 1989–1992: 153 in (3,900 mm); 1992–1995: 151.9 in (3,860 mm)
- Width: 66 in (1,700 mm) without fender flares: 59 in (1,499 mm)
- Height: 1993–1995: 71.9 in (1,826 mm); 1986–1992 soft-top: 72 in (1,829 mm); 1986–1992 hardtop: 69.6 in (1,768 mm)
- Curb weight: 2,855–3,241 lb (1,295–1,470 kg)

Chronology
- Predecessor: Jeep CJ-7
- Successor: Jeep Wrangler (TJ)

The Jeep Wrangler (YJ) is the first generation of Jeep Wrangler four-wheel drive small off-road vehicles, rebadging and succeeding Jeep's CJ series, which was produced from 1944 to 1986. The first Wrangler (internally "YJ") was launched in 1986 and ran through 1995. Although the new Wrangler stood out from its CJ predecessors by its square headlights, its body was a direct evolution of the preceding CJ-7, and rode on the same wheelbase. The Wrangler featured an updated interior, offered more comfort, and improved safety and handling through a revised chassis that included a wider track and a slightly lower stance.

Development of a potential CJ-7 replacement was green-lit in 1982, with engineering and design work (under Chuck Mashigan) commencing. After approval earlier in 1983, a final design freeze occurred by the fall of 1983, with CJ-7-based mules being built in late 1983 and the first production body test prototypes in the spring of 1984. By late 1985, development concluded, as the transition from pilot to series production began. In February 1986, the 1987 model year Jeep Wrangler was unveiled. It entered production in March and went on sale on May 13, 1986.

== History ==
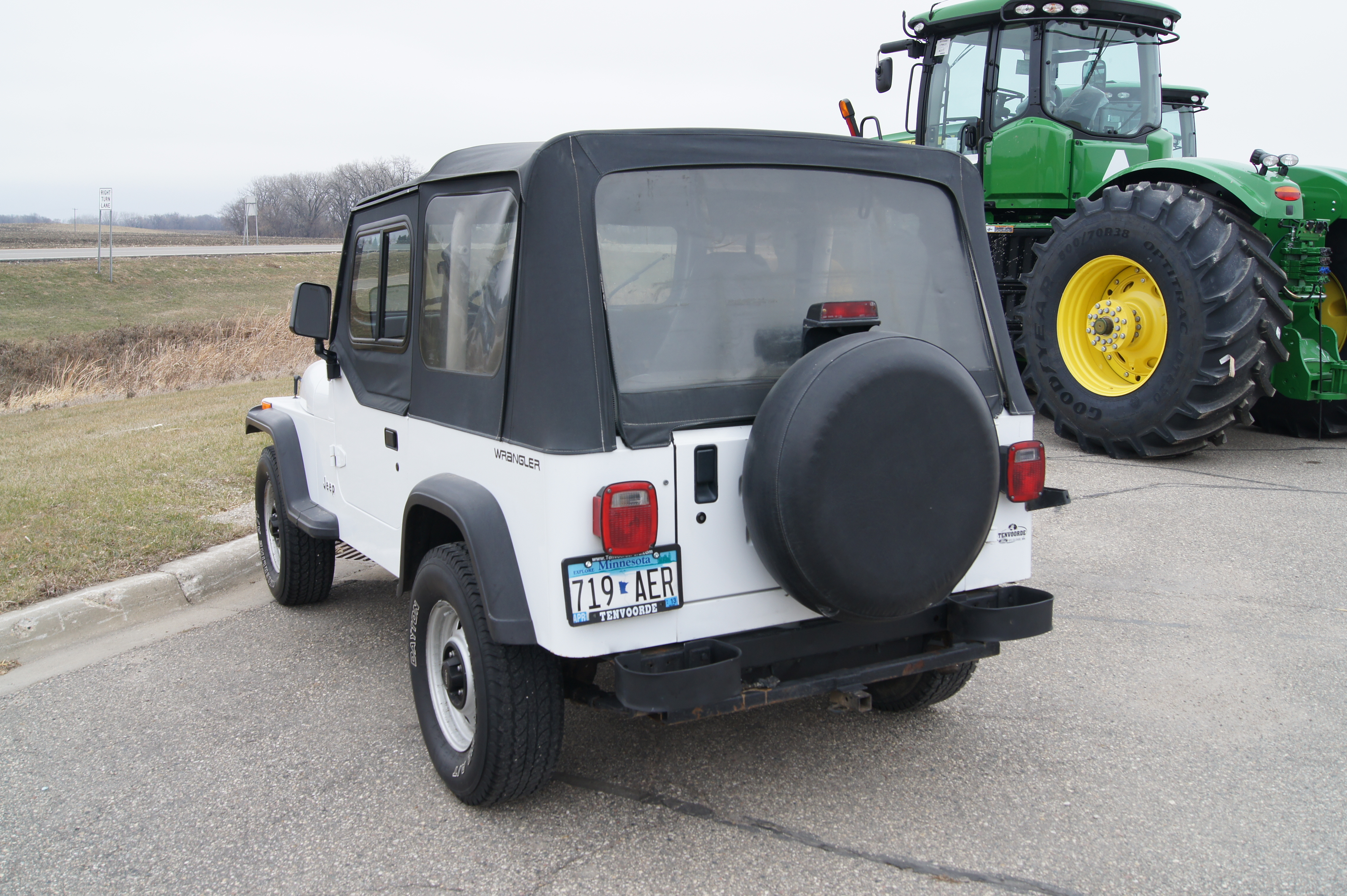
Rear view

The Jeep YJ, sold as the Wrangler in the United States, replaced the Jeep CJ line in 1986 and was built in Brampton, Ontario, Canada, until the plant closed on April 23, 1992. Production was then moved to Toledo, Ohio, using the same plant that produced the Willys Jeeps during World War II. Jeep could not use the Wrangler name in Canada, as General Motors of Canada had used it on various trucks as a trim level and owned the rights to the name there.

American Motors Corporation (AMC) had designed the new Jeep to be more comfortable on-road in an attempt to attract more daily drivers. It was a significantly new design with a wider track, slightly less ground clearance, more comfort, and improved handling. The YJ still had leaf spring suspension similar to that of the CJ – however the springs were wider, and the first Wrangler sported trackbar suspension links and anti-roll bars for improved handling and safety, making it less easy to flip by untrained or unwary drivers.

Despite the new grille, the body is very similar to that of the CJ-7, and it is interchangeable with some minor modifications. The YJ was also given a larger windshield over the CJ. The YJs are easily identifiable due to the rectangular headlights and the fact that the wiper blades rest on the windshield, giving this version a distinctive look. The blades rested on the windshield due to the now wider arc of the blades to clean the larger windshield. These two changes were later removed when the TJ was launched in 1996. 632,231 YJs were built through the 1995 model year, although YJs were still sold into mid-1996, bringing the total production number to 685,071 units.

The YJ used a 2.5L AMC 150 I4 or optional 4.2L AMC 258 I6 until 1990. Power outputs at the time of introduction are 117 hp (87 kW) for the fuel-injected four-cylinder, while the carbureted 'six only produces 112 hp (84 kW), albeit with more than fifty percent more torque than the smaller engine. Starting in 1991, a fuel-injected, 190 hp (142 kW) 4.0-liter AMC 242 variant replaced the AMC 258 straight-six unit. The NP207 transfer case was used only in 1987 and was replaced by the NP231.

In 1988, the Sahara model debuted. The roll cage was extended in 1992 to allow for rear shoulder belts. Also, that year, the YJ switched over to an electronic speedometer, outmoding the cable speedometers on older YJs. 1992 Saharas were featured in the 1993 blockbuster film Jurassic Park. Anti-lock brakes were added as an option in 1993. An automatic transmission option for four-cylinder Wranglers came in 1994, as well as a standard center high-mounted brake light. Also, the clutch slave cylinder on manual transmission Wranglers was moved outside of the transmission's bellhousing to allow for easier replacement. In 1995, the Dana 30 larger U-joints were used [front axle U-joints (297x) and rear pinion U-joint (1330)].

There were no 1996 model year Jeep Wranglers. The last YJs were sold as 1995 model years but featured a few new parts not seen on any earlier YJ. This included the new TJ bumpstops on the hood (rubber boots vs the traditional U-bars), reinforced tailgate hinges, and some even had rear TJ bumpers. Some also got the newly tuned straight-6 engine that was designed to run quieter in preparation for the TJ.

Top options for YJ were the same as those offered on TJ. A Soft top with "half doors", featuring soft plastic zipper windows, came standard (windows could be removed completely from these doors). Full-frame doors with conventional glass windows were optional on soft-top models. Hard tops with rear wiper and defroster were optional, but came standard with full-framed doors. The YJ featured large mirrors with manually adjustable arms on half-door models, while full-framed doors received smaller adjustable mirrors with fixed arms (which were mounted further away from the door corner, compared to the larger-style mirrors). Depending on the year and interior color, Jeeps could be had with the top colors in black, white, tan, and gray. Roll-bar padding normally matched the top color, except for white tops.

== Powertrain ==
| Engine | Year | Transmission |
|---|---|---|
| 2.5L AMC straight-4 engine | 1987–1995 | 5-speed AX-5 manual |
| 2.5L AMC straight-4 engine | 1994–1995 | 3-speed 30RH(A904) automatic |
| 4.2L AMC straight-6 engine | 1987–1990 | 3-speed A999 automatic |
| 4.2L AMC straight-6 engine | 1987–1989 | 5-speed BA-10 manual |
| 4.2L AMC straight-6 engine | 1989–1990 | 5-speed AX-15 manual |
| 4.0L AMC straight-6 engine | 1991 | 3-speed A999 automatic |
| 4.0L AMC straight-6 engine | 1991–1995 | 3-speed 32RH(A999) automatic |
| 4.0L AMC straight-6 engine | 1991–1995 | 5-speed AX-15 manual |

== YJ Wrangler Islander ==
From 1988 to 1993, Jeep produced an options package known as the "Islander". Several colors were offered, such as Bright Red, Pacific Blue, Malibu Yellow, Navajo Turquoise, and White, and both engines were offered. Features of the package are as follows:

- Body-color wheel flares and side steps
- Sunset graphics on the lower body and hood
- Islander logo on front fenders and spare tire cover
- Wrangler decals or embossments
- Optional 20-gallon fuel tank
- Gray interior and highback seats
- Optional 5-spoke Alloy Wheels
- Floor carpeting
- Center console with cupholders
- Full or half doors

== YJ Wrangler Renegade ==
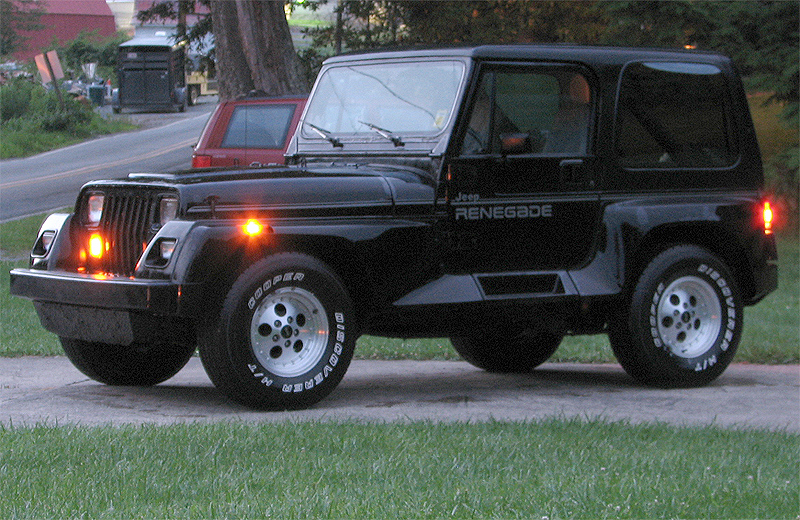
1991 Jeep Renegade

From October 1990 until 1994, Jeep produced an options package on the YJ Wrangler listed as the "Renegade Decor Group". Vehicles were shipped as optioned Wranglers to Autostyle in the Detroit area, where the Renegade Decor Package was installed, then shipped back to Jeep for delivery to dealers. Renegades all have a small sticker on the driver's side door, right above the latch, denoting the visit to Autostyle. Initially, all Renegades were white, black, or red. Blue and bronze were added for the 1992 and 1993 model years, respectively. The Renegade Decor Group was a $4,266 option over a base Wrangler for 1991 and included special alloy wheels, exclusive body flares, along many other features. Contents of the Renegade Decor Package include:

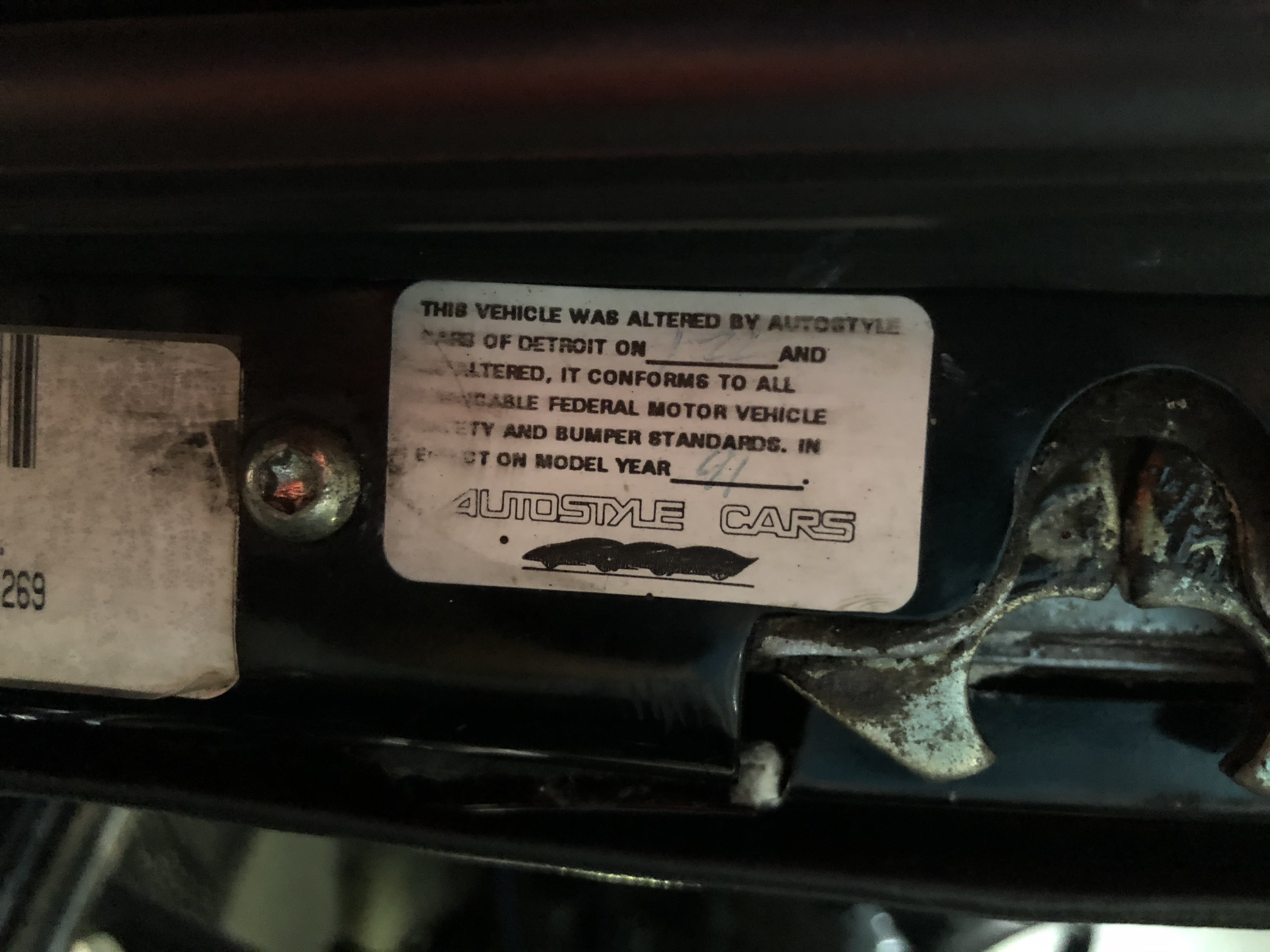
Door Jamb Sticker for Jeep Renegade models

- 4.0 Liter (242 CID) I-6 Engine
- 30x9.5R15 LT OWL Wrangler A/T Tires
- Exclusive 5-hole aluminum wheels, 8 inches wide
- Full-size spare tire
- Highback seats with Trailcloth Fabric
- Off-road gas shock absorbers
- Power steering
- Fog lamps (integrated into the front fenders)
- Leather-wrapped steering wheel
- Renegade striping (door letters)
- Floor carpeting (full width, and on the insides of the body tub)
- Floor mats, front
- Extra capacity fuel tank (20 US gal.)
- Color-keyed fender flares with integrated bodyside steps
- Front and rear bumperettes (plastic)
- Center console with cup holders
- Courtesy and engine compartment lights
- Interval wipers
- Glove box lock

A hardtop was a $923.00 option and came with a mandatory rear window defroster at $164.00. Although soft-top models came standard with "half doors", full framed doors with glass windows were an option, and as on all 6-cylinder Wranglers, air-conditioning was also an option. Renegades typically had the tilt steering wheel ($130.00) and an AM/FM/cassette stereo radio ($264.00). A column shift automatic was also an available option, but it was not popular.

== AIL Storm ==
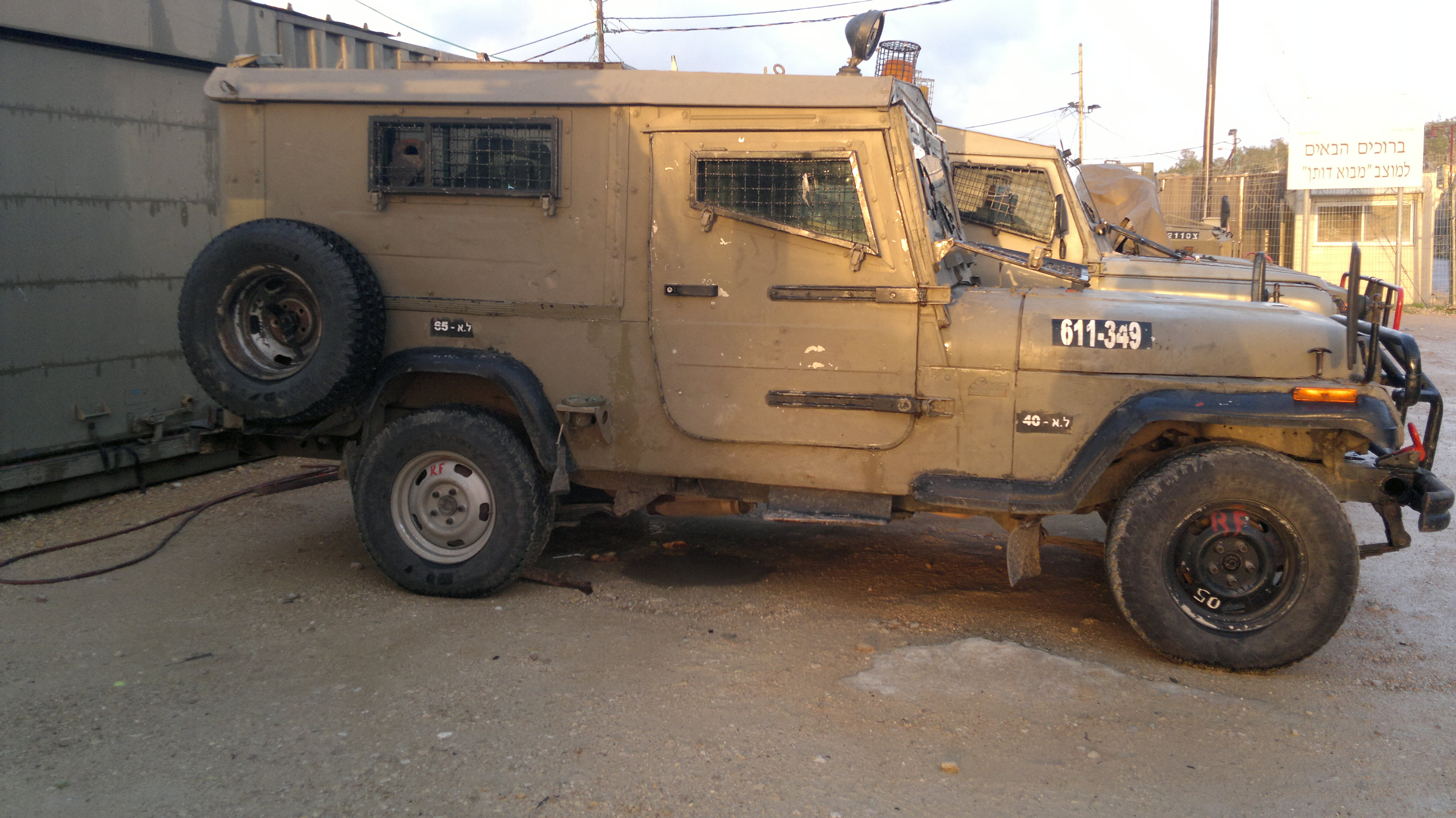
Up-armored AIL Storm I, ("Sufa")

Israeli military carmaker Automotive Industries Ltd. introduced its first generation of the AIL Storm, the workhorse off-road vehicle of the Israeli Security Forces, as a variant of the 1991 Wrangler YJ, but on the 103.5 in (263 cm) CJ-6 / CJ-8 wheelbase. AIL builds the vehicles in-house with the exception of various externally sourced engines. Long and short wheelbase versions were also available for civilian purchase.

A Jeep-managed production line in Egypt supplied vehicles for the Egyptian armed forces. After 1995, this facility was absorbed into the AIL Storm production.

== Trim levels ==
North American YJ/Wranglers were available in the following standard trims.

- Base: also referred to as "S" & "SE" at different points in the model run; for the first few years the back seat and rear bumperettes were optional, some years the 6cyl engine was an option, other years only the 4cyl was available in the "Base" model. An AM radio (later AM/FM stereo) with two speakers came standard, as did high-back vinyl bucket seats and a heater and blower. An AM/FM stereo, cassette player, and air conditioning were optional. In 1986, a basic Wrangler Base cost $8,995 MSRP, or $26,246 in 2025.
- Laredo: Chrome grille, bumpers, and trim, hard top and hard full doors, tinted windows, in 1988 cloth seats replaced the base model's vinyl, faux leather interior, body color fender flares and alloy wheels. An AM/FM stereo with cassette player, rear speaker sound bar, air conditioning, rear removable bench seat, and high-back cloth bucket seats all came standard.'LAREDO' decals adorned the hood on both sides or on the lower front fenders as part of the side stripes.
- Islander: See Islander
- Sport: Which featured "sport" graphics and, beginning in 1991, a 4.0L 242 CID inline-6-cylinder engine. An AM/FM stereo with two speakers and a rear removable bench seat came standard. A cassette player, rear speaker sound bar, cloth high-back bucket seats, and air conditioning were optional.
- Sahara: Which came standard with most available options, including body color fender flares and steel wheels, also included with the Sahara edition are special green trail-cloth seats with storage pockets, interior door panels with pockets, front bumper mounted fog lamps, and plastic ends on the front bumper). An AM/FM stereo with cassette player, rear speaker sound bar, unique cloth-and-vinyl high-back bucket seats, rear removable bench seat, exterior color steel wheels were standard on this model. 'Sahara Edition' decals adorned both front fenders.
- Renegade: See Renegade.
- Rio Grande: Available in champagne gold, moss green, white, along with the rare colors aqua pearl metallic, and Bright Mango; with a Pueblo themed interior trim package. This trim was only available in 1995, and was added to spice up the base 4-cylinder Wrangler 'S' models. A cassette player, rear speaker sound bar, and cloth high-back bucket seats came standard, and air conditioning and alloy wheels were all available on this model. Red-and-orange 'Rio Grande' decals adorned both rear quarter panels. A trac lock rear limited slip differential and dealer installed winch were options on all models.
