= Jeep Grand Cherokee (WK2) =

Fourth-generation Jeep Grand Cherokee (WK2)
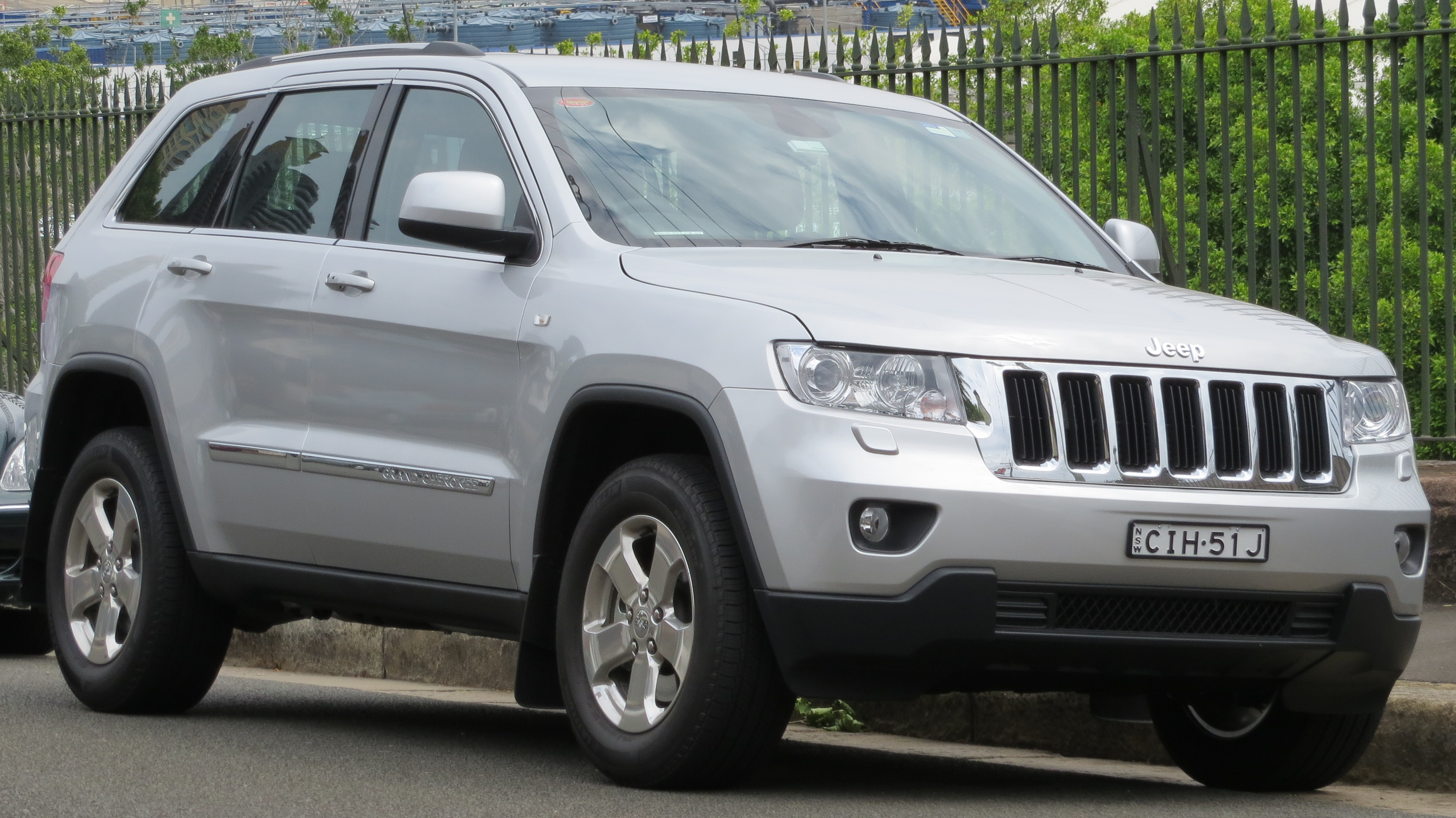

Overview
- Manufacturer: Jeep (Note: Chrysler Group LLC (2010–2014); FCA US LLC (2014–2021); Stellantis North America (2021-2022))
- Also called: Jeep Grand Cherokee WK (2022)
- Production: May 2010–2022
- Model years: 2011–2022
- Assembly: United States: Detroit, Michigan; Mexico: Toluca (German Shields for FCA Mexico) (armor modifications only for Mexican market Grand Cherokee Armored model); Venezuela: Valencia, Carabobo (Carabobo Assembly); Egypt: Cairo (AAV)
- Designer: Mark Allen

Body and chassis
- Class: Mid-size SUV
- Layout: Front-engine, rear-wheel-drive or four-wheel-drive
- Platform: Chrysler WK/WK2
- Related: Dodge Durango (WD)

Powertrain
- Engine: Gasoline: 3.0 L Pentastar V6 (China); 3.6 L Pentastar V6; 5.7 L Hemi V8; 6.2 L supercharged Hellcat Hemi V8 (Trackhawk); 6.4 L Hemi V8 (SRT); Diesel: 3.0 L VM Motori A 630 DOHC V6
- Transmission: 5-speed automatic W5A580; 5-speed automatic 545RFE; 6-speed automatic 65RFE; 8-speed automatic 845RE; 8-speed automatic 850RE; 8-speed automatic 8HP70

Dimensions
- Wheelbase: 114.8 in (2,915 mm)
- Length: 189.8 in (4,821 mm)
- Width: 76.3 in (1,938 mm)
- Height: 69.3 in (1,760 mm)
- Curb weight: 4,533 lb (2,056 kg) (V6 RWD); 5,264 lb (2,388 kg) (V8 4WD)

Chronology
- Predecessor: Jeep Grand Cherokee (WK)
- Successor: Jeep Grand Cherokee (WL)

The fourth-generation Jeep Grand Cherokee (WK2) is a mid-size SUV produced by the American marque Jeep from mid-2010 to 2022. It was introduced in 2010 for the 2011 model year by Jeep. The unveiling took place at the 2009 New York Auto Show, where it received 30 awards.

== Design ==
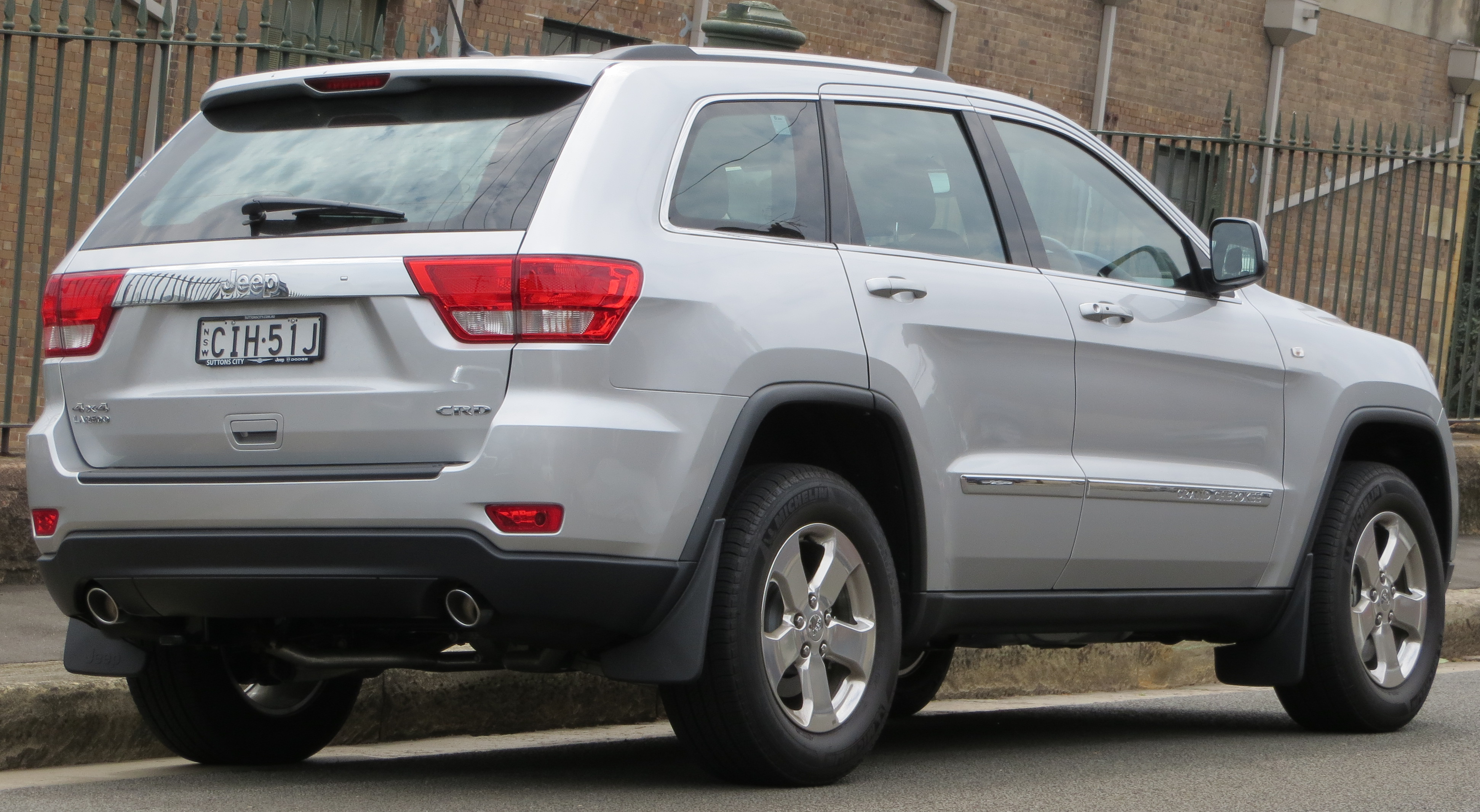
Pre-facelift Jeep Grand Cherokee Laredo CRD 4WD

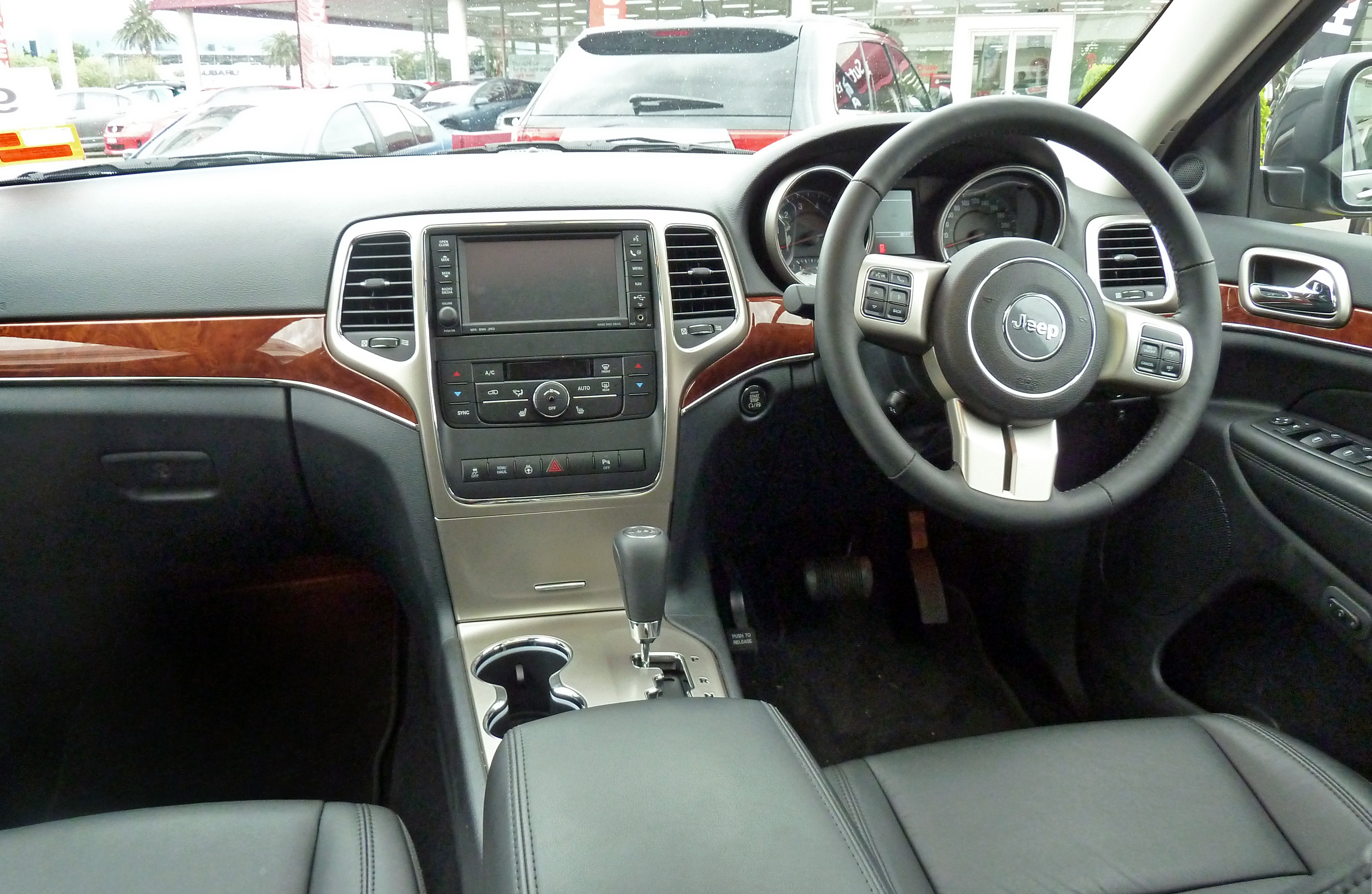
Interior (Australia; pre-facelift)

The new Grand Cherokee (code named WK2) body design represented a 146% increase in torsional rigidity compared to the previous design, which helped to improve durability and reduce noise, vibration, and harshness.

Like the previous generations, the chassis is a steel unibody. Unlike previous models, the new WK2 features a four-wheel independent suspension for better on-road handling. The Grand Cherokee (along with the 2011 Durango) uses the WK2 platform, a derivative of Mercedes-Benz's W166 series.

Four-wheel drive systems include Quadra-Trac I, Quadra-Trac II, and Quadra-Drive II. Using Selec-Terrain, the driver can select from Auto, Sport, Snow, Sand/Mud, and Rock modes.

Optional height-adjustable air suspension, which Jeep refers to as "Quadra-Lift", can raise the vehicle's ground clearance to 11.1 in (282 mm).

== Powertrain ==
Engine choices included the 3.6 L Pentastar V6 or the 5.7 L Hemi V8. The Hemi V8 retained the Multiple Displacement System (MDS) that shuts down four cylinders in low-power driving situations, and the V8 remains coupled with the multi-speed automatic transmission, which includes Electronic Range Selection (ERS) to limit the high gear operating range manually. Trailer towing capacity is rated 7,400 lb (3,400 kg) for Hemi models and 5,000 lb (2,300 kg) for Pentastar models.

The 3.6 L Pentastar V6 replaced the 3.7 L and 4.7 L PowerTech engines. The 5.7 L Hemi engine was retained as the V8 option, although no Hemi badging is used on the exterior of the vehicle. Also, the WK program code remained unchanged.

A 3.0 L turbocharged diesel V6 developed and built by Fiat Powertrain Technologies and VM Motor (with Multijet II injection) rated at 177 kW (241 PS; 237 hp) and 550 N⋅m (406 lbf⋅ft) of torque is offered in export markets by mid-2011. On January 14, 2013, at the Detroit Auto Show, Jeep announced that this new EcoDiesel engine will become available in the 2014- 2021 Grand Cherokee, Australian Ver 2014 3.0 L turbodiesel V6 is available, producing 184kW and 570Nm of torque. together with the new 8HP70 8-speed automatic transmission. The new 3.0 L CRD turbodiesel engine is offered in European markets in a 140 kW (190 PS; 188 hp) low-power version.

The SRT Hellcat supercharged V8 was made available for the Grand Cherokee Trackhawk. With 707 hp (527 kW), it was the most powerful SUV produced by Chrysler as of 2021.

Engines
Years	Engine	Displacement	Power	Torque	Notes
2011–2021	3.6 L Pentastar V6	220 CID (3,604 cc)	290 hp (216 kW; 294 PS)	260 lb⋅ft (353 N⋅m)	Laredo, Laredo E, Laredo X, Altitude, Limited, Sterling Edition, Trailhawk, Overland, High Altitude, Summit
2011–2021	5.7 L Hemi V8	345 CID (5,654 cc)	360 hp (268 kW; 365 PS)	390 lb⋅ft (529 N⋅m)	Laredo X (up to 2013), Altitude (up to 2013), Limited, Limited X, Sterling Edition, Trailhawk, Overland, High Altitude, Summit
2012–2021	6.4 L Hemi V8	392 CID (6,417 cc)	475 hp (354 kW; 482 PS)	470 lb⋅ft (637 N⋅m)	SRT8, SRT
2018–2021	6.2 L supercharged Hemi V8	376 CID (6,166 cc)	707 hp (527 kW; 717 PS)	645 lb⋅ft (875 N⋅m)	SRT Trackhawk
2014–2019	3.0 L L630 DOHC EcoDiesel V6	182 CID (2,987 cc)	240 hp (179 kW)	420 lb⋅ft (569 N⋅m)	U.S. spec Limited, Overland, Summit
2011–2020	3.0 L A630 DOHC CRD/Diesel V6	182 CID (2,987 cc)	188 hp (140 kW; 191 PS)	320 lb⋅ft (434 N⋅m)	Euro spec, 5- (2011–2013) and 8-speed automatic (2013–2020)
2011–2013	3.0 L A630 DOHC CRD V6	182 CID (2,987 cc)	237 hp (177 kW; 240 PS)	420 lb⋅ft (569 N⋅m)	Euro spec, 5-speed automatic
2013–2020	3.0 L A630 DOHC Diesel V6	182 CID (2,987 cc)	247 hp (184 kW; 250 PS)	420 lb⋅ft (569 N⋅m)	Euro spec, 8-speed automatic

Transmissions
Years	Model	Engines
2011–2013	W5A580 5-speed automatic	3.0, 3.6 L
2012–2013	W5A580 5-speed automatic	6.4 L
2011	545RFE 5-speed automatic	5.7 L
2012–2013	65RFE 6-speed automatic	5.7 L
2014–2017	845RE 8-speed automatic	3.6 L
2018	850RE 8-speed automatic	3.6 L
2014–2021	8HP70 8-speed automatic	3.0, 5.7, 6.4 L
2018–2021	8HP95 8-speed automatic	6.2 L

== Issues and criticism ==
=== Maneuverability and handling, 2012 ===
In 2012, Swedish automotive magazine Teknikens Värld revealed that the Jeep Grand Cherokee failed one of their avoidance maneuver tests known as the "Moose test". Other SUV models in its class had no issues passing the test. German magazine Auto, Motor und Sport (AMS) later tested the same press vehicle in a slightly different avoidance maneuver test that meets ISO (International Organization for Standardization) standards. Unlike the results of the Swedish test, the Jeep remained on all four wheels and did not lose any tires to a blowout. Teknikens Värld tested the updated 2014 Jeep Grand Cherokee and found that it passed the test; even up to a speed of 44.1 mph (71 km/h).

=== Fuel pump relay recall ===
In late 2014, the National Highway Traffic Safety Administration (NHTSA) issued a recall for 2011-2013 Jeep Grand Cherokee and Dodge Durango vehicles because the fuel pump relay may be susceptible to silicon contamination on the relay contacts, which can cause the relay to fail.

This recall can be remedied by sending the vehicle to an authorized dealer, where they will install a new fuel pump relay and wiring harness, free of charge.

(NHTSA Recall V62 - 19V - 813: Fuel Pump Relay)

=== Shifter recall ===
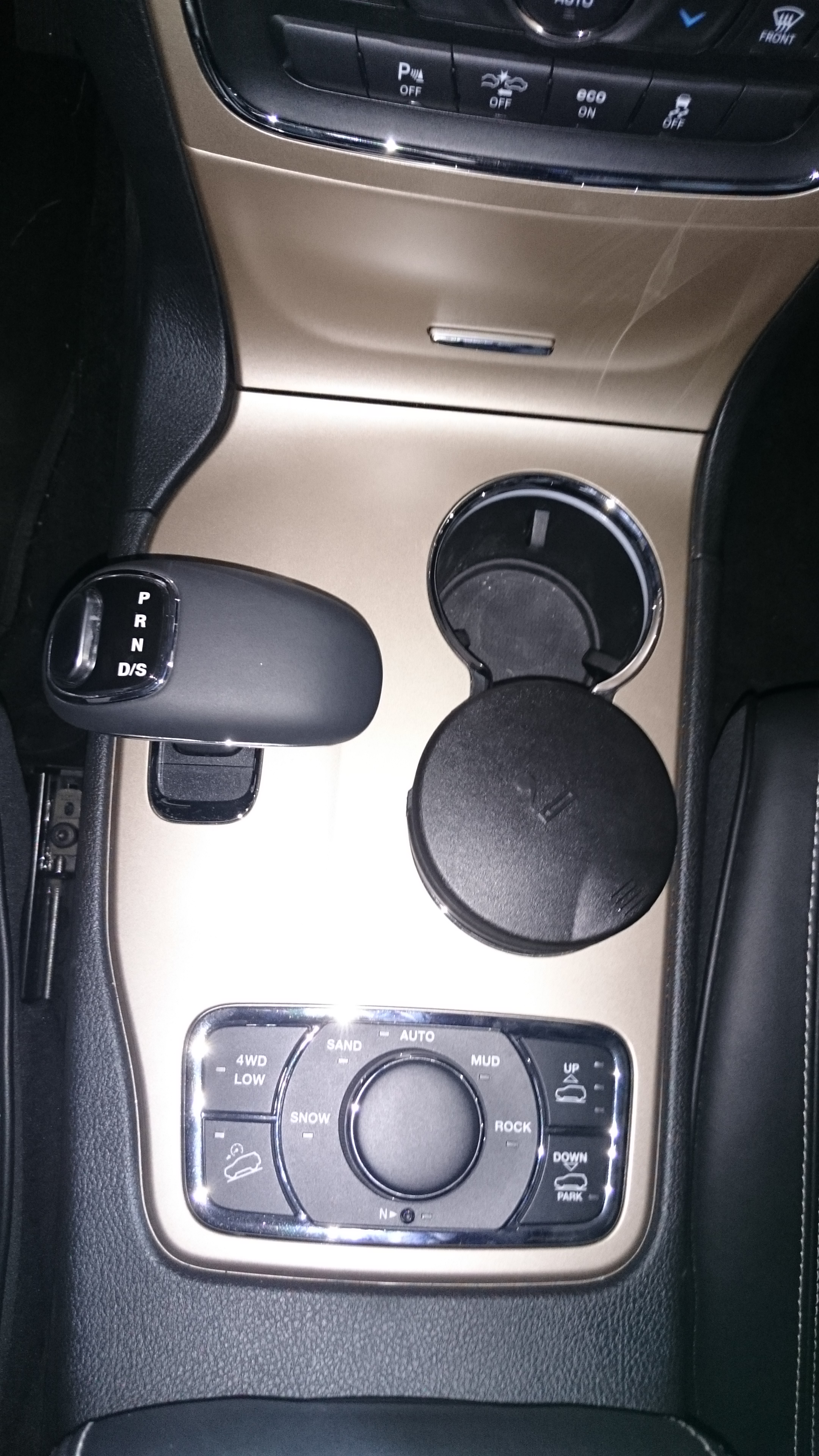
The design of the gearshift used in 2014-15 Grand Cherokees made it difficult for drivers to determine whether the vehicle was parked or still in gear.

In 2016, approximately 1.1 million 2014–2015 Jeep Grand Cherokees were recalled for rollaway risks because the design of the shifter made it difficult for drivers to determine whether or not the vehicle is still in gear. This design was discontinued in 2016 in favor of a more traditional design.

The issue was linked to 41 injuries, 212 crashes, and 308 reports of property damage and shortly after the recall was announced, actor Anton Yelchin was killed by his Grand Cherokee rolling backward into him after he exited it while it was still in gear. After Yelchin's death, the Chrysler accelerated the recall campaign and took steps to get the affected Jeeps repaired faster than originally planned. Yelchin's family filed a wrongful death lawsuit against FCA that was settled out of court in 2018.

== Updates ==
=== 2011 ===
On April 20, 2011, Jeep announced that the SRT8 version would debut at the 2011 New York Auto Show. It can accelerate from 0–60 mph (97 km/h) in 4.7 seconds and can do the quarter-mile in 13.4 seconds. Auto reviews measured this at 4.5 seconds, making the 2014 SRT the fastest Jeep ever produced at the time. The 2013-14 SRT Jeep Grand Cherokee includes a 6.4 L Hemi engine producing 470 hp (350 kW) and 465 lb⋅ft (630 N⋅m), which was the most powerful engine included in a Jeep at the time of production.

The Grand Cherokee SRT8 debuted alongside two other vehicles manufactured by Chrysler Corporation: the Chrysler 300 SRT8 and Dodge Charger SRT8, both of which also took a one-year hiatus while the new models debuted.

The new Grand Cherokee SRT8, which started production on July 16, 2011, is equipped with a 470 hp (350 kW; 477 PS) 6.4 L Hemi V8 engine. Jeep claims the new SRT8 gets 13 percent better fuel economy than its predecessor, with an EPA rating of 12 MPG city and 18 MPG highway, though it was still Jeep's least efficient vehicle in their lineup at the time. To improve gas mileage, Jeep has employed a new active exhaust system that lets Chrysler's cylinder-deactivation Fuel Saver Technology operate over a wider rpm band. Chrysler claims that with the larger gas tank, the SUV can now travel up to 500 miles (800 km) on a single tank, while other sources estimate the range to be 450 miles (720 km).

=== 2012 ===
For the 2012 model year, V8 models were updated to use the 65RFE 6-speed automatic transmission.

=== 2013 ===
For the 2013 model year, Jeep introduced the Trailhawk off-road-oriented trim. For the Overland Summit trim, Front Park Assist, power-folding side mirrors, and headlight washers became standard equipment, and Nappa leather seats became available in black or saddle-colored.

Jeep also introduced "Alpine" and "Vapor" special edition models of the Grand Cherokee SRT8. Production of each model for the U.S. market was limited to 400 units. The "Alpine" model was painted in Bright White, and the "Vapor" model was painted in Brilliant Black. Features of both models include the standard 20-inch wheels in a Black Vapor Chrome finish and a glossy black color for exterior badges, front grille trim, rear light bar, and bumper step pad.

=== 2014 ===
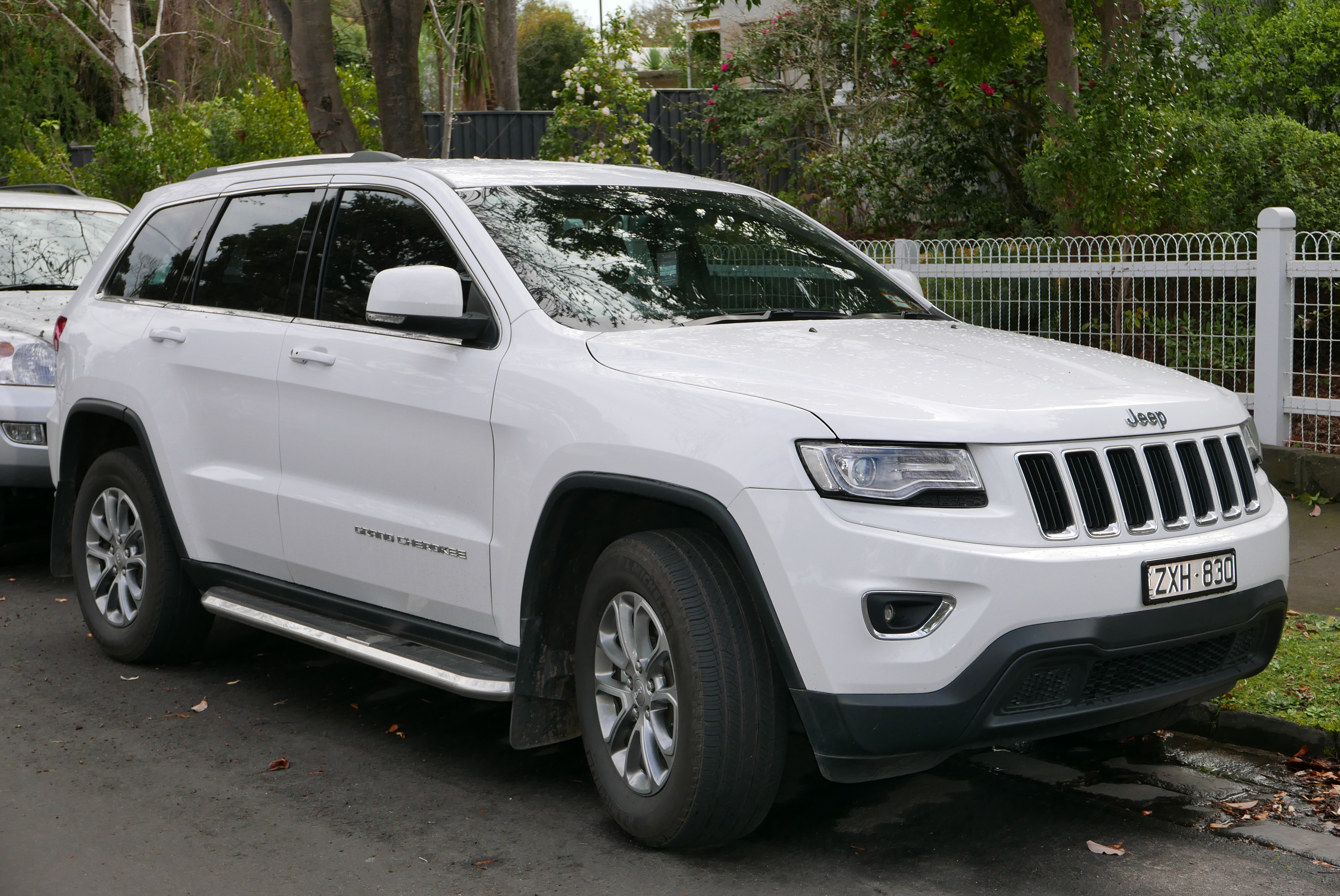
2014 model year update

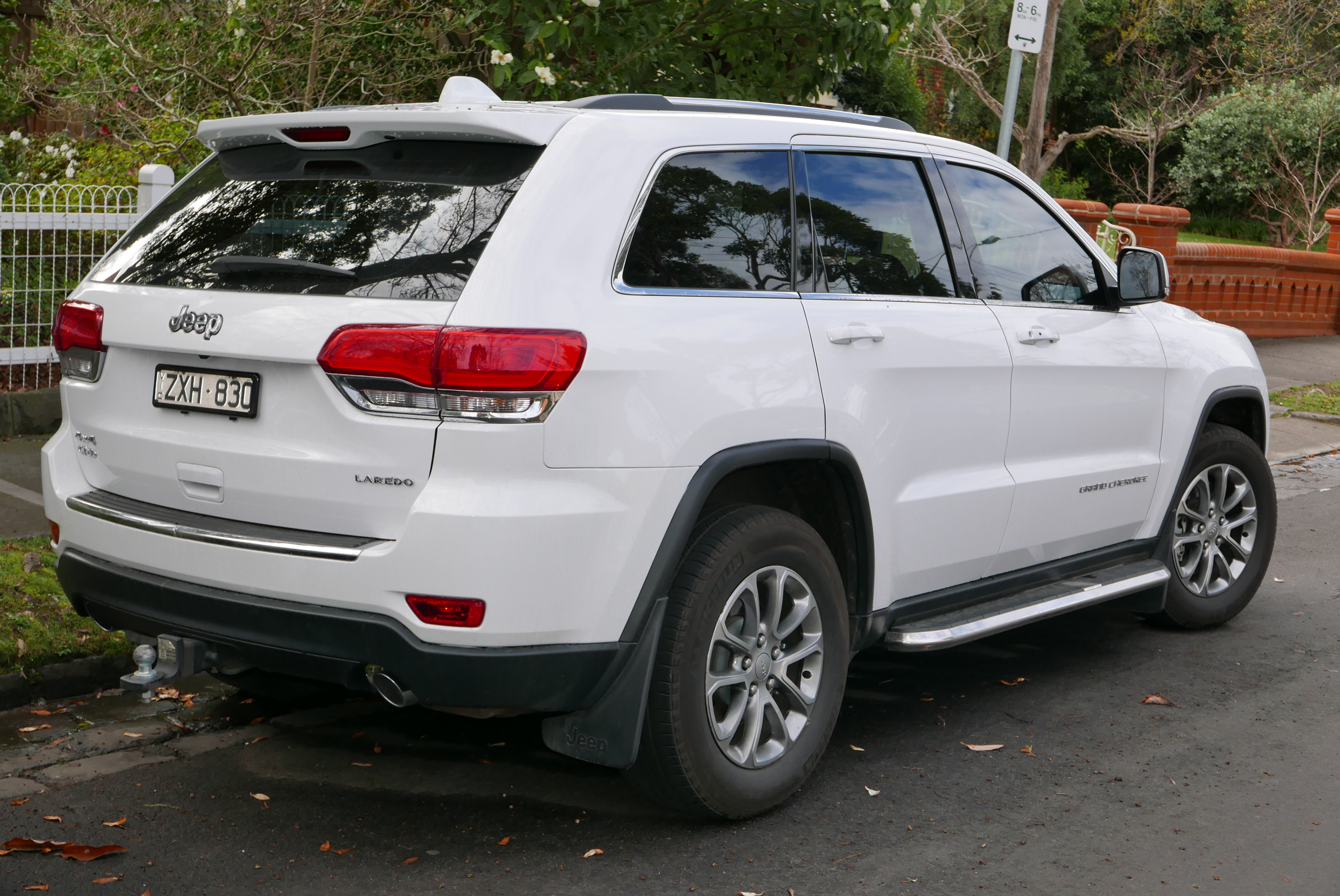
2014 model year update

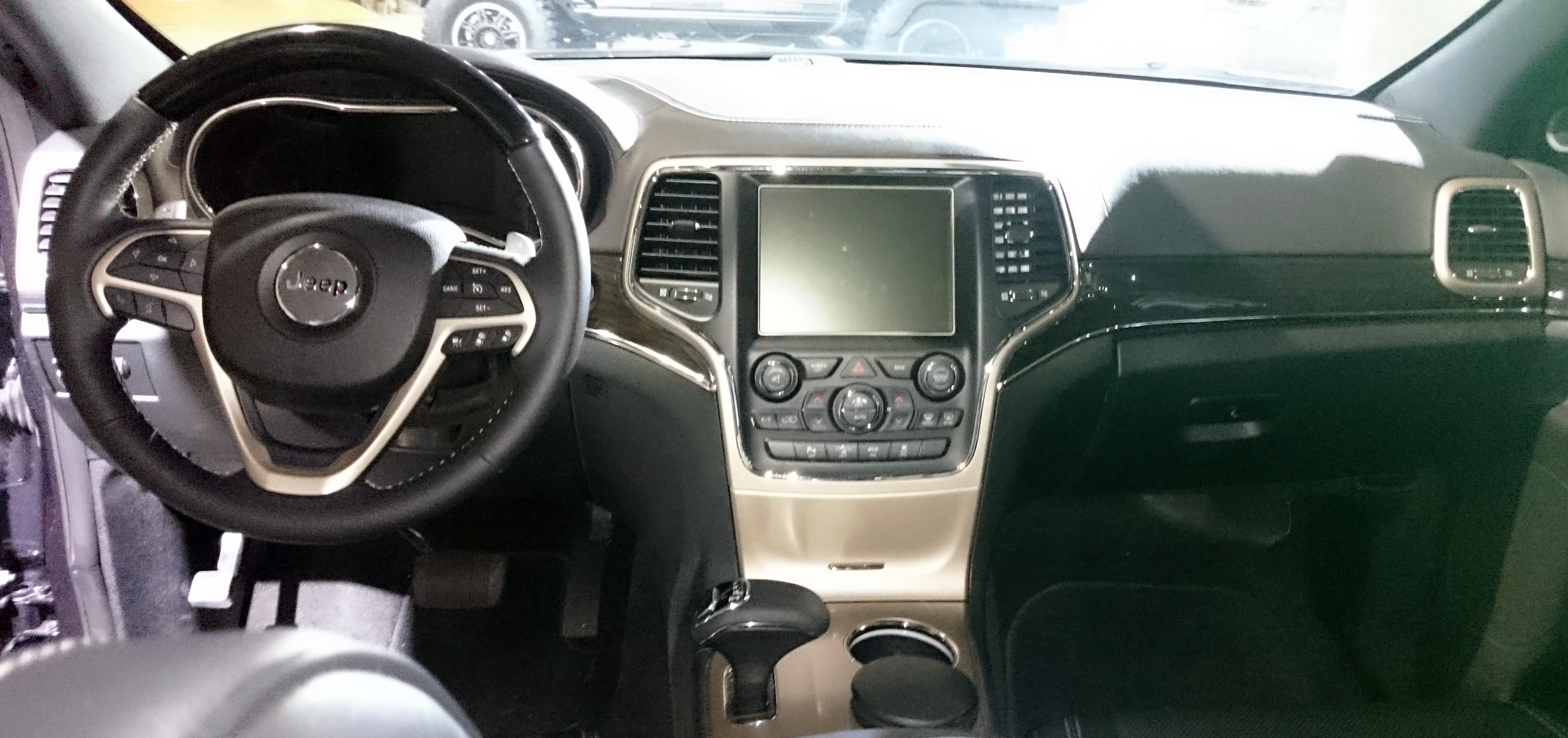
Interior (Italy; facelift)

On January 14, 2013, Jeep unveiled a revised WK2 Grand Cherokee at the North American International Auto Show at Cobo Center, along with a revised 2014 Jeep Compass and Jeep Patriot. The new Grand Cherokee offered a 3.0 L DOHC V6 diesel engine that gets up to 30 MPG, a 3.6 L Pentastar V6 engine that gets up to 24 MPG and has 290 hp (216 kW), a 5.7 L Hemi V8 engine that gets up to 21 MPG and has 360 hp (268 kW), and the 6.4 L Hemi engine produces 470 hp (350 kW) (SRT only). The models are the Laredo, the Limited, the Overland, and the Overland Summit Edition model has been renamed Summit. A new front end with a revised body-colored grille, new, smaller headlamps, and new tail lamps round out the exterior changes. The silver bezel on the back was removed. The opening rear tailgate window of previous models has been replaced with fixed glass. There are also new seventeen, eighteen, and twenty-inch wheel and tire choices. The SRT8 model will continue to be offered, but as an "SRT" and not an "SRT8" badged model, and for the first time will offer details like blacked-out head and tail lamps. Inside, the Summit model receives the SRT's nineteen-speaker Harman/Kardon surround sound system, all Grand Cherokees receive a new steering wheel with paddle shifters standard in every model, an eight-speed TorqueFlite 8 automatic transmission, and an 8.4-inch touch screen display with Garmin navigation software, an optional CD player, and the U Connect Access System first introduced in 2013 Ram 1500. A U Connect 5.0 touch-screen radio will also be available with an optional CD player. The Selec-Terrain System receives multiple upgrades on four-wheel-drive Grand Cherokees. New exterior colors, interior fabrics and materials, and interior colors become available.

For 2014, "SRT8" was no longer a model of Jeep, but a separate corporate entity. The "8" designation was dropped in the "SRT" line for this year, the Grand Cherokee being referred to as an "SRT Jeep Grand Cherokee." The SRT model received many features. For example, in the interior, it received a steering wheel with the SRT insignia, twenty-inch alloy wheels, "performance" tires, and additional SRT-only details, including:

- 6.4 L V8, 470 hp (350 kW)/465 lb⋅ft (630 N⋅m), capable of 0-60 mph (97 km/h) in 4.5 seconds
- Six-piston Brembo brakes at the front and four-piston Brembo brakes at the rear
- 3-season tires (optional)
- SRT-only "performance pages" in the head unit, displaying engine statistics, quarter mile/0-60 mph, and other metrics
- Nappa leather seats with SRT-only Alcantara inserts and headliner
- Fascia covering hitch (if so provisioned)
- Suspension modes, including track mode
- "Launch" mode, designed to model professional driver techniques
- Upgraded software for transmission, with over 90 gear shift programs

=== 2015 ===
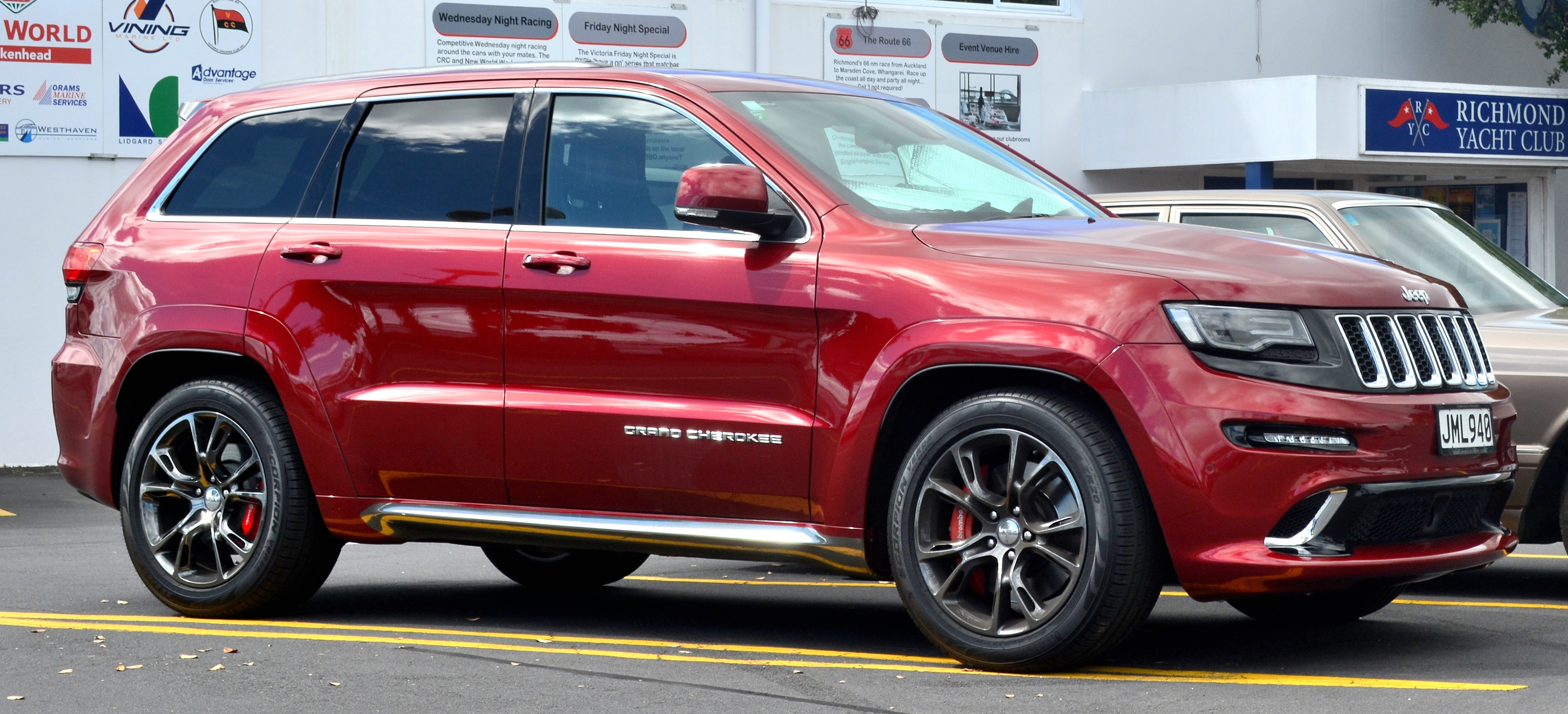
2015 Jeep Grand Cherokee SRT

The 2015 Limited Edition model no longer has dual exhausts. This feature only comes in the Overland and up editions. There are no other major changes for the 2015 model year. However, the Limited, Summit, and Overland trims will include HD Radio as part of the U Connect feature. The SRT receives a modest 5 hp (4 kW) bump, in part due to a reflash of the PCM.

=== 2017 ===
At the 2016 New York International Auto Show, Jeep announced new updates for the Grand Cherokee, which included two new trim levels:

The Trailhawk trim level is the "off-road" oriented trim level, which made its initial appearance in 2013, returned for 2017. It includes a Quadra-Drive II four-wheel-drive system along with a Quadra-Lift air suspension system, the Selec-Speed control, and Hill Descent Control. It will offer the same seven-slot front grille that was first offered on the 2016 Grand Cherokee Laredo and Limited 75th Anniversary Edition models, red-painted front-mounted tow hooks, standard eighteen-inch and optional twenty-inch alloy wheels, special off-road tires with Kevlar belts, Neutral Gray-painted exterior accents and badges, optional Mopar side rock rails, a standard U Connect 8.4-inch touch-screen infotainment system, red accent stitching throughout the interior, a 'Trailhawk' emblem on the steering wheel, brushed Piano black interior trim panels, and gunmetal finished interior components.

The Summit trim level is the "upscale" version of the Grand Cherokee, which was revamped in 2014 and was revamped again for 2017. It offers a restyled front grille with LED front fog lamps and twenty-inch polished alloy wheels. Its features include a cross-stitched leather-trimmed interior, Active Noise Cancellation, an acoustic windshield and front side glass, leather-trimmed dashboard and door panel inserts, a nineteen-speaker, 825-watt Harman Kardon surround-sound system, automatically folding power side-view mirrors, a suede-trimmed headliner, a blind-spot monitoring system, lane departure warning, parallel and perpendicular park assist systems, Berber carpeting, and other interior appointments.

New exterior paint color options include Rhino, Diamond Black Crystal Pearl Coat, Light Brown Stone, True Blue, and Ivory Pearl Coat (availability varies by trim level).

All 2017 models received a second facelift that features new alloy wheel designs, reshaped headlights, and a reshaped grille. The new grille and headlights come from the 75th Anniversary Edition models of 2016, however, without the bronze-painted accents. In addition, all models receive a new 'GRAND CHEROKEE' emblem for the front doors.

The 75th Anniversary Edition models, based on the base Laredo and mid-level Limited, continued for 2017.

The SRT trim for 2017 featured a new front fascia and a new interior.

=== 2018 ===
Changes to the 2018 Jeep Grand Cherokee lineup (aside from the SRT Trackhawk model) include:

- Standard seven-inch infotainment system with Apple CarPlay and Android Auto (Laredo, Laredo "E", and Limited models, replaces the previously standard five-inch color touch-screen radio)
- All models receive the 4C latest-generation infotainment systems with Apple CarPlay and Android Auto
- 8.4-inch infotainment system without GPS navigation is discontinued as an option
- 75th Anniversary Edition models of the Laredo "E" and Limited are discontinued
- Laredo and Laredo "E" get new seventeen-inch aluminum-alloy wheels and a new cloth seating style as standard equipment
- The eighteen-inch aluminum-alloy wheel available in the 18-inch wheel and 8.4-inch Radio Package for the Laredo "E" is redesigned
- The 3.0 L EcoDiesel Turbocharged Diesel V6 engine option returns (re-certified) for the Limited, Trailhawk, Overland, and Summit (late availability)
- The SRT 392 gets new twenty-inch "Carbon Fiber Monkey" aluminum-alloy wheels as standard equipment
- Summit, SRT 392, and SRT Trackhawk get an interior trim package
- Active Noise Cancelling is now included on all audio systems but the standard six-speaker audio system
- Second-generation 850RE automatic transmission replaces the previous 845RE automatic transmission (4X4 Models with 3.6 L Pentastar VVT V6 engine)
- Jeep Brown and Summit Gray interior color options become available for the Summit
- The Sterling Edition Package, celebrating the 25th Anniversary of the Jeep Grand Cherokee, is available on Limited
- High Altitude Edition model, based on Overland, returns for 2018

The "base" U Connect 7.0 Infotainment System includes:

- AM/FM radio
- Two (2) USB inputs (both syncing)
- Apple CarPlay and Android Auto connectivity
- Bluetooth with stereo audio streaming
- 3.5-millimeter auxiliary audio input jack
- Voice control
- "Park View" rearview backup camera
- Seven-inch color touch-screen display
- Standard on Laredo, Laredo "E", and Limited

The "upgraded" U Connect 8.4 Infotainment System with GPS Navigation includes all of the existing features of the U Connect 7.0 Infotainment System, but also adds the following features:

- AM/FM radio with HD Radio
- SiriusXM satellite radio with a 1-year subscription
- SiriusXM Travel Link with a 1-year subscription
- U Connect Guardian Services (Provided by SiriusXM) with trial subscription (Including 9-1-1 emergency call and roadside assistance call buttons)
- 4G LTE mobile Wi-Fi capabilities (Provided by AT&T Wireless) with trial subscription
- U Connect apps
- GPS navigation by Garmin
- 8.4-inch color touch-screen display
- Standard on Altitude, Trailhawk, Sterling Edition, Overland, High Altitude, Summit, SRT, and SRT Trackhawk
- Optional on Laredo "E" (Requires 18-inch wheel and 8.4 radio group) and Limited

Both radios include the option to add a single-disc, center console-mounted CD/MP3 player, and some trim levels equipped with the 8.4-inch radio can also be equipped with a rear-seat DVD and Blu-ray entertainment systems with dual screens, HDMI input, and independent CD/MP3/DVD/Blu-ray players, with two pairs of wireless headphones also included in the package. On Limited, Trailhawk, and Sterling Edition models, the Luxury Group is required to have the rear-seat entertainment system option. The option can be selected independently of all other trim levels.

A six-speaker, non-amplified audio system is standard on Laredo, Laredo "E", Altitude, and Limited models. A nine-speaker, 506-watt Alpine amplified surround-sound audio system is included on Trailhawk, Sterling Edition, Overland, High Altitude, SRT, and SRT Trackhawk models, and is optional on Altitude, Limited, and Summit models. An eighteen-speaker, 825-watt Harman Kardon amplified surround-sound audio system comes standard on the Summit model, and is optional on Overland, SRT, and SRT Trackhawk models.

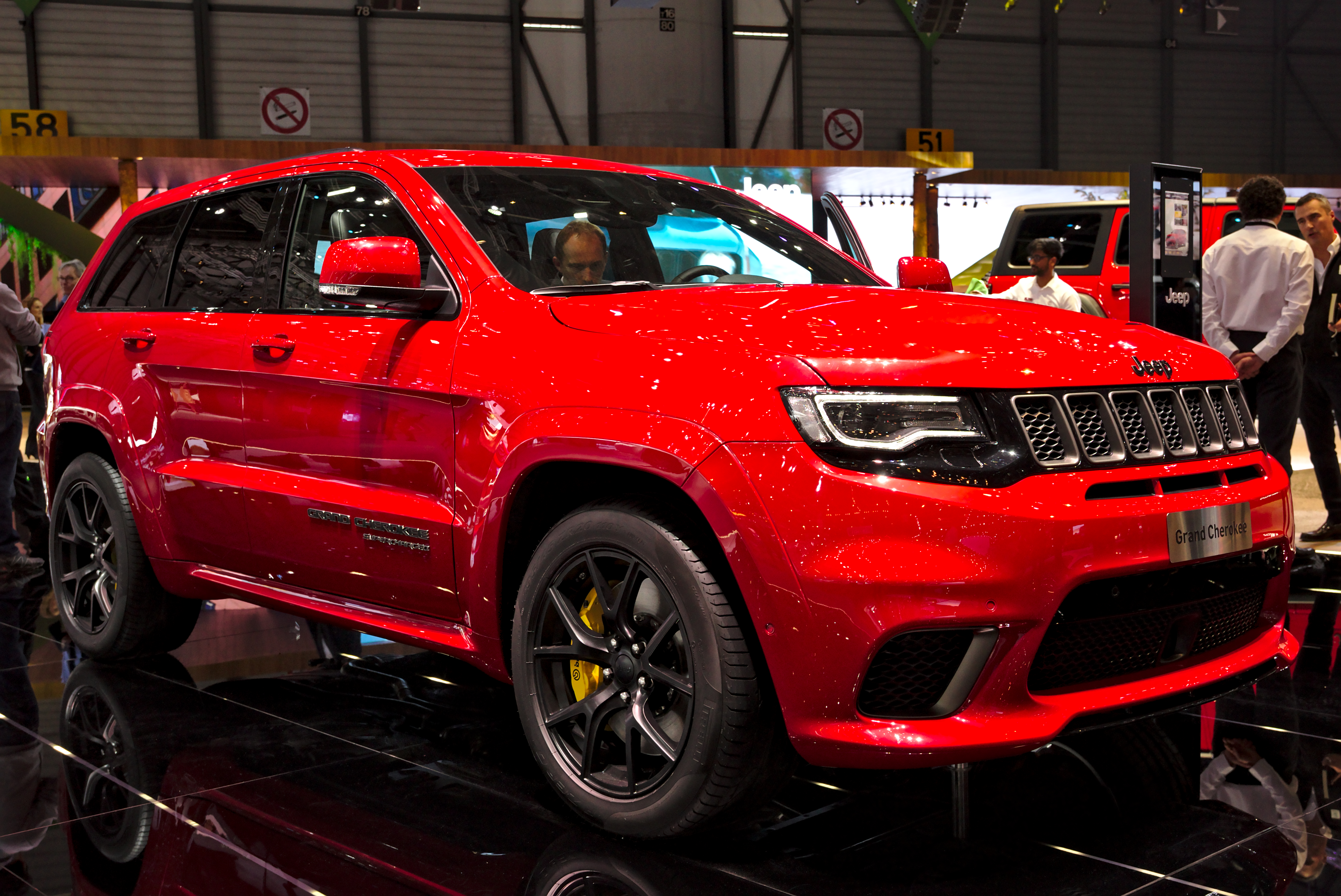
Jeep Grand Cherokee SRT Trackhawk

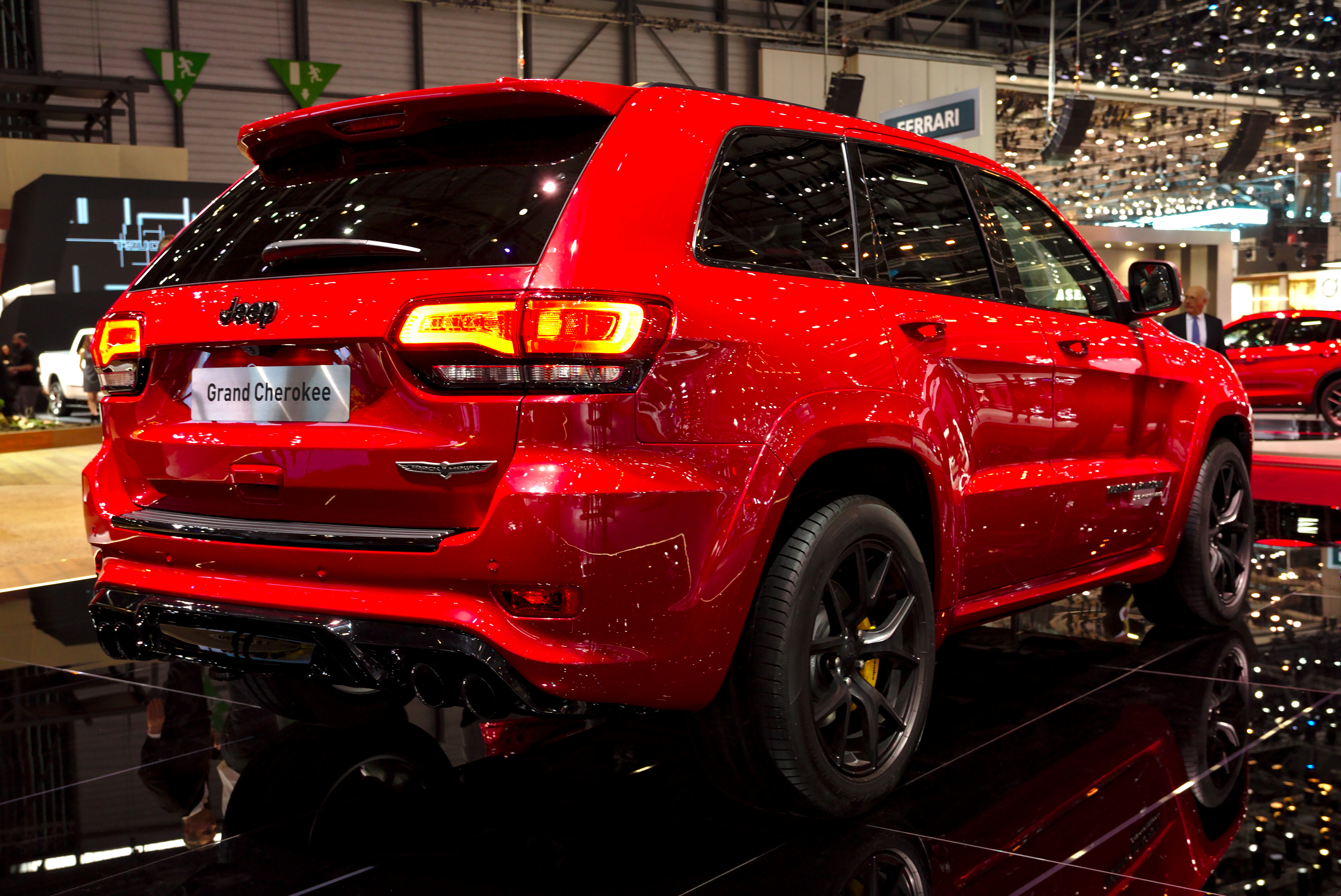
Rear view

=== SRT Trackhawk ===
Jeep introduced the 2018 Jeep Grand Cherokee SRT Trackhawk at the 2017 New York International Auto Show. The SRT Trackhawk is the highest-performance Grand Cherokee model to date.

Specifications

- 6.2 L Hellcat HEMI V8, 707 hp (527 kW; 717 PS) at 6,000 rpm and 645 lb⋅ft (875 N⋅m) of torque at 4,800 rpm
- Requires 91-octane unleaded fuel
- Eight-speed ZF automatic transmission with steering-wheel-mounted shift paddles
- Flat-bottomed steering wheel
- Five-passenger seating capacity
- All-wheel drive (AWD)
- 6,200 rpm redline
- Laguna leather interior with carbon fiber trim
- Brembo brake system (6-piston front and 4-piston rear calipers)
- 55/45 weight distribution (estimated)
- 5,363 lb (2,433 kg) curb weight (estimated)
- 6,600 lb (2,994 kg) gross vehicle weight rating (GVWR) (estimated)
- 1,350 lb (612 kg) payload (estimated)
- Standard 20" x 10" polished forged aluminum wheels with "Titanium II"-painted pockets and satin-chrome wheel center caps
- Optional 20" x 10" loss-gloss black lightweight aluminum wheels with black wheel center caps
- Standard P295/45ZR20 Pirelli Scorpion Verde runflat all-season tires
- Optional P295/45ZR20 Pirelli P-Zero run-flat 3-season tires
- 3.70 rear axle ratio
- 7,200 lb (3,266 kg) maximum towing capacity

=== 2019 ===
Largely unchanged from 2018, the 2019 model year Grand Cherokee received only a few minor changes. The 25th Anniversary Sterling Edition model is now discontinued, though its aluminum-alloy wheel design is now standard on the Overland trim, and optional on the midlevel Limited trim. Laredo, Laredo E, Upland (now available with two-wheel-drive), Altitude, Limited, Trailhawk, Overland, High Altitude, Summit, SRT 392, and SRT Trackhawk models continue for 2019. The 8.4 touchscreen is updated to a high-definition "Dissociated" display for the 2019 model year.

A new Limited X Package adds SRT-inspired styling cues to the mid-level Limited trim. The Overland and Summit trims gain new aluminum-alloy wheel designs.

The mid-level Limited trim receives a standard U Connect 4C 8.4 infotainment system with Garmin GPS navigation, which was previously available as an extra-cost option, leaving only the base Laredo, Laredo E, and Upland trims with the base U Connect 4 7.0 infotainment system as standard equipment. In addition, the U Connect 4C 8.4 infotainment system with Garmin GPS navigation receives a new 8.4-inch, high-definition "Dissociated" touchscreen display, which was first introduced on the 2017 Chrysler Pacifica minivan.

Blind Spot Detection System (BLIS) and Forward Collision Warning System (FCWS), previously extra-cost options available as part of a package on top-level trims of the Grand Cherokee, are now standard equipment on all Grand Cherokee trim levels.

Three new exterior colors, Green Metallic, Sting Gray, and Slate Blue, were offered for 2019. A new interior color scheme, Black and Bridle Brown, was also added for the Summit trim level, and both Trailhawk and Overland trims receive new Piano Black interior trim accents.

Trim levels that continue for 2019 are Laredo, Laredo E, Upland, Altitude, Limited, Trailhawk, Overland, High Altitude, Summit, SRT, and SRT Trackhawk, with Limited X being new for 2019.

=== Grand Cherokee WK (2022) ===
For 2022, Jeep marketed the outgoing Grand Cherokee WK2 alongside the all-new Grand Cherokee WL model as the "Grand Cherokee WK" (not to be confused with the Grand Cherokee (WK), which was produced from 2005 until 2010). The lineup is condensed to base Laredo "E", mid-level Laredo "X", and range-topping Limited trims, with only the 3.6 L Pentastar V6 gasoline engine. However, in addition to the Stellantis-produced (but ZF derived) 850RE 8-speed automatic transmission, the ZF-produced 8HP75 eight-speed automatic transmission, built in Germany and previously only available with the 5.7 L HEMI V8 gasoline engine, will also be offered as at no additional cost on all models.

== Production ==
In 2009, the company announced a US$1.8 billion, 285,000-square-foot (26,477 m^{2}) expansion of its Jefferson North Assembly plant in Detroit to allow flexible manufacture of the next-generation model, as well as the 2011+ Dodge Durango off the same platform that was developed jointly with Mercedes (ML Chassis).

== Safety ==
=== ANCAP ===
ANCAP test results Jeep Grand Cherokee diesel variants only (2011)
Test	Score
Overall	4 /5 stars
Frontal offset	9.95/16
Side impact	16/16
Pole	2/2
Seat belt reminders	2/3
Whiplash protection	Not Assessed
Pedestrian protection	Marginal
Electronic stability control	Standard

ANCAP test results Jeep Grand Cherokee V6 variants (2014)
Test	Score
Overall	5 /5 stars
Frontal offset	14.90/16
Side impact	16/16
Pole	2/2
Seat belt reminders	2/3
Whiplash protection	Good
Pedestrian protection	Marginal
Electronic stability control	Standard

=== Euro NCAP ===
Euro NCAP test results Jeep Grand Cherokee (2011)
Test	Points	%
Overall:	5 /5 stars	
Adult occupant:	29	81%
Child occupant:	34	69%
Pedestrian:	16	45%
Safety assist:	5	71%

=== Insurance Institute for Highway Safety (IIHS) ===
==== 2013 ====
2013 Grand Cherokee IIHS scores
Small overlap frontal offset (driver)	Marginal* (Jan 2013–2021)
Small overlap frontal offset (passenger)	Poor* (Jan 2013–2021)
Moderate overlap frontal offset	Good
Side impact	Good
Roof strength	Good

^{*vehicle structure rated "Marginal"}

==== 2022 ====
The 2022 Grand Cherokee WK was safety tested by the IIHS:

IIHS Grand Cherokee WK scores (2022):
Small overlap front (Driver)	Marginal	
Small overlap front (Passenger)	Poor	
Moderate overlap front	Good	
Side (original test)	Good	
Roof strength	Good	
Head restraints and seats	Good	
Headlights	Acceptable / Poor	varies by trim/option
Front crash prevention (Vehicle-to-Vehicle)	Superior	optional
Child seat anchors (LATCH) ease of use	Marginal	

=== NHTSA ===
NHTSA 2017 Grand Cherokee:
Overall:	4WD
Overall:	RWD
Frontal Driver:	5/5 stars
Frontal Passenger:	5/5 stars
Side Driver:	5/5 stars
Side Passenger:	5/5 stars
Side Pole Driver:	5/5 stars
Rollover:	/ 16.9% (4WD)
Rollover:	/ 20.4% (RWD)

== Awards ==
=== 2011 ===
- AutoWeek: Best of the Best 2011 Truck
- Car and Driver: 2011 Editors' Choice Awards/Mid-size SUVs
- Car and Driver: Best Performer – Interior Sound Level
- Top Safety Pick for 2011 from the IIHS
- Consumers Digest Best Buy for 2011
- Safest SUV in America by MSN Autos
