= Jeep Grand Cherokee (WK) =

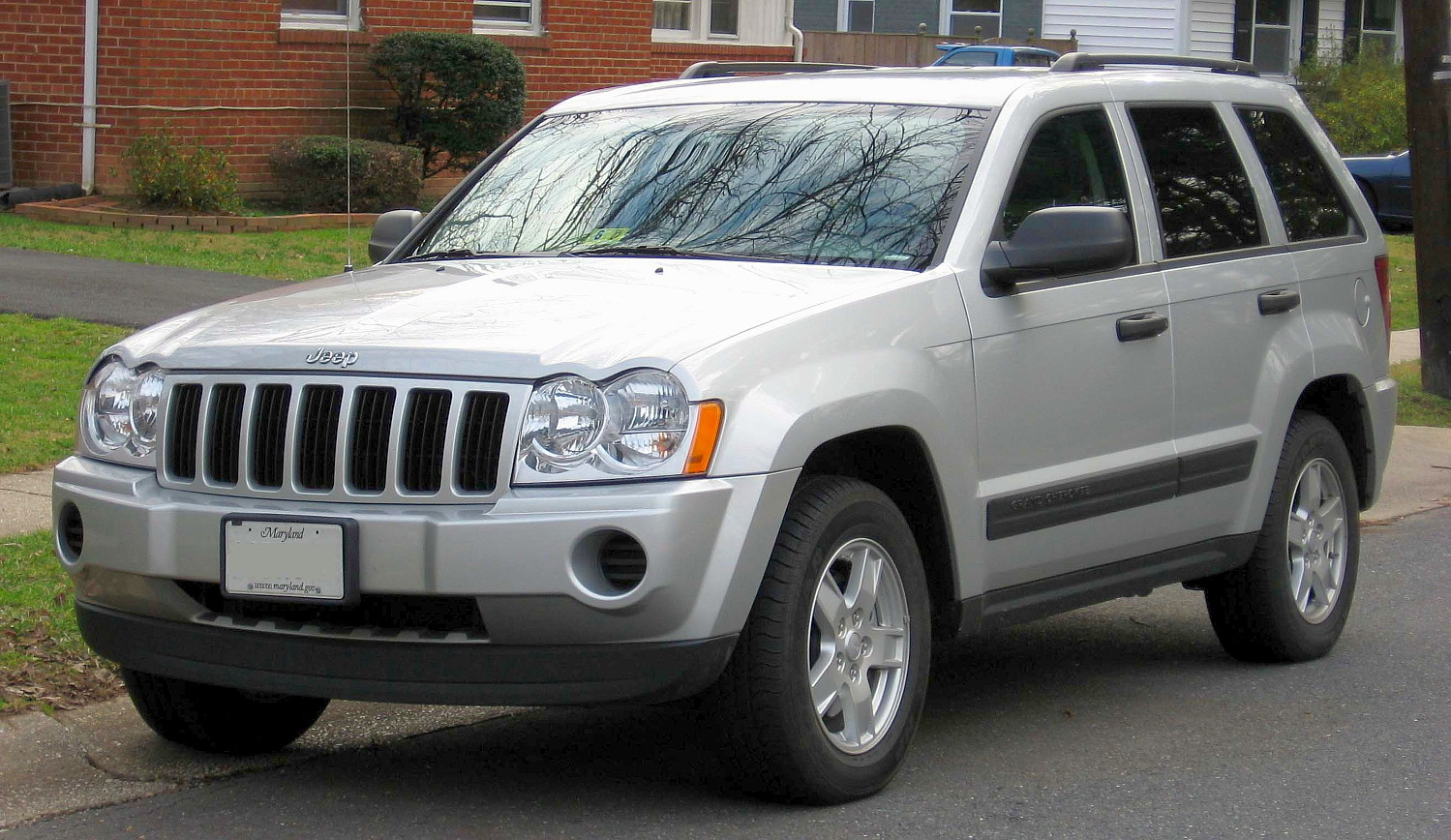

Overview
- Manufacturer: Jeep (Note: DaimlerChrysler (2005–2007) Chrysler LLC (2007–2009) Chrysler Group LLC (2009–2010))
- Production: July 2004 – March 2010
- Model years: 2005–2010
- Assembly: United States: Detroit, Michigan; Austria: Graz (Magna Steyr); Venezuela: Valencia (Carabobo Assembly)
- Designer: Mark T. Allen (2001)

Body and chassis
- Class: Mid-size SUV
- Body style: 5-door SUV
- Layout: Front-engine, rear-wheel drive or four-wheel drive
- Platform: Chrysler WK/WK2
- Related: Jeep Liberty/Cherokee; Jeep Commander; Dodge Nitro; Jeep Wrangler

Powertrain
- Engine: 3.7 L PowerTech EKG V6 Complete engine specs: •Displacement:226.0 CID (3,701 cc); •Stroke: 3.57 in (91 mm); •Bore: 3.66 in (93 mm); •Power: 210 hp (160 kW); •Torque: 235 lb⋅ft (319 N⋅m); •Fuel Type: Gas; •Fuel Economy (Combined): 17 mpg_{‑US} (14 L/100 km; 20 mpg_{‑imp}); 4.7 L PowerTech V8 Complete engine specs: •Displacement:287.0 CID (4,703 cc); •Stroke: 3.40 in (86 mm); •Bore: 3.66 in (93 mm); •Power: 305 hp (227 kW); •Torque: 334 lb⋅ft (453 N⋅m); •Fuel Type: Gas/E85; •Fuel Economy (Combined): 14 mpg_{‑US} (17 L/100 km; 17 mpg_{‑imp}); 5.7 L Hemi V8 Complete engine specs: •Displacement:345.0 CID (5,654 cc); •Stroke: 3.58 in (91 mm); •Bore: 3.92 in (100 mm); •Power: 330 hp (250 kW); •Torque: 375 lb⋅ft (508 N⋅m); •Fuel Type: Gas; •Fuel Economy (Combined): 14 mpg_{‑US} (17 L/100 km; 17 mpg_{‑imp}); 6.1 L Hemi V8 (SRT-8) Complete engine specs: •Displacement:370.0 CID (6,059 cc); •Stroke: 3.58 in (91 mm); •Bore: 4.05 in (103 mm); •Power: 425 hp (317 kW); •Torque: 420 lb⋅ft (570 N⋅m); •Fuel Type: Gas; •Fuel Economy (Combined): 12 mpg_{‑US} (20 L/100 km; 14 mpg_{‑imp}); 3.0 L Mercedes-Benz OM642 V6 CRD Complete engine specs: •Displacement:182 CID (2,987 cc); •Stroke: 3.62 in (92 mm); •Bore: 3.27 in (83 mm); •Power: 215 hp (160 kW) @3800 rpm; •Torque: 376 lb⋅ft (510 N⋅m); •Fuel Type: Diesel; •Fuel Economy (Combined):18.34 mpg_{‑US} (12.83 L/100 km; 22.03 mpg_{‑imp})
- Transmission: 5-speed 545RFE automatic 5-speed W5A580 automatic

Dimensions
- Wheelbase: 109.5 in (2,781 mm)
- Length: 186.6 in (4,740 mm); 2006–10 SRT-8: 186.6in (4,740mm)
- Width: 73.3 in (1,862 mm) (body); 84.3 in (2,141 mm) (with mirrors)
- Height: 2005–07: 67.7 in (1,720 mm); 2008–2010: 68.7 in (1,745 mm); 2008–2010 SRT8: 66.7 in (1,694 mm)
- Curb weight: 2005 Euro 3.0 CRD (Diesel) 2,210 kg (4,872 lb) Limited 4WD 5.7 L: 4,735 lb (2,148 kg) NOTE: 2WD not available in Europe & UK

Chronology
- Predecessor: Grand Cherokee (WJ)
- Successor: Grand Cherokee (WK2)

The third-generation Jeep Grand Cherokee (WK) is a mid-size SUV that was manufactured and marketed by Jeep from the 2005 to the 2010 model years. It was unveiled at the 2004 New York International Auto Show and subsequently in Europe at Euro Camp Jeep in Ardèche, France.

Major features included Quadra-Drive II four-wheel drive, rear-seat DVD player, and optional 5.7 L Hemi V8 engine. The 3.7 L V6 engine replaced the 4.0 L straight-6 engine. Notably, the WK featured independent front suspension.

In 2008, the WK received a minor facelift with revised headlights and high-intensity discharge (HID) Headlamps with auto-leveling. The lower portion of the front bumper became removable to increase the approach angle for off-road use. The 4.7 L was refined, now producing 305 hp (227 kW; 309 PS), and 334 lb⋅ft (453 N⋅m).

The 2009 Jeep Grand Cherokee was available with an improved 5.7 L Hemi engine rated at 360 hp (268 kW; 365 PS) and 390 lb⋅ft (529 N⋅m) of torque. The engine uses variable valve timing to increase fuel economy.

== Models ==
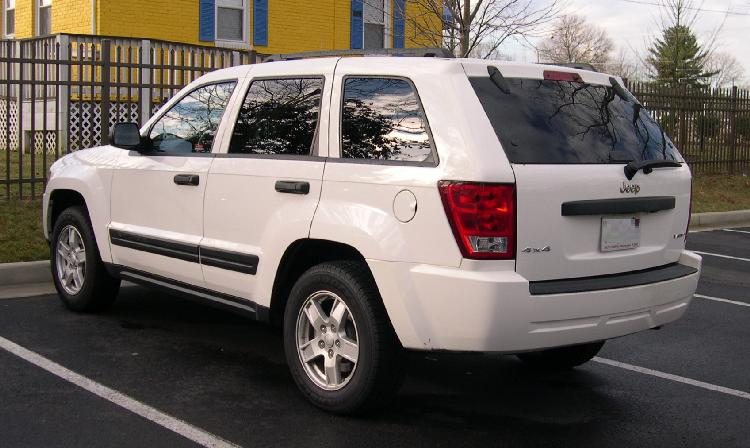
2005 Jeep Grand Cherokee

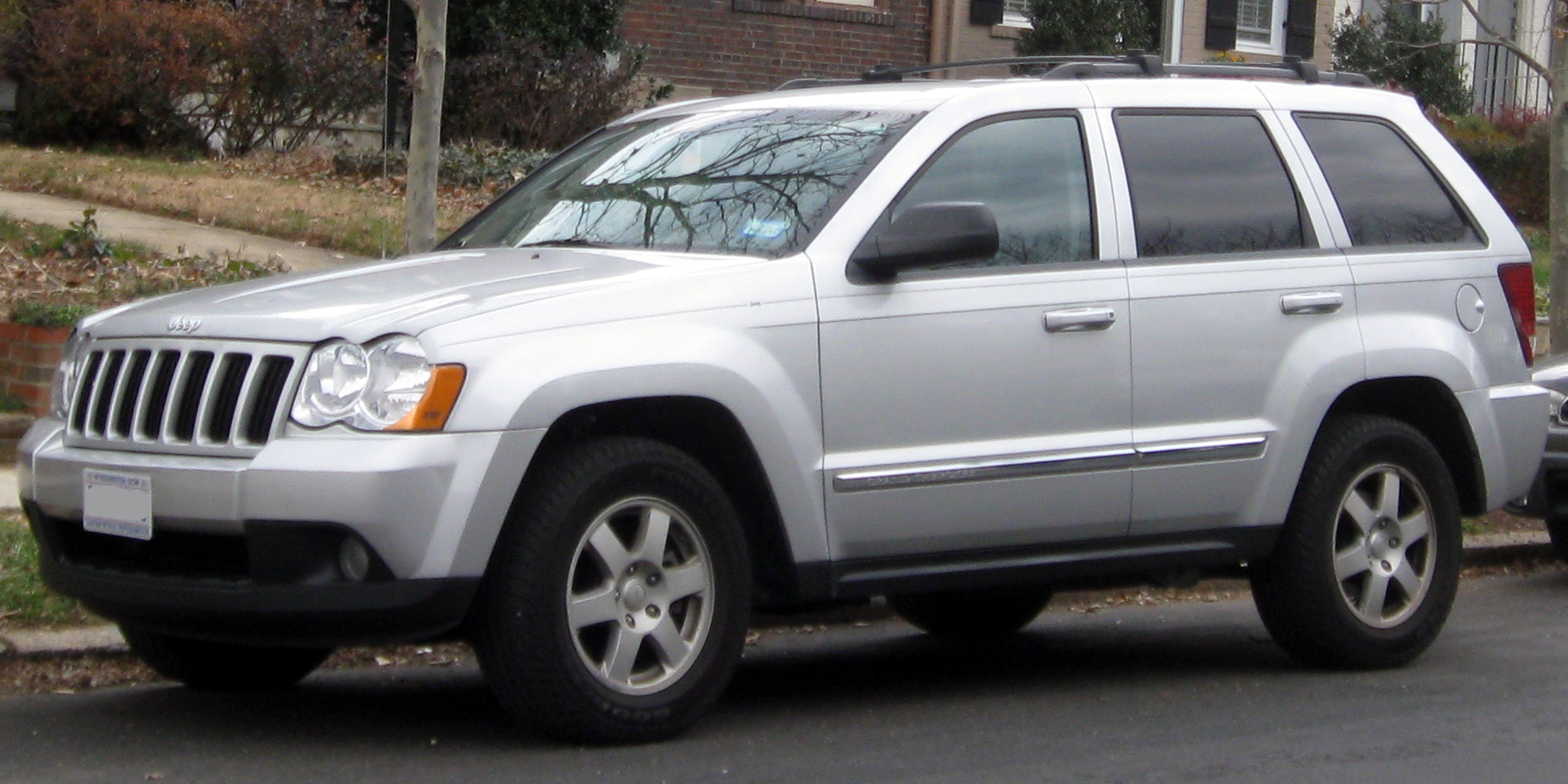
2008 Jeep Grand Cherokee

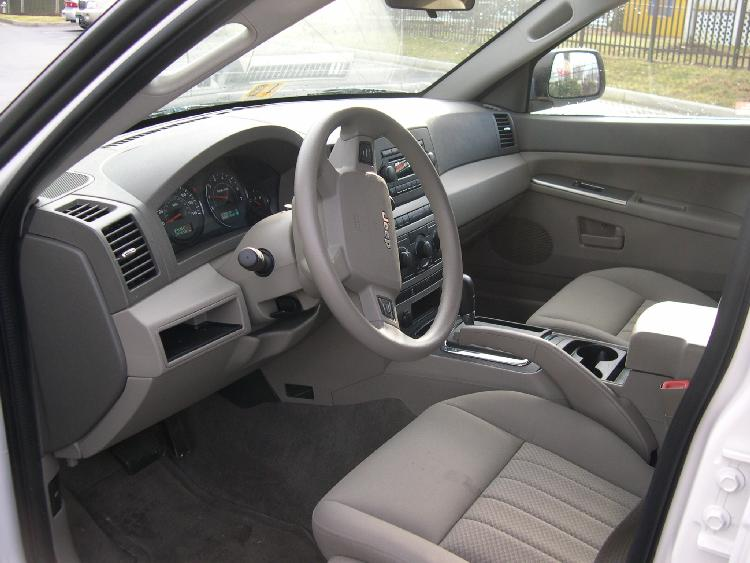
Interior

- 2005–2010 – Laredo (not in Europe)
- 2005–2010 – CRD (Europe)
- 2005–2010 – Limited
- 2006–2009 – Overland
- 2006–2010 – SRT8
- 2007–2008 – CRD (NAFTA)

The Laredo was the base trim level of the Grand Cherokee between September 19, 2004, and 2010. Standard features included: the 3.7L Power-Tech V6 engine with 5-speed automatic transmission, seventeen-inch (17") alloy wheels, a full-sized spare tire and spare wheel, cloth seating surfaces, a 6-way power front driver's seat, an AM/FM stereo with CD player (and later, an auxiliary audio input jack), 6 speakers, black body-side inserts and front and rear bumper inserts (both chrome in 2010), remote steering wheel-mounted audio system controls, a driver's information center (VIC), keyless entry, and more. Many features available on the luxurious Limited trim were also available on the base Laredo trim level.

The Limited added these features to the base Laredo trim: a full-sized matching spare wheel, dual power front bucket seats, premium leather seating surfaces, an AM/FM stereo with six-disc CD/MP3 changer, a premium 276-watt Boston Acoustics sound system with 6 speakers, heated front bucket seats, a leather-wrapped steering wheel, chrome body-side inserts and front and rear bumper inserts, driver's 2-position memory, a rear-mounted fold-down center console, and more. The standard engine between 2005 and 2009 was the 4.7L Power-Tech V8 engine, while the standard engine in 2010 was the 3.7L Power-Tech V6 engine.

The Rocky Mountain and 65th Anniversary Edition were "value-added" trim levels of the Grand Cherokee for model years 2005, 2007, 2008, and 2009 (Rocky Mountain) and 2006 (65th Anniversary Edition). These trim levels added the following features to the base Laredo trim: power driver's bucket seat, unique cloth seating surfaces with special embroidery, embroidered carpeted floor mats, chrome body-side inserts, an AM-FM stereo with six-disc CD/MP3 changer, a premium 276-watt Boston Acoustics sound system with 6 speakers, special emblems on both front doors, special seventeen-inch (17") alloy wheels, a full-size spare, fog lights, and power double-function sunroof.

The S Limited added these features to the Limited trim: unique alloy wheels, "S" emblems on both front doors, the 5.7L HEMI V8 engine, unique premium perforated leather-and-suede seating surfaces, a GPS navigational system stereo, and more.

The Overland was the top-of-the-line trim level of the Grand Cherokee between 2006 and 2009. It added these features to the Limited trim: seventeen-inch (17") (2005–2007) or eighteen-inch (18") chrome-clad alloy wheels (these wheels could be downgraded to seventeen-inch (17") alloy wheels from 2007 to 2009), a GPS navigational system radio, Bluetooth with voice command for phone, 'Overland' badges on the tailgate, the 5.7L HEMI V8 engine, side airbags, leather-and-suede seating surfaces with 'Overland' embroidery, a sunroof, and more. The Overland took a hiatus for MY 2010, returning on the next-generation WK2 Grand Cherokee in model year 2011.

The SRT8 was the "performance-oriented" Grand Cherokee trim level from December 20, 2005, to 2010. It added these features to the Limited trim: twenty-inch (20x9 front & 20x10 rear—U.S. spec; Four 20x8 Euro spec) polished "Alcoa" forged aluminum alloy wheels, twenty-inch (20") Good Year Eagle F1 performance tires (Goodyear Eagle RS-A EMT run flat tires: 255/45R20 front & 285/40 rear—U.S. Spec), leather-and-suede performance seating surfaces, a sunroof, a 6.1L HEMI V8 engine, mandatory 4X4, a body kit, a center-mounted dual exhaust system, 'SRT' emblems on both front doors and the tailgate, performance-tuned suspension, a special instrument cluster, carbon fiber interior trim, and more.

== Engines ==
Engines
Years	Engine	Power	Torque	Notes
2005–2010	3.7 L PowerTech V6	210 hp (157 kW)	235 lb⋅ft (319 N⋅m)	Laredo, Limited
2005–2007	4.7 L PowerTech V8	235 hp (175 kW)	290 lb⋅ft (393 N⋅m)	Laredo, Limited
2008–2009	4.7 L PowerTech V8	305 hp (227 kW)	334 lb⋅ft (453 N⋅m)	Laredo, Limited
2005–2008	5.7 L Hemi V8	330 hp (246 kW)	375 lb⋅ft (508 N⋅m)	Limited, Overland
2009–2010	5.7 L Hemi V8	360 hp (268 kW)	390 lb⋅ft (529 N⋅m)	Laredo, Limited, Overland
2006–2010	6.1 L Hemi V8	425 hp (317 kW)	420 lb⋅ft (569 N⋅m)	SRT8
2005- (2007–2008 in NA)	3.0 L OM642 Diesel V6	215 hp (160 kW)	376 lb⋅ft (510 N⋅m)	Laredo, Limited, Overland

== Notes ==
- The 4.7 L High Output engine that first appeared with the Grand Cherokee Overland WJ was dropped from the Jeep lineup. It was used in the Dodge Dakota and Dodge Ram 1500. The 4.7 L was revised in 2008, increasing horsepower and torque to 310 hp (231 kW; 314 PS) and 330 lb⋅ft (447 N⋅m) of torque. A dedicated High Output version was dropped as a result.
- The WK was known as a WH in international (i.e., non-US) markets.
- The 5.7 L HEMI engine for 2005-2008 has slightly less horsepower than those found in the Dodge Ram or the Dodge Charger (330 vs 345) due to different engine control unit (ECU) programming.
- The 5.7 L HEMI engine for 2009 and up was upgraded with Variable Cam Timing (VCT), adding 27 hp (20 kW; 27 PS) and 14 lb⋅ft (19 N⋅m) of torque.
- The 3.0 L diesel ceased production for North America at the end of 2008. The late production models with diesel engines are commonly referred to as 2008.5 models. They can not be stamped as 2009 models due to more restrictive diesel emissions standards.

== SRT8 ==
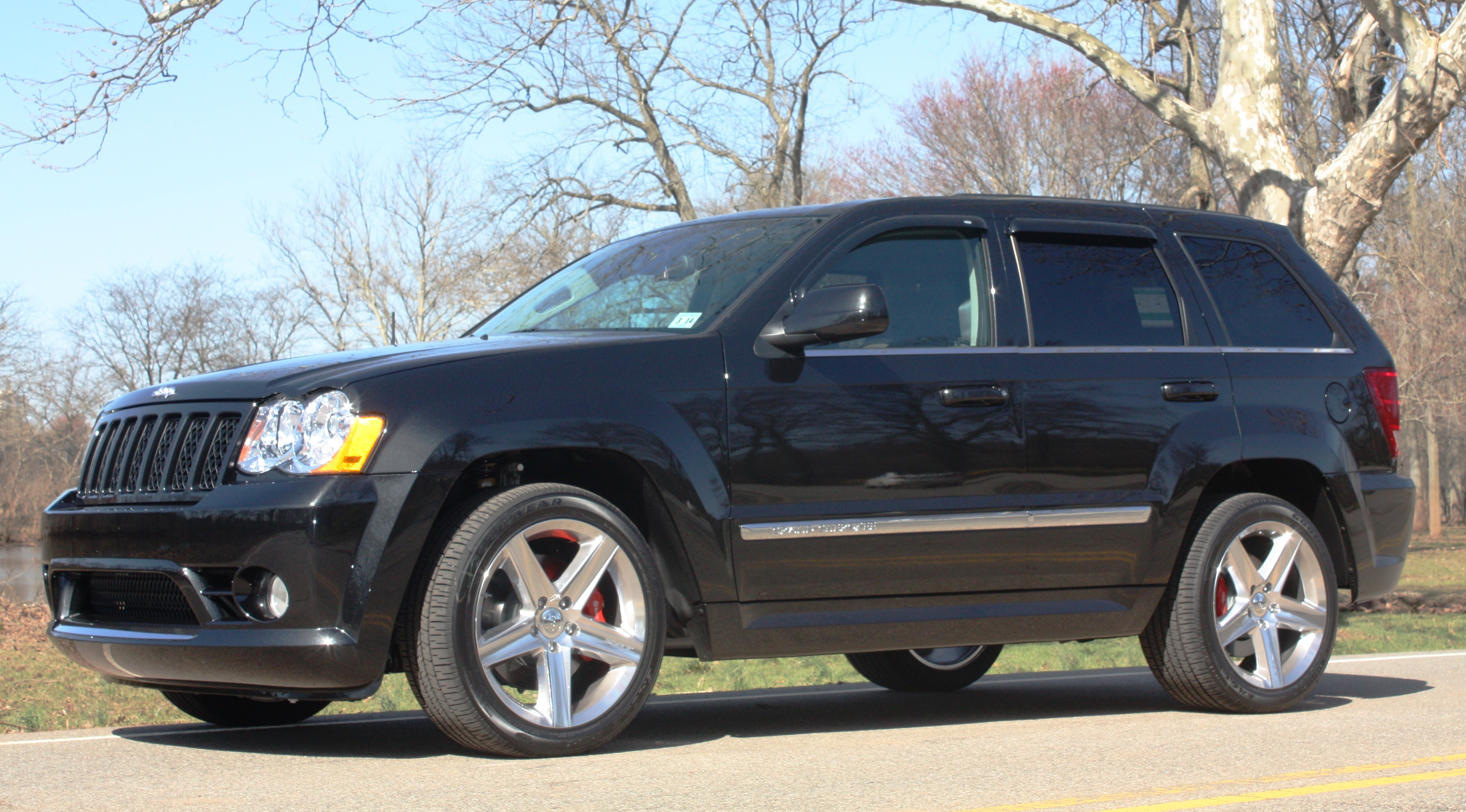
Jeep Grand Cherokee SRT8

An SRT8 (Street & Racing Technology V8) version of the Grand Cherokee debuted at the 2005 New York International Auto Show. It's powered by a 420 hp (313 kW) version of the 6.1 L Hemi, and also features upgraded Brembo brakes, large dual performance exhaust with polished tips (exiting out the middle of the rear), Bilstein performance gas charged shocks and modified suspension components, Mercedes-Benz NAG1 (WA580) 5-speed transmission, unique NV146 transfer case, specially designed electronic all-wheel-drive system and interior and exterior updates. A drive shaft from a diesel application, fortified Dana 44 rear differential, and 11.2" (285 mm) wide Goodyear tires in the rear (10" or 255 mm in the front) complement the performance package. The sports tuned suspension allows the Jeep SRT8 to develop 0.92 g on the skidpad.

A road test of the 2006 production model conducted by Road & Track yielded a 0 to 60 mph (97 km/h) time of 4.6 seconds and a quarter mile dragstrip of 13.2 seconds at 104.1 mph (167.5 km/h). Such numbers made the SRT8 Grand Cherokee the fastest accelerating vehicle within the SRT8 lineup, second only to the Dodge Viper SRT10 among all SRT vehicles. There is no electronic speed governor employed, leaving the top speed rev-limited (revving to redline in top gear) to 170 mph (274 km/h).

To improve on-road handling and decrease weight, off-road gear has been removed. The SRT8 uses an NV146 transfer case, which uses an electronically applied clutch pack to transfer 0-50% of torque to the front axle but has no low-range or manual controls. The front and rear differentials are both open, with no limited-slip capability. Its ride stance is significantly lower, and the front fascia spoiler gives the vehicle 7 inches (178 mm) of ground clearance. A total of 14,921 Jeep Grand Cherokee SRT8s were manufactured.

== Models ==
Laredo: The Laredo served as the entry-level Grand Cherokee model offering an AM/FM radio with single-disc CD player (later, an auxiliary audio input jack was also added), seventeen-inch alloy wheels, power windows, door locks, side mirrors, and driver's seat, lumbar support, keyless entry with security system, cloth seating surfaces, tinted windows, and six speakers. Features such as leather seating surfaces, heated front seats, side airbags, a Boston Acoustics premium sound system, a navigation system and a CD and MP3 changer, as well as a CD/MP3/Cassette combo could be added to further enhance this model.

Limited: Limited trim added an AM/FM radio with six-disc in-dash CD changer, a Boston Acoustics premium sound system, full-sized spare tire, and leather seating surfaces. Features such as a sunroof, heated front seats, and chrome wheels could also be added.

Overland: The Overland added Uconnect Hands-Free Bluetooth technology, a six-disc in-dash CD/MP3 changer with navigation system, satellite radio, leather and suede seats, heated front seats, a sunroof, and chrome wheels.

== Diesel ==
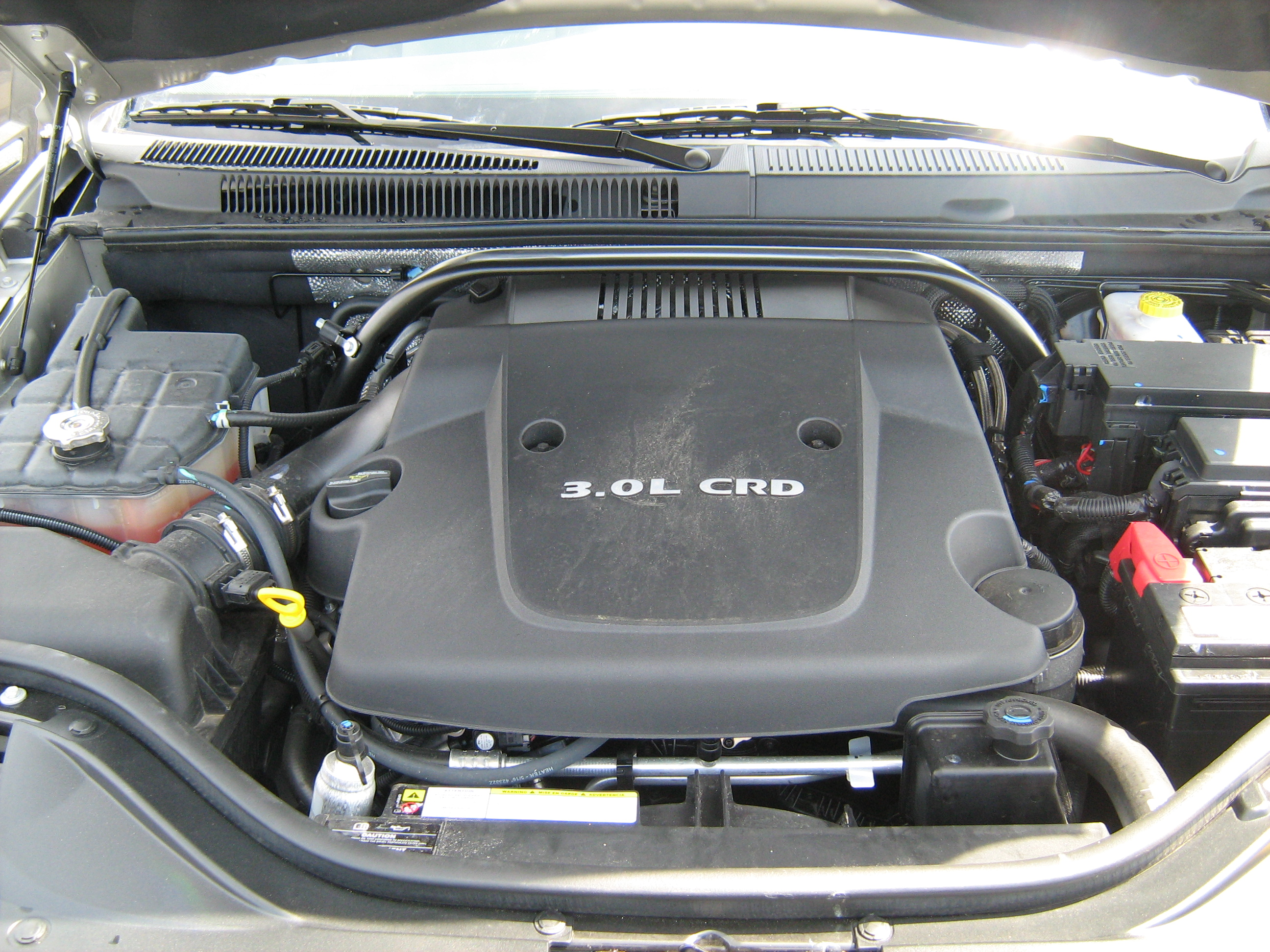
2005 Grand Cherokee with 3.0 V6 Turbo Diesel

In Europe, South America, South Africa, and Australia, a V6 CRD engine produced by Mercedes-Benz was available from the Grand Cherokee (WK) introduction in 2005:

OM642 3.0 L CRD V6 Turbo Diesel with Variable geometry turbocharger (VGT). It produces 215 hp (160 kW; 218 PS) and 376 lb⋅ft (510 N⋅m) of torque at 1,600 to 2,800 rpm at a fuel consumption of 17 mpg_{‑US} (14 L/100 km; 20 mpg_{‑imp}) city and 22 mpg_{‑US} (11 L/100 km; 26 mpg_{‑imp}) highway.

Note: MPG figures are based on United States Environmental Protection Agency, European combined consumption is 27.7 mpg_{‑imp} (10.2 L/100 km; 23.1 mpg_{‑US}).

In North America, the 3.0 CRD was available for the 2007 and 2008; however, the rest of the world - i.e., UK, Europe, Australia, etc.- had the Mercedes-sourced engine for the production life of the vehicle from 2005. The Mercedes-Benz sourced unit meets stringent Euro 4 Emission standards without the need for a diesel particulate filter, which hampers vehicle efficiency; however, it includes a diesel particulate filter (North America only) to further reduce exhaust emissions. It was not, however, available for sale in California or certain Northeast states, due to new stricter emissions regulations for non-commercial vehicles. Vehicles could be bought used in California and the Northeast states, as the regulations only applied to new vehicles.

This engine is also used in the majority of Mercedes-Benz vehicles: C-Class, CLS, E-Class, S-Class, ML-Class, GLK-Class, GL-Class, G-Class, R-Class, the Vito / Viano, and the Dodge / Freightliner / Mercedes-Benz Sprinter.

== Changes for the 2005–2010 Jeep Grand Cherokee WK ==
Throughout its five-model-year production run, the Jeep Grand Cherokee WK received many changes:

Launched on September 19, 2004, for the 2005 model year, the Grand Cherokee WK was all-new, following a 5-year development process from 1999 to 2004. The 3.7L Powertech V6 engine replaces the 4.0L Powertech Inline Six-Cylinder (I6) engine, and now produces a full 210 horsepower, up 15 horsepower from before. This engine is only available on the base Laredo trim level. The 4.7L Power-Tech High-Output V8 engine is replaced by a newly available 5.7L HEMI V8 engine featuring Multi-Displacement System (MDS), which allows the Grand Cherokee to run on four cylinders while at cruising speeds to increase fuel economy ratings. The new engine produces 345 horsepower (this engine is only available on the top-of-the-line Limited trim level). The standard 4.7L Power-Tech V8 engine, optional on the base Laredo trim level, and standard on the top-of-the-line Limited trim level, carries over from the previous-generation WJ Grand Cherokee, and still produces 235 horsepower. Seventeen-inch (17") tires and alloy wheels are standard on all models. The Electronic Vehicle Information Center (EVIC) moves from the overhead console to the instrument cluster, with controls now located in the center stack, making it easier for the driver to make changes to the settings while the vehicle is in motion. A Mercedes-Benz sourced five-speed automatic transmission is standard with the V6 and SRT8 engines, though the 545RFE five-speed automatic transmission carries over on the 4.7 and 5.7L V8-equipped Grand Cherokees. The all-new Grand Cherokee also gets the latest infotainment systems, which include an available full-color 5.8" GPS navigational system, the UConnect hands-free Bluetooth telephone system, Sirius Satellite Radio, and a rear seat DVD entertainment system, known as the Video Entertainment System (VES), which also included a pair of wireless IR headphones. A six-speaker, 276-watt Boston Acoustics premium sound system also replaces the Infinity Gold system. All four-wheel-drive systems are now computer-assisted for higher traction control, and a Quadra-Drive II, a four-wheel-drive system, is now available on most Grand Cherokees (See other Wiki page on Quadra-Drive 2 for more accurate information). The Selec-Trac manual four-wheel-drive system has been discontinued. A Rocky Mountain Edition trim level went into production on March 1, 2005, going on sale in late April 2005, and concluding at 9,500 examples on May 31, 2005.

For MY 2006, production started on July 5, 2005, and concluded on June 30, 2006. Sales began in September 2005. A 65th Anniversary Edition was introduced, which temporarily replaced the Rocky Mountain Edition trim level. The Overland trim level was new, as was an SRT8 trim level that went into production on November 5, 2005, and went on sale December 20, 2005. The AM/FM stereo with both cassette player and six-disc, in-dash CD/MP3 changer is discontinued. A new 3.0L CRD Diesel V6 engine debuts for both the Limited and Overland trim levels in mid-2006.

For MY 2007, production started on July 17, 2006 (SRT8, early August) and concluded on July 13, 2007. Sales began on September 1, 2006. The base Grand Cherokee Laredo gains exterior color-keyed door handles and rear brow, and revised tail lamps. The 26F and 28F Packages for the base Laredo trim level are now discontinued, though a 28E Package is now available for Laredo for those who desire a base model with a V8 engine. The Rocky Mountain Edition returns for 2007. In some states, the 4.7 L PowerTech V8 engine is now FlexFuel-capable, and can now run on E85 Ethanol.

For MY 2008, production commenced on July 16, 2007, and concluded on July 11, 2008. A mid-cycle restyling was launched on September 1, 2007, with a revised front clip and new tire and wheel combinations. A revised interior includes the latest infotainment systems, including touch-screen radios, as well as Sirius Backseat TV for rear seat passengers, a new steering wheel, a revised gauge cluster, and revised interior trim. The seat fabrics and trims are revised on all models. Midyear, the 4.7 L PowerTech V8 gets a power boost, now producing 305 horsepower, up 70 horsepower from its previous power rating. The 3.0L CRD Diesel V6 engine was also discontinued mid-year 2008. Heated rear seats are now an option on some models, as is a 115 V AC household-style power outlet. The 5.7 L HEMI V8 engine also gets a power boost, now producing 360 horsepower, up 15 horsepower from its previous power rating.

For MY 2009, production began on August 11, 2008, and concluded on August 10, 2009. The 3.0L CRD Diesel V6 engine was discontinued, while an S Limited trim level, which had been available in Europe, was introduced to the United States.

For MY 2010, production began on August 17, 2009, with WK production ending on March 12, 2010. The 4.7L PowerTech V8 engine and Overland trim level were omitted. The S Limited trim level is also discontinued, as is the Rocky Mountain Edition trim level. The base Laredo trim level gains the option of a 5.7 L HEMI V8 engine, and the Limited trim level gains the option of a 3.7 L PowerTech V6 engine, following the discontinuation of the 4.7 L PowerTech V8 engine for all Grand Cherokee models.

=== 2008 refresh ===
For 2008, the Grand Cherokee received a mid-cycle refresh. A revised front fascia included a new front grille, revised headlamps, as well as a new front bumper. In the rear, the 2008 Grand Cherokee received new tail lamps, and all models (except the SRT8) received new wheel and tire combinations. The interior was also completely restyled, with newly designed front bucket seats and new seating materials. The steering wheel was redesigned, and the instrument cluster received a facelift, with green backlighting changed to white. New aluminum and woodgrain interior trim was also available, depending upon trim level selection. The traditional integrated keyless entry remote and key were replaced by the new "FOBIK" keyless entry remote that included a redesigned ignition slot. Radios were also redesigned, with a 6.5-inch touchscreen display on select models, SiriusXM Travel Link available with the top-tier 730N GPS navigation radio, as well as voice activation, and an integrated UConnect Bluetooth hands-free phone system. SiriusXM Satellite Radio was also now standard equipment on all models. In the rear, a newly available 115-Volt household-style power outlet was included on select models, as well as heated outboard rear seats. The rear DVD entertainment system was redesigned to feature a larger LCD, as well as SiriusXM Backseat TV compatibility. All powertrains remained identical to the 2007 models, although 2008 would be the final year for the 3.0L CRD (Common Rail Diesel) V6 engine.

== Safety ==
=== ANCAP ===
ANCAP test results* Jeep Grand Cherokee variant(s) as tested (2005)
Test	Score
Overall	4 /5 stars
Frontal offset	9.49/16
Side impact	16/16
Pole	Not Assessed
Seat belt reminders	1/3
Whiplash protection	Not Assessed
Pedestrian protection	Poor
Electronic stability control	Standard

=== Euro NCAP ===
Euro NCAP test results* Jeep Grand Cherokee (2005)
Test	Score	Rating
Adult occupant:	26	4 /5 stars
Child occupant:	35	3 /5 stars
Pedestrian:	0	0 /4 stars

=== Insurance Institute for Highway Safety (IIHS) ===
2005-2010 Grand Cherokee IIHS scores
Moderate overlap frontal offset	Good
Small overlap frontal offset	Not Tested
Side impact	Marginal
Roof strength	Not Tested

=== NHTSA ===
2005-2010 Grand Cherokee NHTSA scores
Frontal Driver:	5/5 stars
Frontal Passenger:	5/5 stars
Side Driver:	5/5 stars
Side Passenger:	5/5 stars
4x2 Rollover:	3/5 stars
4x4 Rollover:	4/5 stars

=== Recall ===
May 2013: Chrysler recalled the Grand Cherokee over a rollaway risk.
