= Jeep Commander (XK) =

American mid-size SUV

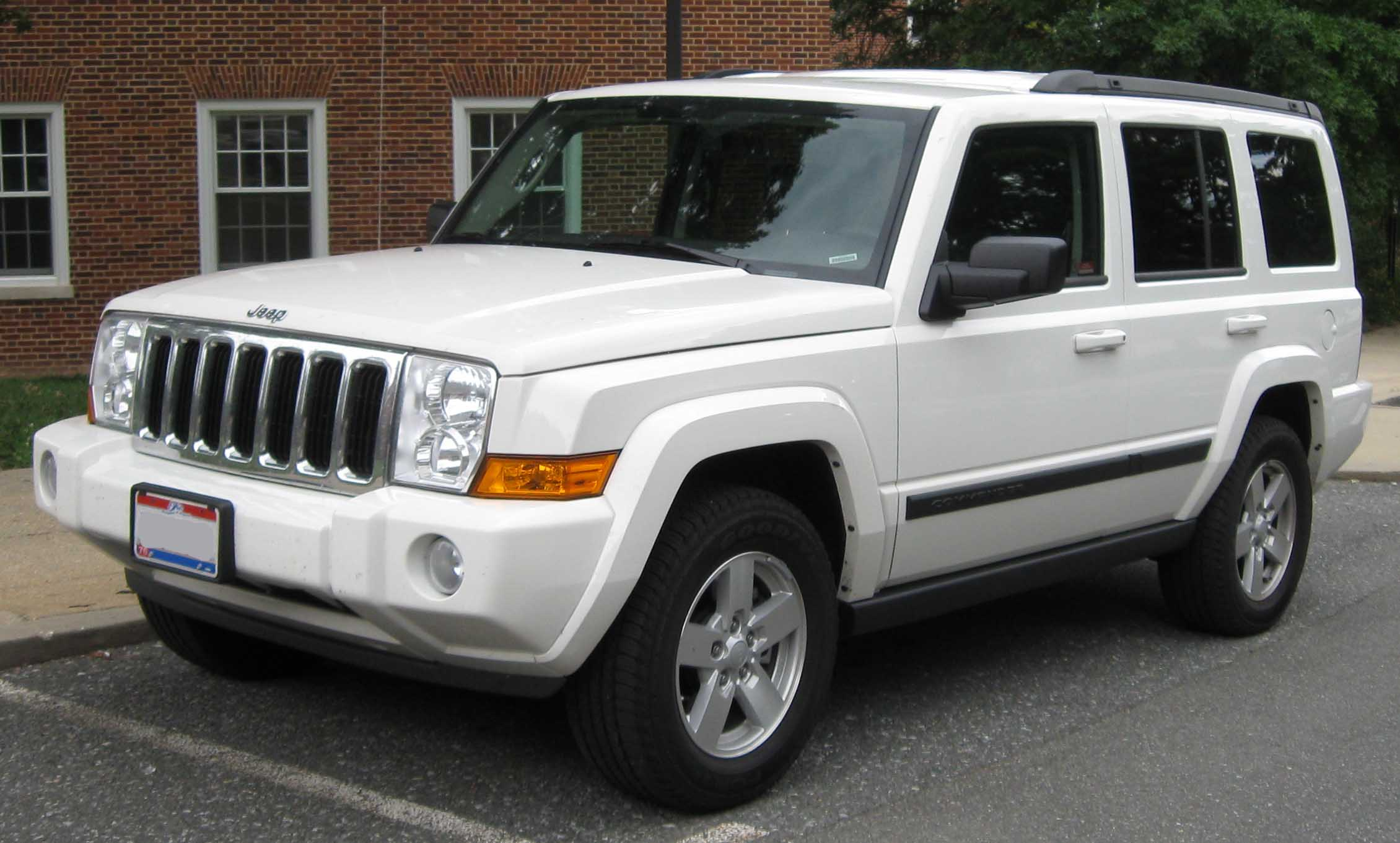
- 2006 Jeep Commander

Overview
- Manufacturer: Jeep (Note: DaimlerChrysler (2005–2007); Chrysler LLC (2007–2009); Chrysler Group LLC (2009–2010))
- Model code: XK; XH (diesel export version)
- Production: July 18, 2005 – 2010
- Model years: 2006–2010
- Assembly: United States: Detroit, Michigan (Jefferson North Assembly Plant); Austria: Graz (Magna Steyr; Commander XH)
- Designer: Don Renkert (2002)

Body and chassis
- Class: Mid-size SUV
- Body style: 4-door SUV
- Layout: Front-engine, rear-wheel drive / four-wheel drive
- Platform: Chrysler WK/WK2
- Related: Jeep Liberty/Cherokee; Jeep Grand Cherokee; Dodge Nitro; Jeep Wrangler

Powertrain
- Engine: 3.0 L OM642 V6 (turbocharged diesel); 3.7 L PowerTech V6 (gasoline); 4.7 L PowerTech V8 (gasoline / E85); 5.7 L Hemi V8 (gasoline)
- Transmission: 5-speed W5A580 automatic; 5-speed 545RFE automatic

Dimensions
- Wheelbase: 109.5 in (2,781 mm)
- Length: 188.5 in (4,788 mm)
- Width: 75.0 in (1,905 mm)
- Height: 71.9–75.6 in (1,826–1,920 mm)
- Curb weight: 4,391–4,829 lb (1,992–2,190 kg)

Chronology
- Predecessor: Jeep Grand Cherokee (WJ); Jeep Wagoneer (SJ)
- Successor: Jeep Grand Cherokee L

The Jeep Commander is a mid-size SUV that was manufactured from 2005 to 2010 by the Jeep division of the American manufacturer Chrysler.

== Concept car ==
Jeep exhibited a concept car named Commander during the 1999 auto show circuit. The concept featured an experimental direct methanol fuel cell that produced electricity to charge a nickel–metal hydride battery pack. Full-time four-wheel drive was by a severe-duty electric motor on each axle. The suspension could be raised 4 inches (102 mm) for traversing off-road purposes. The overall styling influenced the development of the third-generation Grand Cherokee that was at that time six years away. The concept car had the same height as production Grand Cherokees, but was about 8 inches (203 mm) wider. This allowed for an interior featuring an extra-wide center console in the front and three bucket seats in the second row. The Commander concept had no relation to the production SUV.

== Production ==
The production version of the Jeep Commander (XK and the diesel-powered XH export version) debuted at the 2005 New York Auto Show as a five- or seven-passenger counterpart of the Jeep Liberty. It was developed to target consumers who wanted a three-row SUV, but was designed to be only two inches longer than the Jeep Grand Cherokee with its two rows of seats, as well as to be assembled on the same production line.

It shared its unibody construction, independent short/long arm front suspension, and its 5-link live rear axle with the Grand Cherokee on which it was based. It featured an upright windshield and squared-off sides. Its stepped roof was disguised by the roof rack; a design similar to the GMC Envoy XL and Chevrolet TrailBlazer EXT. This allowed the second and third-row seats to be mounted higher than the first-row seats.

When released initially, the Jeep Commander was well reviewed by automotive journalists. In the November 2005 issue of Car and Driver, the 2006 Jeep Commander won a comparison with a 2006 Ford Explorer and is spoken about positively. The article coincides with the first model year of the Jeep Commander.

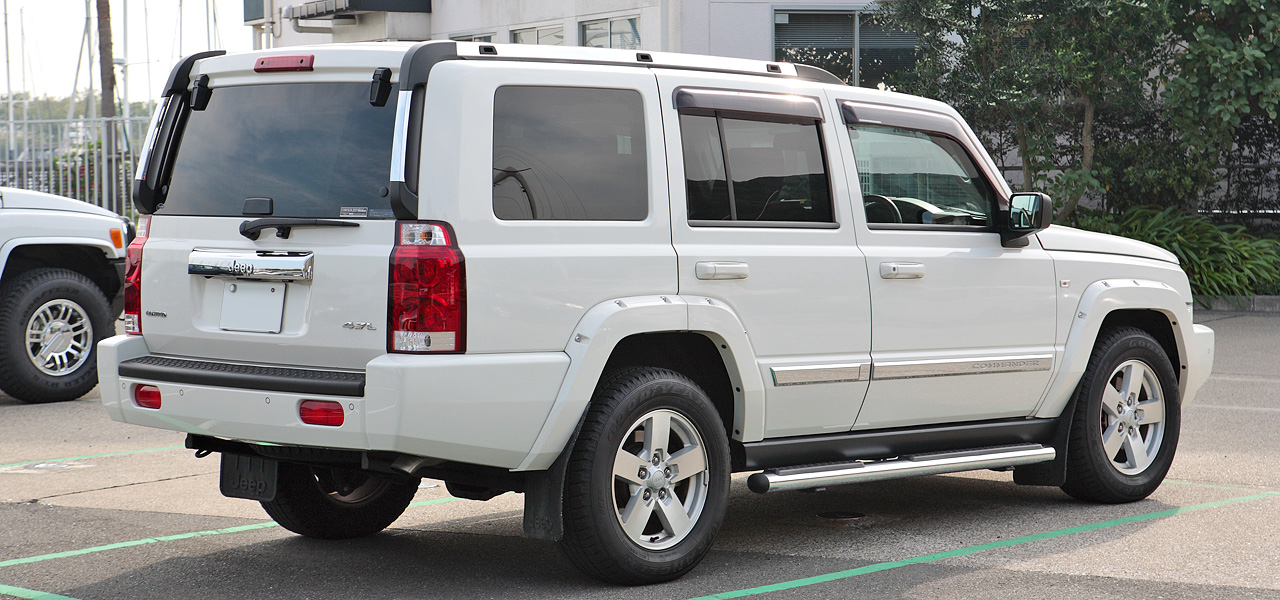
RHD Jeep Commander in Japan

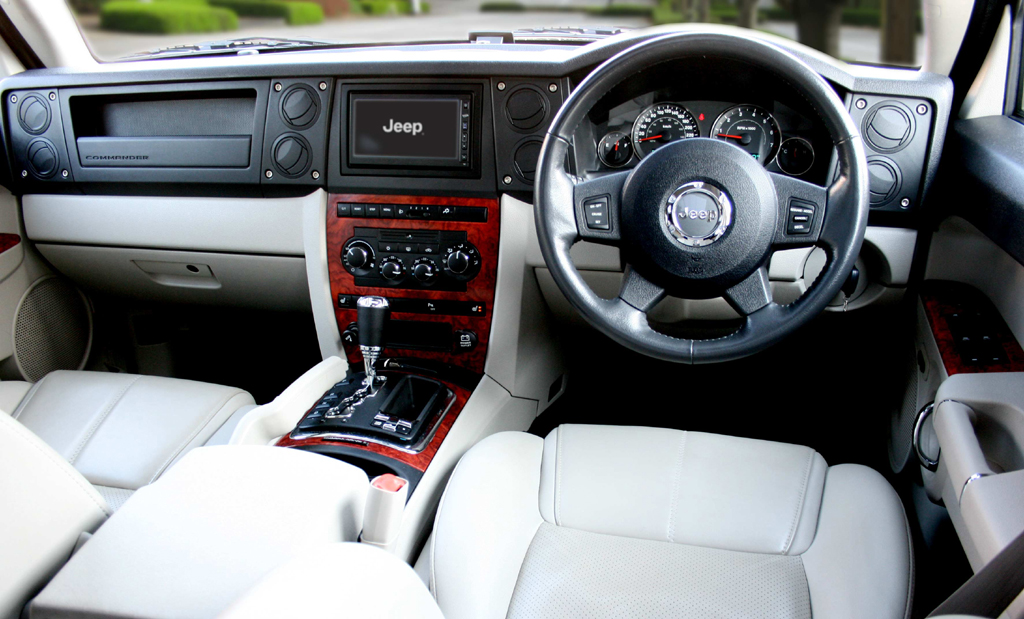
RHD interior

=== Features ===
Standard features included: electronic stability control, traction control, electronic roll mitigation, back up sensors, immobiliser, front dual-stage and side curtain airbags, TPMS, power heated mirrors, remote keyless entry, automatic headlights, UConnect infotainment system and a full-size spare wheel. Some optional features included: automatic wipers, a 276-watt Boston Acoustics premium sound system, hands-free phone integration, dual zone auto climate control, remote start, a power liftgate, heated first and second row seats, auto dimming mirrors, hill start assist, hill descent control, and adjustable pedals. Smartbeam headlights were also available as well as HID headlights.

The optional Command View sunroof package included a power front sunroof and two smaller sunroofs over the second-row seats. The Commander also had an optional entertainment package which included a DVD player, 9 in (229 mm) TV, and backup camera. In Europe and certain other markets like Chile, South Africa, and South Korea, the Commander offered a V6 Diesel engine.

=== Off-road capabilities ===
The Commander was offered three different four-wheel drive systems: Quadra-Trac I, Quadra-Trac II, and Quadra-Drive II. Quadra-Trac I was available on models equipped with the 3.7 L engine; it is a full-time system that requires no driver input. Quadra-Trac II was available on models equipped with a V8 engine; it is a full-time system as well, but adds a low range as well as a neutral position for towing. Quadra-Drive II expands on Quadra-Trac II by adding electronic limited-slip differentials to the front and rear axles. When equipped with Quadra-Drive II, skid plates for the fuel tank, front suspension, and transfer case were also added.

Ground clearance	8.3 in (210.8 mm)
Approach angle	34°
Departure angle	27°
Breakover angle	20°

== Trims ==
Base/Sport - 2006–2010: Includes: 3.7 L V6 engine or 4.7 L V8 engine, AM/FM radio with CD player and six speakers, alloy wheels, cloth seats, and Automatic transmission. keyless entry, power windows, door locks, driver's seat, and five-passenger seating; seven-passenger seating available.

Limited - 2006–2010: Includes: 4.7 L or 5.7 L HEMI V8 engine, AM/FM radio with six-disc integral CD changer and six Boston Acoustics speakers, security system, dual power seats, leather seats, and standard seven-passenger seating.

Overland - 2007–2009: Includes: 5.7 L Hemi V8 engine, AM/FM radio with GPS navigation and six-disc integral CD changer, Sirius satellite radio, wire mesh grille insert, leather-and-suede seats with embroidered Overland logos, wood-trimmed steering wheel, leather-wrapped emergency brake handle with leather-wrapped door handles as well, and dual-panel Command View sunroof.

65th Anniversary Edition - only in 2006: Includes 3.7 L or 4.7 L engine, unique 65th-anniversary badges on the front doors and front bucket seats, power driver seat, unique embroidered floor mats, folding third row seats, automatic front headlamps, front fog lamps, premium sound system with six speakers and a 276-watt external amplifier, an AM/FM stereo with six-disc, in-dash CD/MP3 changer, Sirius satellite radio, and Radio Data System (RDS), unique darkened seventeen-inch (17"x7.5") alloy wheels, a full-size spare tire on a matching wheel.

Rocky Mountain - (2007–2009): Includes 3.7 L or 4.7 L engine, unique Rocky Mountain badges on the front doors and front bucket seats, power driver seat, folding third-row seats, automatic front headlamps, front fog lamps, Boston Acoustics premium sound system with six speakers and a 276-watt external amplifier, an AM/FM stereo with six-disc, in-dash CD/MP3 changer, (navigation available), Sirius satellite radio, and Radio Data System (RDS), unique darkened seventeen-inch (17"x7.5") alloy wheels, a full-size spare tire on a matching wheel.

== Engines ==
Years	Engine	Power	Torque	Notes
2005–2010	3.7 L PowerTech V6	210 hp (157 kW)	235 lb⋅ft (319 N⋅m)	Base/Sport
2005–2007	4.7 L PowerTech V8	235 hp (175 kW)	290 lb⋅ft (393 N⋅m)	Base/Sport/Limited
2008–2009	4.7 L PowerTech V8	305 hp (227 kW)	334 lb⋅ft (453 N⋅m)	Base/Sport/Limited
2005–2008	5.7 L Hemi V8	330 hp (246 kW)	370 lb⋅ft (502 N⋅m)	Limited/Overland
2009–2010	5.7 L Hemi V8	360 hp (268 kW)	390 lb⋅ft (529 N⋅m)	Sport/Limited/Overland
2006–2010	3.0 L OM642 Diesel V6	218 hp (163 kW)	376 lb⋅ft (510 N⋅m)	XH - Outside North America

== Discontinuation ==
The Jeep Commander was discontinued after the 2010 model year. Chrysler announced that the 2011 Dodge Durango would be its successor, which is produced alongside its platform-mate, the 2011 Jeep Grand Cherokee at Jefferson North Assembly in Detroit, Michigan. Shortly after production ended, Chrysler CEO Sergio Marchionne said of the Commander, "That vehicle was unfit for human consumption. We sold some. But I don't know why people bought them."

In 2017, Jeep released a three-row concept vehicle based on the Jeep Cherokee (KL) platform for the Chinese market, called the Jeep Yuntu, utilizing a plug-in gasoline/electric hybrid power train.

A three-row version of the Jeep Cherokee (KL) with slightly altered styling was released exclusively for the Chinese market, named the Jeep Grand Commander. While similar in size to the original Commander, the Grand Commander will offer four-cylinder power. It will not be sold in any other markets.

== Total sales ==
Year	USA	Mexico
2005	17,048	176
2006	88,497	1,013
2007	63,027	558
2008	27,694	216
2009	12,655	79
2010	8,115	24
2011	105	
