= Mercedes-Benz 5G-Tronic transmission =

5-speed automatic from 1996

5G-Tronic

Overview
- Manufacturer: Mercedes-Benz (Daimler AG); FCA-US
- Model code: W5A 330 · W5A 580 · A580 (Chrysler) · Type 722.6
- Production: 1996-2020

Body and chassis
- Class: 5-speed longitudinal automatic transmission
- Related: ZF 5HP family · ZF 6HP

Chronology
- Predecessor: 4G-Tronic
- Successor: 7G-Tronic

5G-Tronic is the unofficial name given by car enthusiasts to Mercedes-Benz's 5-speed automatic transmission family W5A for longitudinal engines. It was produced from 1996 to 2020 in different variants as converter-5-gear-automatic transmission (German: Wandler-5-Gang-Automatik). The core models W5A 330 and W5A 580 are for engines up to 330 N⋅m (243 lb⋅ft) or 580 N⋅m (428 lb⋅ft) maximum input torque. The W5A 280 and W5A 300 were built for vans and SUVs, the W5A 400 for off-road applications (RWD and 4X4), and the W5A 900 (up to 1,000 N⋅m (738 lb⋅ft)) for V12-applications.

== Key data ==
Gear ratios (Note: Differences in gear ratios have a measurable, direct impact on vehicle dynamics, performance, waste emissions as well as fuel mileage)
Model	Type Series	First Deliv- ery	Gear							Total Span			Avg. Step	Components		Nomenclature			
Model	Type Series	First Deliv- ery	R 2	R 1	1	2	3	4	5	Nomi- nal	Effec- tive	Cen- ter	Avg. Step	Total	per Gear (Note: Forward gears only)	Cou- pling	Gears Count	Ver- sion	Maximum Input Torque
W5A 280 W5A 300 W5A 330	722.6; NAG 1 (Note: NAG 1: 1st generation of advanced automatic transmissions, at Mercedes-Benz referred to as NAG 1 (New Automatic Gearbox Generation 1 · German: Neue Automatikgetriebe-Generation 1))	1996	−1.899	−3.100	3.932	2.408	1.486	1.000	0.830	4.735	3.733	1.807	1.475	3 Gearsets; 3 Brakes; 3 Clutches	1.800	W (Note: Torque converter · German: Wandler or Drehmomentwandler)	5	A	280 N⋅m (207 lb⋅ft) (Note: W5A 280: for vans: Vito · Sprinter · Vario); 300 N⋅m (221 lb⋅ft) (Note: W5A 300: for SUV with 6 cylinder engines); 330 N⋅m (243 lb⋅ft) (Note: W5A 330: small core model: for passenger cars with 4, 5 and 6 cylinder engines)
W5A 400 W5A 580 W5A 900	722.6; NAG 1	1996	−1.926	−3.160	3.588	2.186	1.405	1.000	0.831	4.315	3.802	1.727	1.441	3 Gearsets; 3 Brakes; 3 Clutches	1.800	W	5	A	400 N⋅m (295 lb⋅ft) (Note: W5A 400: for SUV with 8 cylinder engines); 580 N⋅m (428 lb⋅ft) (Note: W5A 580: big core model: for passenger cars with 8 and 12 cylinder engines and later for the 6 cylinder turbocharged diesel direct injection engines); 1,000 N⋅m (738 lb⋅ft) (Note: W5A 900: for cars with 8 and 12 cylinder turbocharged engines)
W5A 330	722.6; NAG 1	2004	−1.930	−3.147	3.951	2.423	1.486	1.000	0.833	4.742	3.778	1.814	1.476	3 Gearsets; 3 Brakes; 3 Clutches	1.800	W	5	A	330 N⋅m (243 lb⋅ft) (Note: W5A 330: for cars from Chrysler with 6 cylinder engines)
W5A 580	722.6; NAG 1	2004	−1.926	−3.167	3.595	2.186	1.405	1.000	0.831	4.327	3.812	1.728	1.442	3 Gearsets; 3 Brakes; 3 Clutches	1.800	W	5	A	580 N⋅m (428 lb⋅ft) (Note: W5A 580: built by Chrysler as A580 for cars from Chrysler with 8 cylinder engines)

== History ==
This fourth-generation transmission by Mercedes-Benz replaced the older 4-speed 4G-Tronic transmission-family and its 5-speed derivative, and was replaced by the much more complex and costly 7-speed Mercedes-Benz 7G-Tronic transmission (model W7A 700 · type 722.9) introduced in 2003. Due to its high torque capacity and lower cost, it was retained for turbocharged V8 and V12 engines, 4-cylinder applications and commercial vehicles for almost a decade. Production ended in 2020 with niche applications like Sprinter with petrol/CNG M111 engine and Jeep Wrangler.

== Specifications ==
=== Winter/summer (standard) mode ===
Activated by a toggle switch, Winter mode sets the gearbox to start off in 2nd gear, both in Drive and Reverse. This is designed to reduce wheelspin on icy surfaces. Also in "W" mode the transmission will shift at lower speeds. "S" mode is not sport but Sommer (German for summer) or Standard.

With Jaguar XJR applications the switch is labeled "Sport." In regular driving mode the gearbox starts off in 2nd gear, both in Drive and Reverse, and will only engage 1st gear when triggered via the kickdown switch (Drive only). While "Sport" mode is enabled the gearbox will always start off in 1st gear.

=== Speedshift (2001–) ===
Speedshift is a performance feature set for the Mercedes-Benz transmissions which includes manual mode and active downshifting. When cornering at high speed, the transmission maintains the same gear above a certain lateral acceleration level. It can also automatically downshift before overtaking.

It was first used in 2001 Mercedes-Benz C 32 AMG and 2001 Mercedes-Benz SLK 32 AMG.

=== AMG Speedshift (2002–) ===
A version with mechanical lock-up of the torque converter from first gear and steering-wheel-mounted shifter. AMG Speedshift is also used in 7G-Tronic transmission.

It was first used in 2002 Mercedes-Benz E 55 AMG, S 55 AMG, C55, CL 55 AMG.

=== AMG Speedshift R ===
A version used in Mercedes-Benz SLR McLaren. It includes three manual modes.

== Planetary gearset concept ==
=== Improved fuel economy ===
The 5G-Tronic is an electronically shifted 5-speed overdrive automatic transmission with torque converter lock-up, typically in gears 3, 4 and 5.

The main objective in replacing the predecessor model was to improve vehicle fuel economy with extra speeds and a wider gear span to allow the engine speed level to be lowered (downspeeding), which is a decisive factor in improving energy efficiency and thus reducing fuel consumption. In addition, the lower engine speed level improves the noise-vibration-harshness comfort and the exterior noise is reduced.

== Applications ==
Variants and applications
Model Make	Car Model (Note: without any claim of completeness)
Mercedes models
C-Class	1996–2000 W 202; 2001–2005 W 203 (all models); 2006–2007 W 203 (4-cyl and 4-matic models only); 2007–2011 W 204 (4-cyl models only)
CLK-Class	1998–2002 C 208; 2003–2005 C 209 (all models except 2005 CLK 500); 2006–2009 C 209 (4-cyl and CLK 55 AMG only)
E-Class	1996–2002 W 210 (all models except some early 1996 cars); 2002–2006 W 211 (all models except 2004-2006 RWD E 500); 2007–2009 W 211 (4-cyl and 4-matic only); 2009–2011 W 212 (4-cyl models only)
S-Class	1996–1998 W 140; 1999–2005 W 220; 2006–2013 W 221 (V12 models only)
CL-Class	1996–1998 C 140; 2000–2006 C 215; 2007–2014 C 216 (V12 Models only)
CLS-Class	2004–2006 C 219
ML-Class	1998–2005 W 163
G-Class	1996–2006 W 463 (all models); 2007–2012 W 463 (G 55 AMG only)
SLK-Class	1997–2003 R 170; 2004–2010 R 171 (4-cyl models only)
SL-Class	1996–2001 R 129; 2001–2004 R 230 (all models); 2005–2006 R 230 (all models except SL 500); 2007–2011 R 230 (SL 55 AMG and V12 models only)
SLR	2005–2009 W 199
Maybach	2002–2013 57 and 62
Other models
Jeep	2002–2013 Grand Cherokee (02-04 WG Diesel W5J400, 05-10 Gran Cherokee (WK) V6, WK 6.1 SRT V8, WH V6 3.0 Diesel export only Steyr W5A580); 2006–2010 Commander (XK) XK (3.7 gas) XH (3.0 diesel - export); 2012–2018 Wrangler (JK); Liberty (KK) (W5A580)
Dodge	2005–2008 Magnum (AWD, RT, SRT8 only); 2006–2014 Charger (2006-14 R/T, SRT8; 5.7, 6.1L, & 6.4) (2006-2007 3.5L V6 HO); 2006–2020 Charger Pursuit; 2007–2011 Nitro (4.0L and 2,8 diesel); 2009–2014 Challenger (Various V6 and V8 trims); 2011–2012 Durango (V6 Models only); 2003–2006 Dodge Sprinter Vans (North America)
Chrysler	2004–2008 Crossfire, all models; 2005–2014 300
Lancia	2011–2014 Thema
Jaguar	1998–2003 308 (Supercharged models only); 1998–2002 XK (X 100) (Supercharged models only)
SsangYong	1997–2014 Chairman H; 2001–2017 Rexton; 2004–2019 Rudius; 2005–2014 Kyron; 2014–2018 Actyon
Porsche	2001–2010 996.2 and 997.1 Carrera and Turbo
Freightliner	2001–2007 Freightliner Sprinter Vans (USA)

== See also ==
- List of Mercedes-Benz transmissions
- List of Chrysler transmissions
