= Chrysler RFE transmission =

Overview
- Manufacturer: Chrysler Corporation
- Also called: 45RFE/545RFE; 68RFE; 65RFE/66RFE
- Production: 1999-present

Body and chassis
- Class: 4, 5 or 6-speed automatic

Chronology
- Predecessor: Chrysler TorqueFlite transmission
- Successor: TorqueFlite 8 transmission

The RFE is an automatic transmission family from Chrysler. The name refers to its Rear wheel drive design and Full Electronic control system.

== 45RFE and 545RFE ==
The 45RFE was introduced in the Jeep Grand Cherokee in 1999, it is notable for including three planetary gearsets rather than the two normally used in a 4-speed automatic. It also features three multiple disc input clutches, three multiple disc holding clutches, and a dual internal filter system (one primary filter for transmission sump, one for the fluid cooler return system). In the 45RFE applications four gears are utilized. In the 545RFE four gears are used on the upshift and a new "gear", 2nd Prime, was used with a different (1.67:1 rather than 1.50:1) ratio to increase versatility when downshifting. Although, with some tuning, you can get the 545RFE to upshift into 2nd Prime.

The 45RFE was produced at the Indiana Transmission plant in Kokomo, Indiana. It was normally paired with the 4.7 L PowerTech V8.

The 45RFE later became the 5-speed 545RFE.

- Gear Ratios:
  - 1st 3.00:1
  - 2nd 1.50:1
  - 2nd Prime 1.67:1 (Only used when a kickdown acceleration)
  - 3rd 1.00:1
  - 4th 0.75:1
  - 5th 0.67:1 (545RFE only and 45RFE reprogrammed)
  - Reverse 3.00:1

Applications:

- 45RFE
  - 1999–2000 Jeep Grand Cherokee (4.7 L)
  - 2002–early 2003 Jeep Liberty (3.7 L)
  - 2000–2002 Dodge Dakota (4.7 L) and "(3.9 L) Sport Edition Dakota"
  - 2000–2002 Dodge Durango (4.7 L)
  - 2002 Dodge Ram 1500 (3.7 L and 4.7 L)
- 545RFE
  - 2001–2011 Jeep Grand Cherokee (4.7 L, 4.7 L H.O.,5.7 L Hemi)
  - 2005–2006 Jeep Liberty (Diesel applications)
  - 2003–2011 Dodge Ram (4.7 L, 5.7 L Hemi)
  - 2005–2011 Dodge Power Wagon
  - 2003–2011 Dodge Dakota (4.7 L, 4.7 L H.O.)
  - 2003–2011 Dodge Durango (4.7 L, 5.7 L)
  - 2006–2010 Jeep Commander (4.7 L, 5.7 L Hemi)
  - 2007–2010 Jeep Wrangler (2.8 L CRD)
  - 2007–present LTI/London Taxi Company TX4
  - 2007-2009 Chrysler Aspen (4.7 L, 5.7 L Hemi)

== 68RFE ==
The 68RFE was introduced in 2007 Ram 2500 and 3500 Pickups with the 6.7 L Cummins ISB Diesel engine. The basic design and operation is the same or similar to the 45 and 545RFE counterparts with the following exceptions:

- larger bellhousing with different bolt pattern and cutout to accommodate diesel engine
- modified internal components to handle increased torque of diesel engine
- revised gear ratios and Transmission Controller programming for larger application
- no 2nd gear prime for downshifting like the 45RFE and 545RFE transmissions
- Gear Ratios:
  - 1st 3.23:1
  - 2nd 1.83:1
  - 3rd 1.41:1
  - 4th 1.00:1
  - 5th 0.81:1
  - 6th 0.62:1
  - Reverse 4.44:1

Applications:

- 2007–present Dodge Ram 2500 and 3500 Pickup (6.7L Cummins ISB Diesel)

== 65RFE and 66RFE ==
For the 2012 model year, the 545RFE was recalibrated and introduced as the 65RFE in Ram 1500 models. With the exception of an improved torque converter, it is physically the same as its predecessor. The key difference in the 65RFE is the ability to use all six forward gears in sequence when using Electronic Range Select mode. In normal drive mode, however, the 65RFE uses the shift pattern of the 545RFE; thus never using 2nd and 3rd gears in succession. 2500 and 3500 models with gas engines received the 66RFE, a hybrid of 68RFE internals (including the gearset) packaged in a 545RFE case.

Gear Ratios:

- 65RFE
  - 1st 3.00:1
  - 2nd 1.67:1
  - 3rd 1.50:1
  - 4th 1.00:1
  - 5th 0.75:1
  - 6th 0.67:1
  - Reverse 3.00:1
- 66RFE
  - 1st 3.231:1
  - 2nd 1.837:1
  - 3rd 1.410:1
  - 4th 1.000:1
  - 5th 0.816:1
  - 6th 0.625:1
  - Reverse 4.444:1

Applications:

- 65RFE
  - 2012 Dodge Durango (5.7 L)
  - 2012-2013 Jeep Grand Cherokee (5.7 L)
  - 2012 Ram 1500 (4.7 L, 5.7 L)
- 66RFE
  - 2012-2018 Ram 2500 (5.7 L)
  - 2012-2018 Ram Chassis Cab 3500 (5.7 L)
  - 2012-2018 Ram 2500 Power Wagon
  - 2014-2018 Ram 2500 (6.4 L)

== Basic RFE operation ==
The fully electronic control is accomplished by the Transmission Control Module (TCM). Depending on year and application, it can either be a stand-alone module or integrated with the Powertrain Control Module (PCM). The TCM uses data from various transmission and engine sensors to control transmission shifting. The TCM operates the solenoid pack to change hydraulic flow through the valve body to various clutches in the transmission. The solenoid pack is mounted directly to the valve body; its connector protrudes from a hole on the left side of the transmission. On the 45 and 545RFE the hydraulic control system design (without electronic assist) provides the transmission with PARK, REVERSE, NEUTRAL, SECOND, and THIRD gears, based solely on driver shift lever selection. This design allows the vehicle to be driven (in “limp-in” mode) in the event of an electronic control system failure, or a situation that the Transmission Control Module (TCM) recognizes as potentially damaging to the transmission. On the 68RFE, fourth gear is used for limp-in instead of second and third.

All RFE transmissions use Mopar ATF +4. Service fill is 6–8 quarts plus transmission filter.

== See also ==
- List of Chrysler transmissions
