= Mitsubishi Triton =

Mid-size pickup truck produced by Mitsubishi Motors

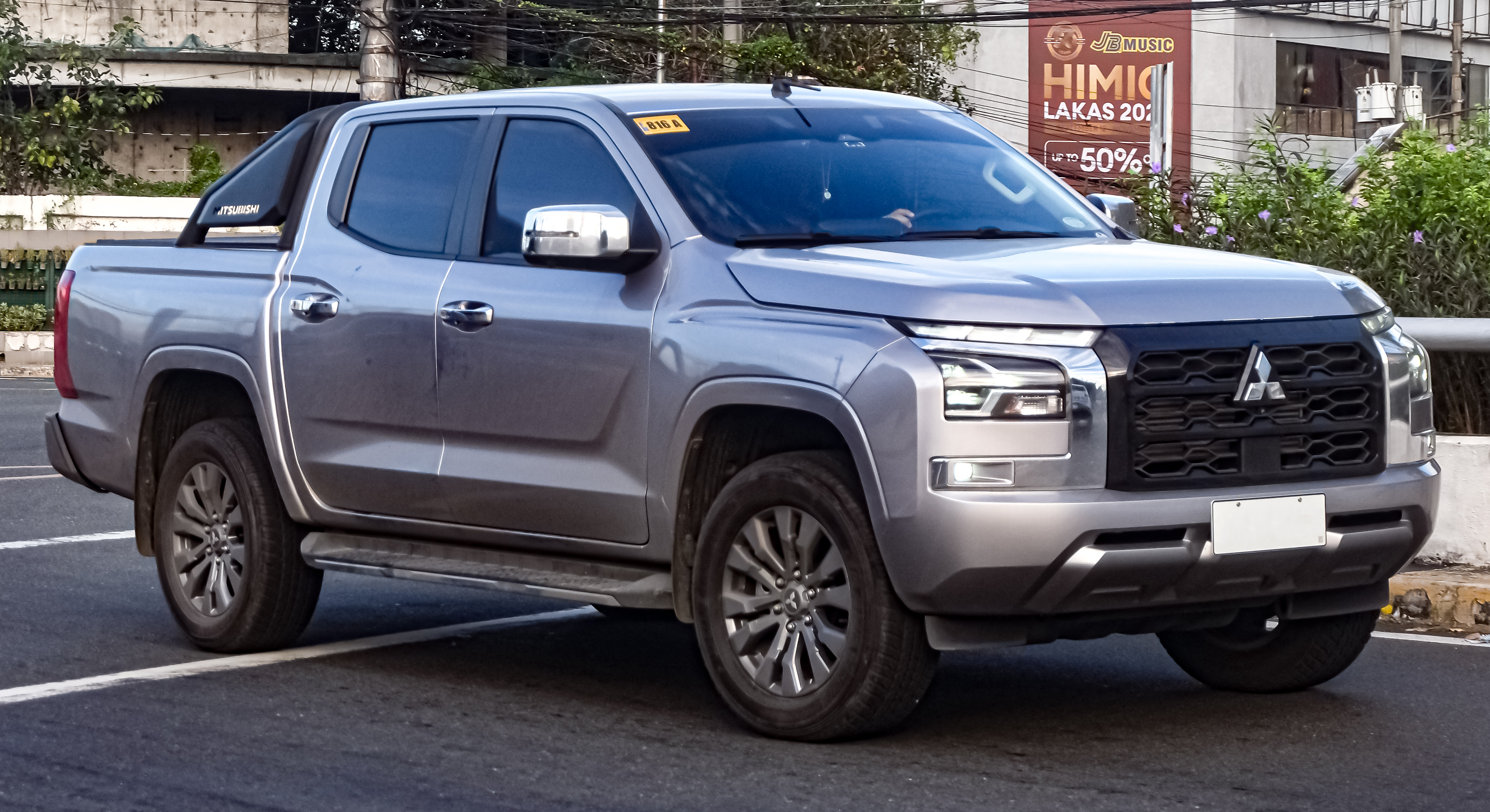
- 2024 Mitsubishi Triton 2.4 GLS (Philippines)

Overview
- Manufacturer: Mitsubishi Motors
- Also called: Mitsubishi L200; Mitsubishi Strada; Nissan Navara (2026–present)
- Production: 1978–present

Body and chassis
- Class: Mid-size pickup truck
- Layout: Front-engine, rear-wheel-drive or four-wheel-drive
- Chassis: Body-on-frame

The Mitsubishi Triton, also known as the Mitsubishi L200, is a mid-size pickup truck produced by Mitsubishi Motors. In Japan, where it has only been sold intermittently and in small numbers, it was originally known as the Mitsubishi Forte and from 1991 as the Strada. In the United States, Mitsubishi marketed it as the Mitsubishi Mighty Max until 1996. Chrysler Corporation sold captive imports as the Dodge D50, Dodge Ram 50 and Plymouth Arrow truck in the U.S. and as the Chrysler D-50 in Australia.

For most export markets the name L200 is used, though it has also been known as the Rodeo, Colt, Storm, Magnum, Strakar (used in Portugal since 1999; Strakar is a portmanteau of Strada and Dakar), and others. In 2015, Fiat Professional launched a rebadged version as the Fiat Fullback. In 2016, Ram Trucks launched a rebadged version as the Ram 1200 for the Middle East market.

Cumulative sales of the first three generations exceeded 2.8 million units around the world. As of February 2021, the pickup truck is sold in every available Mitsubishi market except the United States, Canada, Japan, India and China. In Japan, it was previously sold at a specific retail chain called Car Plaza.

== First generation (L200; 1978) ==
First generation
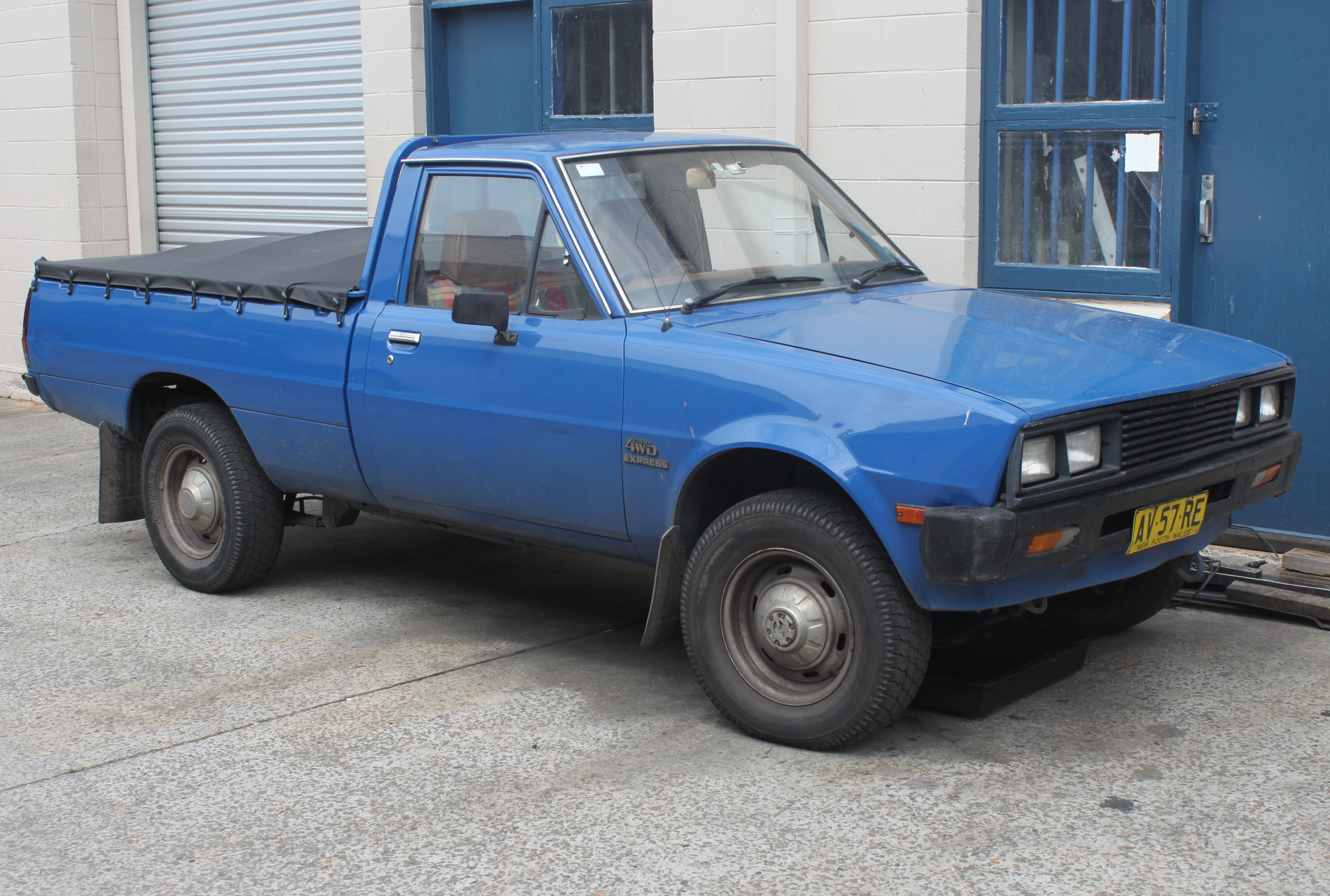
- 1984 Mitsubishi L200 Express (facelift; Australia)

Overview
- Model code: L200
- Also called: Mitsubishi Forte; Mitsubishi L200; Mitsubishi L200 Express (AU); Mitsubishi L200 Power X (TH); Mitsubishi L200 Slender (TH); Mitsubishi L200 Astron (TH); Mitsubishi Mighty Max (1982–1986); Chrysler D-50 (Australia); Chrysler L200 Express (Australia); Dodge D50 (1979–1980); Dodge Ram 50 (1981–1986); Plymouth Arrow Truck (1979–1982)
- Production: 1978–1986
- Model years: 1979–1986
- Assembly: Japan: Okazaki, Aichi (Nagoya Plant); Thailand: Laem Chabang; Philippines: Cainta

Body and chassis
- Body style: 2-door pickup

Powertrain
- Engine: Petrol: 1.6 L 4G32/G32B I4; 2.0 L 4G52 I4; 2.0 L G63B I4; 2.6 L 4G54 I4; Diesel: 2.3 L 4D55 turbo I4; 2.5 L 4D56 I4
- Transmission: 4-speed manual 5-speed KM132/KM145 manual

Dimensions
- Wheelbase: 2,780 mm (109.4 in) (SWB 2WD); 2,790 mm (110 in) (SWB 4WD); 3,035 mm (119.5 in) (LWB)
- Length: 4,690 mm (184.6 in)
- Width: 1,650 mm (65.0 in)
- Height: 1,560–1,645 mm (61–65 in)

The first generation model of Mitsubishi's compact pickup truck was first sold in Japan as the Mitsubishi Forte in September 1978 and continued until late 1986, when the line was cancelled in the Japanese domestic market for five years. In Japan the Forte was originally sold with the 92 PS (68 kW) 1.6-litre 4G32 engine (L021P). Later this was updated to the 86 PS (63 kW) 1.6-litre G32B engine with two-wheel drive (LO25) or with four-wheel drive coupled to the 2.0-litre 4G63T with 206 PS (152 kW) (L026). Offered in basic Deluxe trim, the larger-engined version was also available in leisure-oriented Custom trim. The Custom also has a smoother and less utilitarian bed, without provisions for fitting a canvas top and with fewer hardpoints for strapping down loads.

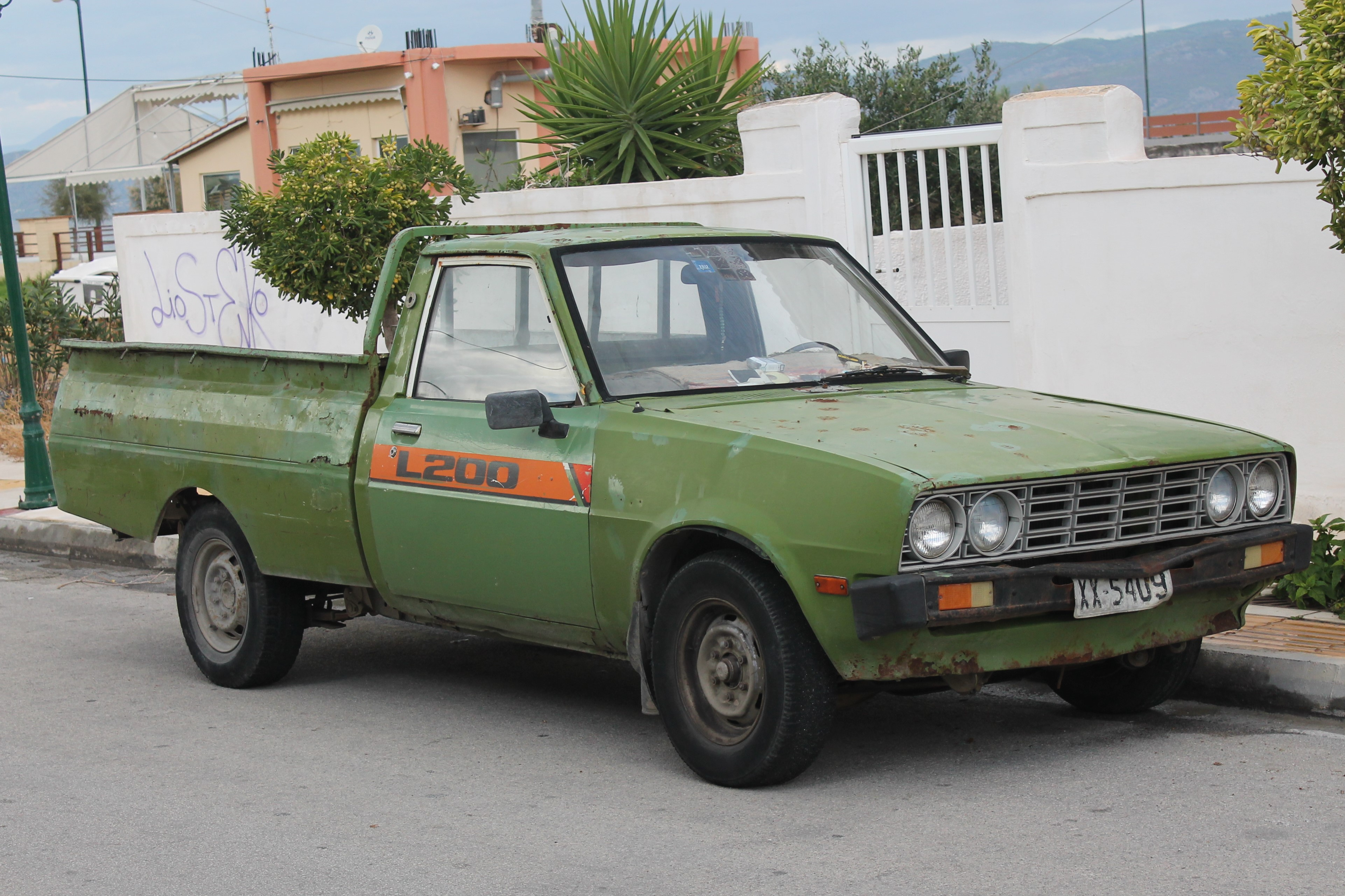
1978 Mitsubishi L200 (pre-facelift)

In export versions, the 2.0-litre petrol version had 93 hp (69 kW), while a larger 2.6-litre unit offered 105 hp (78 kW). Also popular in many markets, was a 67 PS (49 kW) 2.3-litre diesel engine. The 73 PS (54 kW) 1.6-litre Saturn engine rounded out the lineup in many countries. A naked cab and chassis version was also available in some markets.

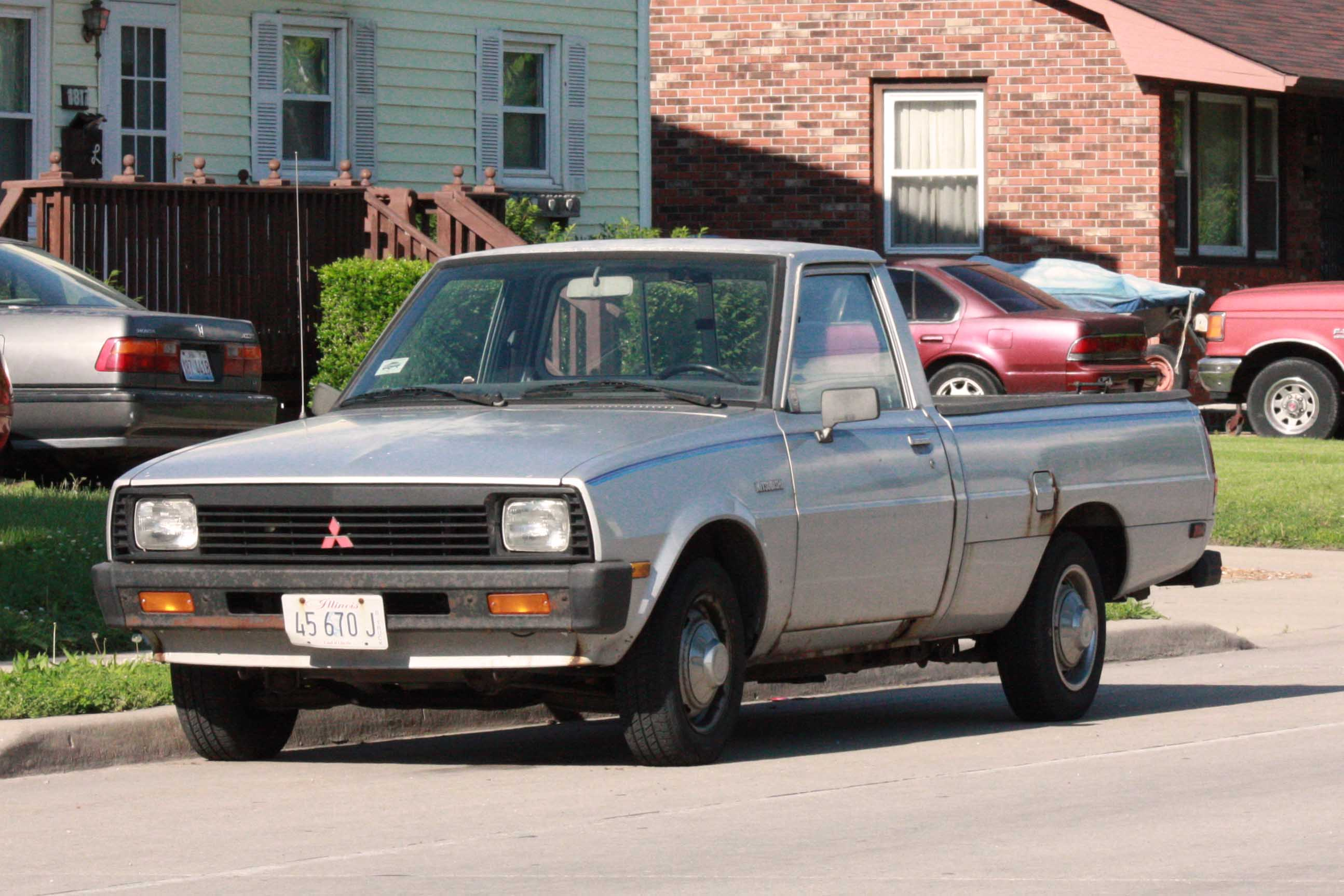
1983 Mitsubishi Mighty Max

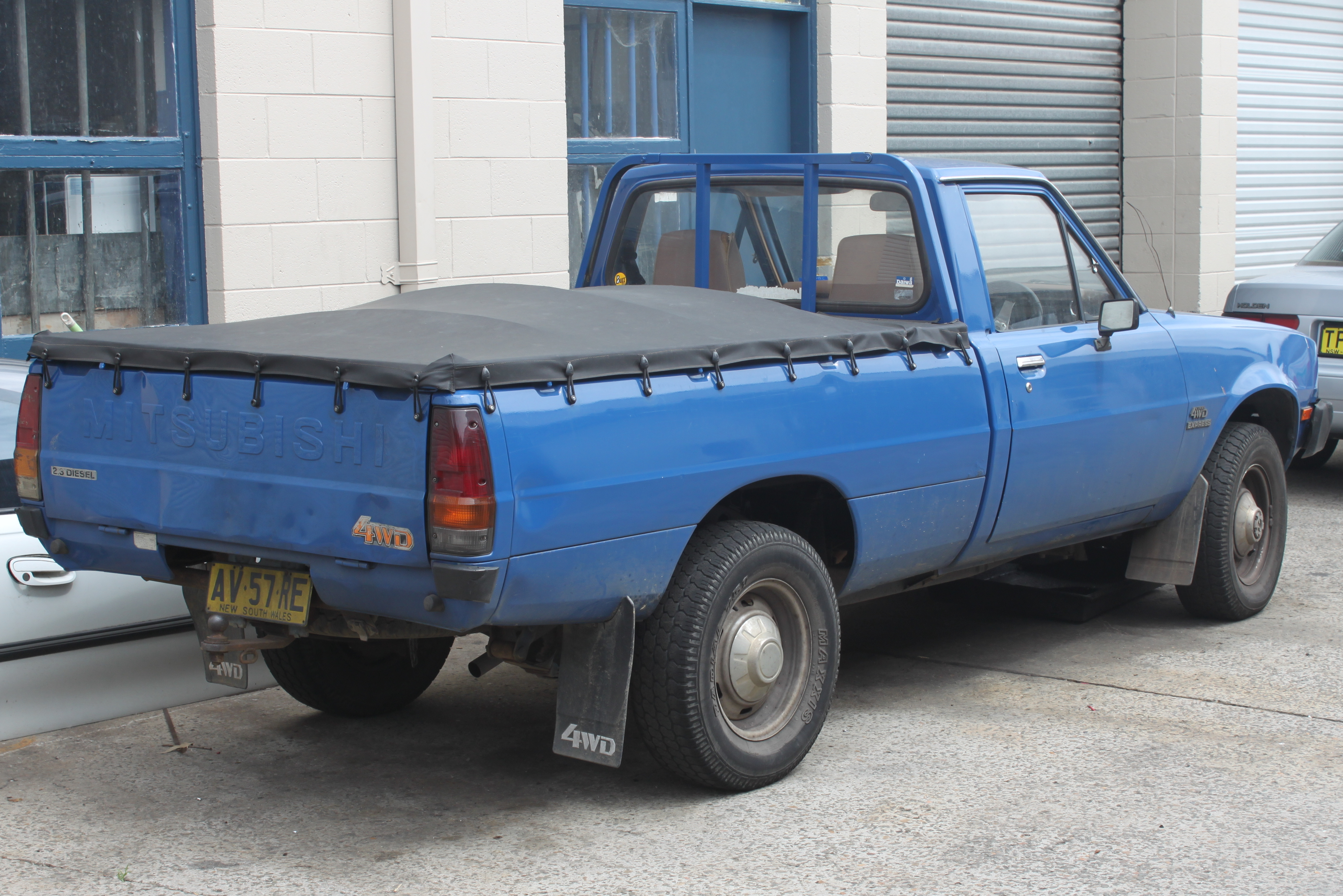
1984 Mitsubishi L200 Express 4WD utility (facelift; Australia)

Mechanical features included recirculating ball steering and front disc brakes, rear-wheel drive, and front suspension with coil springs. Four-wheel drive (4WD) was added in 1981, featuring torsion bar suspension up front. The rear suspension for both comprised leaf springs with bias-mounted shock absorbers. The 4WD system incorporated an extra lever located alongside the main four-speed shifter. This provided three positions; 2WD in high-range, 4WD in high-range, and 4WD in low-range. In low-range, the vehicle travels at half road speed for any given engine rpm. The transfer case is chain-driven to the front wheels, making it lighter, quieter, and easier to shift than the more common gear type. As such, the driver can shift between 2WD and 4WD in high-range without using the clutch, with the activation of low-range requiring the vehicle to be stopped. A warning lamp would light when the 4WD was engaged.

=== Chrysler variants ===
The Dodge Ram 50 (called the Dodge D50 for 1979 and 1980) was a badge-engineered version sold by the Chrysler Corporation from 1979 on. The label lasted until 1994, through two generations. Plymouth also received a version of the vehicle known as the Plymouth Arrow Truck, sold from 1979 to 1982. This was Chrysler's belated answer to the Ford Courier from Mazda and the Chevrolet LUV by Isuzu (both of which had been introduced in 1972), while the Toyota Hilux and Datsun Truck were already available and imported directly from Japan. Mitsubishi itself imported it as the Mitsubishi Mighty Max when it began selling directly in the US from 1982, at which point the Plymouth ceased to be available. The Dodge version had quad rectangular headlights beginning with the 1983 facelift, while Mitsubishis and earlier Dodges had single units in North America. In the rest of the world, importers could choose between single or double rectangular units, as well as twin round headlights. The twin round units were the original fitment for the Japanese domestic market.

Four-wheel drive was added for 1982. This created the Power Ram 50 in the United States, as in Dodge's nomenclature the "Power Ram" name was used for four wheel drive models. A turbo diesel engine was available in US models between 1983 and 1985. The 1983 turbodiesel was fitted with a TC05 non-wastegated turbo and produced 80 hp (60 kW) and 125 lb⋅ft (169 N⋅m) torque. The 1984–1985 turbodiesels were fitted with a TD04 wastegated turbo which resulted in 86 hp (64 kW) and 134 lb⋅ft (182 N⋅m) torque.

Chrysler Australia launched the first generation in April 1979 as the MA series Chrysler D-50. Initially, two pickup versions were sold, the Commercial with the 1.6-litre Saturn (4G32) engine and the higher specification Recreational with the 2.0-litre Astron (4G52) engine. Both Commercials and Recreationals received a floor-shifted 4-speed manual, with a taller axle ratio for the Recreational. Commercials were specified with heavy duty suspension rated for 1,000-kilogram (2,200 lb) payloads; the Recreational version carries a 500-kilogram (1,100 lb) load. The reason for the halved payload was due to the sedan-type suspension of softer springs and more supple shock absorbers. The Recreational model also featured radial ply tires, electronic ignition, bucket seats, pile carpet, radio, floor console, sports steering wheel and an adjustable steering column as standard. An optional sports stripe package was also available. Options included a weather-tight, fibreglass canopy with foam rubber mattress. This was manufactured by Challenge Industries and incorporated sliding side windows. Later in 1979, a cab chassis body variant of the Commercial was released. In March 1980, the D-50 was renamed Chrysler L200 Express to form linkage with the newly released L300 Express vans. In October 1980, the Chrysler labelling made way for Mitsubishi badges following the establishment of Mitsubishi Motors Australia from Chrysler Australia's old operations. In June 1981, Mitsubishi released 4WD versions of the pickup and cab chassis, both with the 2.0-litre motor. Free-wheeling hubs to reduce noise and fuel use in 2WD mode were optional. In late 1981, the 2.0-litre with five-speed manual was made optional for the 2WD one-tonne suspension models.

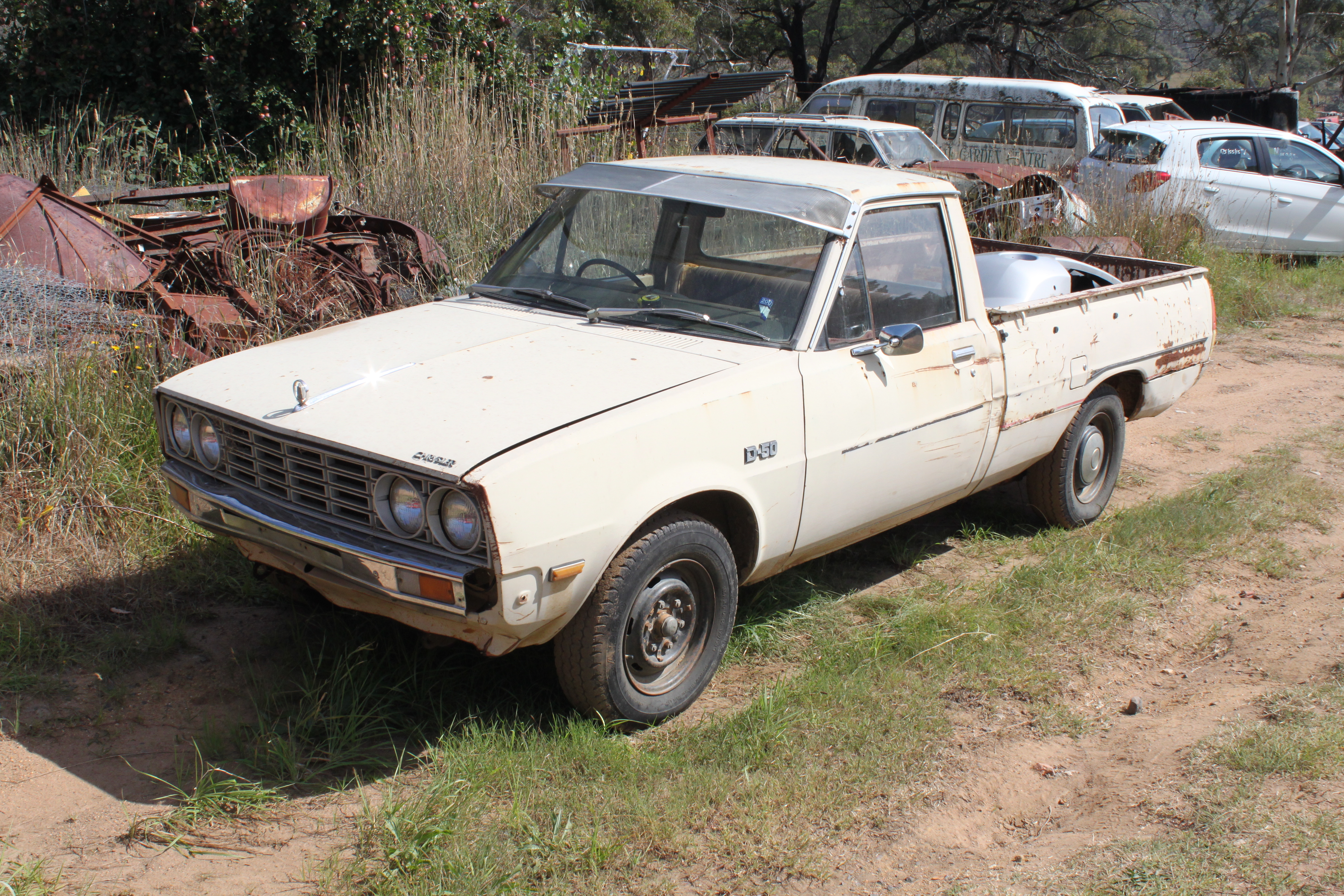
1979–1980 Chrysler D-50 (Australia)

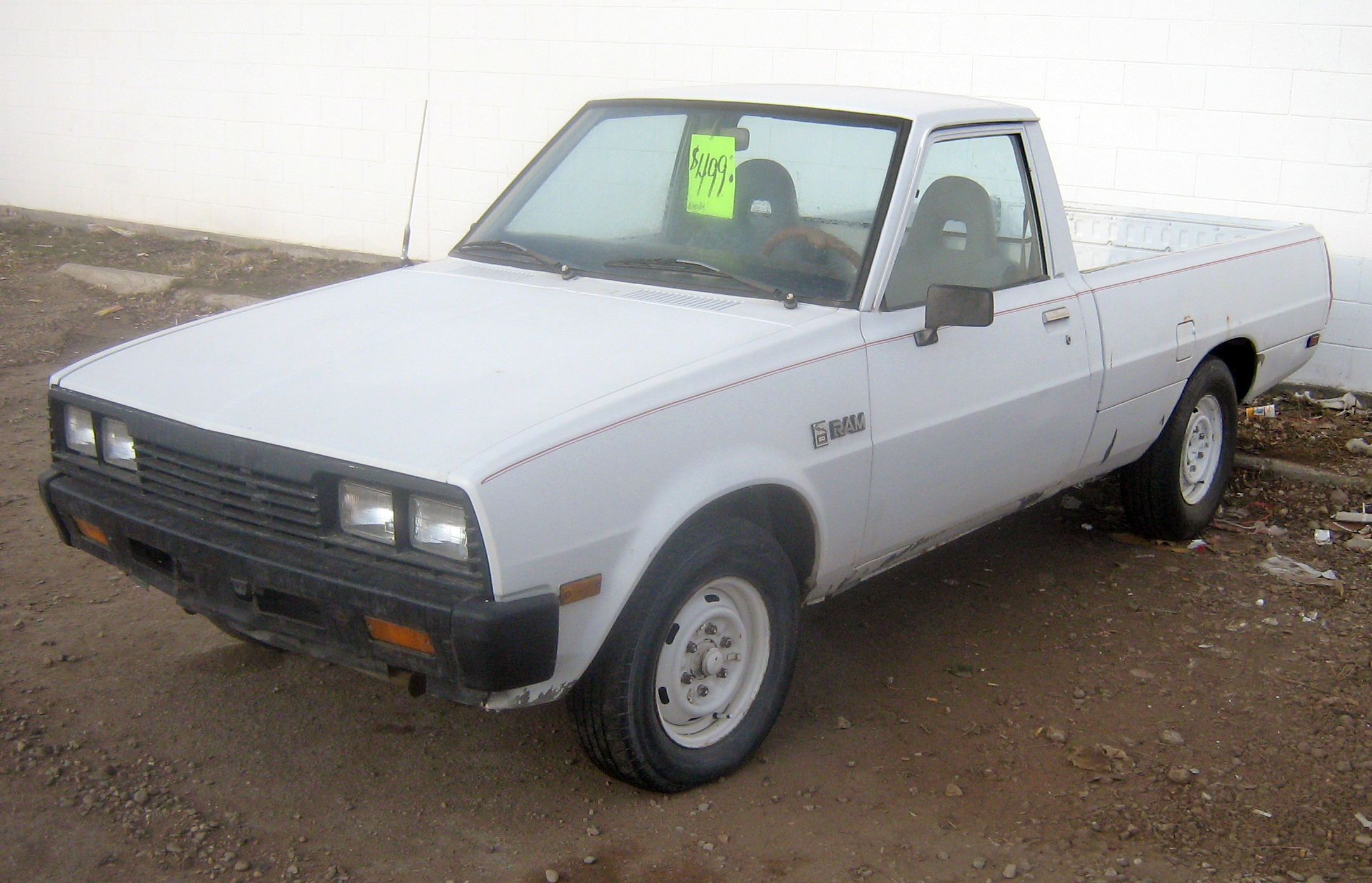
1983 Dodge Ram 50

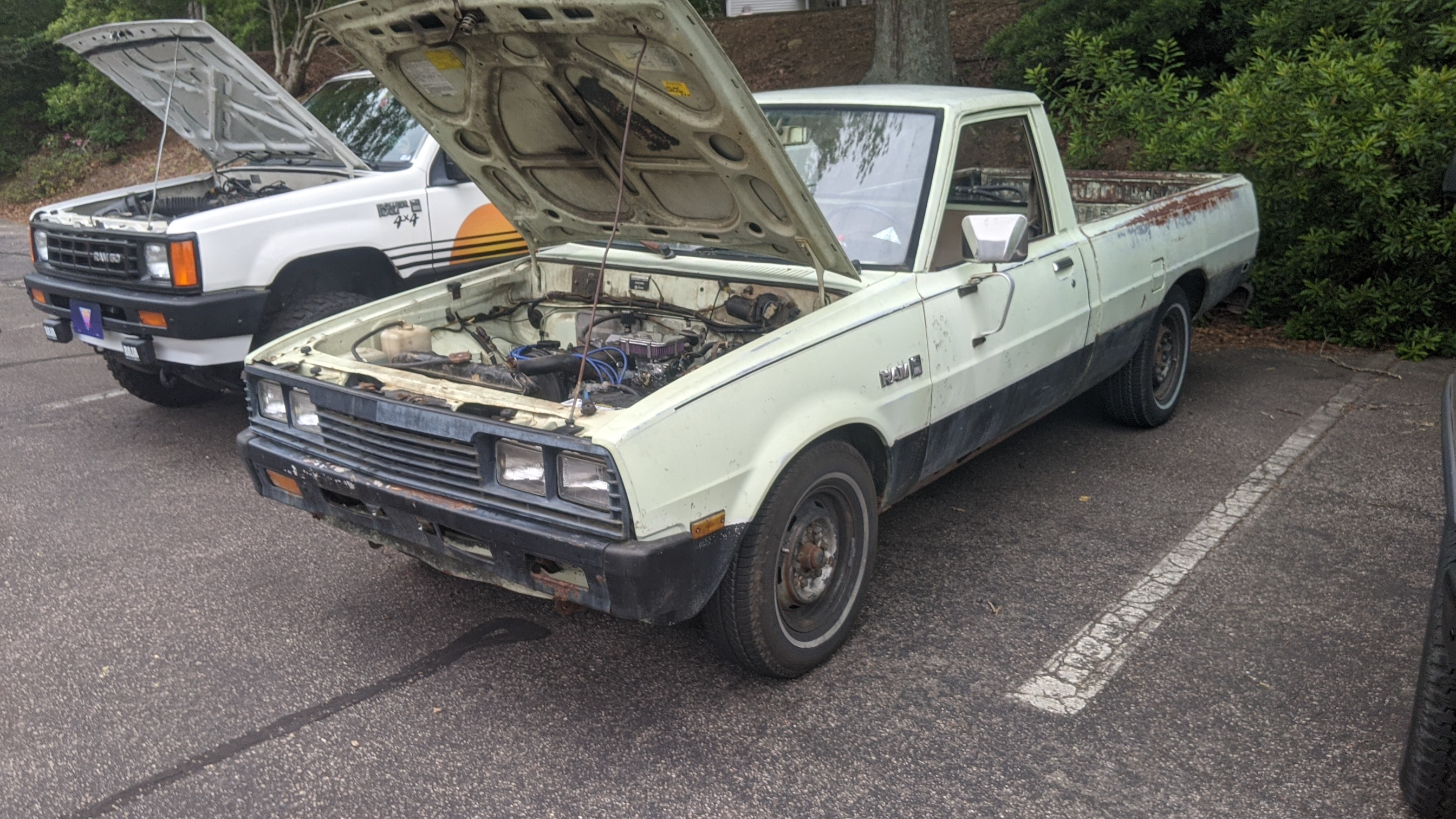
1985 Dodge Ram 50 alongside a second-gen Power Ram 50

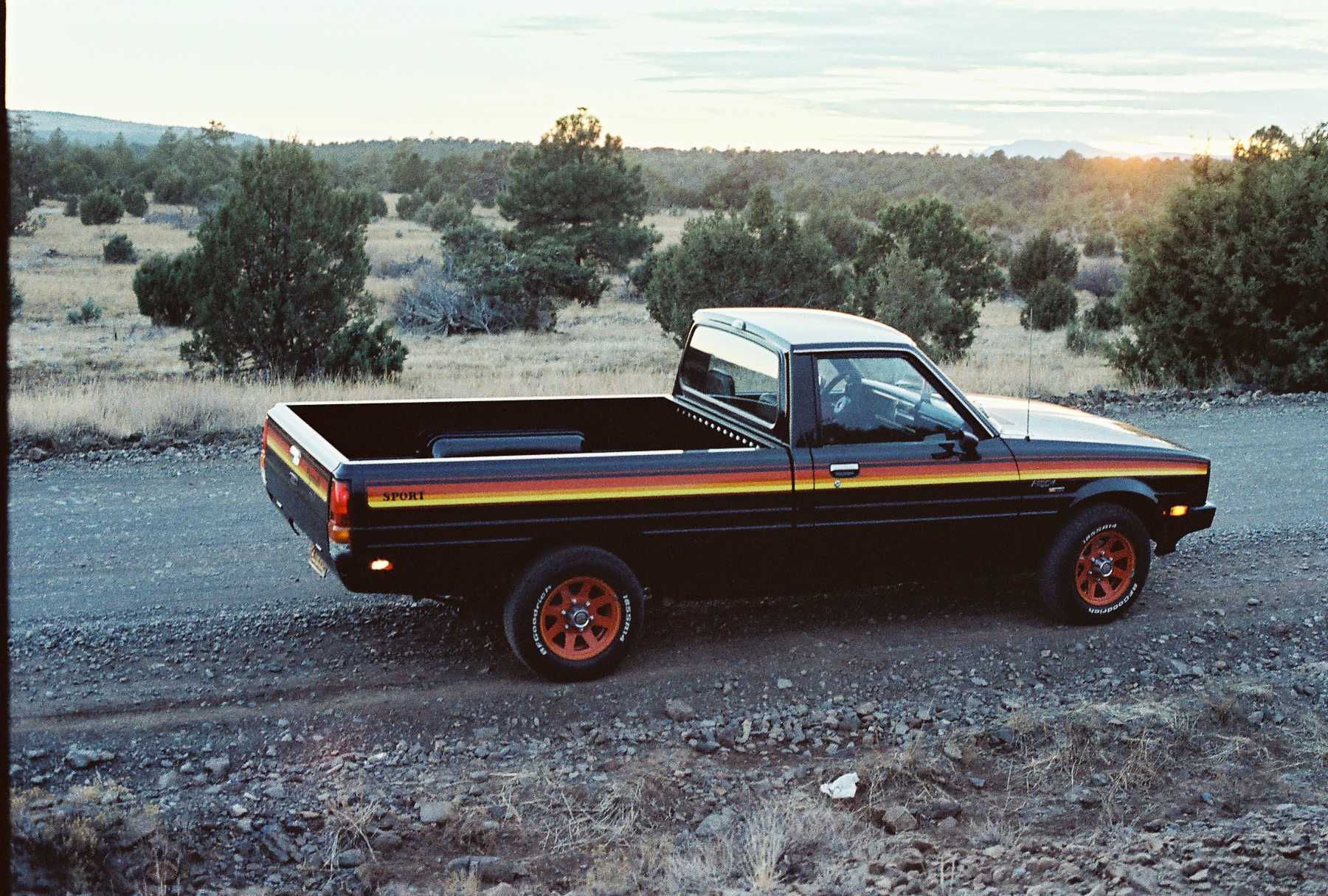
1979 Plymouth Arrow

== Second generation (K00/K10/K20/K30; 1986) ==
Second generation
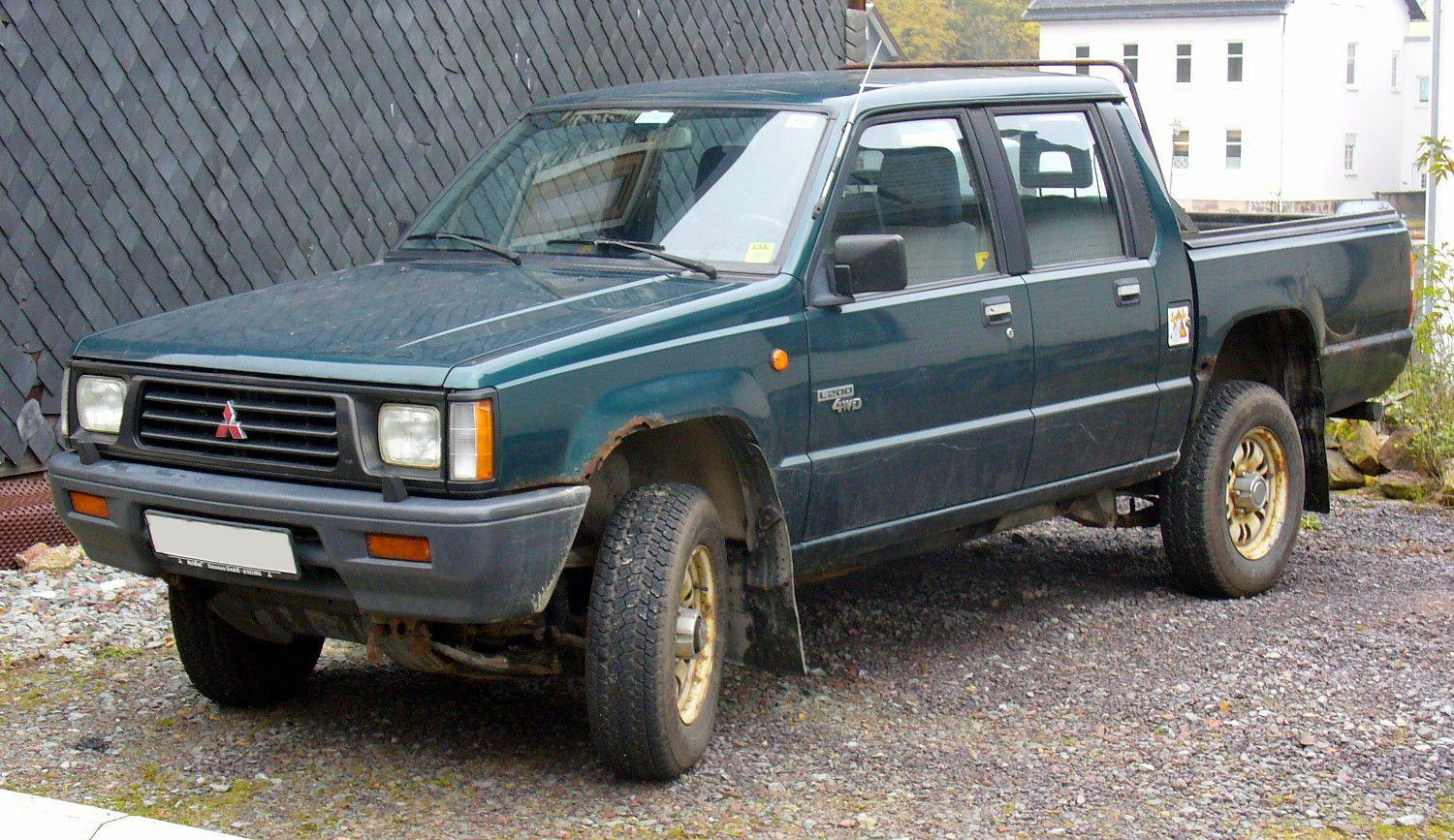

Overview
- Model code: K00/K10/K20/K30
- Also called: Dodge Ram 50 (1987–1993); Mitsubishi Cyclone (Thailand); Mitsubishi Colt (South Africa); Mitsubishi L200; Mitsubishi Mighty Max; Mitsubishi Strada
- Production: 1986–1996; 1999–2007 (Brazil)
- Assembly: Japan: Okazaki, Aichi (Nagoya plant); Philippines: Cainta; Brazil: Catalão (HPE); Portugal: Povos, Vila Franca de Xira; Thailand: Laem Chabang (MMTh); New Zealand: Porirua (MMNZ)

Body and chassis
- Body style: 2-door pickup 4-door pickup

Powertrain
- Engine: Petrol: 2.0 L G63B I4; 2.4 L 4G64 I4; 2.6 L 4G54 I4; 3.0 L 6G72 V6 (4WD only); Diesel: 2.5 L 4D56 I4; 2.5 L 4D56 turbo I4
- Transmission: 4-speed automatic 5-speed manual

Dimensions
- Wheelbase: Short Bed: 2,680 mm (105.5 in); Long Bed/Ext. Cab: 2,950 mm (116.1 in)
- Length: Short Bed: 177.2 in (4,501 mm); Long Bed/Ext. Cab: 193.7 in (4,920 mm); Ext. Cab: 188.2 in (4,780 mm)
- Width: 1,655 mm (65.2 in); Mighty Max 4WD: 65.9 in (1,674 mm); Mighty Max Sport Cab 4WD:
- Height: Short Bed: 58.5 in (1,486 mm); Long Bed/Ext. Cab: 59.3 in (1,506 mm); 1991–93 Ext. Cab: 59.7 in (1,516 mm); 1987–1990 Ext. Cab: 59.6 in (1,514 mm); 1991–93 Long Bed/Ext. Cab 4WD: 64.4 in (1,636 mm); 1989–1990: 58.3 in (1,481 mm)
- Curb weight: 1,220–1,635 kg (2,690–3,605 lb)

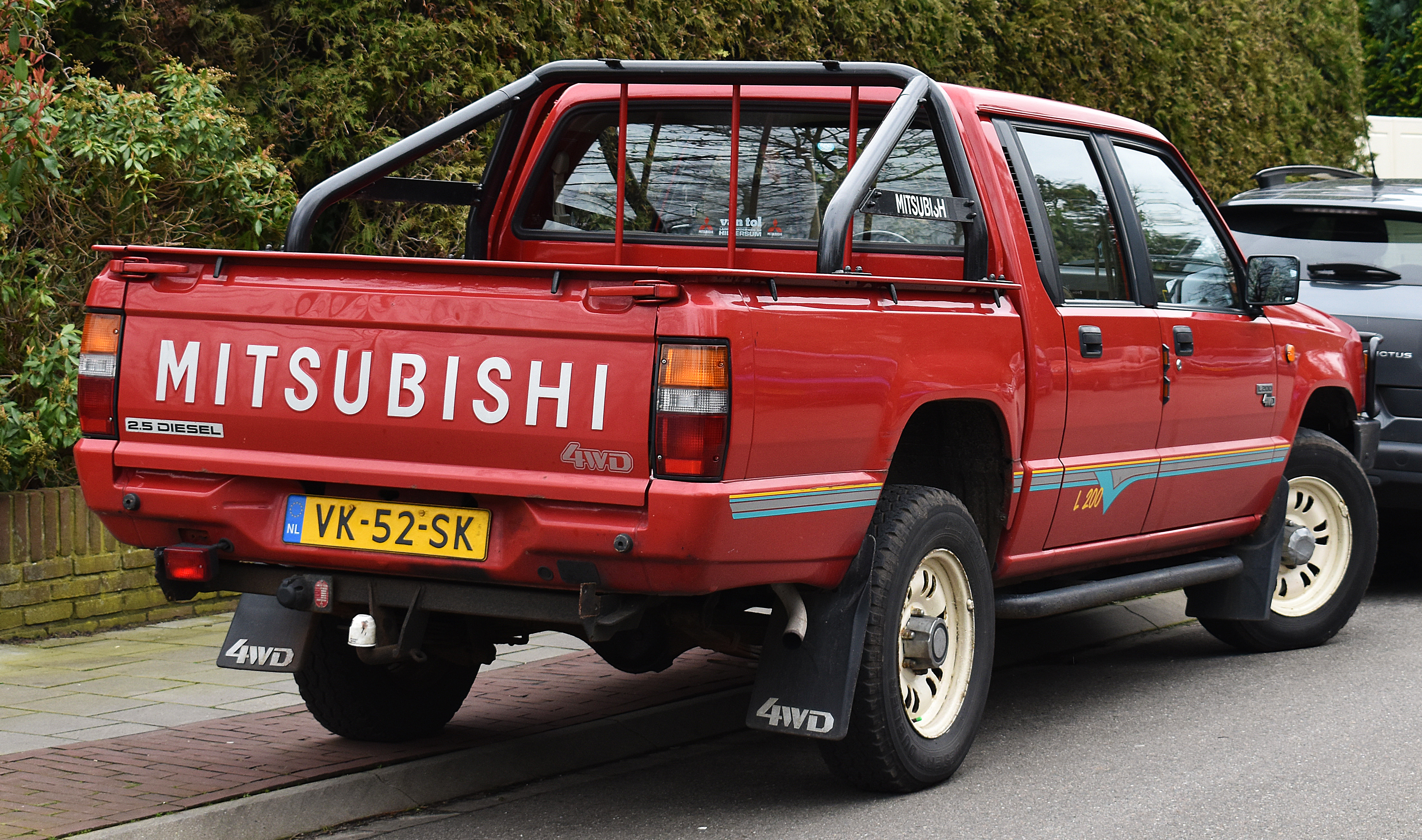
Mitsubishi L200 dual cab (Europe)

The second generation model was introduced in 1986 for most markets. In Australia, this model launched in October 1986 as the low-cost Triton. In Japan the pickups were not sold for a few years, making their return as the Strada in Japan in March 1991. A facelift took place for the 1993 model year, with a new grille and new plastic bumpers comprising most of the changes. It continued to be produced until 1996. Sales in the Japanese domestic market continued into the middle of 1997. The truck usually has a 68 hp (51 kW) 2.5 litre diesel or an 84 PS (62 kW) turbo diesel engine, with the turbo diesel being the only engine available in the Japanese home market. The Triton was not a spirited performer, with a four-wheel drive V6 model having a top speed of 126 km/h (78.1 mph). The second generation Mitsubishi truck was also produced in Thailand.

Starting out as a fairly utilitarian truck, more comfortable versions were gradually added in most markets. In Australia and New Zealand, a small, 3.0-litre, V6 engine with 90 kW (122 PS; 121 hp) was added in early 1993. The V6 was not a well liked engine specification by consumers, as it did not tow as well or make as much torque as the diesel four-cylinder engine did, and used much more fuel than the four-cylinder. The 3.0L V6 6G72 equipped models also had a flaw in the design of the engine lifters- noisy lifters resulted in catastrophic engine failure over time. The locally developed L200 Sport range, more stylish and often featuring two-tone paint, was very popular in New Zealand where the L200 was offered with five different engines.

=== North America ===
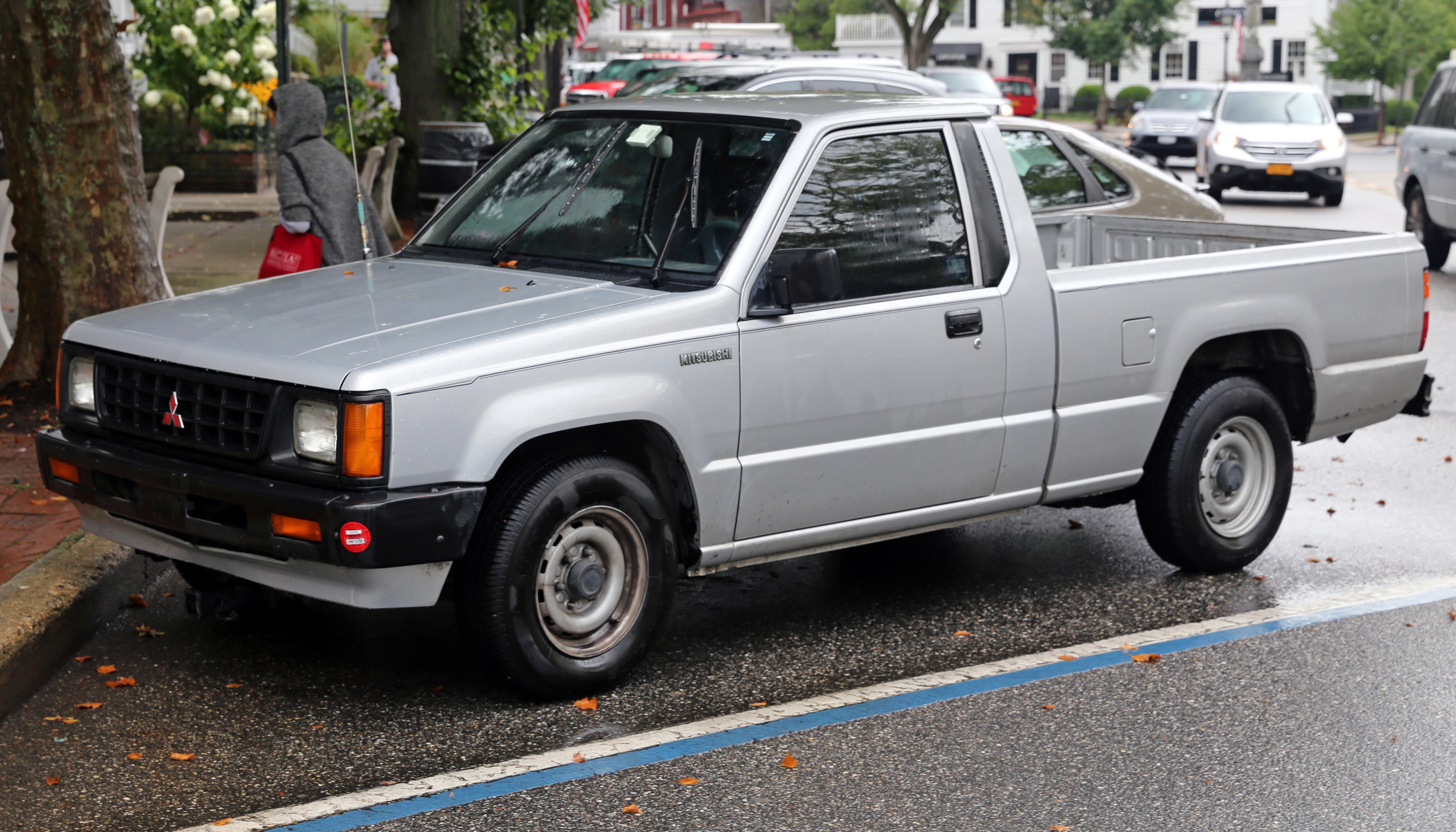
1992 Mitsubishi Mighty Max (US)

In the US it was known as the Mitsubishi Mighty Max or the Dodge Ram 50. Petrol engines include a carburetted 92 hp (69 kW) 2.0-litre inline-four or a 2.6-litre inline-four with 109 hp (81 kW). Four-wheel drive (non-LSD) was also available, as were a four-speed automatic transmission, two bed lengths, and both regular and Macrocab (extended cab) options. There was also a higher-rated One-Ton model available on regular cab models with the longer bed; the automatic shifter was relocated to the column.

In later years the standard engine was switched to a 2.4-litre inline-four producing 116 hp (87 kW). This engine was made standard fitment on all two-wheel drive Mighty Maxes for the 1991 model year, while four-wheel drives all received the recently introduced 3.0-litre V6 with 143 hp (107 kW).

==== Dodge Ram 50 ====
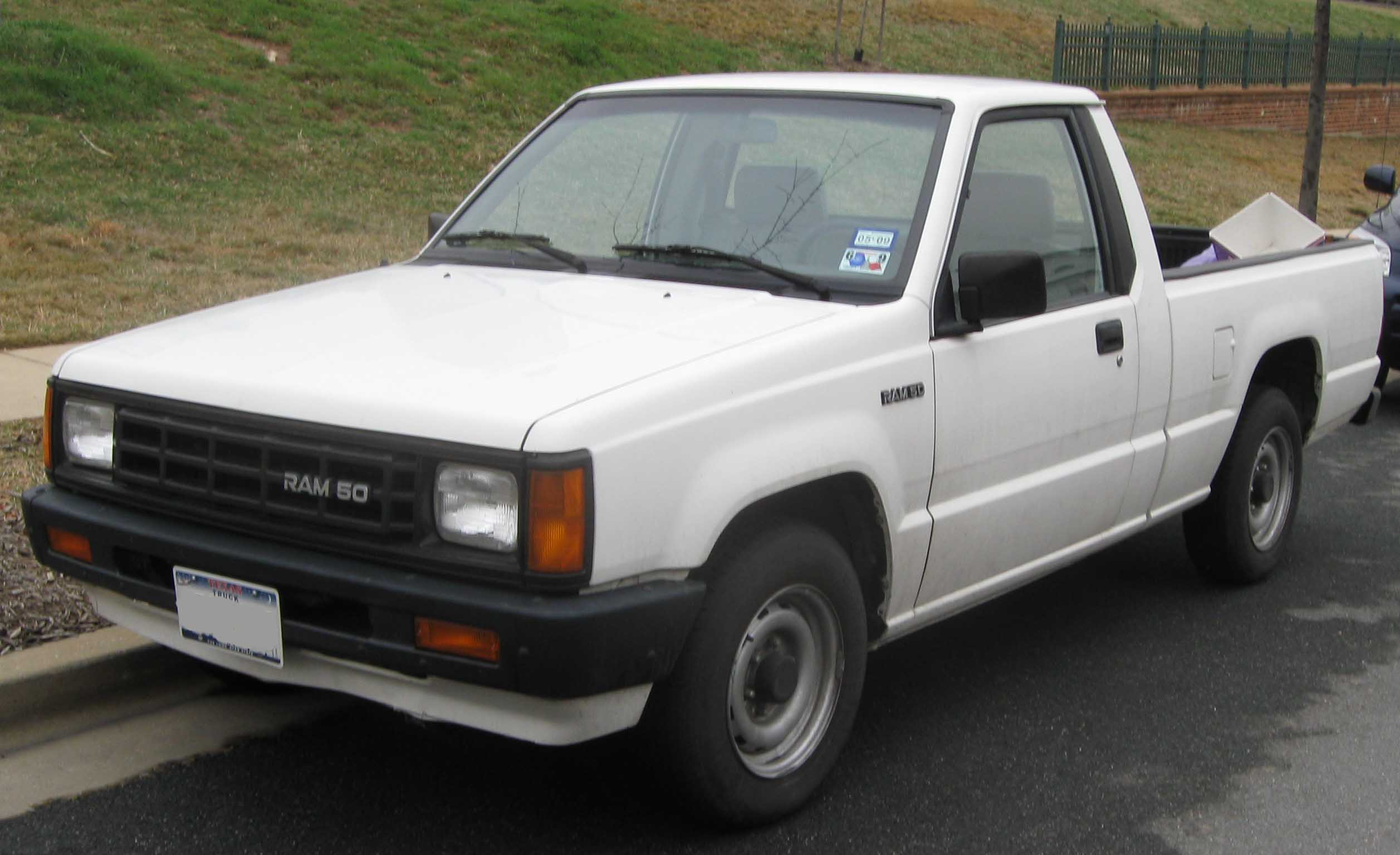
Dodge Ram 50 (US)

The Ram 50 was redesigned for 1987, which was the same year Chrysler introduced the Ram 50's successor, the Dodge Dakota. Despite this, sales of the Ram 50 continued for another seven years until 1994, possibly because the Ram 50 was a compact and the Dakota was a mid-size. The difference in size and cost left a niche for the Ram 50, and its cancellation may have been due more to a desire to show independence from Mitsubishi than because of any product overlap. The Mighty Max was taken off the US market after the 1996 model year, and its successor was not marketed in North America due to poor sales.

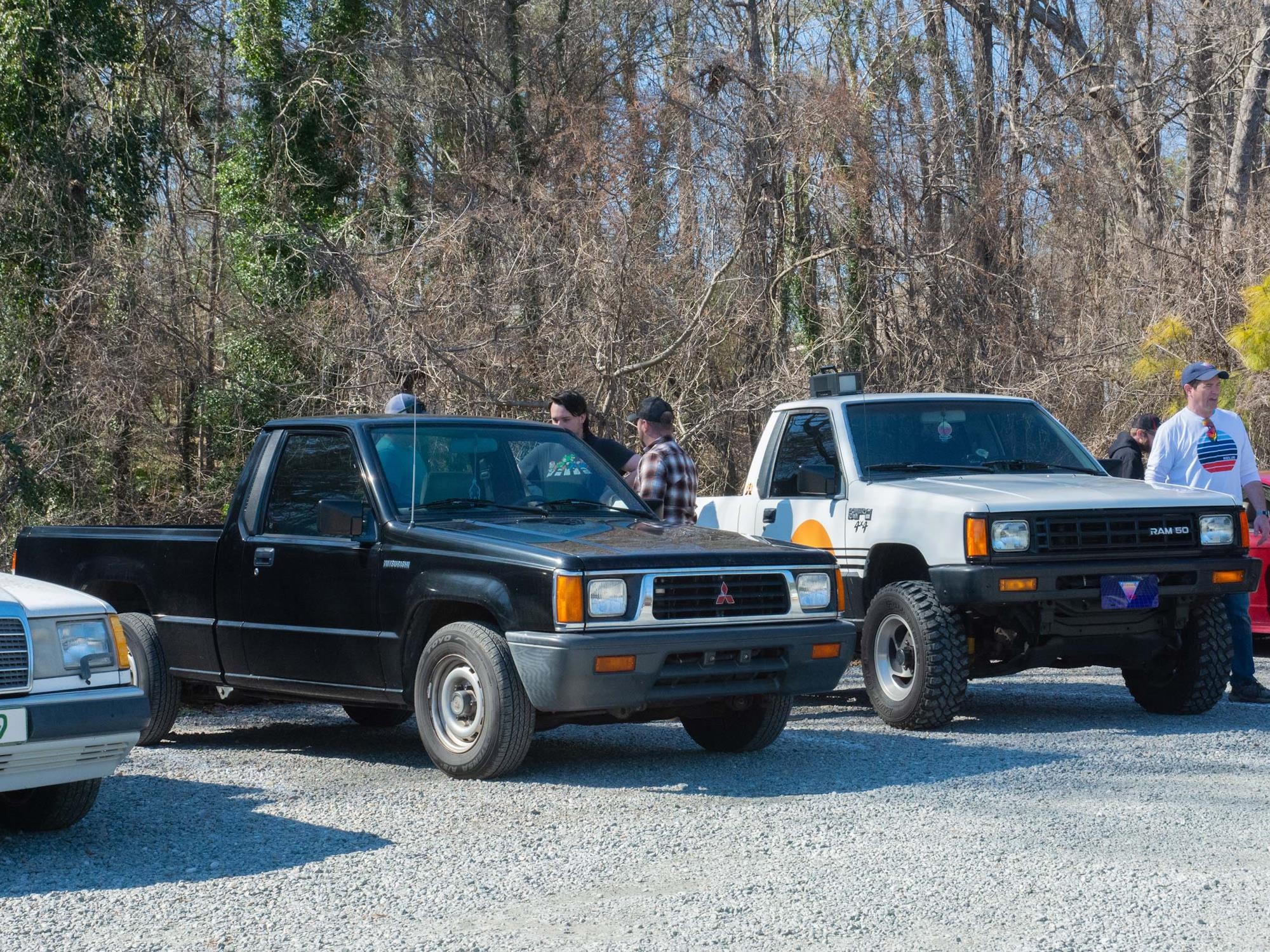
Mitsubishi Mighty Max and Dodge Ram 50

The Ram 50 underwent facelifts and modifications corresponding to those of the Mighty Max, with a choice of 6 ft (1.8 m) or 7.5 ft (2.3 m) bed lengths and regular or extended Sports Cabs.

== Third generation (K50/K60/K70; 1996) ==
Third generation
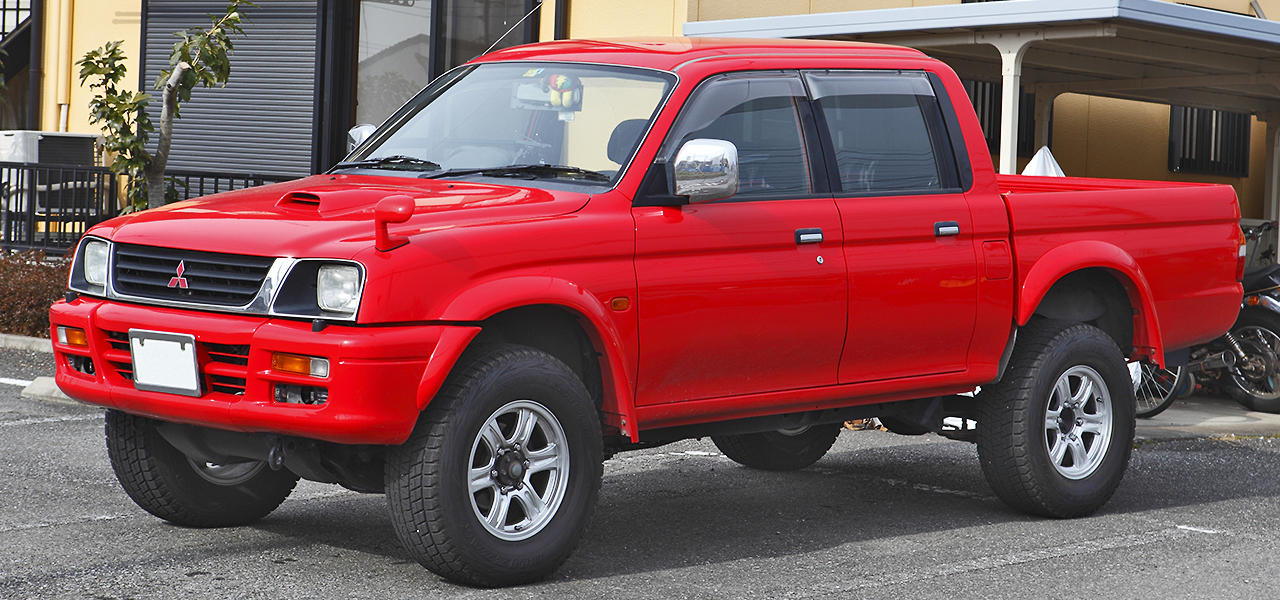
- Mitsubishi Strada (Japan; pre-facelift)

Overview
- Model code: K50/K60/K70
- Also called: Mitsubishi Colt (South Africa); Mitsubishi L200; Mitsubishi Storm (Malaysia); Mitsubishi L200 Endeavor (Philippines); Mitsubishi Strada (Japan, Philippines, Thailand, Laos); Mitsubishi Magnum (Israel: pre-facelift); Mitsubishi Mega Magnum (Israel: facelift); Mitsubishi Strakar (Portugal)
- Production: 1996–2006; 2004–2012 (Brazil)
- Assembly: Japan: Okazaki, Aichi (Okazaki Plant); Thailand: Laem Chabang (MMTh); Brazil: Catalão (HPE); Philippines: Cainta (MMPC); South Africa: East London (Mercedes-Benz South Africa: 1994–2008); Malaysia: Pekan, Pahang (AMM)

Body and chassis
- Body style: 2-door pickup 4-door pickup
- Related: Mitsubishi Pajero Sport (first generation)

Powertrain
- Engine: Petrol: 2.0 L 4G63 I4; 2.4 L 4G64 I4; 3.0 L 6G72 V6; Diesel: 2.5 L 4D56 I4; 2.5 L 4D56 turbo I4; 2.8 L 4M40 I4; 2.8 L 4M40 turbo I4
- Transmission: 5-speed manual 4-speed automatic

Dimensions
- Wheelbase: 2,950 mm (116.1 in)
- Length: 4,935 mm (194.3 in)
- Width: 1,695 mm (66.7 in)
- Height: 1,585–1,710 mm (62.4–67.3 in)
- Curb weight: 1,295–1,700 kg (2,855–3,748 lb)

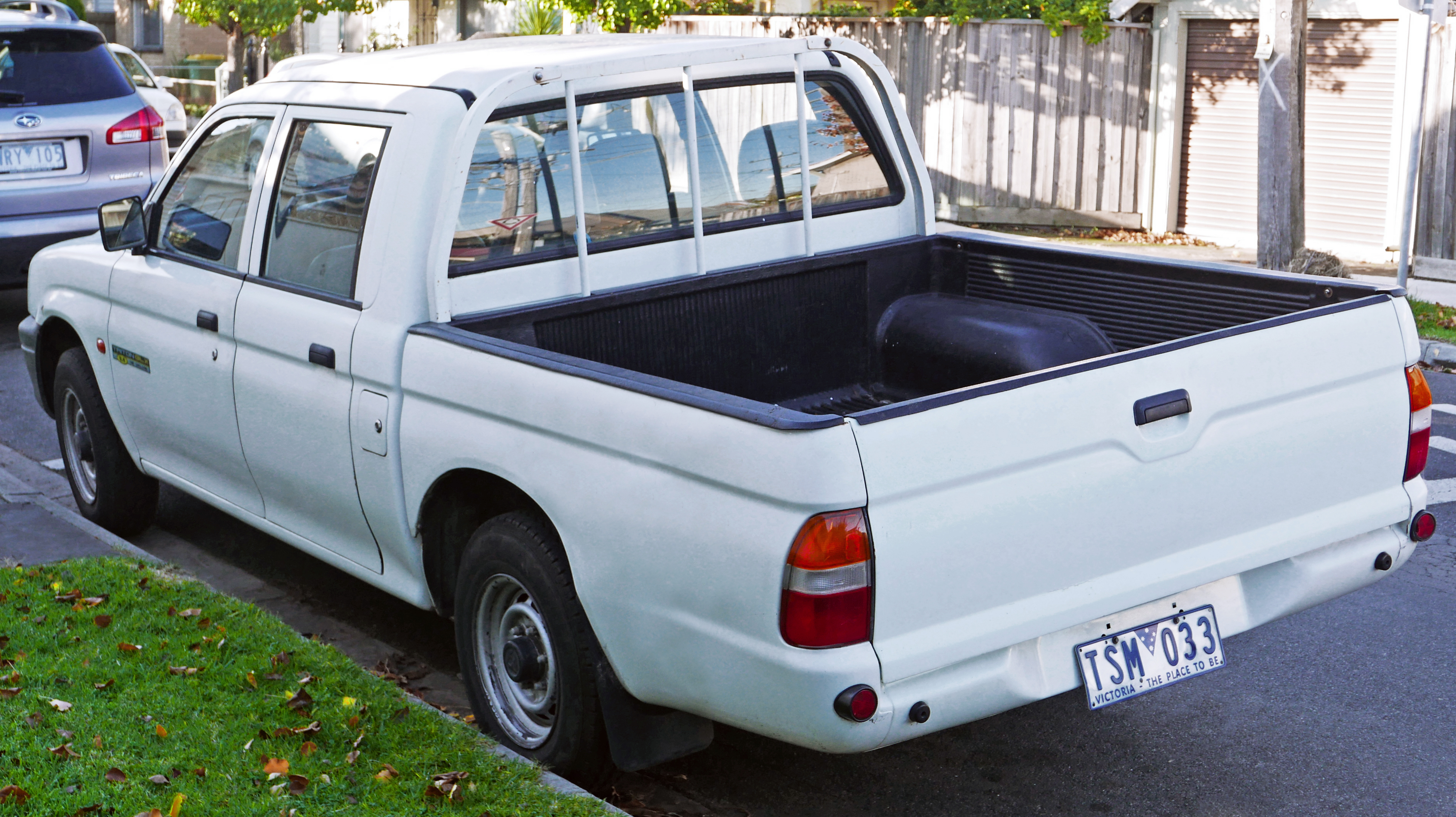
Mitsubishi Triton GLX utility (Australia; pre-facelift)

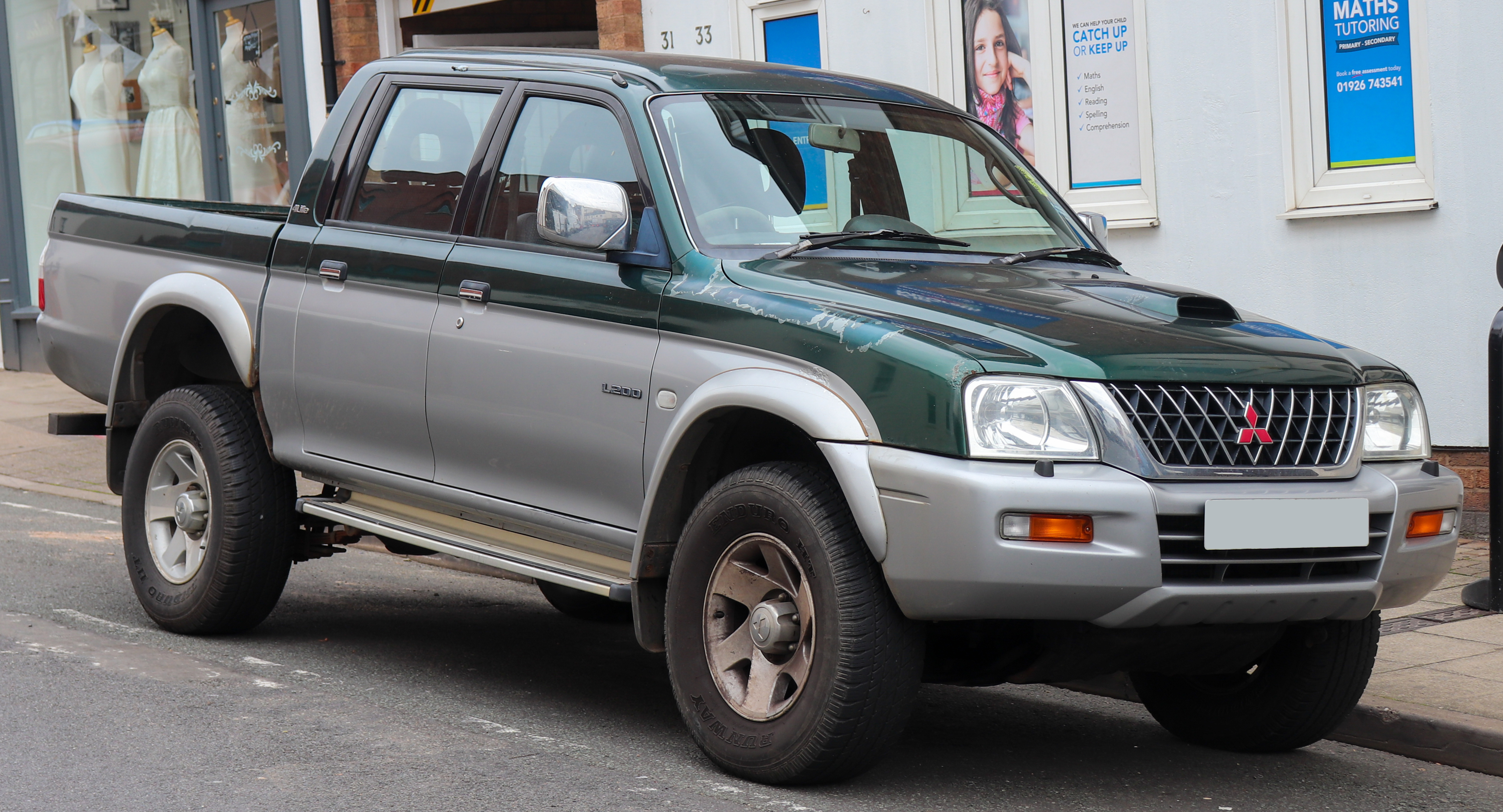

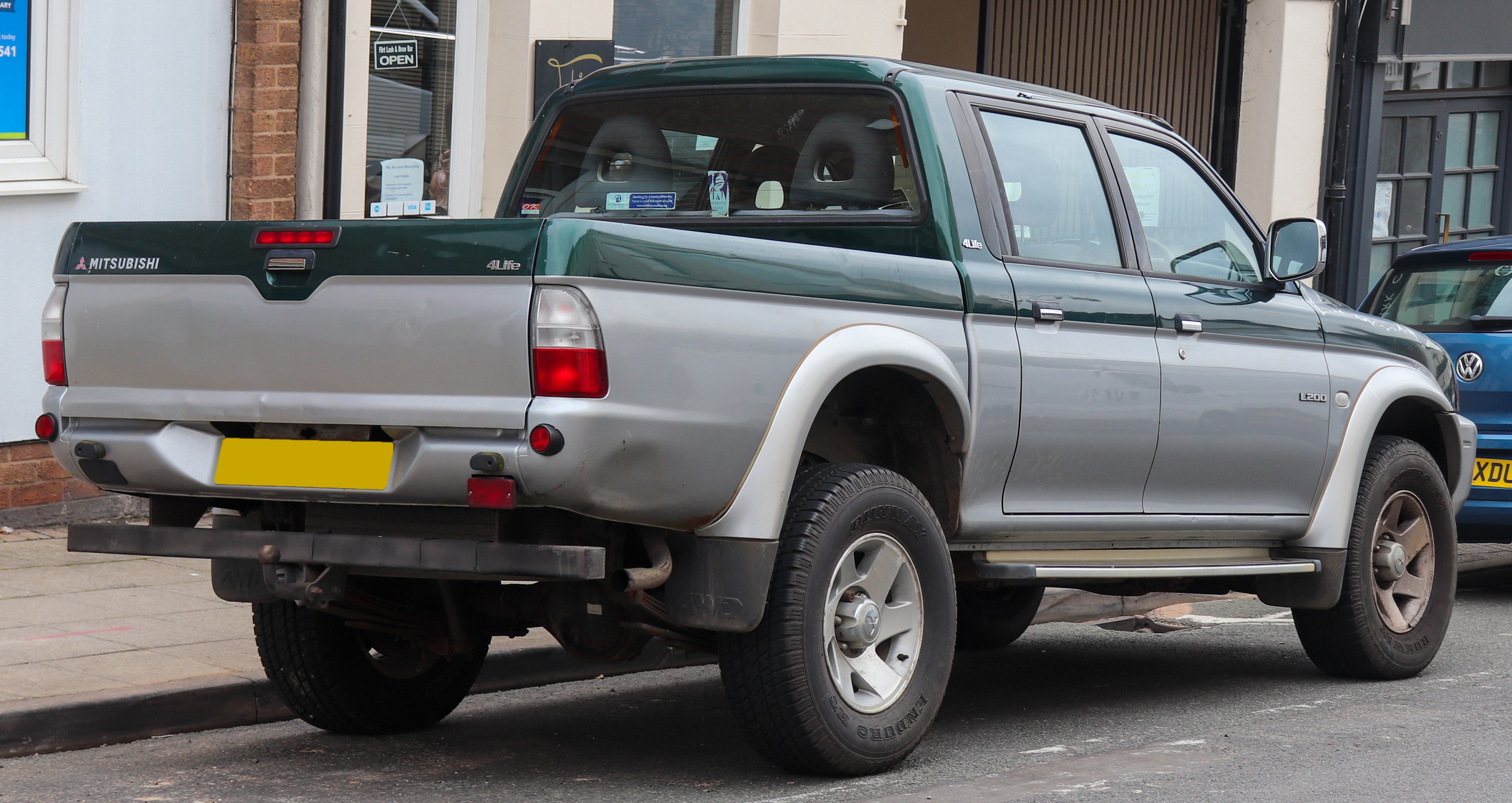
2002 Mitsubishi L200 4Life 4WD 2.5 (UK; facelift)

In 1996, a new generation model was introduced with 2.5-litre turbodiesel engines developing 103 hp (77 kW). Other engine options include two sixteen-valve fuel injected gasoline engines and a naturally aspirated diesel. The previous 2.6-litre unit was replaced with a new, considerably more powerful 2.4-litre engine with 145 hp (108 kW). The car participated in the Dakar Rally in 2005. Production ended in 2006. These were only built in Laem Chabang, Thailand, and were also exported to Japan between 1997 and 1999. The Japanese sales discontinued after these three years due to shifting emissions and customer preference in Japan in the 1990s. In late 2001 the third generation pickup underwent a facelift with new headlights and other changes.

An SUV model developed from the Mitsubishi Triton, called the Mitsubishi Challenger was released to Japan in 1996. In overseas markets it was also badged Montero Sport, Pajero Sport, Shogun Sport, or Nativa. Challenger shares many components and some body panels (i.e. front doors) with the Strada pickup truck and utilises the second generation Mitsubishi Pajero wheelbase. The Challenger was also produced in Thailand as the Mitsubishi Strada G-Wagon. The Thai model, unlike the same vehicle manufactured elsewhere used the same front styling as the Strada pickup truck that it was based upon. It was retired from production in 2005, but the Challenger nameplate was resurrected for the second generation of the Mitsubishi Pajero Sport, launched in 2008 and which is also based on the following generation of the Mitsubishi Triton.

=== Safety ===
ANCAP test results* Mitsubishi Triton GLX 4x2 single cab chassis (2002)
Test	Score
Overall	2 /5 stars
Frontal offset	3.80/16
Side impact	10.18/16
Pole	Not Assessed
Seat belt reminders	0/3
Whiplash protection	Not Assessed
Pedestrian protection	Not Assessed
Electronic stability control	Not Assessed

== Fourth generation (KA/KB; 2005) ==
Fourth generation
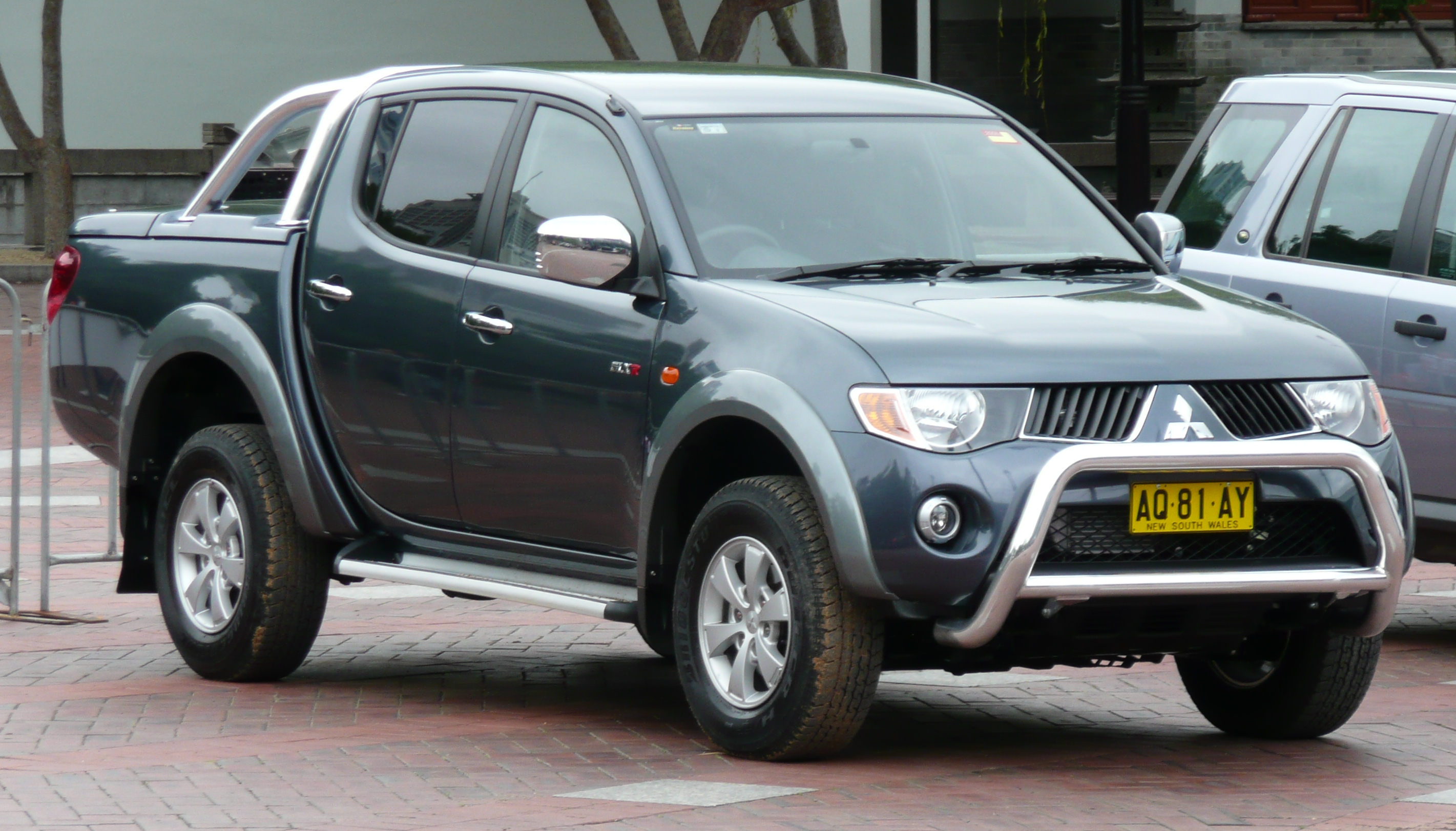
- Mitsubishi Triton GLX-R dual cab (pre-facelift, Australia)

Overview
- Model code: KA/KB
- Also called: Mitsubishi L200; Mitsubishi Strada (Philippines); Mitsubishi Strada Triton (Indonesia); Mitsubishi L200 Triton (Brazil); Mitsubishi Sportero; Mitsubishi Hunter (Israel); Mitsubishi Strakar (Portugal)
- Production: 2005–2015; 2005–2017 (Brazil)
- Assembly: Thailand: Laem Chabang (MMTh); Brazil: Catalão (HPE); South Africa: East London (Mercedes-Benz South Africa: 2008–2011)
- Designer: Akinori Nakanishi

Body and chassis
- Body style: 2-door pickup 4-door pickup
- Related: Mitsubishi Pajero Sport (second generation)

Powertrain
- Engine: Petrol/CNG: 2.4 L 4G64 I4; 2.4 L 4G64 petrol/CNG I4; 3.5 L 6G74 V6; Diesel: 2.5 L 4D56 I4; 2.5 L 4D56 turbo I4; 2.8 L 4M40 I4; 3.2 L 4M41 turbo I4
- Transmission: 5-speed manual 4-speed automatic 5-speed automatic
- Hybrid drivetrain: Bi-Fuel system (Triton CNG)

Dimensions
- Wheelbase: 3,000 mm (118.1 in)
- Length: 5,040 mm (198.4 in); FBB: 4,835 mm (190.4 in); Crew Cab: 5,115 mm (201.4 in)
- Width: 1,750 mm (68.9 in); Crew Cab: 1,800 mm (70.9 in)
- Height: 1,655 mm (65.2 in); Crew Cab: 1,775 mm (69.9 in); 4x4: 1,780 mm (70.1 in)

The fourth generation Triton was released in 2005. Designed by Akinori Nakanishi, it was built exclusively by Mitsubishi's subsidiary in Thailand and was exported to 140 global markets. It was mostly known as L200 except for Japan and its subsidiary countries' markets. The car had a 2.5-litre turbo-diesel engine developing 134 kW (180 hp). The base version, available in some markets such as the Dominican Republic, had a 2.5-litre normally aspirated diesel engine and the L200 off-road version called the Savana had 200 hp.

In Japan, the Triton was exclusively equipped with 3.5-litre petrol engine and 4-speed automatic transmission and was sold from 2006 to 2011 - the only pickup truck in the market at that time (excluding kei trucks). Despite its success overseas, it was a critical failure in Japan as workmen and traders preferred vans and station wagons. As a result, in August 2011 the Triton was pulled out from Mitsubishi's Japanese lineup.

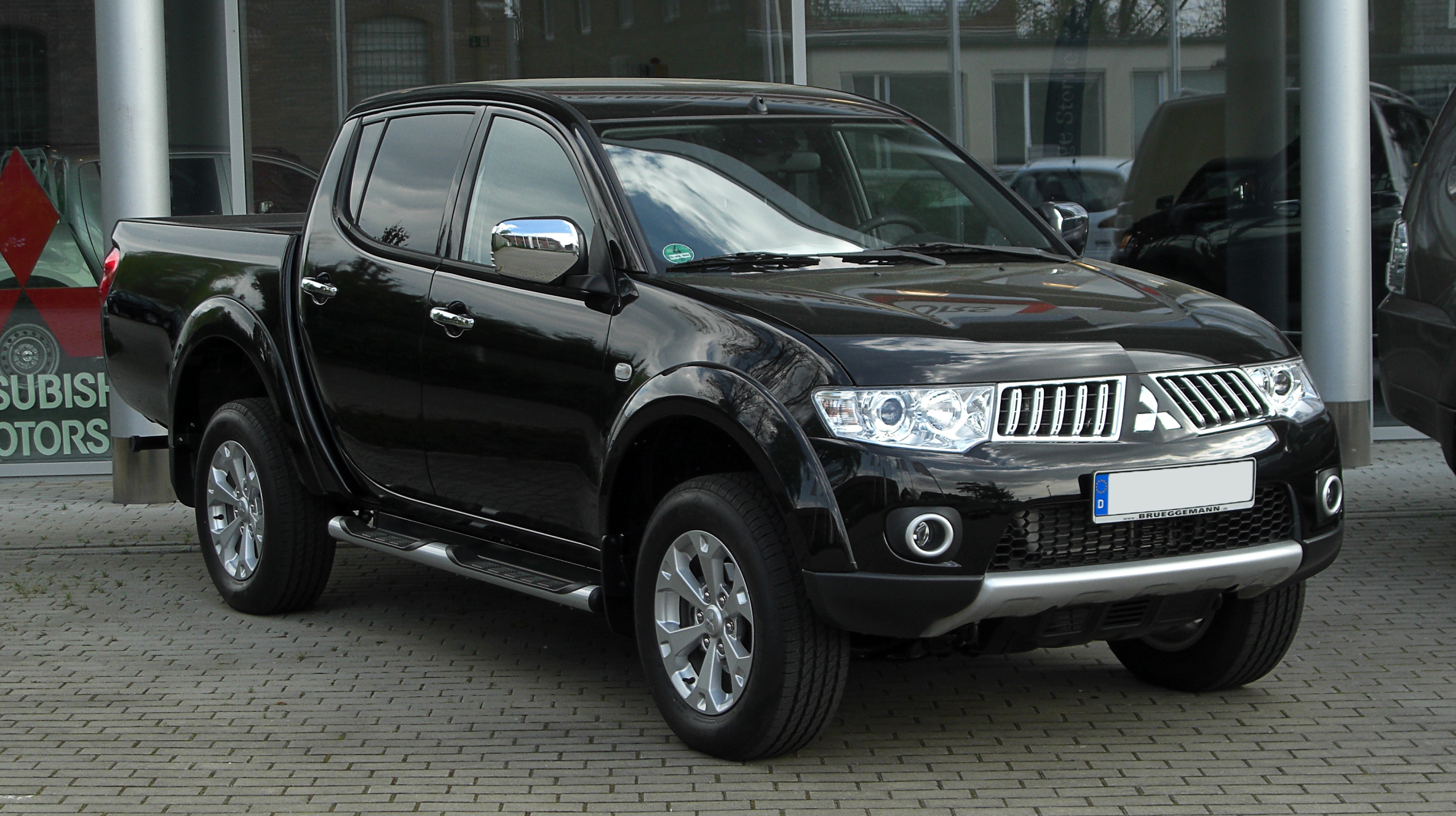
2011 Mitsubishi L200 (first facelift, Europe)

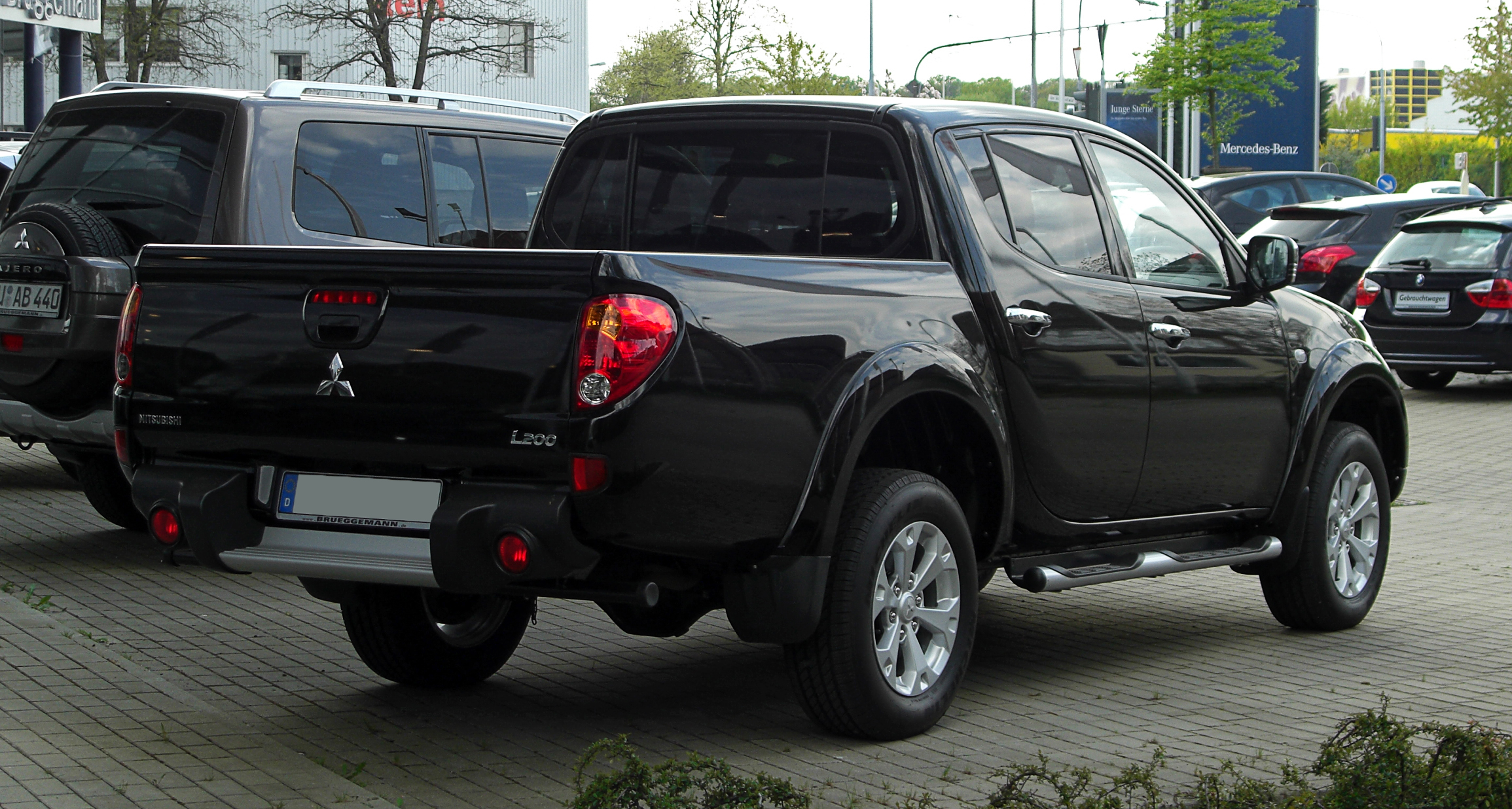
2011 Mitsubishi L200 (first facelift, Europe)

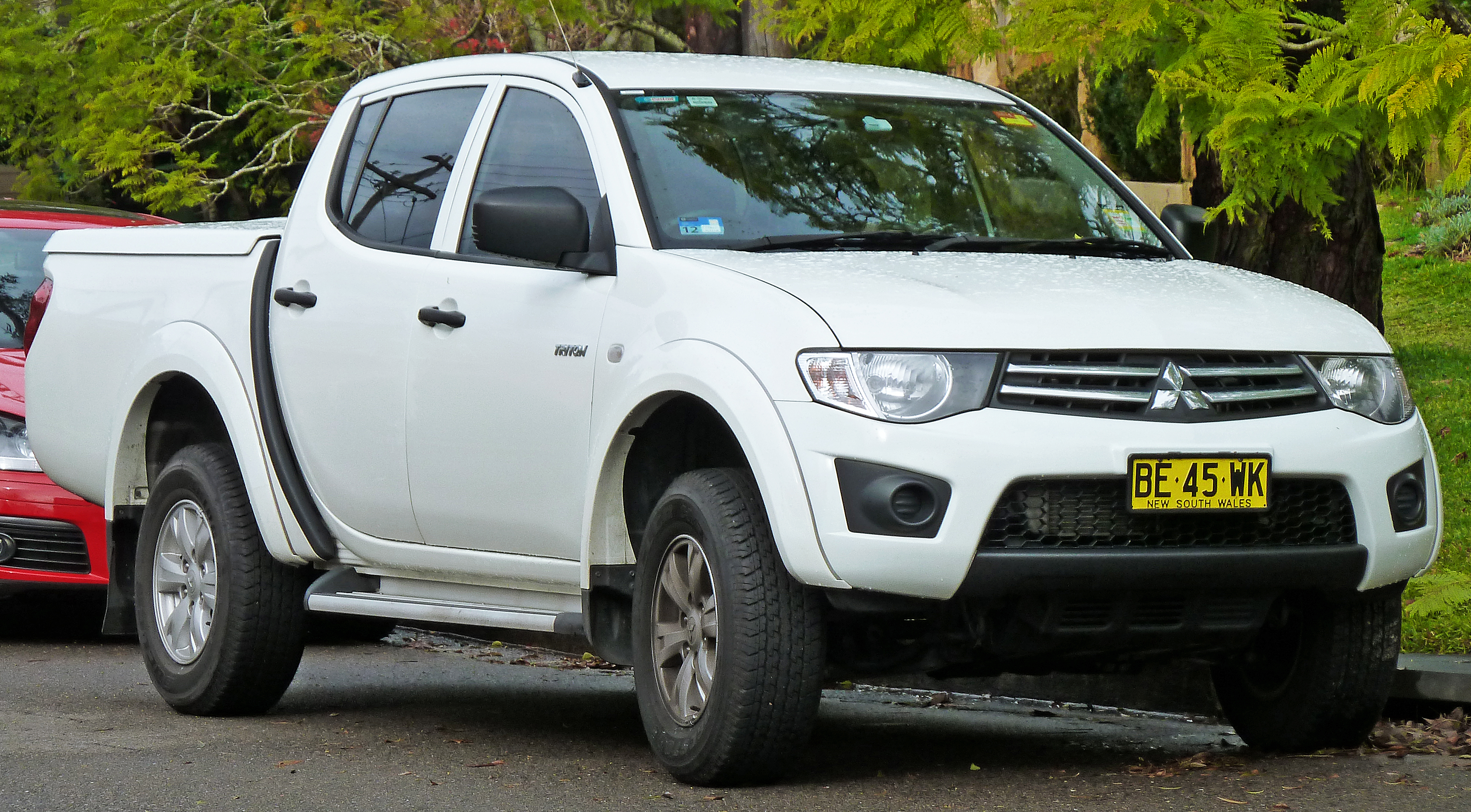
Mitsubishi Triton dual cab (second facelift, Australia)

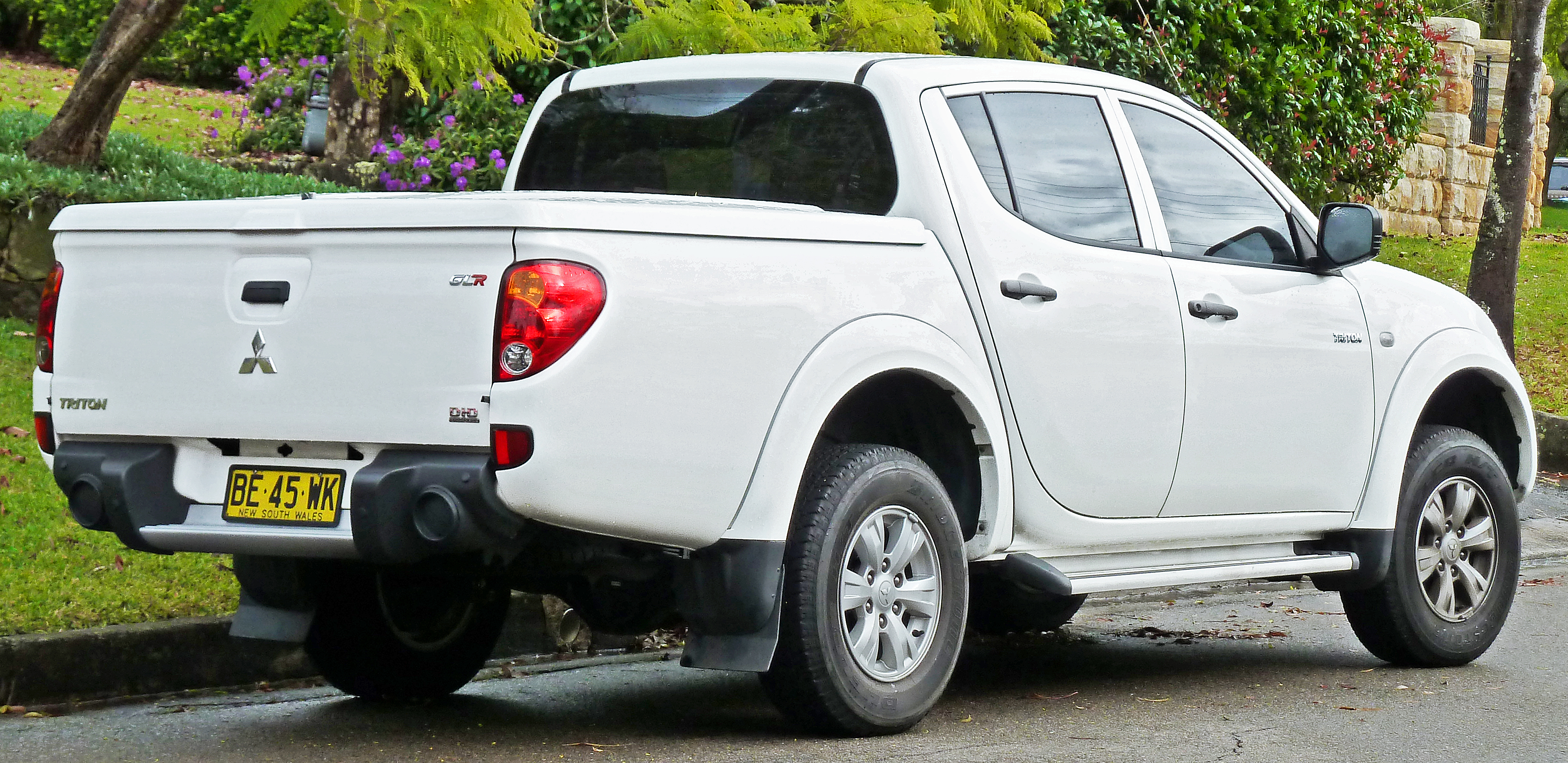
Mitsubishi Triton dual cab (second facelift, Australia)

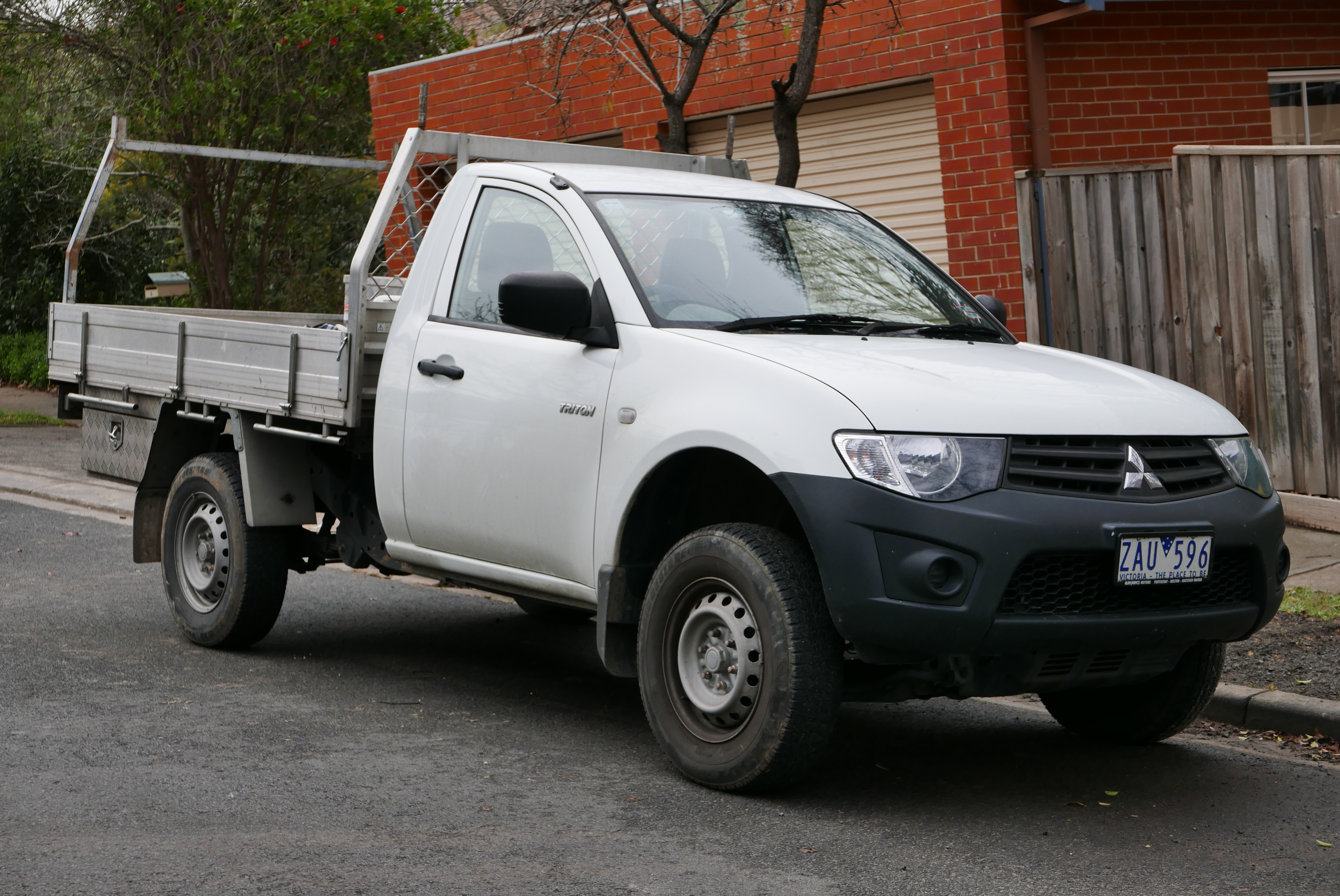
Mitsubishi Triton GL cab chassis (second facelift, Australia)

=== Safety ===
ANCAP test results* Mitsubishi Triton all variants (2006)
Test	Score
Overall	4 /5 stars
Frontal offset	9.08/16
Side impact	16/16
Pole	Not Assessed
Seat belt reminders	0/3
Whiplash protection	Not Assessed
Pedestrian protection	Poor
Electronic stability control	Optional

ANCAP test results* Mitsubishi Triton GLX 4x4 dual cab (2006)
Test	Score
Overall	4 /5 stars
Frontal offset	9.08/16
Side impact	16/16
Pole	Not Assessed
Seat belt reminders	0/3
Whiplash protection	Not Assessed
Pedestrian protection	Poor
Electronic stability control	Not Available

== Fifth generation (KJ/KK/KL; 2014) ==
Fifth generation
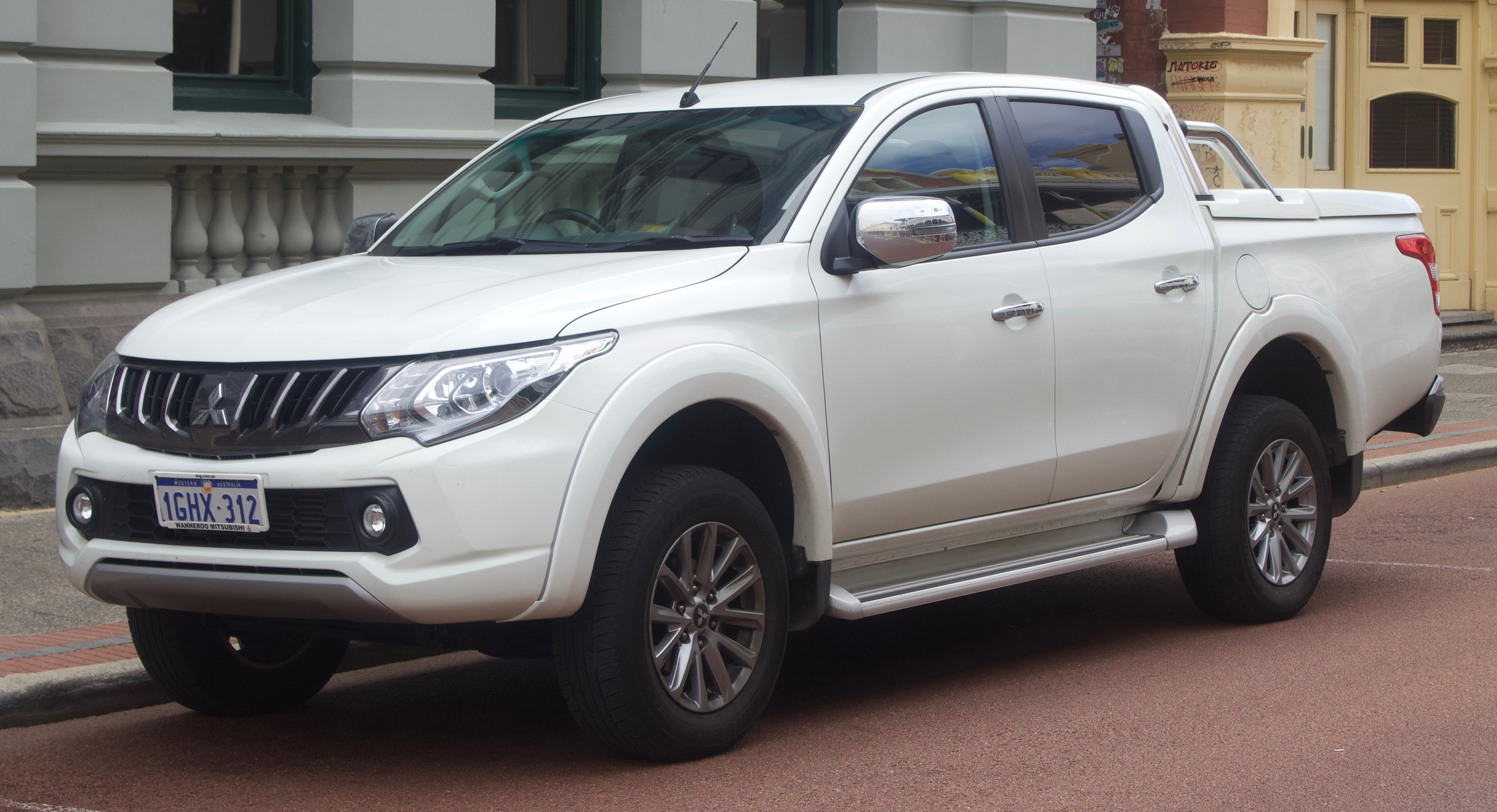
- Mitsubishi Triton GLS (pre-facelift)

Overview
- Model code: KJ/KK/KL
- Also called: Mitsubishi L200; Mitsubishi Strada; Mitsubishi L200 Triton (Brazil); Fiat Fullback; RAM 1200
- Production: 2014–2023; 2016–2026 (Brazil)
- Assembly: Thailand: Laem Chabang (MMTh); Brazil: Catalão (HPE)
- Designer: Tsunehiro Kunimoto (facelift)

Body and chassis
- Body style: 2-door pickup 4-door pickup
- Related: Mitsubishi Pajero Sport (third generation)

Powertrain
- Engine: Petrol: 2.4 L 4G64 I4; Diesel: 2.3 L 4N14 turbo I4; 2.4 L 4N15 MIVEC turbo I4; 2.4 L 4N15 turbo I4; 2.5 L 4D56 VGT I4; 2.5 L 4D56 turbo I4; 2.5 L 4D56 non-intercooled turbo I4 (HD-X trim, Indonesia/Triton Quest, Malaysia)
- Transmission: 6-speed manual 5-speed manual 5-speed automatic 6-speed Aisin R6AWH / V6AWH automatic

Dimensions
- Wheelbase: 3,000 mm (118.1 in)
- Length: 5,210–5,300 mm (205.1–208.7 in)
- Width: 1,815–1,820 mm (71.5–71.7 in)
- Height: 1,780–1,795 mm (70.1–70.7 in)

In 2014, Mitsubishi unveiled the fifth-generation Triton/L200/Strada which went on sale in early 2015 (Asia-Pacific) and late 2015 (Europe and the Caribbean).

Since 2015, the current generation L200 shares the same underpinnings as the newly rebadged Fiat Fullback intended for the European and Middle East markets. Fiat Chrysler Automobiles did not introduce the Fullback in the North American market due to the U.S. chicken tax as well as the introduction of the Jeep Gladiator, based on the fourth-generation Jeep Wrangler. For the 2017 model year, Ram Trucks rebadged the Triton as the Ram 1200 for the Middle East market.

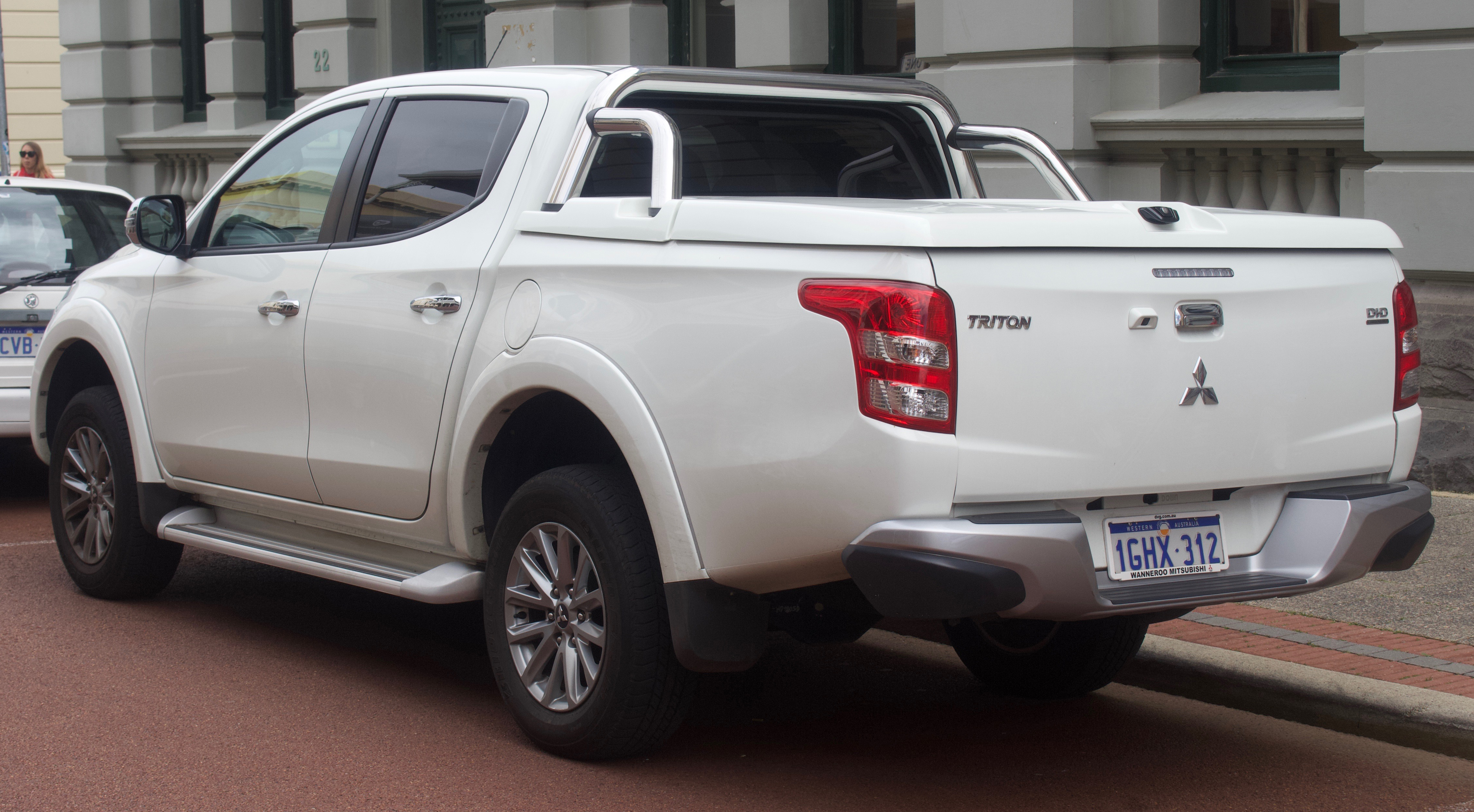
Rear view

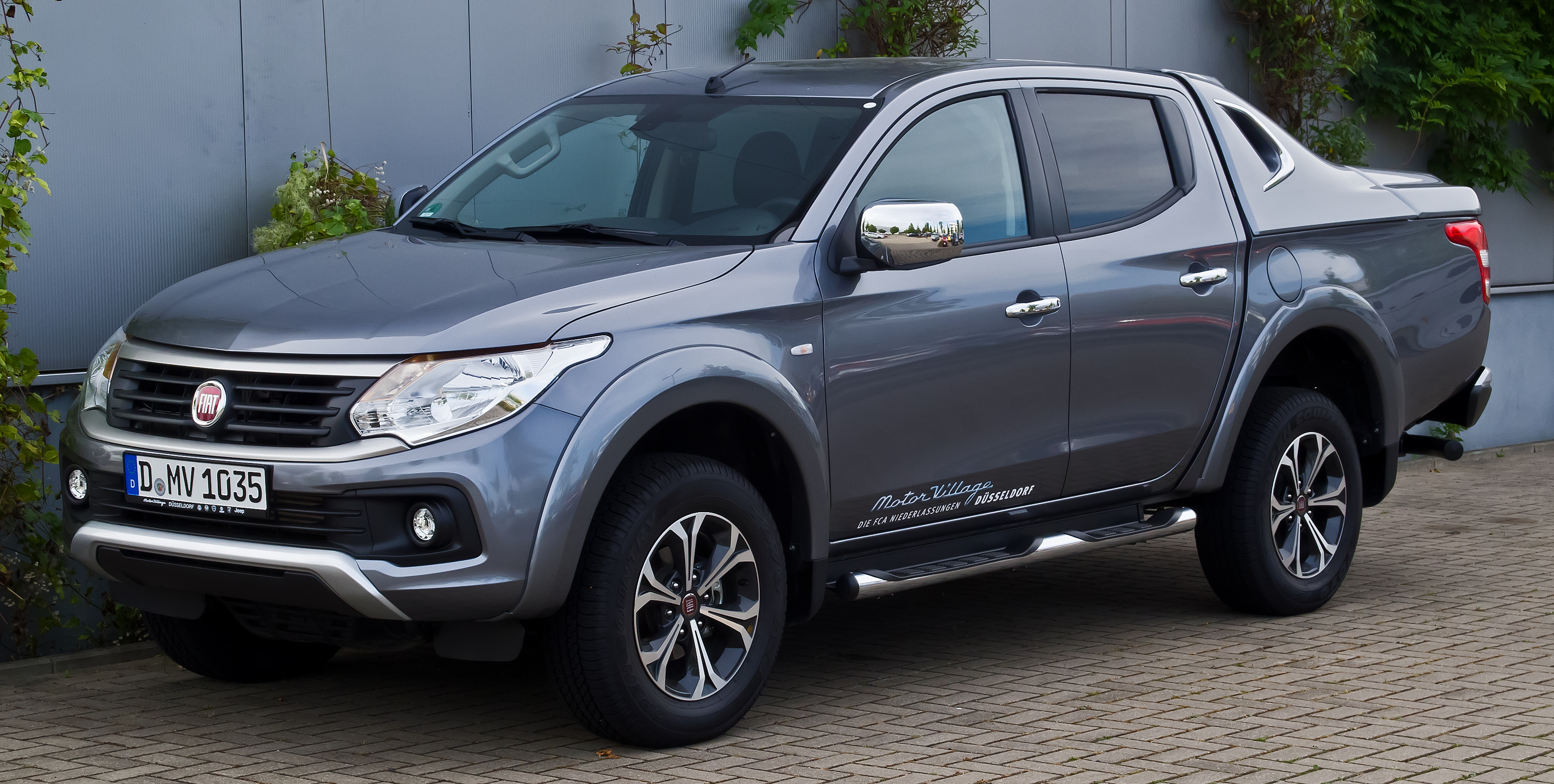
Fiat Fullback

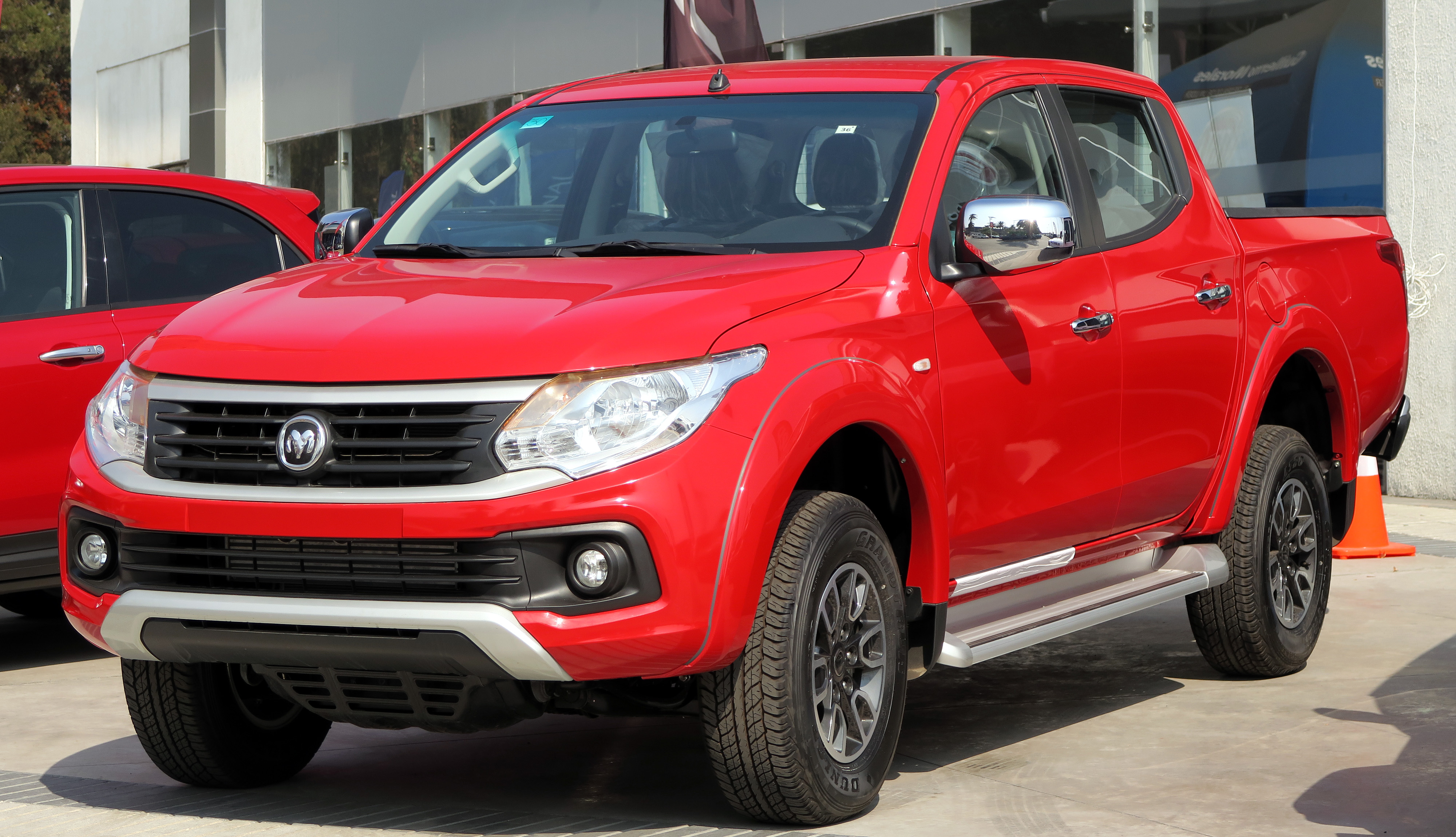
Ram 1200

=== Safety ===
==== Euro NCAP ====
The L200 in its standard European market configuration received 4 stars from Euro NCAP in 2015.

==== Latin NCAP ====
The L200 in its most basic Latin American market configuration with no airbags and no ESC received 0 stars for adult occupants and 2 stars for toddlers from Latin NCAP 2.0 in 2019.

Latin NCAP 2.0 test results Mitsubishi L200 - No Airbags (2019, based on Euro NCAP 2008)
Test	Points	Stars
Adult occupant:	0.00/34.0	0 /5 stars
Child occupant:	20.49/49.00	2 /5 stars

==== ANCAP ====
ANCAP test results* Mitsubishi Triton (2015)
Test	Score
Overall	5 /5 stars
Frontal offset	15.22/16
Side impact	16/16
Pole	2/2
Seat belt reminders	3/3
Whiplash protection	Good
Pedestrian protection	Adequate
Electronic stability control	Standard

==== ASEAN NCAP ====
ASEAN NCAP test results Mitsubishi Triton (2015)
Test	Points	Stars
Adult occupant:	13.56	4 /5 stars
Child occupant:	48%	2 /5 stars
Safety assist:	NA	

ASEAN NCAP test results Mitsubishi Triton (HV) (2015)
Test	Points	Stars
Adult occupant:	15.22	5 /5 stars
Child occupant:	48%	2 /5 stars
Safety assist:	NA	

=== Markets ===
==== Malaysia ====
The fifth generation Triton was launched in Malaysia in May 2015 being fully imported from Thailand. It was available in five variants: Triton Quest (MT), Triton MT, Triton VGT MT, Triton VGT AT and Triton VGT Adventure (AT). The VGT models came with a 2.5L variable geometry turbo engine capable of producing 178 PS (131 kW; 176 hp) and 400 N⋅m (295 lb⋅ft; 41 kg⋅m). The Triton MT had a 2.5L common rail turbo engine capable of producing 136 PS (100 kW; 134 hp) and 324 N⋅m (239 lb⋅ft; 33 kg⋅m) and the Triton Quest had a 2.5L DOHC common rail engine with 110 PS (81 kW; 108 hp) and 200 N⋅m (148 lb⋅ft; 20 kg⋅m). Two limited editions were made available including the: Triton Phantom Edition in January 2016 and the Triton Knight Edition in May 2016. Both were limited to 200 units each.

In September 2016, alongside of the change of engine for the VGT models to a 2.4L MIVEC VGT turbodiesel engine capable of 181 PS (133 kW; 179 hp) and 430 N⋅m (317 lb⋅ft; 44 kg⋅m), the Triton VGT Adventure X was also launched as the new range topper.

In April 2017, the Triton was updated. Changes included additional safety features for the VGT models, change in the steering wheel design and different colour choices.

In September 2017, the Triton VGT AT GL was launched and was positioned in between the Triton MT and Triton VGT MT.

In November 2017, the Triton VGT AT Premium was added to the lineup.

In January 2018, the Triton Athlete was launched as the new range topper.

In January 2019, the facelifted fifth generation Triton was launched in Malaysia with five variants: VGT (MT and AT), VGT Premium (MT and AT), Adventure X (AT only). The 4x2 Quest model remained unchanged.

==== Philippines ====
The fifth generation Triton, known locally as the Strada was launched on 20 March 2015 and was offered in six trim levels; GL 4x2, GL 4x4, GLX 4x2, GLX V, GLS V and GLS Sport V. All trims were initially offered with the 2.5-litre 4D56 engine. In August 2016, the 2.4-litre MIVEC VGT engine was added alongside the GT trim.

The facelifted Strada was launched in January 2019. It is offered in four variants; GLX Plus, GLS 2WD, GLS 4WD and GT 4WD.

Facelifted C&C and GL models of Strada was launched in February 2020.

=== Facelift ===
The Triton was refreshed for the 2019 model year at the 2018 Thailand International Motor Expo in Bangkok, Thailand. This update consists of new front fascia, which is inspired from the Pajero/Montero Sport, Eclipse Cross and Xpander, new teardrop taillight design treatment as the Pajero/Montero Sport, and slight changes in the interior for some variants. This model also received a rear air circulator located at the interior roof.

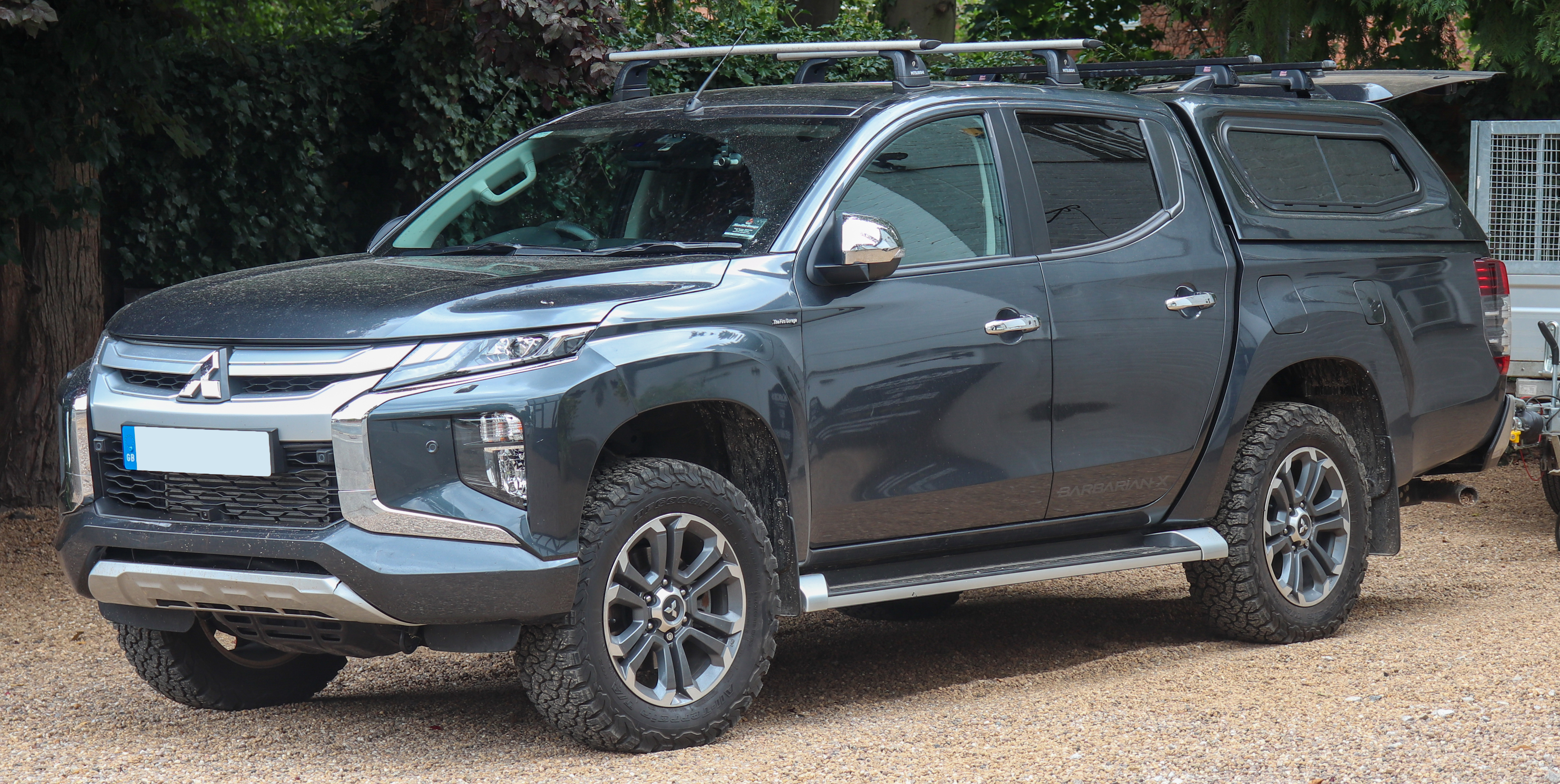
2019 Mitsubishi L200 Barbarian (facelift; UK)

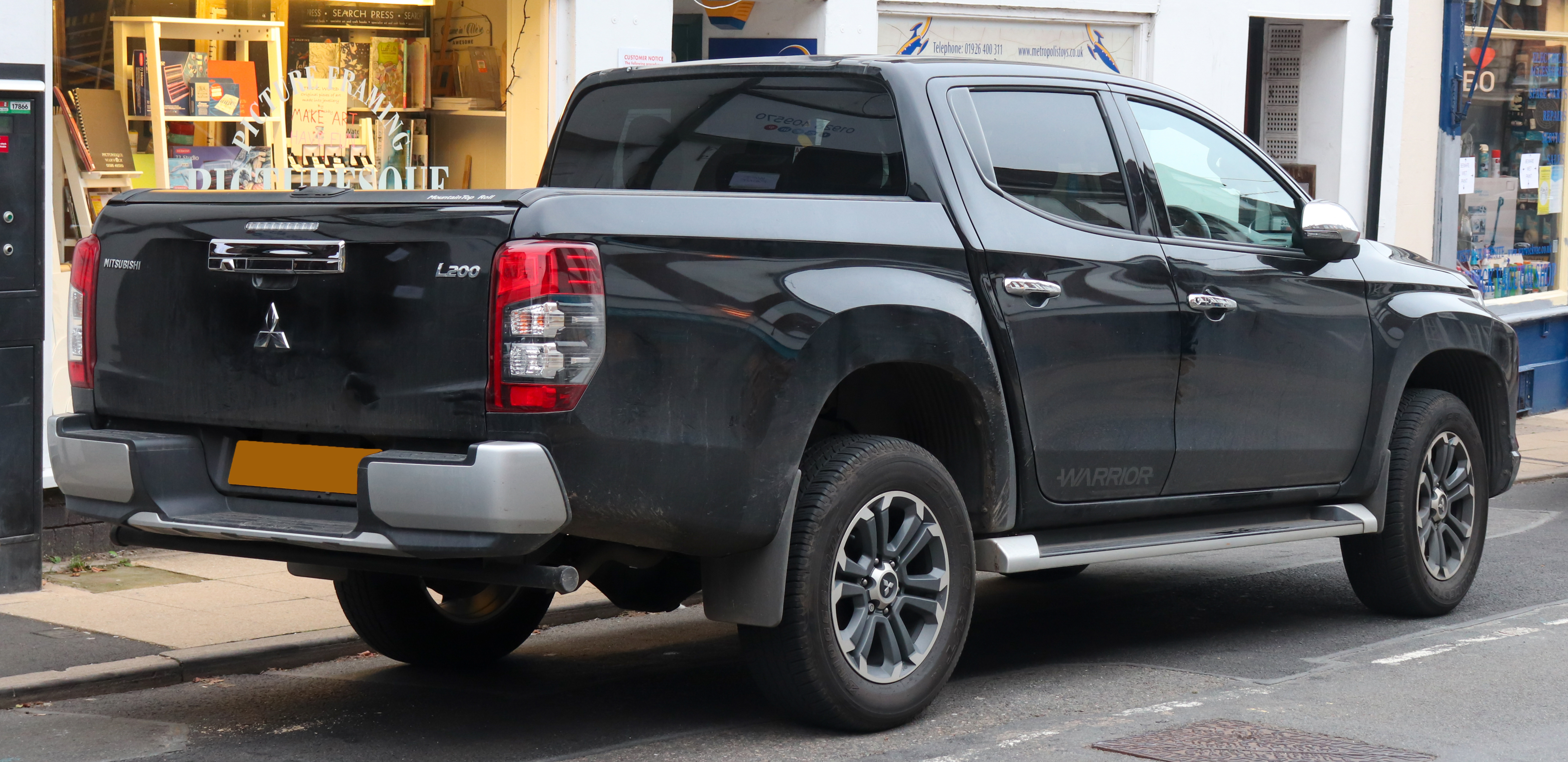
2019 Mitsubishi L200 Warrior (facelift; UK)

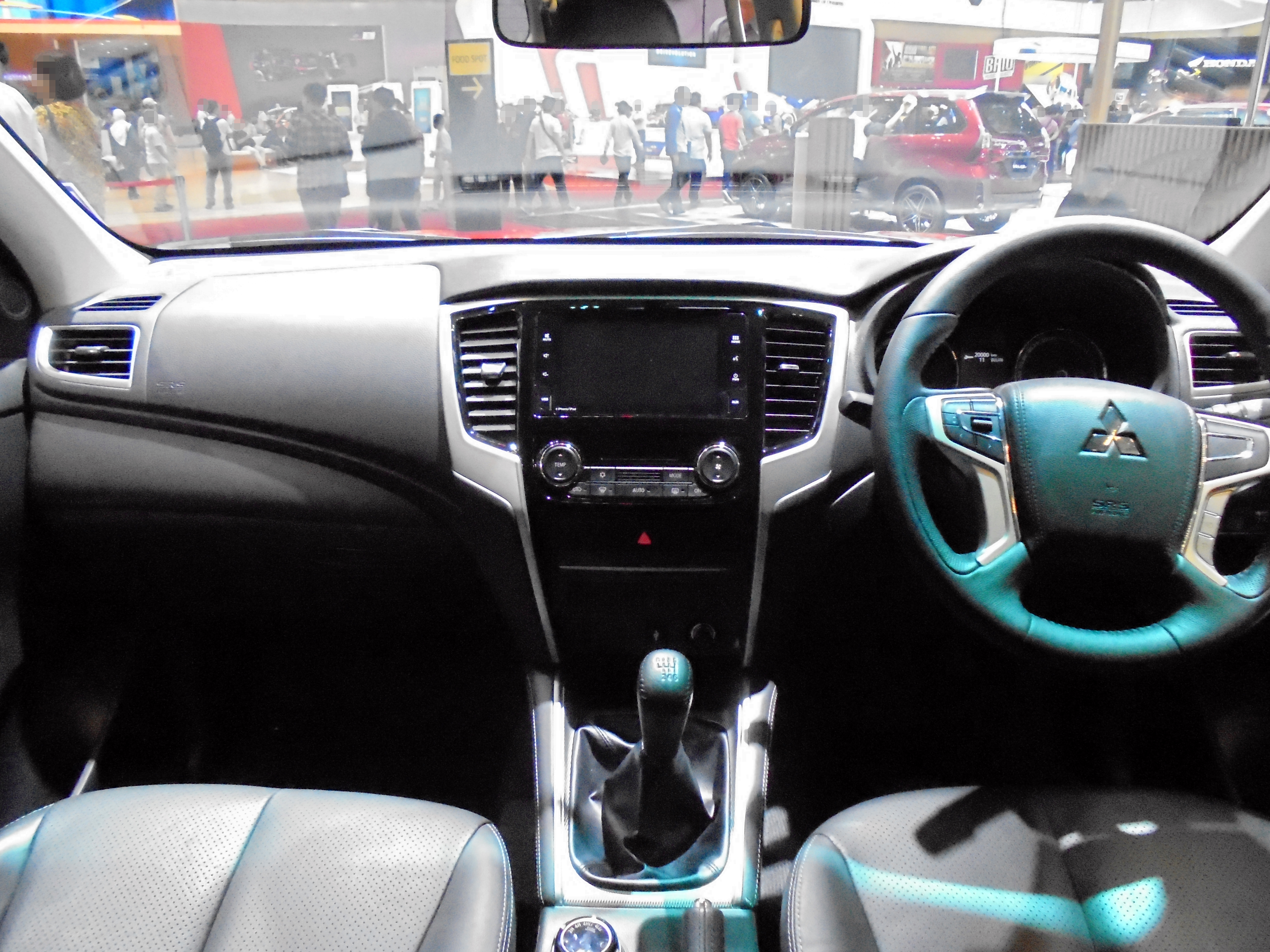
Interior

== Sixth generation (LC/MV; 2023) ==
Sixth generation
- 2024 Mitsubishi Triton Double Cab GSR (Japan)

Overview
- Model code: LC; MV (Australia)
- Also called: Mitsubishi L200; Nissan Navara (D27) (2026–present)
- Production: 2023–present
- Assembly: Thailand: Laem Chabang (MMTh); Brazil: Catalão (HPE)
- Designer: Norihiko Yoshimine

Body and chassis
- Body style: 2-door pickup 4-door pickup
- Related: Mitsubishi Pajero (fifth generation)

Powertrain
- Engine: Petrol: 2.4 L 4G64 I4; Diesel: 2.4 L 4N16 turbo I4; 2.4 L 4N16 twin-turbo I4
- Transmission: 6-speed manual; 6-speed automatic

Dimensions
- Wheelbase: 2,870 mm (113.0 in) (SWB); 3,130 mm (123.2 in)
- Length: 5,005–5,265 mm (197.0–207.3 in) (single cab); 5,320–5,360 mm (209.4–211.0 in) (double cab)
- Width: 1,795 mm (70.7 in) (single cab); 1,865–1,930 mm (73.4–76.0 in) (double cab)
- Height: 1,765–1,815 mm (69.5–71.5 in)

The sixth-generation Triton was unveiled on 26 July 2023, it features the ‘Beast Mode’ design concept previewed as the XRT Concept at the 2023 Bangkok International Motor Show, the interior follows the ‘Horizontal Axis’ concept with the use of geometric shapes and all contact items designed based on Mitsubishi Touch approach, and it features a new 4N16 turbocharged diesel engine with three power output options replaced the 4N15 unit. The three levels produce 110 kW (150 PS; 148 hp) in the base version, 135 kW (184 PS; 181 hp) in the "Hyper Power" variant, and 150 kW (204 PS; 201 hp) in the twin-turbocharged "Hyper Power X2".

The Triton will form the basis of a Honda-badged pickup truck to be sold in the Southeast Asian markets in 2028.

Rear view

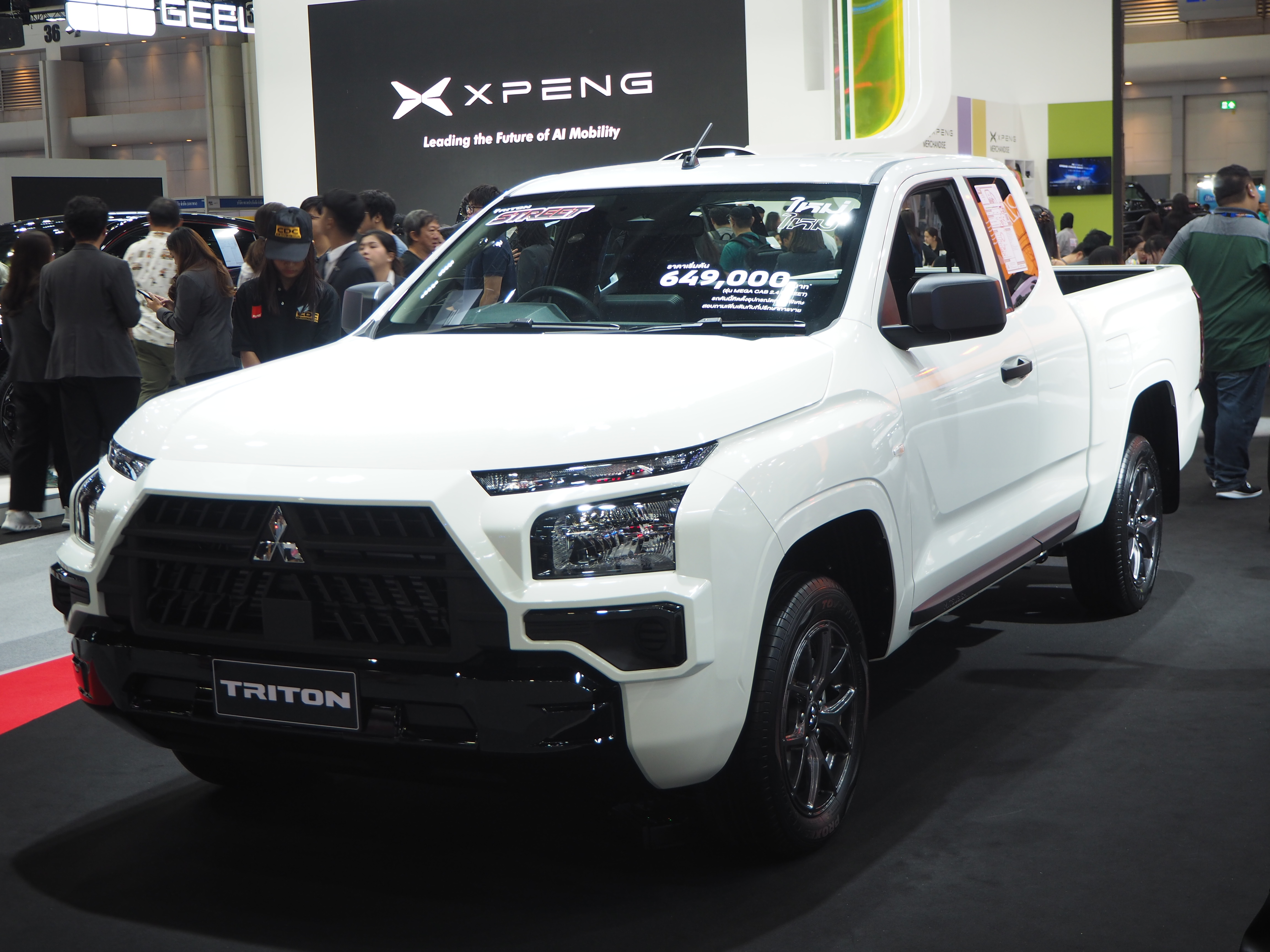
Triton Street

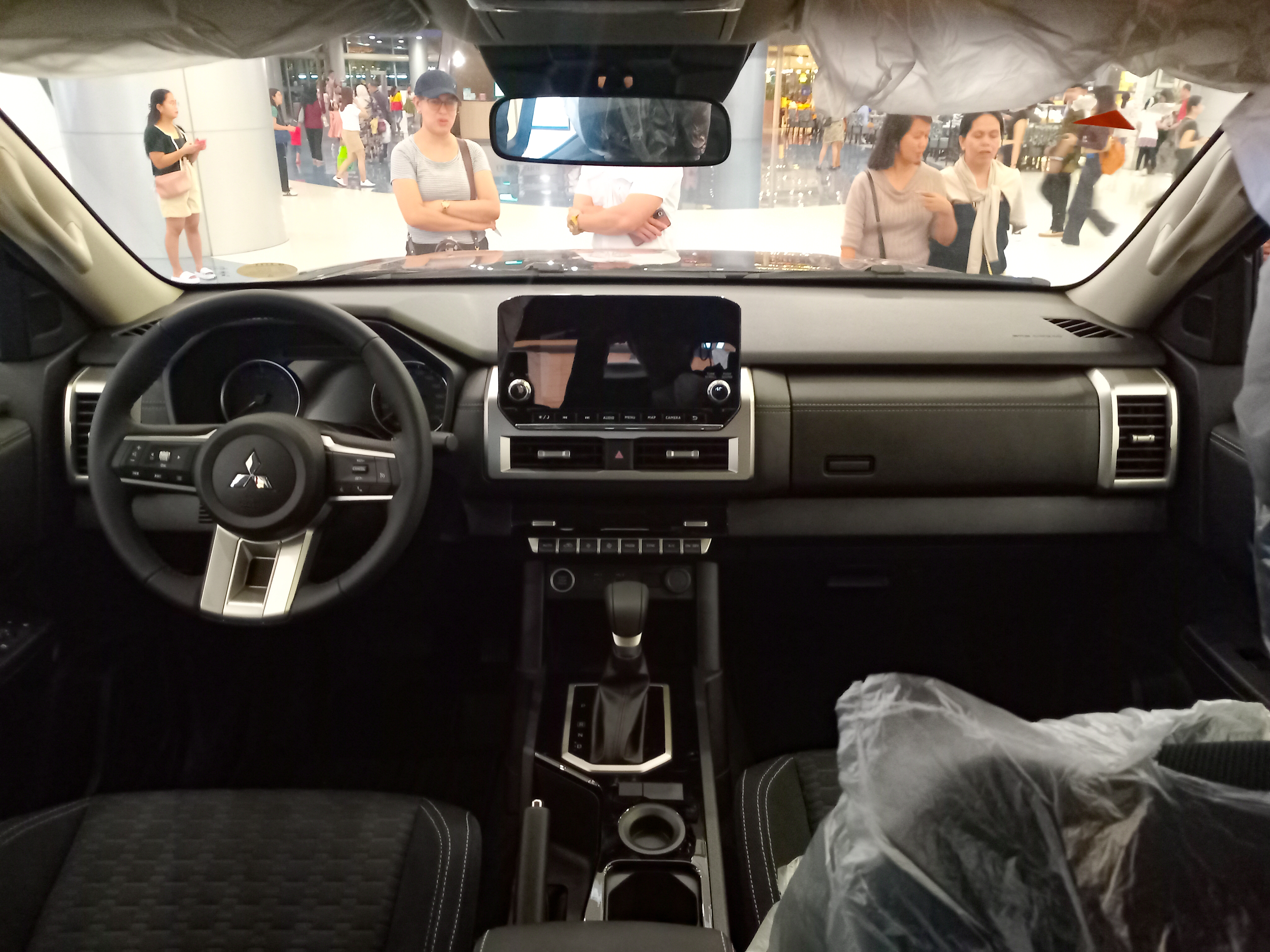
Interior

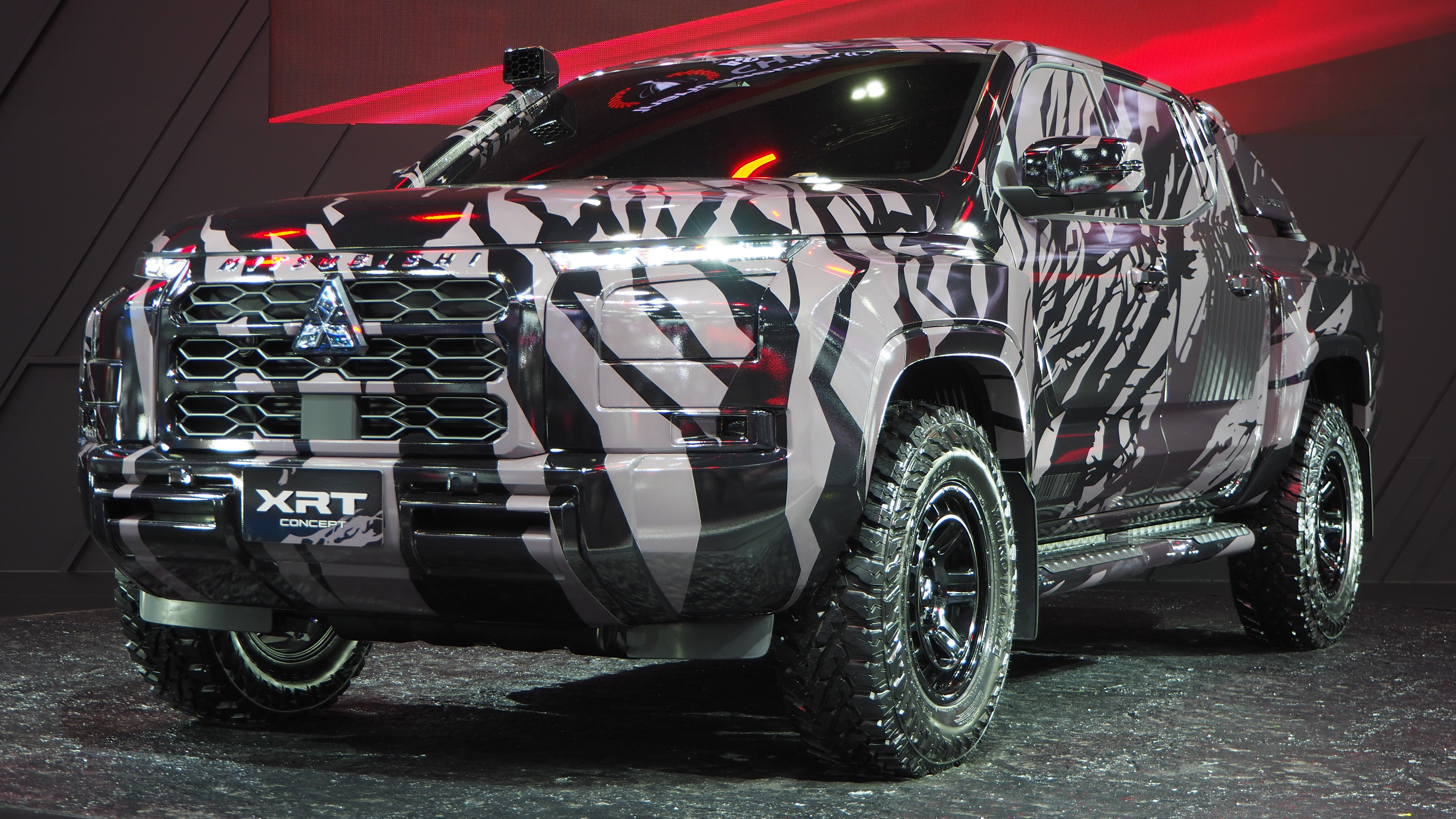
2023 Mitsubishi XRT Concept, which previewed the sixth-generation Triton

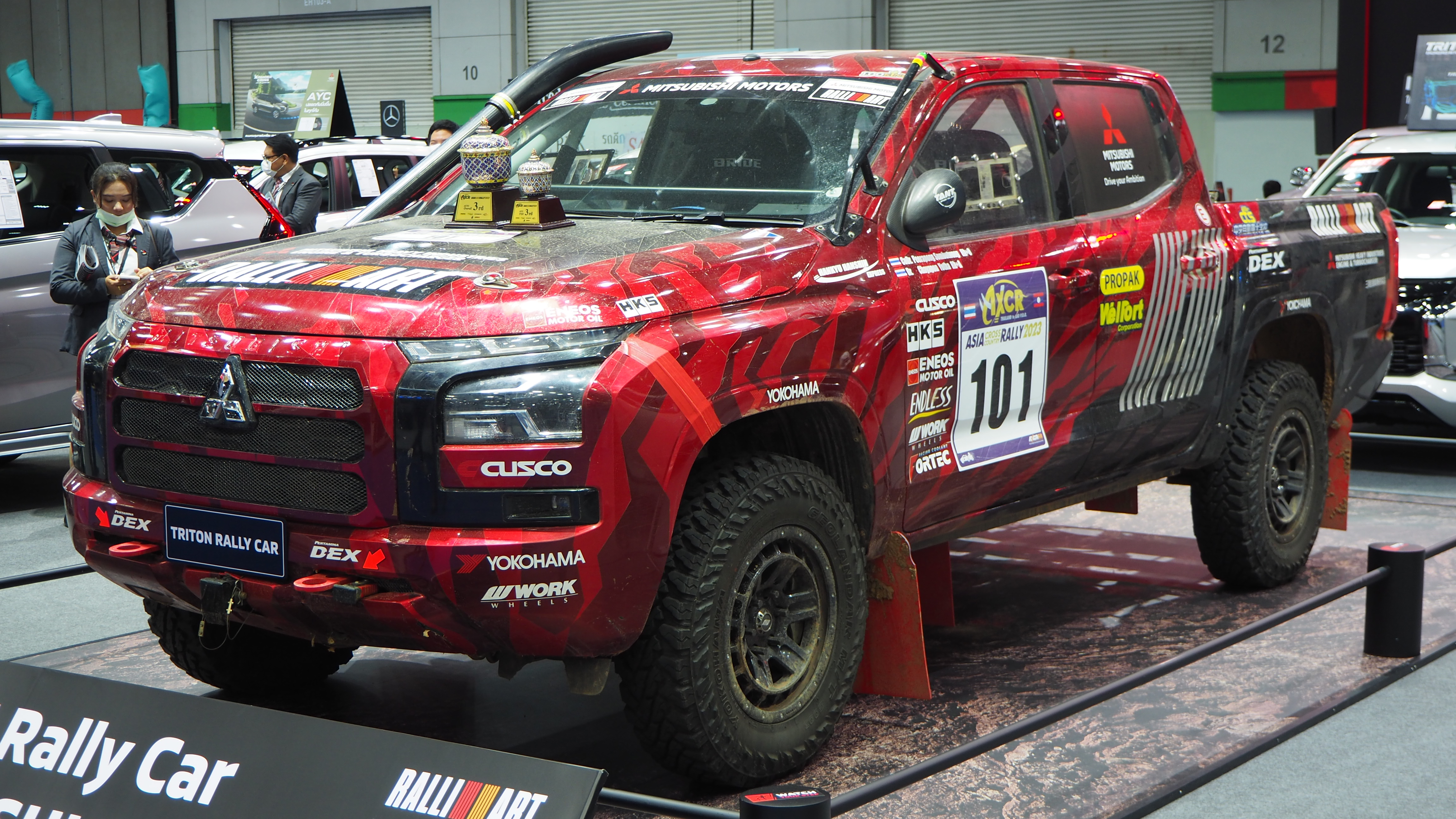
2023 Mitsubishi Triton AXCR

=== Markets ===
==== Africa ====
===== South Africa =====
The Triton was launched in South Africa on 19 November 2024, with five trim levels: GL, GLS, Xtreme, Athlete and Edition. In South Africa, the Triton is available in single cab and double cab configurations. In June 2026, the Bi-Turbo model was introduced in South Africa as the flagship variant.

==== Asia ====
===== Japan =====
In September 2022, Mitsubishi Motors announced that they would once again be selling the Triton line in the Japanese domestic market beginning in 2023, after 12 years of absence. The Triton was released in the Japanese market on 15 February 2024, only as a double cab configuration, with two trim levels: GLS and GSR. The model is imported from Thailand.

===== Cambodia =====
The sixth-generation Triton was launched in Cambodia in 2024, offered in two trims: GLS and GLS Extra Plus, both powered by a 2.4‑litre four‑cylinder turbo‑diesel engine paired with a six‑speed automatic transmission. Output varies by tune, with up to 201 PS and 470 Nm available on the higher‑spec variant. Four‑wheel drive is standard on both trims. Standard equipment includes LED headlamps and tail lamps, a 9‑inch touchscreen with wireless Apple CarPlay and Android Auto, and multiple drive modes for on‑ and off‑road conditions.

===== Indonesia =====
The Triton was launched in Indonesia on 17 July 2024 at the 31st Gaikindo Indonesia International Auto Show with five trim levels: GLX, HDX, GLS, Exceed and Ultimate. In Indonesia, it is available in single cab and double cab configurations.

===== Malaysia =====
The Triton was launched in Malaysia on 16 October 2024 with five variants: Single Cab M/T, M/T GL, A/T GL, A/T Premium and Athlete. In Malaysia, it is available in single cab and double cab configurations. In August 2026, the Single Cab model became available with the 6-speed automatic option.

===== Middle East =====
The L200 was launched in the GCC markets on 28 May 2024. It is available with double cab only and trim levels offered are GL, GLX and Sportero.

===== Philippines =====
The Triton was launched in the Philippines on 26 January 2024, only as a double cab configuration, with six variants: GL 2WD, GL 4WD, GLX 2WD, GLX 4WD, GLS 2WD and Athlete 4WD.

In January 2026, the GX 2WD grade was added to the lineup.

===== Thailand =====
In Thailand, the model is offered in three body configurations which are double cab, a single cab, and a mega cab with cargo space behind the front seats. At launch, it is offered in a total of fourteen variants with four trim levels: Active, Pro, Prime and Ultra. The Black Edition model was added in July 2024.

In June 2025, the Triton line-up was updated for the 2025 model year. The updates includes new black exterior decorations, the nanoe X air purification system was added for the flagship Ultra variant, and the discontinuation of the manual Pro and Ultra variants for the Double cab model. The Pro variant for the Mega Cab model was also discontinued.

In November 2025, the Mega Cab Street variant was introduced to replace the Mega Cab Active variant.

===== Vietnam =====
The Triton was launched in Vietnam on 11 September 2024 with three variants: GLX 2WD, Premium 2WD and Athlete 4WD. In Vietnam, it is only available in a double cab configuration. In September 2026, the Premium 4WD variant was introduced to the line-up below the Athlete variant.

==== Europe ====
In those European markets where it is available, it is sold as the Mitsubishi L200. The engine options are the three different 2.4-litre diesel variants, producing 110–150 kW (150–204 PS; 148–201 hp) and 330–470 N⋅m (243–347 lb⋅ft), typically paired to the six-speed automatic transmission. The lowest-powered engine is also available with a shift-by-wire, six-speed manual transmission. It is only offered with all-wheel drive, in either a part-time "Easy Select 4WD" system or with the more sophisticated "Super Select 4WD-II".

In the United Kingdom, only the double cab model was available, fitted with the most powerful diesel engine and the automatic transmission. Two trim levels were available, the Titan and the costlier Barbarian. UK company car tax benefits rules were changed in April 2025, and Double Cab pickup trucks became taxed at the higher rate typically incurred by passenger cars (with associated higher insurance costs). As a response, Mitsubishi UK introduced the L200 Commercial, a version of the L200 Double Cab with the rear seat removed and replaced by a permanent, additional cargo area including a steel bulkhead behind the front seats and cargo strap points.

==== Latin America ====
===== Argentina =====
The L200 was launched in Argentina on 8 April 2025, in the sole GLS (4x4) variant.

===== Brazil =====
The Triton was released in Brazil in December 2024, with six trim levels: GLMT, GLAT, GLS, HPE, HPE-S, and Katana.

===== Mexico =====
The L200 was launched in Mexico on 8 May 2024, with four variants: GLX (4x2), GLX (4x4), GLS (4x4) and GLS Limited (4x4).

==== Oceania ====
===== Australia =====
The Triton was released in Australia in February 2024, only as a double cab configuration, with four trim levels: GLX, GLX+, GLS and GSR. The GLX-R trim was added in July 2024 to sit between the GLX+ and GLS trim levels. In April 2025, single cab, mega cab marketed as the Club Cab, and cab-chassis configurations became available in Australia along with the availability of the manual transmission option. In April 2026, the Triton line-up was updated for the 2026 model year with an upgraded front and rear suspension, and also the manual option for discontinued for the GLX (2WD) variant.

The Raider trim was released in June 2026, as an off-roading focused trim. It is based on the GSR trim, with modifications done by Australian engineering firm Premcar.

===== New Zealand =====
The Triton was launched in New Zealand on 4 March 2024, with three trim levels: GLX, GLX-R and VRX. In New Zealand, the Triton is available in single cab, club cab and double cab configurations.

=== Safety ===
ASEAN NCAP test results Mitsubishi Triton (2023)
Test	Points
Overall:	5 /5 stars
Adult occupant:	32.52
Child occupant:	17.54
Safety assist:	14.44
Motorcyclist Safety:	10.22

ANCAP test results Mitsubishi Triton (2024, aligned with Euro NCAP)
Test	Points	%
Overall:	5 /5 stars	
Adult occupant:	34.64	86%
Child occupant:	44.04	89%
Pedestrian:	46.51	73%
Safety assist:	12.75	70%

Latin NCAP 3.5 test results Mitsubishi L200 / Triton Double cabin + 7 Airbags (2024, similar to Euro NCAP 2017)
Test	Points	%
Overall:	5 /5 stars	
Adult occupant:	35.96	90%
Child occupant:	44.67	91%
Pedestrian:	41.53	87%
Safety assist:	39.60	92%

Latin NCAP 3.5 test results Mitsubishi L200 / Triton Single Cabin + 7 Airbags (2024, similar to Euro NCAP 2017)
Test	Points	%
Overall:	5 /5 stars	
Adult occupant:	36.11	90%
Child occupant:	19.00	86%
Pedestrian:	41.53	87%
Safety assist:	39.60	92%

== Sales ==
Year	Thailand	Australia	Brazil	Mexico	Philippines	Malaysia (Note: Figures based on registration (Malaysia))	Indonesia
2000						31	—
2001						3,263	—
2002			9,042			4,675	547
2003			9,488			3,612	1,155
2004			12,596			2,942	2,090
2005			12,584			827	5,291
2006			11,543			2,138	6,855
2007			11,037			3,481	6,149
2008			19,040	1,672		5,072	8,604
2009			20,091	2,007		4,955	4,803
2010			20,645	1,891		7,864	6,169
2011			22,142	2,234		8,302	8,144
2012			21,530	2,652		7,962	7,610
2013			21,378	2,807		7,061	8,547
2014	33,105		20,572	3,559		6,001	7,201
2015	25,261		14,416	4,439		5,683	7,619
2016	23,584		9,944	5,580		5,482	6,444
2017	32,450		9,948	6,260		4,553	9,853
2018	39,984	24,896	10,769	5,838	4,725	5,656	11,794
2019	35,789	25,819	10,226	6,638	8,167	5,794	8,251
2020	25,704	18,136	9,491	5,128	4,958	6,914	5,826
2021	21,301	19,232	13,163	8,812	5,272	9,270	9,443
2022	21,573	27,436	15,822	9,508	8,148	9,697	9,493
2023	12,973	16,641	12,663	10,323		9,810	8,690
2024	6,898	18,077	10,983	11,886		7,112	8,296
2025		18,900	15,281			4,731	10,191
