= Stellantis Pro One =

Division of automotive company

Stellantis Pro One is a division of Stellantis created in October 2023 that incorporates six European and US commercial vehicle marques of Citroen, Fiat Professional, Peugeot, Vauxhall/Opel and Ram Trucks.

In January 2026, Eric Laforge was appointed Head of Pro One, replacing Anne Abboud who was leaving the company. Abboud was head of sales with the launch of Pro One, and was promoted to Head of Pro One at the beginning of 2025.

== Current vehicles ==
European designed:

- Citroën Berlingo including the derivatives Fiat Doblò, Peugeot Partner, Opel/Vauxhall Combo
- Citroën Jumpy/Citroën Dispatch including the derivatives Fiat Scudo, Opel/Vauxhall Vivaro, Peugeot Expert, Ram ProMaster City
- Fiat Ducato including the derivatives Citroën Jumper, Citroën Relay, Opel/Vauxhall Movano, Peugeot Boxer, Peugeot Manager, Ram ProMaster

South America designed:

- Fiat Strada, Ram 700
- Peugeot Landtrek, Fiat Titano, Ram 1200, Ram Dakota

US designed:

- Ram 1500
- Ram Heavy Duty
