= Mitsubishi Motors (Thailand) =

Thai subsidiary of Mitsubishi Motors

- Native name: บริษัท มิตซูบิชิ มอเตอร์ส (ประเทศไทย)
- Formerly: MMC Sittipol Co., Ltd.
- Type: Subsidiary
- Founded: 1987; 39 years ago
- Headquarters: FYI Center, Thailand
- Key people: Inaba Ryoichi (President & CEO)
- Products: Automobile manufacturing
- Number of employees: c. 4,000 (2004)
- Parent: Mitsubishi Motors (100%)
- Subsidiaries: MMTh Engine Co., Ltd. (MEC)
- Website: www.mitsubishi-motors.co.th

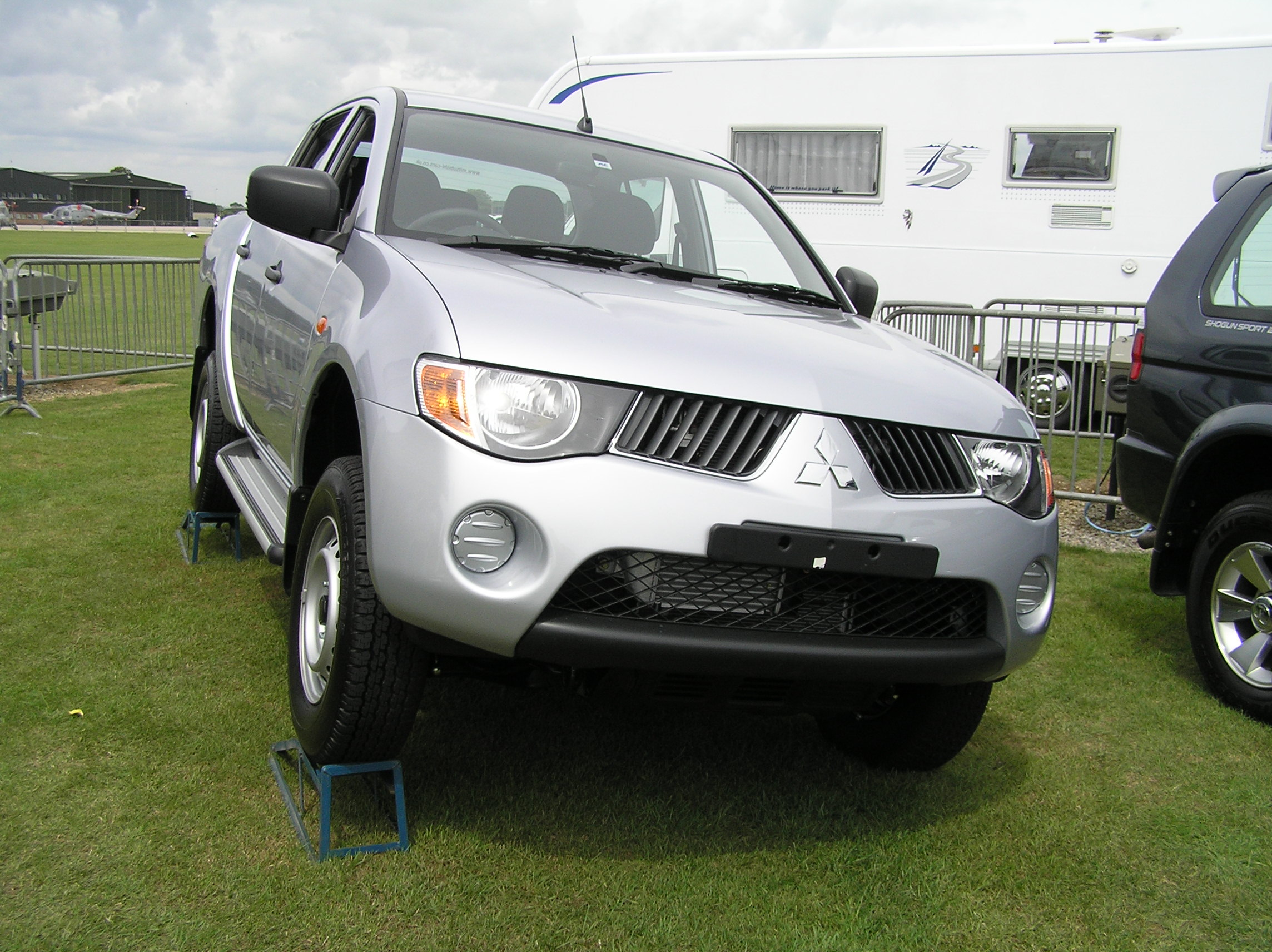
The Akinori Nakanishi-styled Mitsubishi Triton, Thailand's most successful automotive export.

Mitsubishi Motors (Thailand) is the Thai operation of Mitsubishi Motors Corporation. It became the first Thai automobile manufacturer to export vehicles overseas in 1988, and has remained the country's largest exporter every year since.

Mitsubishi Motors Thailand is currently the most productive of the parent corporation's four manufacturing facilities outside Japan, with 133,109 vehicles produced in 2006. It exported its one millionth pickup truck in October 2007. In anticipation of a growth in the market for pickup trucks, Mitsubishi is investing 21 billion baht (¥1 billion) to increase local capacity to 200,000 units. In November 2015, Mitsubishi Motors Thailand celebrated production of its four millionth vehicle.

Mitsubishi Motors Thailand owns a subsidiary, MMTh Engine, located at Laem Chabang Industrial Estates, Tambon Thung Sukhla, Si Racha District, Chonburi Province, which produces auto components.

== History ==
Mitsubishi has had a presence in Thailand since 1961. Mitsubishi began building trucks in Thailand in 1966, under a company called United Development Motor Industry Co (UDMI) (established 1964). In 1965, Mitsubishi Heavy Industries (MHI) became the majority shareholder (60%) of UDMI. The Galant sedan followed in 1972 and the L200 pickup truck in 1981. MMC acquired 40% of Sittipol Motor Co (SMC), the distributor of Mitsubishi vehicles in Thailand, in late 1973. In 1987, SMC and UDMI merged to become MMC Sittipol Co., Ltd. (MSC) with MMC holding 48%. In 1988, Mitsubishi Mirage was exported to supply Chrysler Canada. In 1992, local production at the No. 1 factory in Laem Chabang started. In 1996, local production at the Laem Chabang No. 2 Factory was started. In August 1997, MMC became the majority owner of MSC. In 2003, MSC changed its name to Mitsubishi Motors (Thailand) Co., Ltd. In January 2004, the Fuso truck business was split to form Mitsubishi Fuso Trucks (Thailand).

In 2001 Mitsubishi increased their stake from 46.2 to 99.9 percent, followed by a name change to "Mitsubishi Motors (Thailand) Co., Ltd." in November 2003.

== Current models ==
=== Manufactured locally ===
- Mitsubishi Triton (2005–present)
- Mitsubishi Pajero Sport (2008–present)
- Mitsubishi Attrage (2013–present)
- Mitsubishi Xpander (2018–present, local production since 2024)
- Mitsubishi Xforce (2025–present)
- Nissan Navara (D27) (2025–present, export only)
- Mitsubishi Pajero (2026–present)

== Former models ==
=== Manufactured locally ===
- Mitsubishi Space Wagon (2003–2011)
- Mitsubishi Lancer (2000–2014)
- Fiat Fullback/Ram 1200 (2016–2019, export only)
- Mitsubishi Strada G-Wagon (2001–2005)
- Nissan Navara (D40) (2012–2014)
- Dodge Attitude (2013–2024, export only)
- Mitsubishi Outlander PHEV (2020–2024)
- Mitsubishi Mirage (2012–2025)

=== Imported ===
- Mitsubishi Delica D:5/Delica Space Wagon (2015–2016; Japan)
- Mitsubishi Outlander (2003–2005; Japan)
- Mitsubishi Pajero (1991–2006; Japan)

== Production and sales ==
The company surpassed a cumulative five million production units by 2018.

Mitsubishi Motors Thailand exported 332,700 vehicles in 2019, a 3.9% drop. Mitsubishi posted local sales in 2019 of 88,244 units, up 4.4%, overcoming a Thai car market that fell 3.3% to 1,007,552 units sold in 2019.

Year	Production								Domestic sales
Year	L200 Strada	Triton	Lancer	Grandis	Pajero Sport	Mirage	Attrage	Total	Domestic sales
1994	figures unavailable							70,197	76,557
1995	figures unavailable							71,426	78,151
1996	figures unavailable							74,760	87,672
1997	figures unavailable							78,413	35,191
1998	figures unavailable							65,341	15,840
1999	figures unavailable							77,857	19,172
2000	84,813	-	5,401	-	-	-	-	90,214	28,266
2001	78,845	-	5,302	-	-	-	-	84,147	23,665
2002	97,589	-	12,076	-	-	-	-	109,665	32,010
2003	95,680	-	7,381	-	-	-	-	103,511	33,799
2004	120,572	-	6,310	3,306	-	-	-	130,188	39,564
2005	90,080	43,769	6,725	3,350	-	-	-	143,924	43,722
2006	26,901	121,687	3,165	1,089	-	-	-	152,842	26,003
2007	6,257	155,027	2,693	1,865	11	-	-	165,853	26,887
2008	-	135,443	2,084	2,084	15,065	-	-	156,647	19,231
2009	-	87,008	1,880	1,880	37,179	-	-	129,463	23,397
2010	-	135,895	1,741	1,774	55,289	-	-	199,760	47,513
2011	-	147,542	3,354	179	67,966	20	-	221,450	73,649
2012	-	185,670	2,320	-	82,712	122,633	-	393,910	141,923
2013	-	143,947	990	-	49,438	97,938	47,006	339,319	85,199
2014	-	159,457	90	-	42,207	100,240	29,850	331,844	58,896
2015	-	129,171	-	-	68,361	83,857	53,733	335,122	63,581
2016	-	144,842	-	-	59,993	86,189	65,329	356,353	55,717
2017	-	167,051	-	-	62,201	71,927	64,033	365,212	73,497
2018	-	194,314	-	-	51,411	77,577	60,879	384,181	87,855

(Sources: Facts & Figures 2000, Facts & Figures 2005, Facts & Figures 2008, Facts & Figures 2010, Facts & Figures 2013, Facts & Figures 2018, Facts & Figures 2019, Mitsubishi Motors website)
