= Samelet =

Israeli automobile dealership

- Formerly: Mediterranean Car Agency
- Type: Privately held company
- Industry: Automobile import and distribution
- Founded: 1946
- Founder: Avraham Goldstein-Goren
- Key people: Gili Priente (CEO)
- Products: Car imports
- Brands: Fiat, Subaru, Ferrari, Maserati, Alfa Romeo, Jeep, Chrysler, Dodge, Ram Trucks, Iveco
- Services: Automobile import, dealership network
- Owner: Levi Family
- Number of employees: 350
- Website: www.samelet.com

Samelet (abbreviation of the Hebrew for Mediterranean Car Agency) is a privately held Israeli dealership of imported automobiles. The company has been the sole importer of Fiat in Israel, and is the official representative of Subaru, Ferrari, and the FCA automobile corporation which includes Fiat and Chrysler. Samelet employs 350 workers country-wide. Shai Feldman served as the company's CEO from 2019 to 2025, and as of 2026, the position is held by Gili Priente. It represents 20% of the car brands in Israel, and operates a network of branches throughout the country.

== History ==
=== 20th century ===
Samelet was founded in 1946, by businessman Avraham Goldstein-Goren, after being awarded exclusivity to import the vehicles of the Italian Fiat Group to the territories of Mandatory Palestine and the Middle East. After the establishment of the State of Israel, the company continued to hold concessions in Israel, although in the first years, imports were restricted due to a shortage of foreign currency. In 1960, all restrictions on vehicle imports were lifted and the company grew rapidly. In 1964, construction of a showroom and garage in central Tel Aviv began; it was inaugurated in 1965. In 1971, the company opened a showroom and garage in central Jerusalem. In 1989, the company was acquired by the industrialist Michael Levy.

In 1991, Samelet became the official representative of the Alfa Romeo brand in Israel.

=== 21st century ===
In 2012, Samelet acquired Auto-Italia Romania and the activity of the Iveco truck and bus brand. In 2013, Samelet acquired Japanauto, the importer of Subaru in Israel, becoming the official representative of Subaru in Israel. In 2014, Samelet acquired partial ownership of the luxury brands Ferrari and Maserati: It first purchased 25% of the shares of Auto-Italia, an importer of Ferrari and Maserati to Israel, from Kardan Car of the Kardan Israel Group, for 5 million NIS. Later, Universal Motors Israel acquired "Kardan Car", and in August 2019, transferred full ownership of Auto-Italia (75%) to Samelet. In 2016, Samelet acquired the activity of the Jeep, Chrysler, Ram, and Dodge brands in Israel from the "traffic device" company, this was following the merger of the Fiat Group with the global Chrysler company and the establishment of the FCA Automotive Group.

In October 2019, the FCA and the PSA Group (represented in Israel by the Lubinski Group) announced a merger. The merger was completed in January 2021 and the joint company – Stalantis – was established, combining the activities of the FCA and PSA brands.

- FCA Brands – Abarth, Alfa Romeo, Fiat, Ram Trucks, Maserati, Chrysler, Jeep, Lancia, Dodge
- Ferrari – The luxury car brand is owned by a public company issued on the New York Stock Exchange in 2015. The import franchise was received in 2009 by the entrepreneur Zohar Alon, but he sold it after two years, and since 2019 it is owned by Samelet.
- Iveco – Italian manufacturer of trucks, commercial vehicles, buses, minibuses and service taxis. The company was established in 1975 from a union of several European manufacturers and was controlled by the Fiat Group. As of 2012, the company is represented by Samelet.
- Subaru

As of 2023, after adding several Chinese brands, the company represents 15 car brands in Israel, of which 12 are actually marketed, and 7 are owned by the FCA corporation.
