= Ram Trucks =

American brand of light to mid-weight commercial vehicles, a division of Stellantis

- Type: Division
- Industry: Automobile
- Predecessor: Historical: Graham Brothers Trucks, Fargo Trucks, Plymouth Trucks, and Dodge Truck division
- Founded: 2009; 17 years ago
- Headquarters: Auburn Hills, Michigan, U.S. Administration, Research, Engineering & Design
- Area served: North America, Middle East, Latin America, Europe, Southeast Asia, Oceania
- Key people: Matt VanDyke (Ram Brand CEO)
- Products: Trucks and vans
- Parent: Stellantis North America
- Website: ramtrucks.com

Ram Trucks (stylized as RAM) is an American brand of light to mid-weight pickup heavy duty trucks and other commercial vehicles, and a division of Stellantis North America (previously Chrysler Group LLC). It was established in a spin-off of Dodge in 2009 using the name of the Ram pickup line of trucks. Ram Trucks' logo, featuring the head of a ram, was originally used by Dodge. New series Ram 1500 pickups are made at Sterling Heights Assembly in Sterling Heights, Michigan. Since its inception, the brand has used the slogan "Guts. Glory. Ram."

In October 2023, Ram became part of the Stellantis Pro One global commercial vehicles division.

== Background ==
Prior to the 1970s, Dodge had maintained a separate marque for trucks, Fargo Trucks, primarily for use outside the United States. After that point, all trucks made by Chrysler were distributed under the Dodge marque.

In June 2009, when Chrysler emerged from Chapter 11 bankruptcy protection, Fiat Group received a 20% stake in Chrysler Group LLC and Sergio Marchionne was appointed CEO, replacing CEO Robert Nardelli. On June 10 that year, substantially all of Chrysler's assets were sold to "New Chrysler", organized as Chrysler Group LLC. The federal government provided support for the deal with US$8 billion in financing at near 21%. Under CEO Marchionne, "World Class Manufacturing" or WCM, a system of thorough manufacturing quality, was introduced and several products re-launched with quality and luxury. The Ram, Jeep, Dodge, SRT and Chrysler divisions were separated to focus on their own identity and brands.

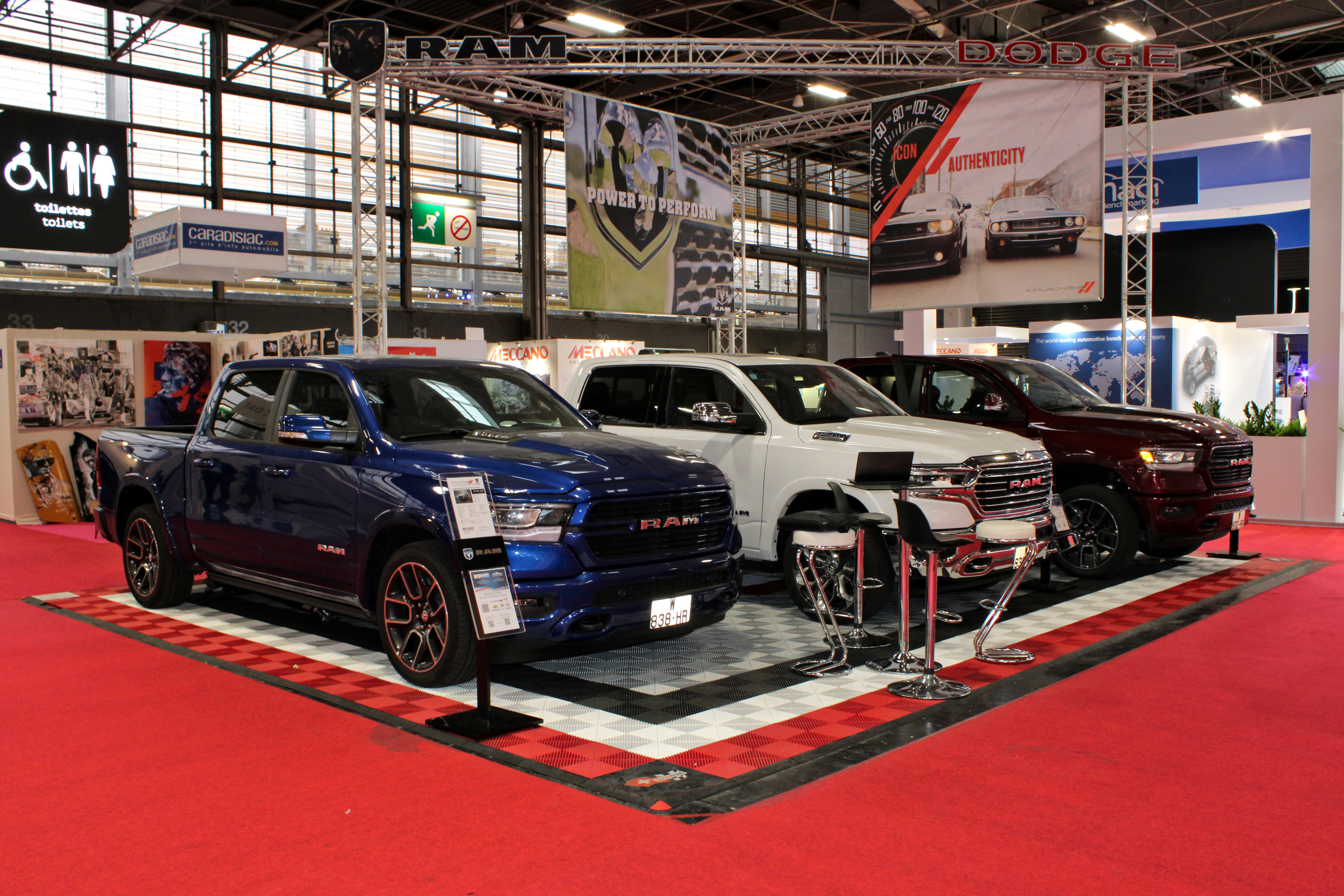
Ram Trucks at Paris Motor Show 2018

Ram Trucks was established as a division of Chrysler in 2009 as a spin-off from Dodge using the name of the Dodge Ram line of pickups that is now sold under the Ram banner. According to Chrysler, the Ram Trucks brand will concentrate on "real truck customers", rather than casual truck buyers who buy trucks for image or style.

The Fiat Ducato cargo van design has been adopted and is sold as the Ram ProMaster in North American markets, filling the gap created when Daimler ended production of the Dodge Sprinter in 2008. The goal was to increase truck sales "from today's 280,000 to 415,000 by 2014".

Executives at Chrysler stated their intention to compete in the semi-trailer truck category with Ram, a possibility that was aided by Fiat's ownership of Iveco and an already available network of Dodge dealers. Ram trucks are marketed separately from Dodge cars; former Ram Division President Fred Diaz stated, "Ram trucks are not a Dodge model. Ram will always be 'vinned' (Vehicle Identification Number) as a Ram. We need to continue to market as Ram so Dodge can have a different brand identity: hip, cool, young, energetic. That will not fit the campaign for truck buyers. The two should have distinct themes."

On July 21, 2011, Fiat bought the Chrysler shares held by the U.S. Treasury, increasing its stake in the company.

In April 2013, Diaz left Ram Trucks to serve as vice president of Nissan's divisional sales and marketing. He was replaced by Reid Bigland.

In August 2014, Ram Trucks CEO Reid Bigland was tapped to lead the Alfa Romeo brand in North America. It was announced that the new head of the Ram Trucks brand would be longtime Chrysler employee Robert Hegbloom, who joined Chrysler in 1986 and had been a director for Dodge. In October 2018, Bigland was promoted to CEO of Ram Trucks. Shortly thereafter, he discovered that the division had been misreporting sales figures and turned over that information to the U.S. government for investigation. Allegedly, Fiat Chrysler cut his bonuses in retaliation, which resulted in Bigland filing a whistleblower lawsuit against them. In March 2020, Bigland announced his resignation.

In December 2024, former CEO of Dodge and Ram, Tim Kuniskis came out of retirement to once again become CEO of Ram.

== Vehicles ==
For specifically foreign-market models (designed by Chrysler Europe, etc.), see below.

From 1927 to 1928, all trucks built by Dodge were sold under the Graham name, as that company held the marketing rights at that time.

=== Current ===
- Ram pickup (1981–present): The brand's flagship product line of pickup trucks.
  - Ram 1500 (DT) (2019–present): Full-sized pickup truck, the company's fifth-generation model.
  - Ram 1500 REV (2026, expected): Plug-in hybrid full-sized pickup truck.
  - Ram 1500 TRX (2021–2024; 2027–present): High-performance full-sized pickup truck.
  - Ram Heavy Duty (2019–present): Series of heavy-duty pickup truck models.
- Ram 700 (2014–present): The Fiat Strada, a coupé utility sold in Chile, Bolivia, Colombia, Brazil and Peru, is sold as the Ram 700 in Mexico and South America (formerly known as Ram V700 Express in Chile).
- Ram 1000 (2018–present): The Fiat Toro, a compact pickup manufactured in Brazil, is sold in Latin America as the Ram 1000.
- Ram 1200 (2025–present) : The Changan F70 / Peugeot Landtrek, a midsize pickup built by a Shenzhen Baoneng Motor joint venture, was sold as the Ram 1200 in Mexico.
- Ram ProMaster (2013–present): The brand's line of vans
  - Ram ProMaster Van (2013–present): Full-size vans for the North America market. The line includes models 1500, 2500, and 3500, with cut-away chassis-cab versions available. Rebadged Fiat Ducato.
  - Ram ProMaster City (2026–present): The Citroën Jumpy is sold as the Ram ProMaster City in North America.
  - Ram ProMaster Rapid (2014–present): The Latin America-spec Fiat Fiorino van is sold as the Ram ProMaster Rapid in Mexico.
  - Ram V700 Rapid (2014–present): The Latin America-spec Fiat Fiorino van is sold as the Ram V700 Rapid in Chile, Bolivia, Colombia, and Peru.
  - Ram V700 City (2018–present): The European-spec Fiat Fiorino van is sold as the Ram V700 City in Chile.
- Ram Rampage (2023–present): A unibody pickup truck produced by Stellantis in Brazil and marketed through the American Ram marque. It is the first Ram-branded vehicle to be produced in Brazil.
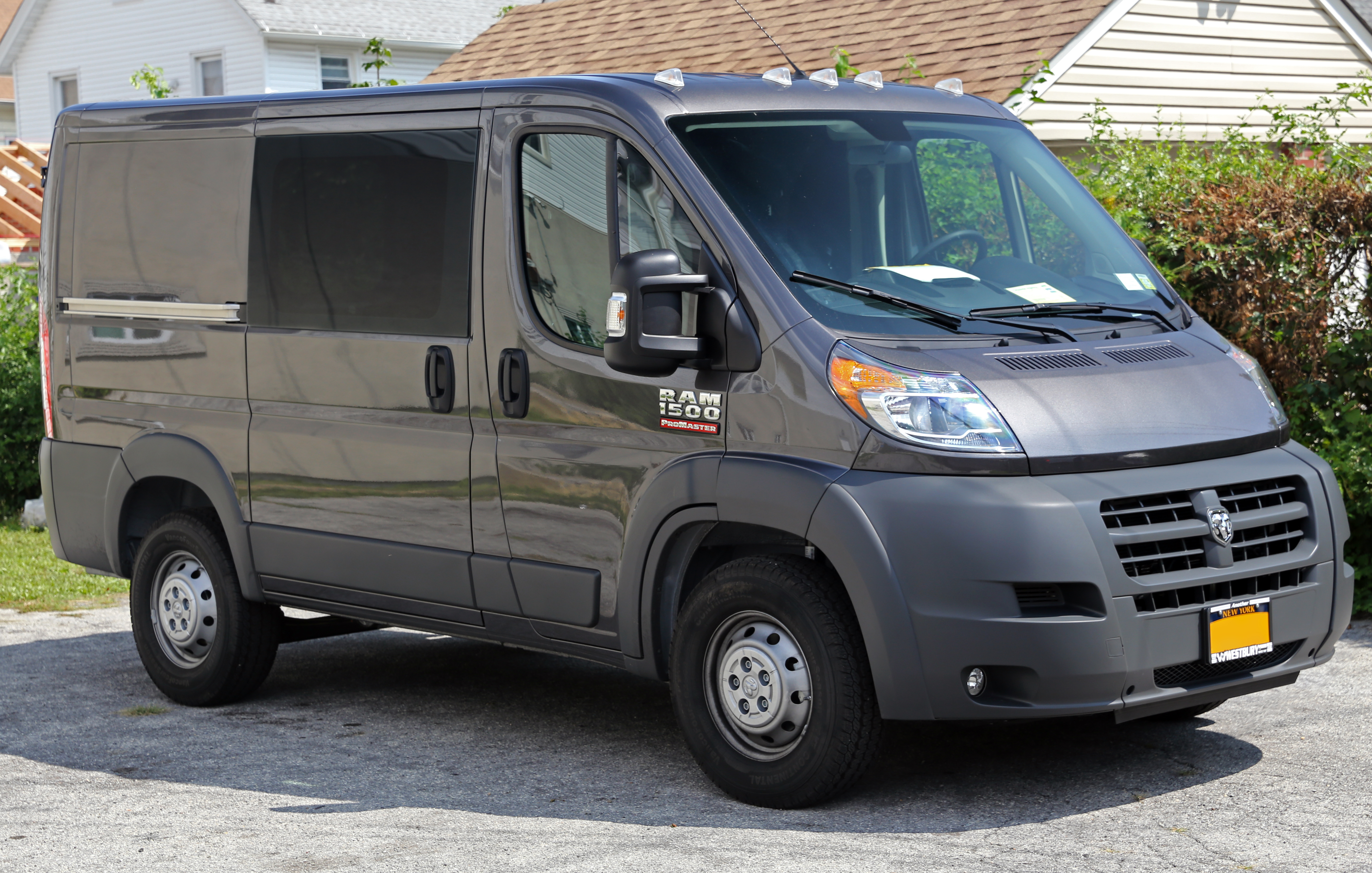
2014 Ram 1500 ProMaster Tradesman SWB

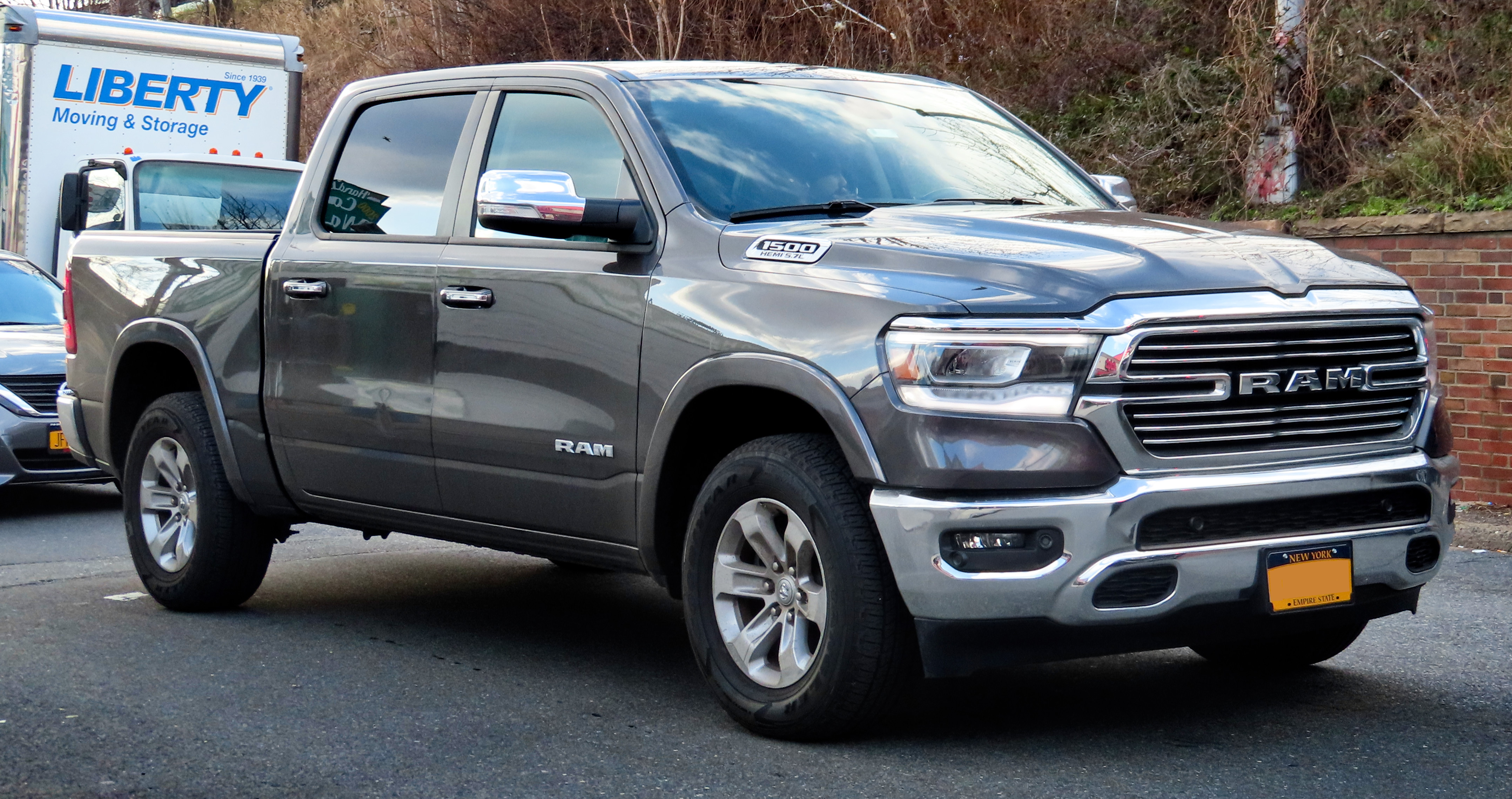
2019 Ram 1500 Laramie

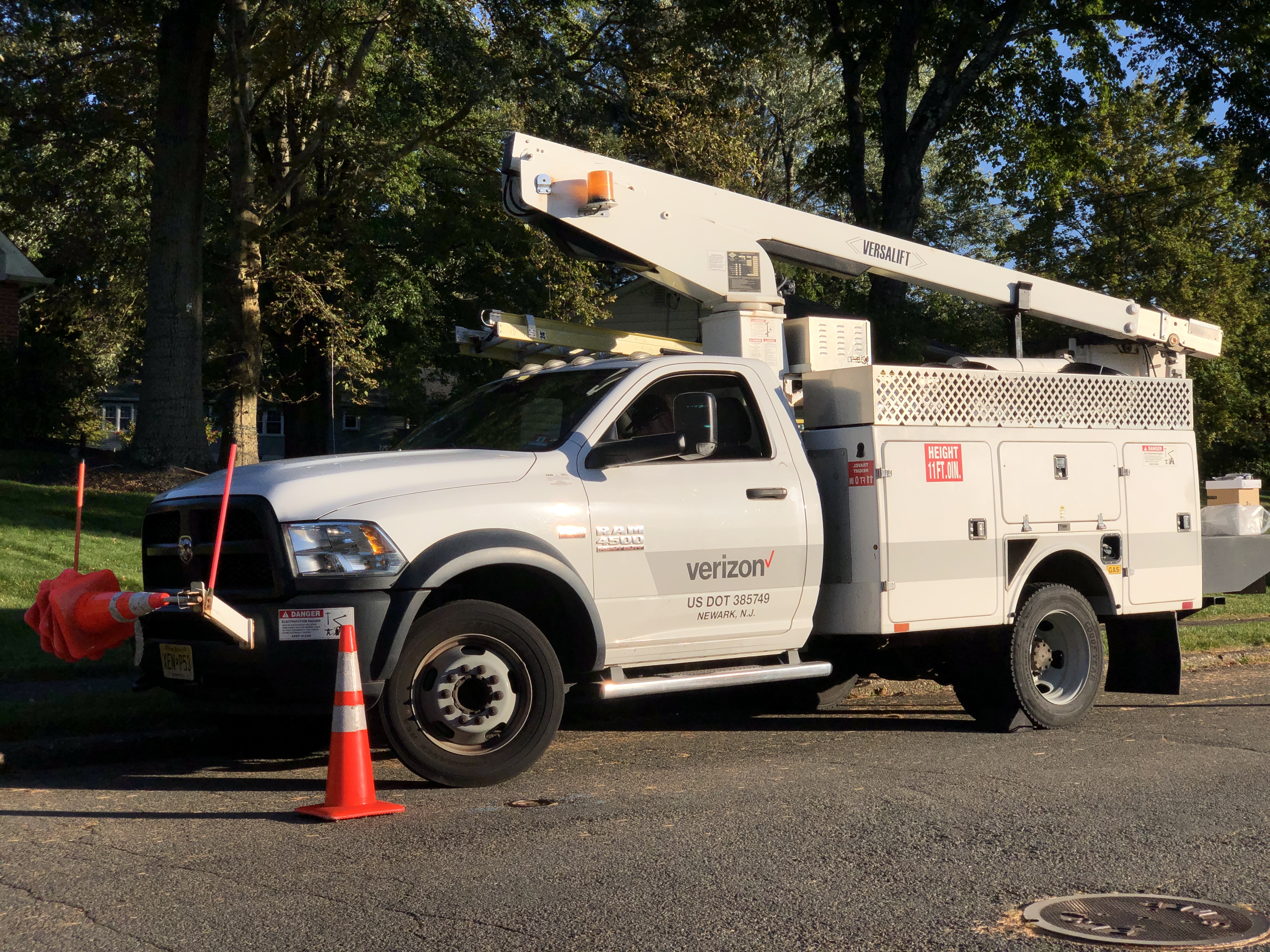
Ram 4500 DS (a medium duty version of the 4th generation Ram pickup), operated by Verizon

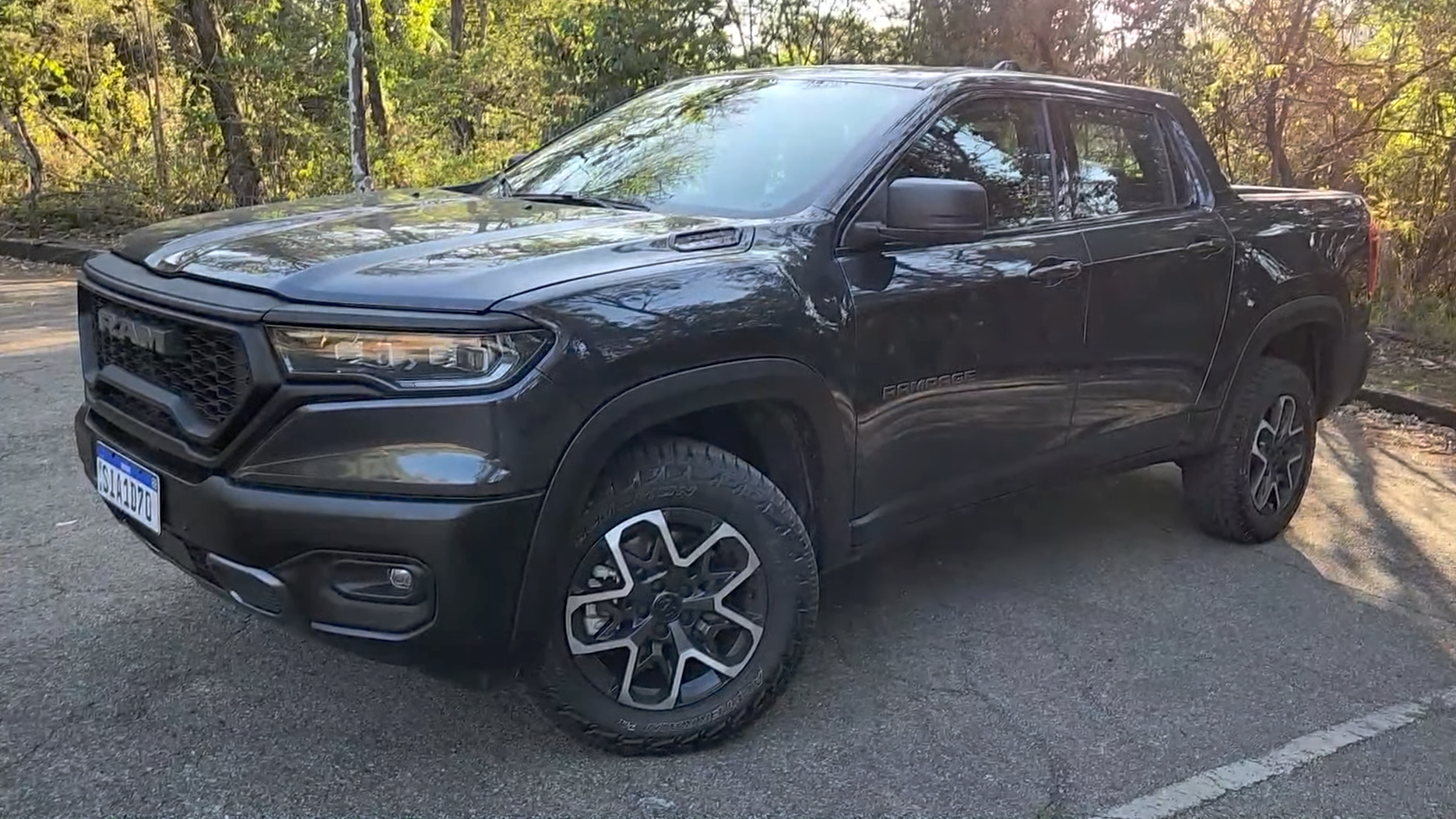
Ram Rampage

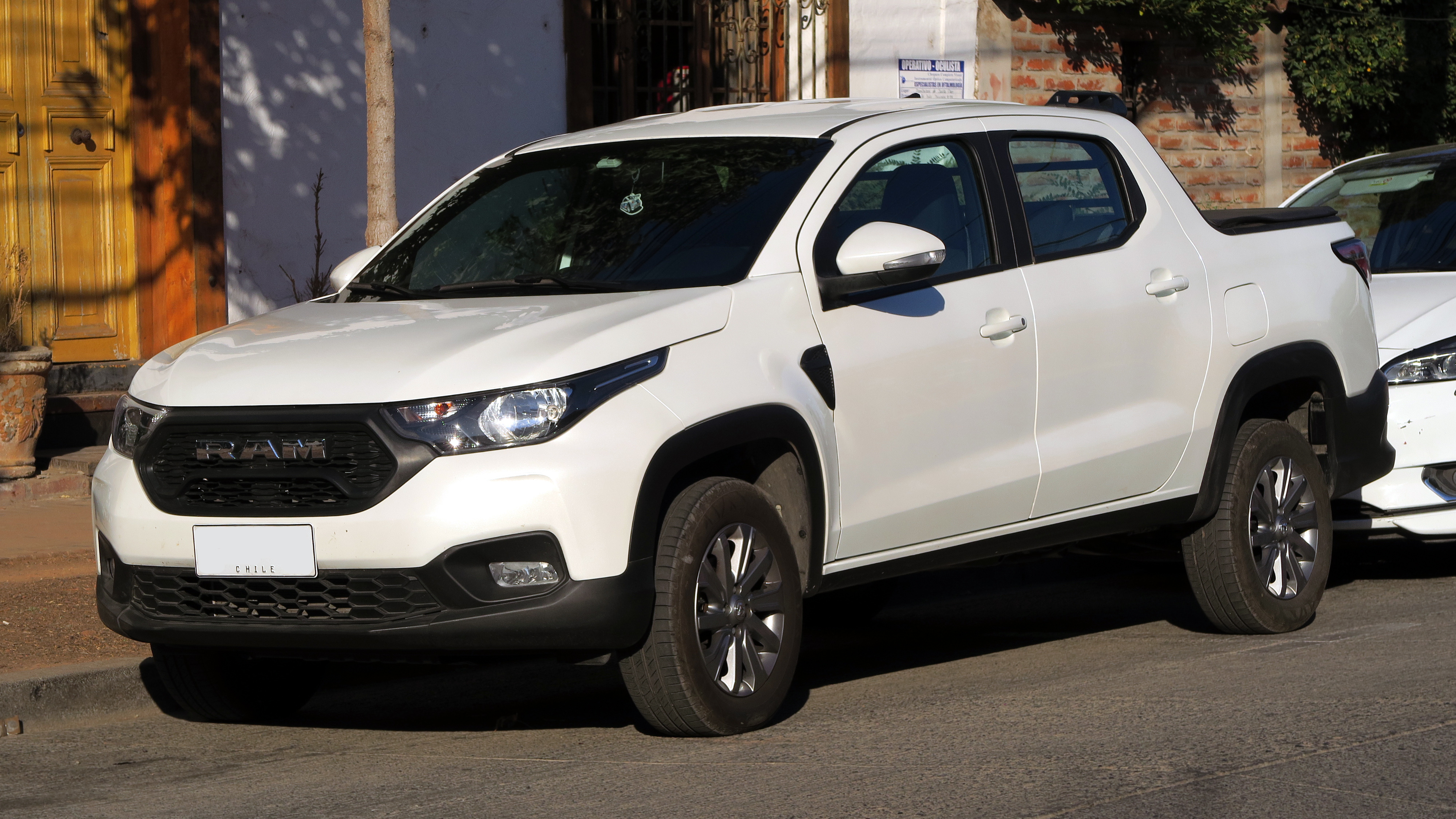
Ram 700

=== Former ===
- Ram 1500 (DS) (2009–2024): Fourth-generation Ram 1500, sold as the Ram 1500 Classic from 2019 through 2024.
- Dodge Dakota (1987–2011): A mid-size pickup, it was moved to the Ram marque with the full-size pickup lineup, although the vehicle retained its physical Dodge branding. It was also rebadged as the Mitsubishi Raider.
- Ram H100: The Hyundai Starex was sold as a Ram in Mexico, although the Hyundai badges were kept.
- Ram C/V Tradesman (2012–2015): Cargo versions of the then-current Chrysler minivan platform were sold under the Ram marque until replaced by the ProMaster City.
- Ram 1200 (2016–2019): The Fiat Fullback / Mitsubishi Triton, a midsize pickup built by a Fiat–Mitsubishi joint venture, was sold as the Ram 1200 in the United Arab Emirates.
- Ram ProMaster City/Ram V1000 (2014–2023): The Fiat Doblò van is sold as the Ram ProMaster City in North America and the Ram V1000 in Chile.
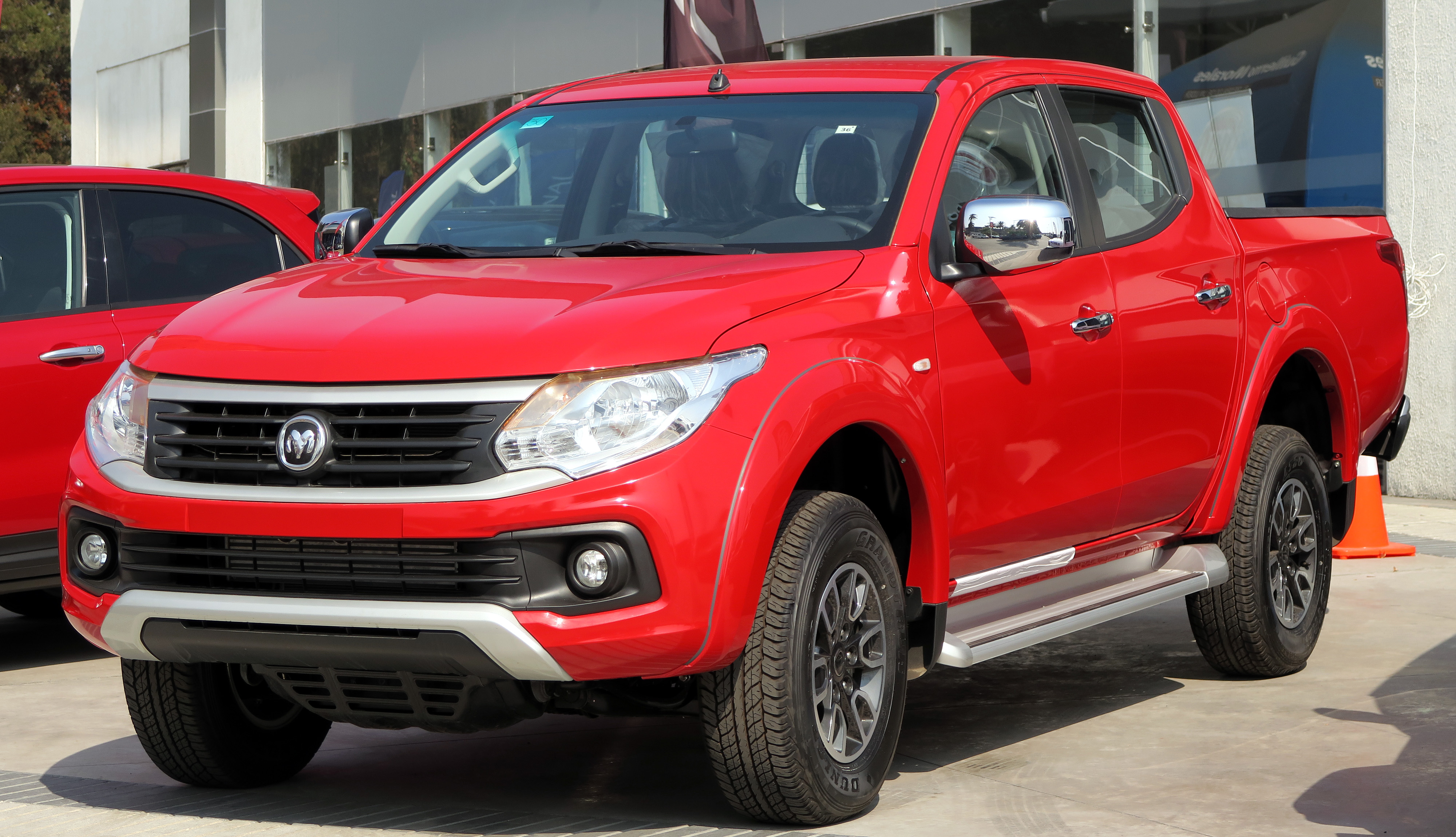
Ram 1200

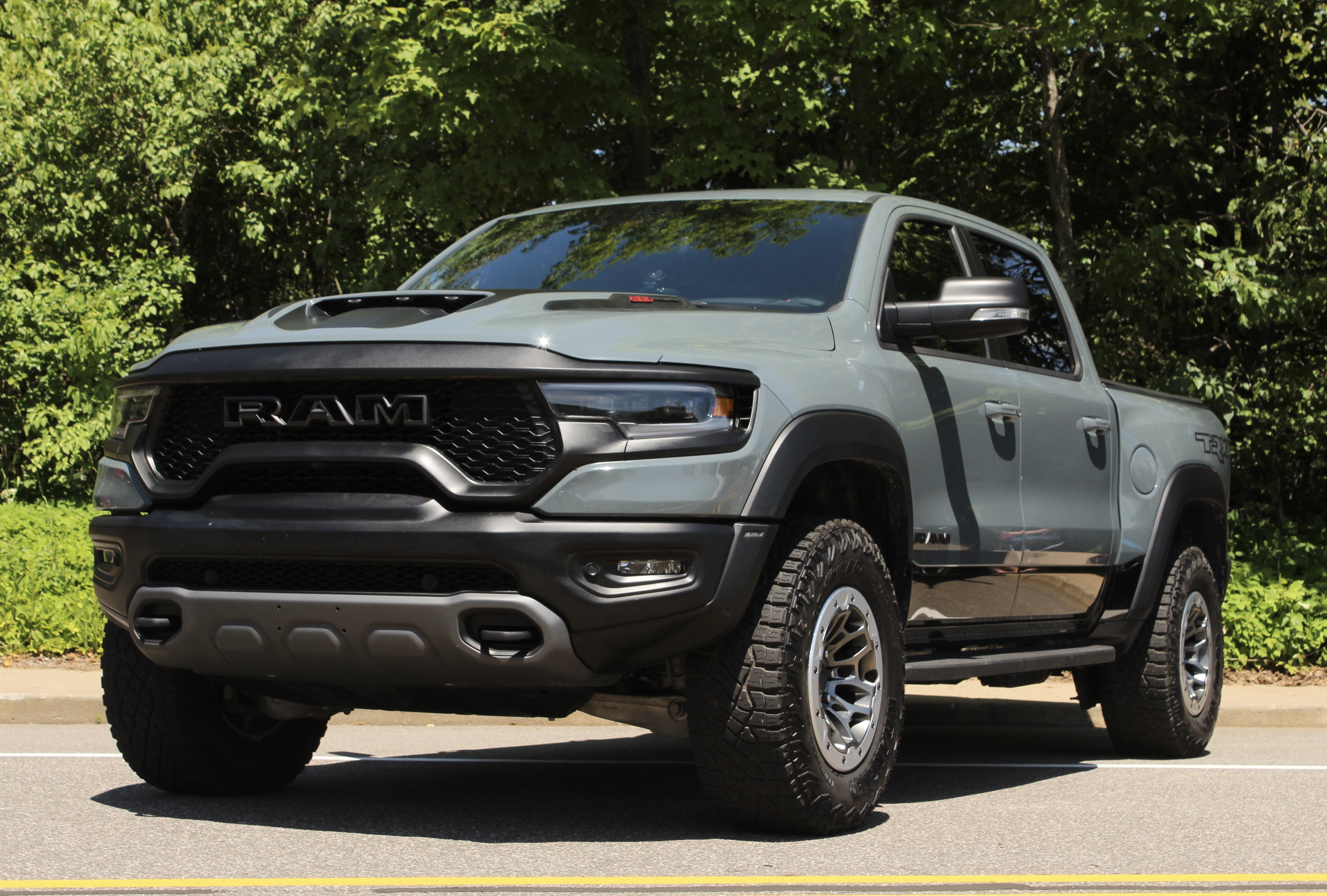
Ram 1500 TRX

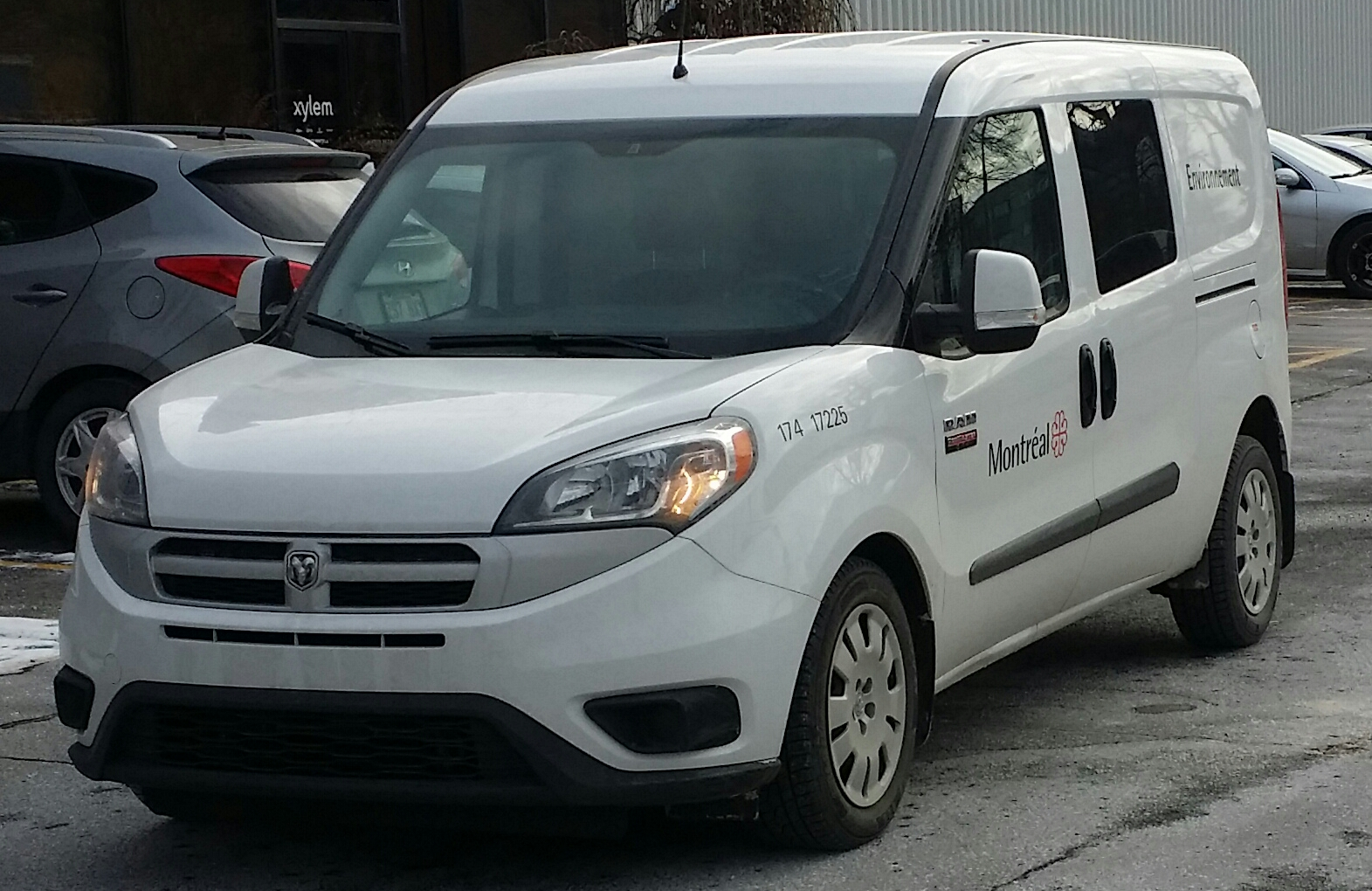
Ram ProMaster City

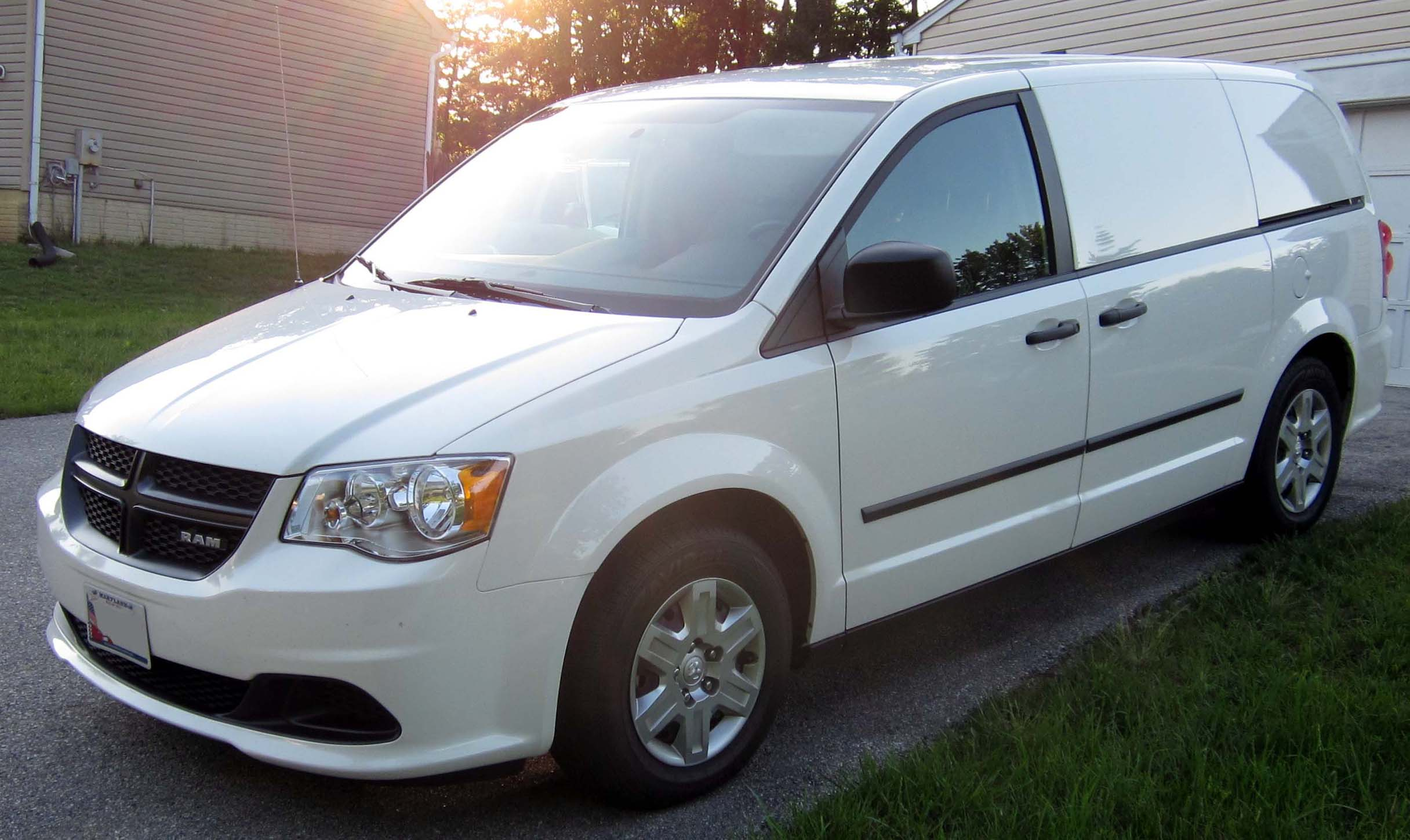
Ram Cargo Van

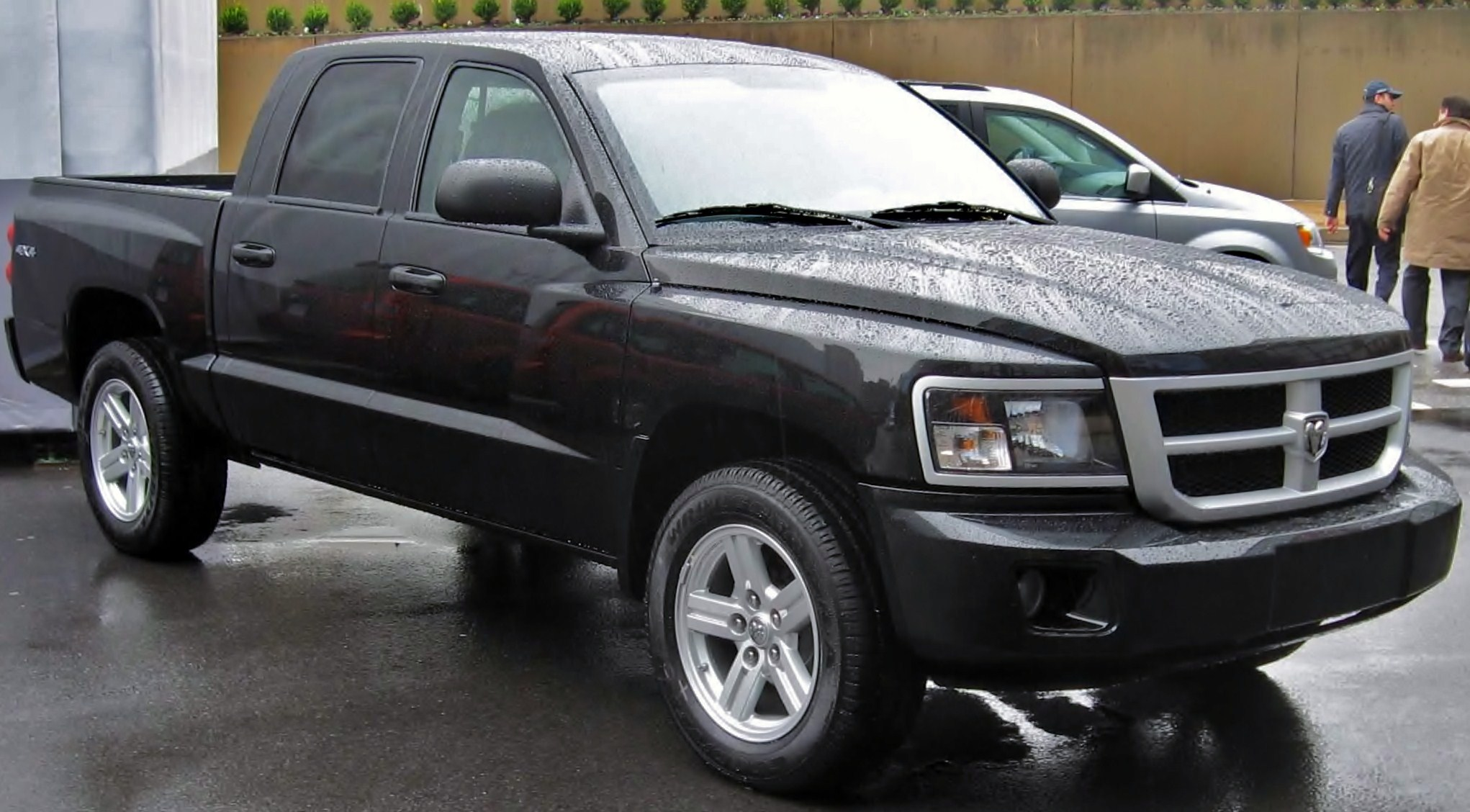
Dodge Dakota

=== Future ===
In 2026, Stellantis published product plans extending to 2030, which include changes to Ram's product lineup in North America. They intend to add the Rampage compact pickup (currently sold in South America), a new Dakota mid-sized pickup, a Ramcharger full-sized SUV, and a return of the ProMaster City, now a mid-sized van.

== Production ==
Ram vehicles are manufactured at five facilities; two in North America, one in Western Asia, and two in South America.

- Sterling Heights Assembly, Sterling Heights, Michigan, United States. This facility was first built in 1953 as the Michigan Ordinance Missile Plant, operated by the US Army. Chrysler Corporation purchased the facility in 1983. The plant currently produces the Ram 1500 (Quad Cab and Crew Cab).
- Saltillo Truck Assembly Plant, Saltillo, Coahuila, Mexico. The facility first opened in 1995. The plant manufactures the Ram 2500-5500 Heavy Duty and the Mexico-only DX Chassis Cab. The plant has won numerous awards and has been recognized as the Chrysler groups best truck facility in terms of build quality. The Saltillo stamping plant is also attached to the facility.
- Tofaş, Bursa, Turkey. The plant produces vehicles primarily for the European market; however, the Ram ProMaster City is produced at Tofaş and imported into North America.
- Goiana, Pernambuco, Brazil. The plant produces vehicles primarily for the Latin American market. The output consist of FCA Small Wide 4×4 and Small Wide 4×4 LWB platform based vehicles, the factory produces Jeep and Ram branded trucks and SUVs. The plant currently produces the Ram Rampage and Ram 1000 (the badge-engineered Fiat Toro), along with the Jeep Renegade, Jeep Compass, and the Jeep Commander.
- Betim, Minas Gerais, Brazil. A Fiat factory that produces the Ram ProMaster Rapid/Ram V700 Rapid (the Latin America-spec badge-engineered Fiat Fiorino) and the Ram 700 (the badge-engineered Fiat Strada).

== In popular culture ==
Ram Trucks entered popular culture in an unintentional way on February 4, 2018, during Super Bowl LII. Their commercial's use of Martin Luther King Jr.'s sermon "The Drum Major Instinct" was quickly and widely panned by audiences, academics, news outlets and social media alike. Of particular concern was its usage of a speech in which King condemned advertising ("we are so often taken by advertisers ... those gentlemen of massive verbal persuasion") to sell more Ram Trucks. Within hours, content creators on YouTube had made spin-offs ("What Martin Luther King Actually Thought About Car Commercials", "The MLK Super Bowl Ad Dodge Didn't Show You", "What Dodge LEFT OUT Of Their MLK Commercial In Super Bowl", etc.) that showed a more accurate perspective of King's sermon and opinions about advertising.

Ram trucks feature prominently in Taylor Sheridan's Yellowstone television series as the chosen work vehicles of the Yellowstone Dutton Ranch, featuring the ranch's logo and branding on the sides of the vehicles. The trucks feature a variety of configurations, mostly 2500-series trucks with the 6.7L Cummins diesel.

== European versions of Ram vans ==
Fiat Professional was FCA's global light commercial vehicle brand marketed outside North America, marketing the same vans marketed as Ram in the Americas. In the other part of Stellantis, PSA, and all brands except DS Automobiles sell vans in three sizes under their respective brands.
