= Reid Bigland =

Business executive

- Employer: Chrysler (formerly)
- Known for: Former CEO of Alfa Romeo, Dodge, Ram Trucks, and Maserati

Reid Bigland is a business executive who was the President of Freightliner Trucks in 2002. He was later appointed as the Chairman and CEO of DaimlerChrysler Canada in July 2006.

In 2011, Bigland was appointed as the CEO of Dodge, but would later be replaced by Tim Kuniskis, after Reid was appointed as the CEO of Ram Trucks in 2013. In 2016, he would be appointed as the CEO of Alfa Romeo, and Maserati.

== Whistleblower lawsuit and resignation ==
In 2019, Bigland filed a Whistleblower Lawsuit against Fiat Chrysler Automobiles after claiming his pay was cut by 90 percent. The case was settled, and in April of 2020, Bigland resigned from FCA to "pursue interests outside of FCA."
