= Changan F70 =

Mid-size pickup truck

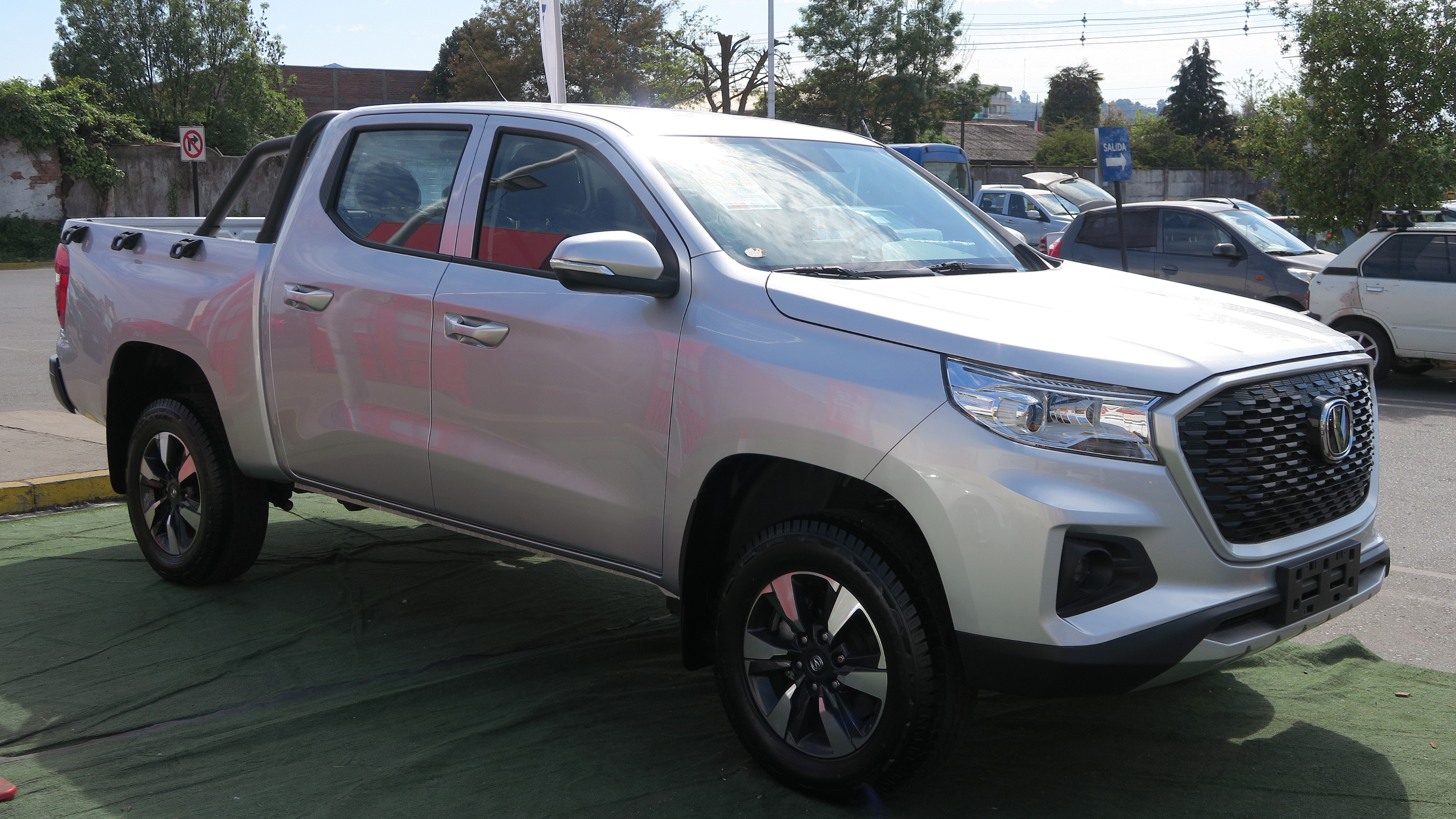

Overview
- Manufacturer: Changan Automobile
- Also called: Kaicene F70 (2019–2023); Changan Hunter; Changan F70 Hunter; Changan Lantuozhe; Peugeot Landtrek; FIAT Titano; RAM 1200; RAM Dakota; Changan Nevo Hunter K50; Deepal Hunter K50 (export)
- Production: 2019–present
- Assembly: China: Hebei (Hebei Changan)

Body and chassis
- Class: Mid-size pickup truck
- Body style: 2-door regular cab 4-door extended cab 4-door crew cab
- Layout: Front-engine, rear-wheel-drive; Front-engine, four-wheel-drive

Powertrain
- Engine: Petrol: 2.4 L 4K22D4T turbo I4; Diesel: 1.9 L D20TCIE turbo I4; 2.5 L JE4D25 I4; Petrol range extender: 2.0 L JL486ZQ6 turbo I4
- Transmission: 6-speed manual; 6-speed automatic; 8-speed automatic ZF; Single-speed gear reduction (EREV)
- Hybrid drivetrain: Series hybrid EREV
- Battery: 31.18 kWh (EREV)
- Range: 1,031 km (641 mi) (EREV, CLTC); 900 km (559 mi) (EREV, NEDC)
- Electric range: 180 km (112 mi) (EREV, CLTC); 131 km (81 mi) (EREV, NEDC)
- Plug-in charging: V2L: 3.3 kW standard, 22 kW optional (EREV)

Dimensions
- Wheelbase: 3,180 mm (125.2 in); 3,430 mm (135.0 in) (LWB)
- Length: 5,390 mm (212.2 in) (single cab); 5,330 mm (209.8 in) (double cab)
- Width: 1,920 mm (75.6 in)
- Height: 1,819 mm (71.6 in)

The Changan F70, previously known as Kaicene F70, is a mid-size pickup truck that has been jointly developed by Changan Automobile and Groupe PSA under the Kaicene sub-brand since 2019.

A refreshed version known as the Changan Lantuozhe (览拓者) or Changan Hunter launched in China in 2022 and is available with petrol and range-extender powertrains.

== Powertrain ==
The Kaicene F70 is powered by four cylinder engines including a 2.4-litre petrol engine and a 1.9-litre diesel engine, as well as a 2.5-litre diesel engine.

Engines
Model	Displacement	Fuel	Engine	Transmission	Power	Torque	Emission Standard
Shenyang Mitsubishi 4K22D4T	2.4 L (2,400.0 cc)	Petrol	I4	six speed manual/automatic	218 bhp (221 PS; 163 kW)	320 N⋅m (236 lb⋅ft)	Euro 5
Shenyang Mitsubishi 4K22D4T	2.4 L (2,400.0 cc)	Petrol	I4	six speed manual/automatic	211 bhp (214 PS; 157 kW)	320 N⋅m (236 lb⋅ft)	Euro 6
Kunming Yunnei D20TCIE 1.9	1,910 cc (1.9 L)	Diesel	I4	six speed manual/automatic	150 bhp (152 PS; 112 kW)	350 N⋅m (258 lb⋅ft) at 1800-8400 rpm	Euro 5
Jiangxi Isuzu JE4D25Q5A	2.5 L (2,500.0 cc)	Diesel	I4	six speed manual/automatic	129 bhp (131 PS; 96 kW)	320 N⋅m (236 lb⋅ft)	Euro 5
Jiangxi Isuzu JE4D25Q6A	2.5 L (2,500.0 cc)	Diesel	I4	six speed manual/automatic	150 bhp (152 PS; 112 kW)	360 N⋅m (266 lb⋅ft)	Euro 6

== Changan Lantuozhe ==
The Changan Lantuozhe (览拓者) launched in November 2022 is a mid-size pickup truck based on the same platform as the Kaicene F70 with a restyled front end design. The Changan Lantuozhe is powered by a 2.0-liter turbocharged four-cylinder engine with 233 hp (236 PS; 174 kW) and 390 N⋅m (288 lb⋅ft) mated with a 6-speed manual transmission or an 8-speed automatic gearbox from ZF. A Great Wall Motor supplied 2.0-liter turbocharged diesel engine is also available with the peak power limited to 163 hp (165 PS; 122 kW) and maximum torque of 400 N⋅m (295 lb⋅ft).

An electric version of the Lantuozhe called the Changan Lantuozhe EV was unveiled during 2023 Auto Shanghai. The Lantuozhe EV is powered by an electric motor codenamed TZ210XS103 by Inovance Automotive producing 130 kW (174 hp; 177 PS) peak power and 60 kW (80 hp; 82 PS) rated power. The top speed is 130 km/h (81 mph) and the LFP battery is supplied by CATL.

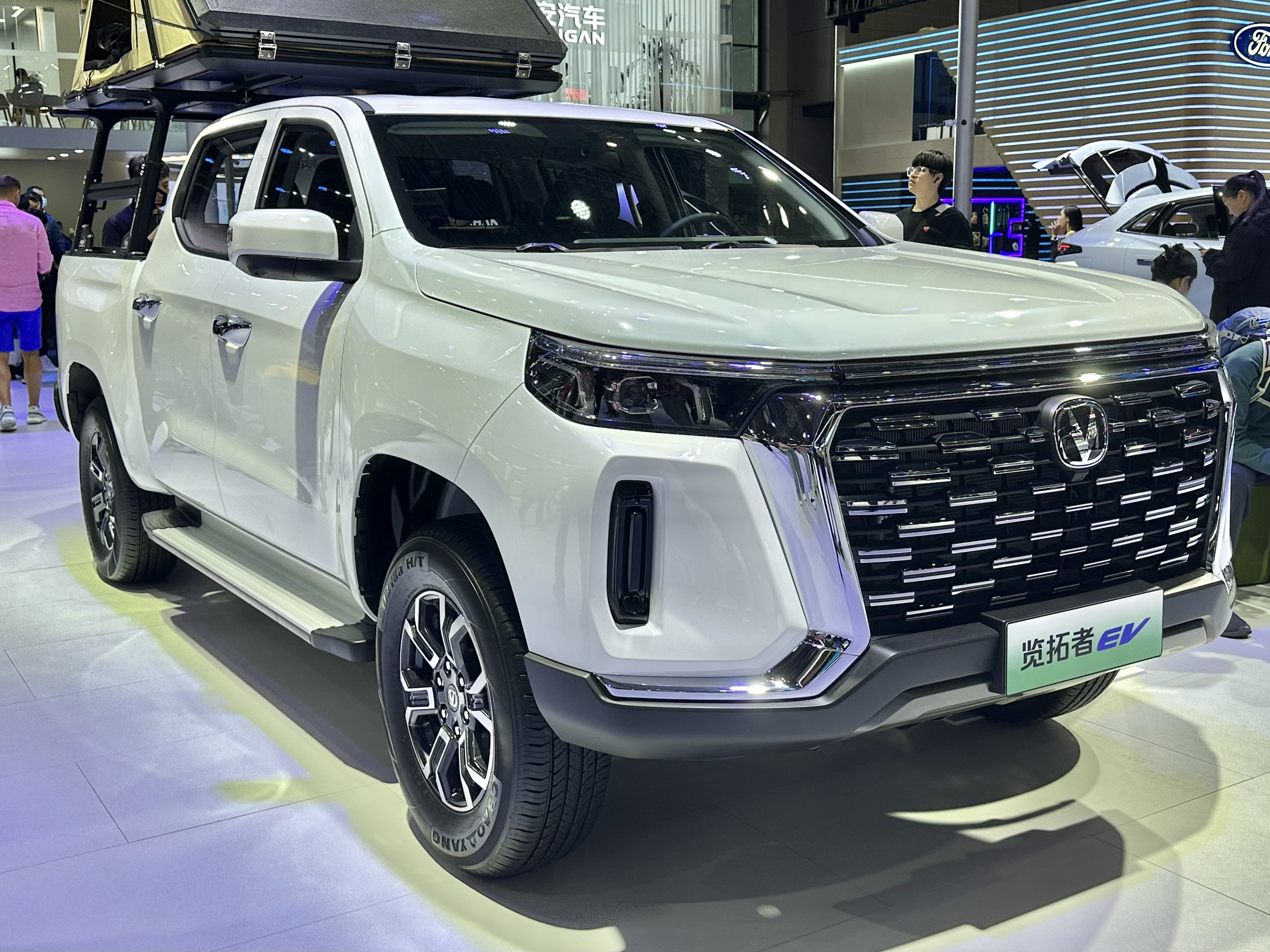
Changan Lantuozhe EV (front)

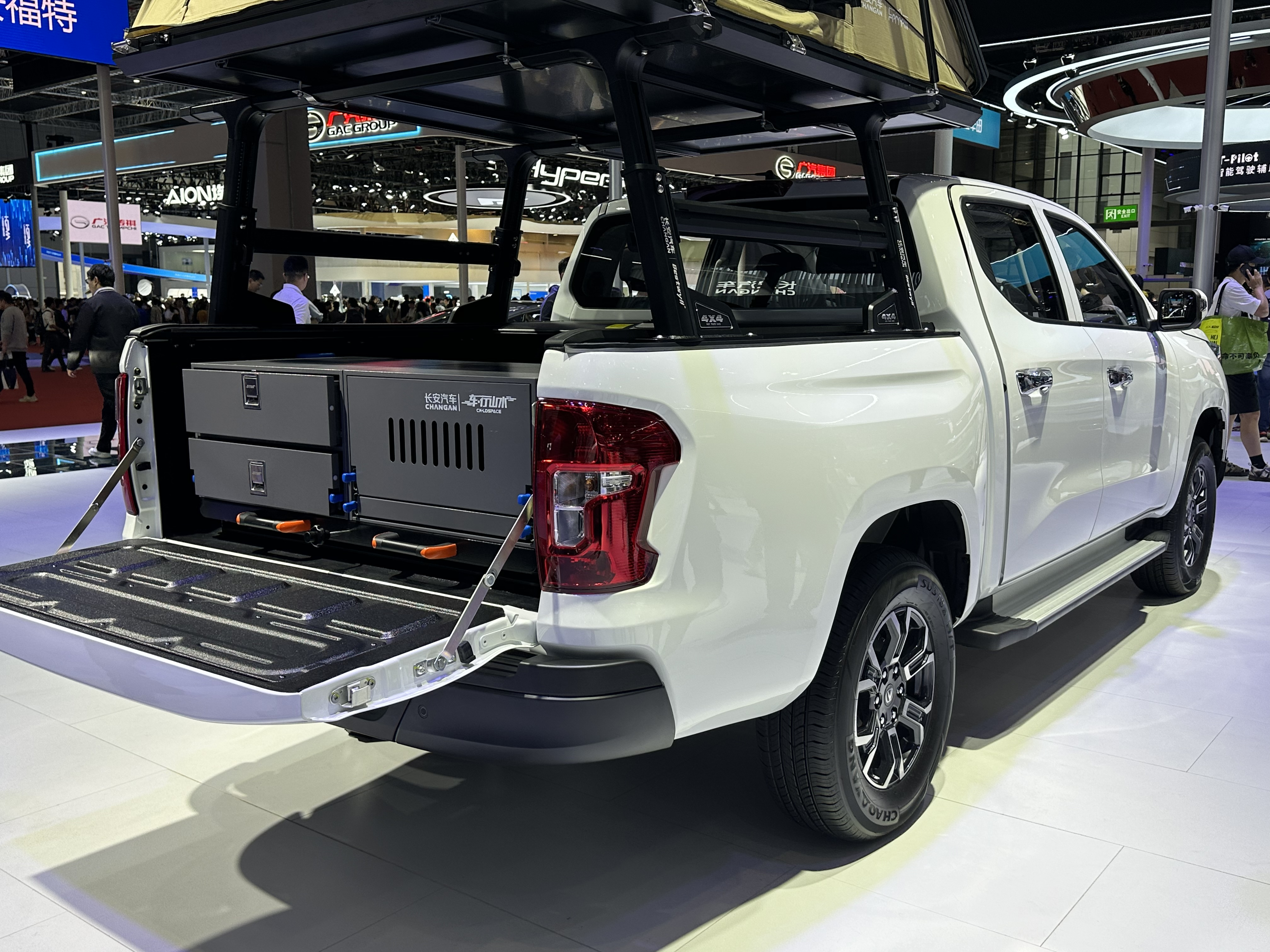
Changan Lantuozhe EV (rear)

== Changan Hunter ==
The Changan Hunter is an extended-range pickup was launched in the Chinese market in December 2023. Despite being previously sold abroad, the Hunter's Chinese domestic market introduction was a restyled facelift model with an extended-range powertrain. The extended-range powertrain includes a 2.0-liter turbocharged JL486ZQ6 engine as an range-extending generator, developing a maximum power output of 188 hp (140 kW; 191 PS). The rear-wheel drive variant uses a 130 kW (174 hp; 177 PS) rear-mounted motor, and the four-wheel drive variant uses a dual-motor setup of 70 kW (94 hp; 95 PS) in the front and 130 kW (174 hp; 177 PS) in the rear. Power is supplied by a 33.18 kWh battery, of which 22.7 kWh is usable. The Changan Hunter extended-range pickup has a pure electric CLTC range of 180 km (112 mi) and a combined CLTC range of 1,031 km (641 mi). A 3.3 kW external power supply function is also available and integrates dual 220V sockets.

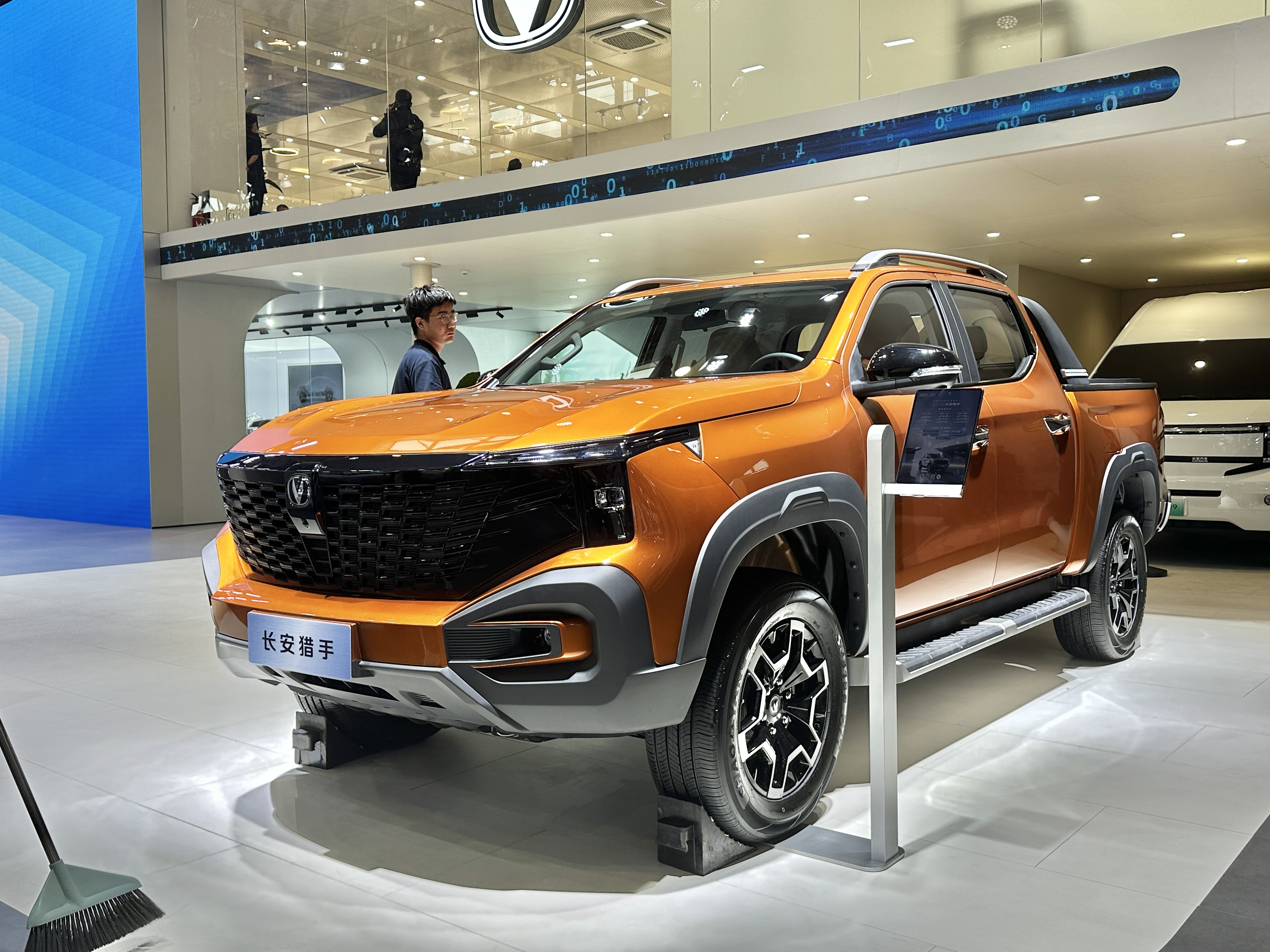
Changan Hunter (front)

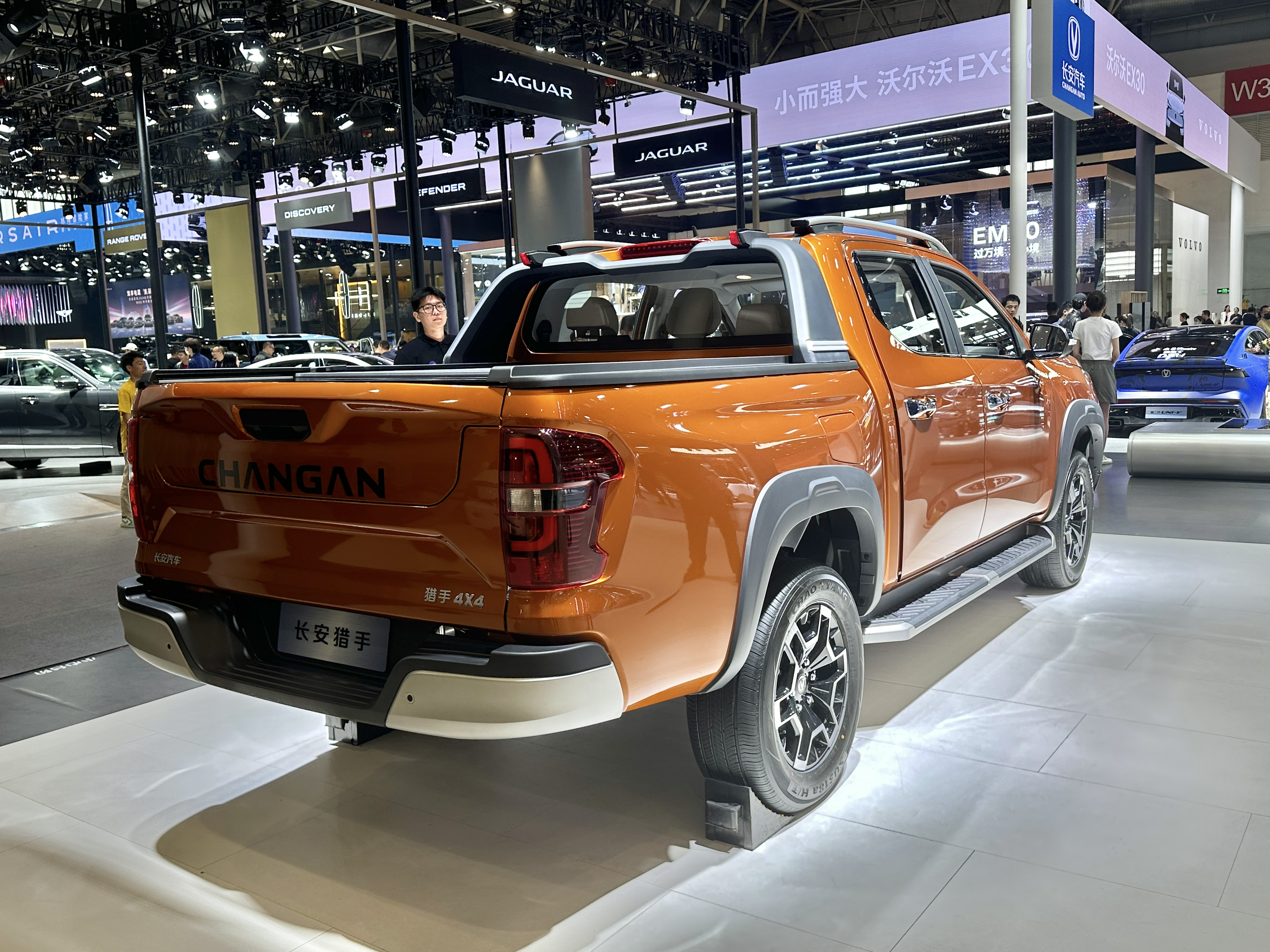
Changan Hunter (rear)

== Changan Nevo Hunter K50 ==
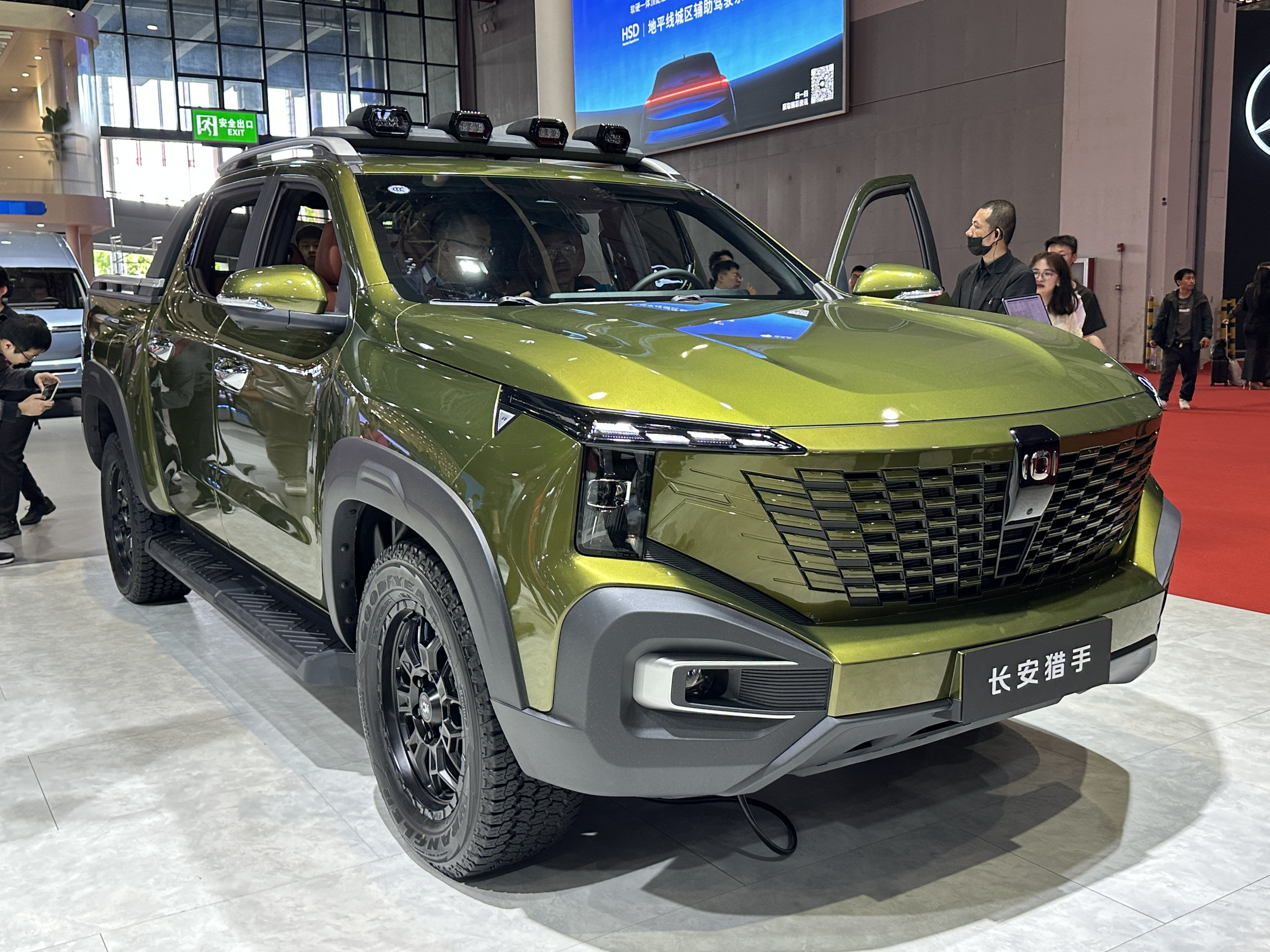
Changan Nevo Hunter K50

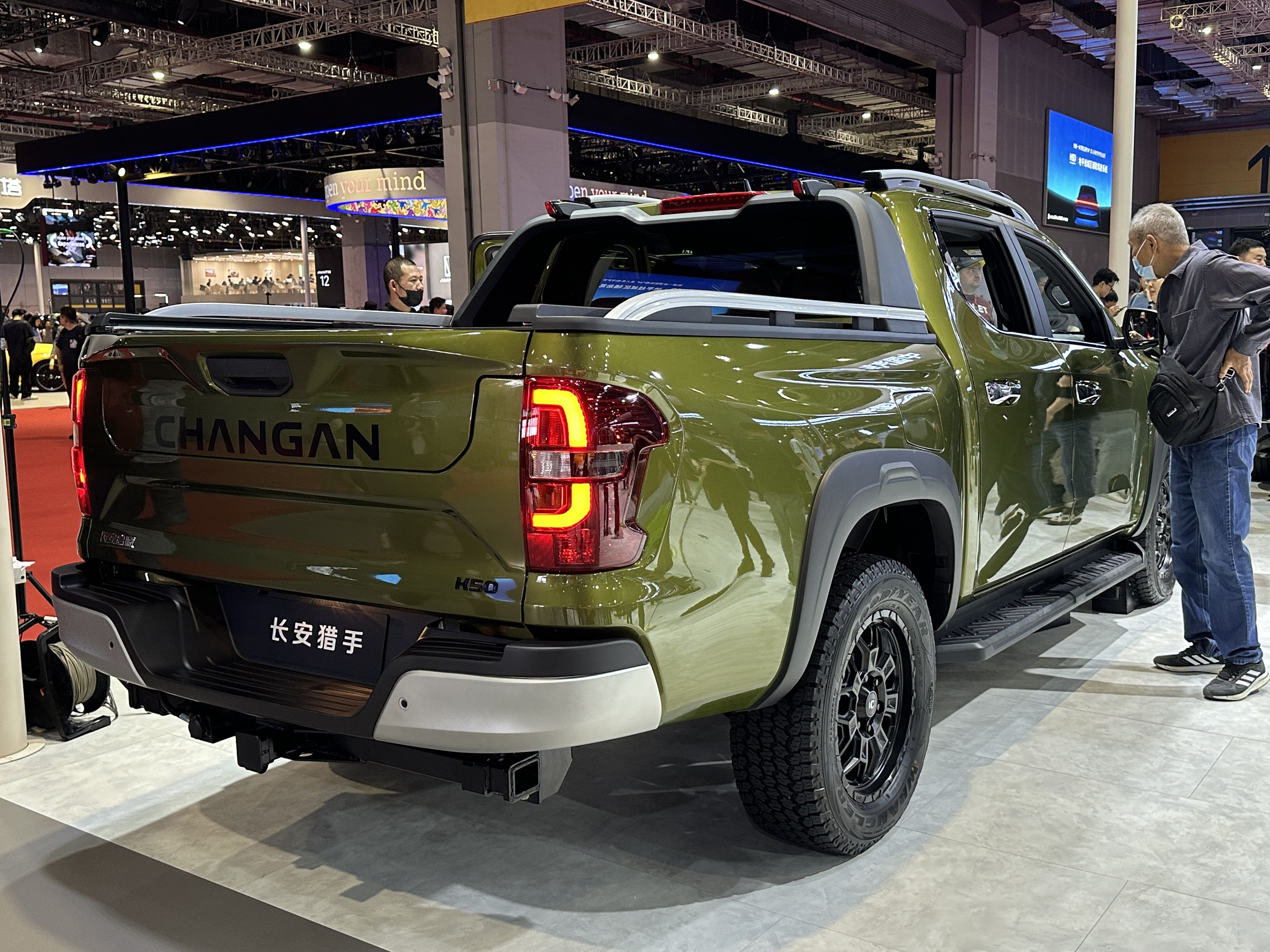
Rear view

== Deepal Hunter K50 ==
The Deepal Hunter K50 is an extended-range pickup was launched in Thailand at Bangkok International Motor Show 2025 on 30 March 2025.

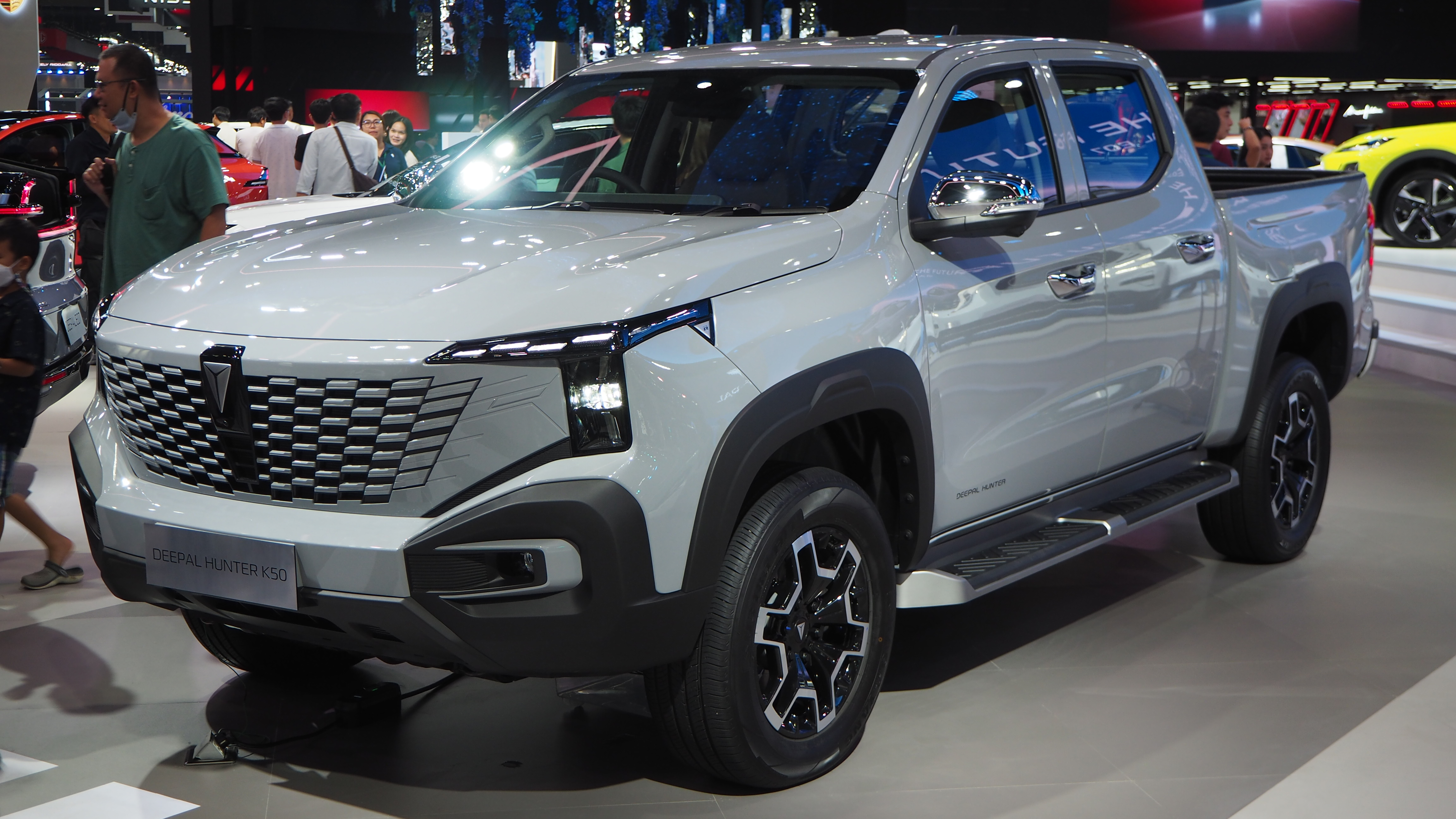
Deepal Hunter K50

== Peugeot Landtrek ==
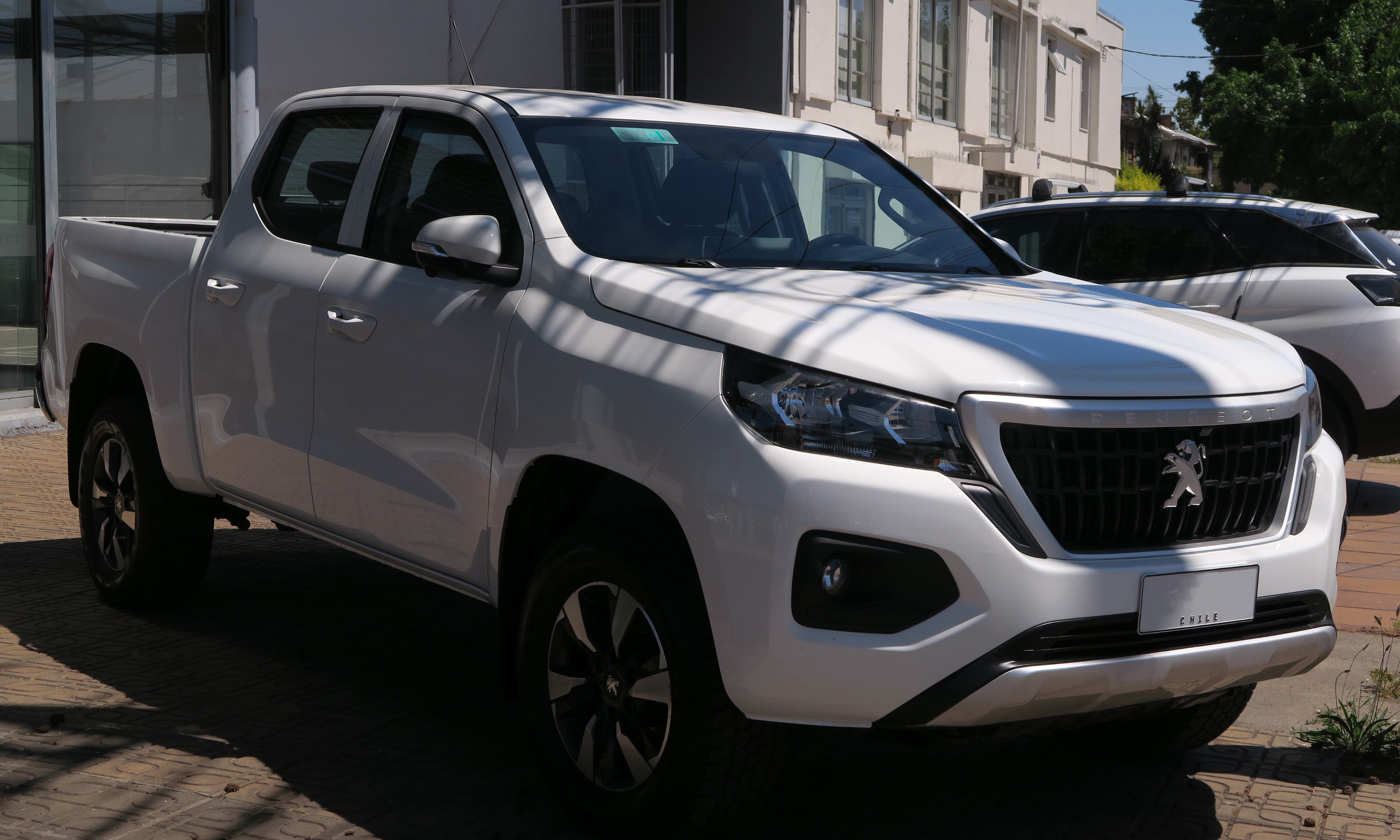
2022 Peugeot Landtrek

The Peugeot Landtrek is a mid-size pickup truck that was first presented by French car manufacturer Peugeot, then part of Groupe PSA, in 2020. The platform and most of the bodywork is based on the Kaicene F70.

The Landtrek is currently only sold in markets in Latin America, Sub-Saharan Africa, Asia and in Ukraine. It was officially introduced on 18 November 2020 for the market in Mexico, the first market in Latin America to sell the Landtrek.

== Sales ==
Year	Mexico
Year	Hunter
2024	683
2025	1,370
