= Fred Diaz =

American automotive executive and corporate director

Fred M. Diaz is an American automotive executive and corporate director. He held senior leadership roles at several global automobile manufacturers, including Fiat Chrysler Automobiles, Nissan North America, and Mitsubishi Motors North America, where he served as president and chief executive officer from 2018 to 2020. After leaving executive management, Diaz transitioned to corporate governance and serves on the boards of multiple publicly traded companies.

== Education ==
Diaz earned a Bachelor of Science degree in Management with a minor in Psychology from Texas Lutheran University and later obtained a Master of Business Administration from Central Michigan University.

== Career ==
=== Fiat Chrysler Automobiles ===
Diaz spent more than two decades at Chrysler, later Fiat Chrysler Automobiles (FCA), where he held a number of senior leadership positions in North America and Latin America.

He served as president and chief executive officer of the Ram Truck brand, overseeing its transition into a standalone division. During this period, the Ram 1500 was named the 2013 North American Truck of the Year.

Diaz also served as president and chief executive officer of Chrysler de México, with responsibility for regional manufacturing, sales, and operations.

=== Nissan North America ===
Following his tenure at FCA, Diaz joined Nissan North America, where he served as Division Vice President and General Manager for Trucks and Light Commercial Vehicles in North America. His responsibilities included oversight of product planning, sales, and marketing across the United States, Canada, and Mexico.

=== Mitsubishi Motors North America ===
In April 2018, Diaz was appointed president, chief executive officer, and chairman of Mitsubishi Motors North America, Inc. (MMNA). During his tenure, MMNA relocated its U.S. headquarters from Cypress, California, to Franklin, Tennessee, consolidating corporate operations in the region.

Diaz stepped down from his executive role at MMNA in April 2020.

=== Board memberships ===
After leaving executive management, Diaz transitioned to corporate governance and has served as an independent director on several public company boards including one Fortune 50 company:

- Valero Energy Corporation – Independent Director and Audit Committee Financial Expert.
- Smith & Wesson Brands, Inc. – Director and Chair of the Sustainability Committee.
- SiteOne Landscape Supply, Inc. – Independent Director.
- Archer Aviation Inc. – Independent Director.

Diaz is a member of the National Association of Corporate Directors and the Latino Corporate Directors Association.
