= Ram Heavy Duty (fifth generation) =

Fifth-generation Ram heavy-duty pickup truck

Ram Heavy Duty (2500 / 3500 / 4500 / 5500)
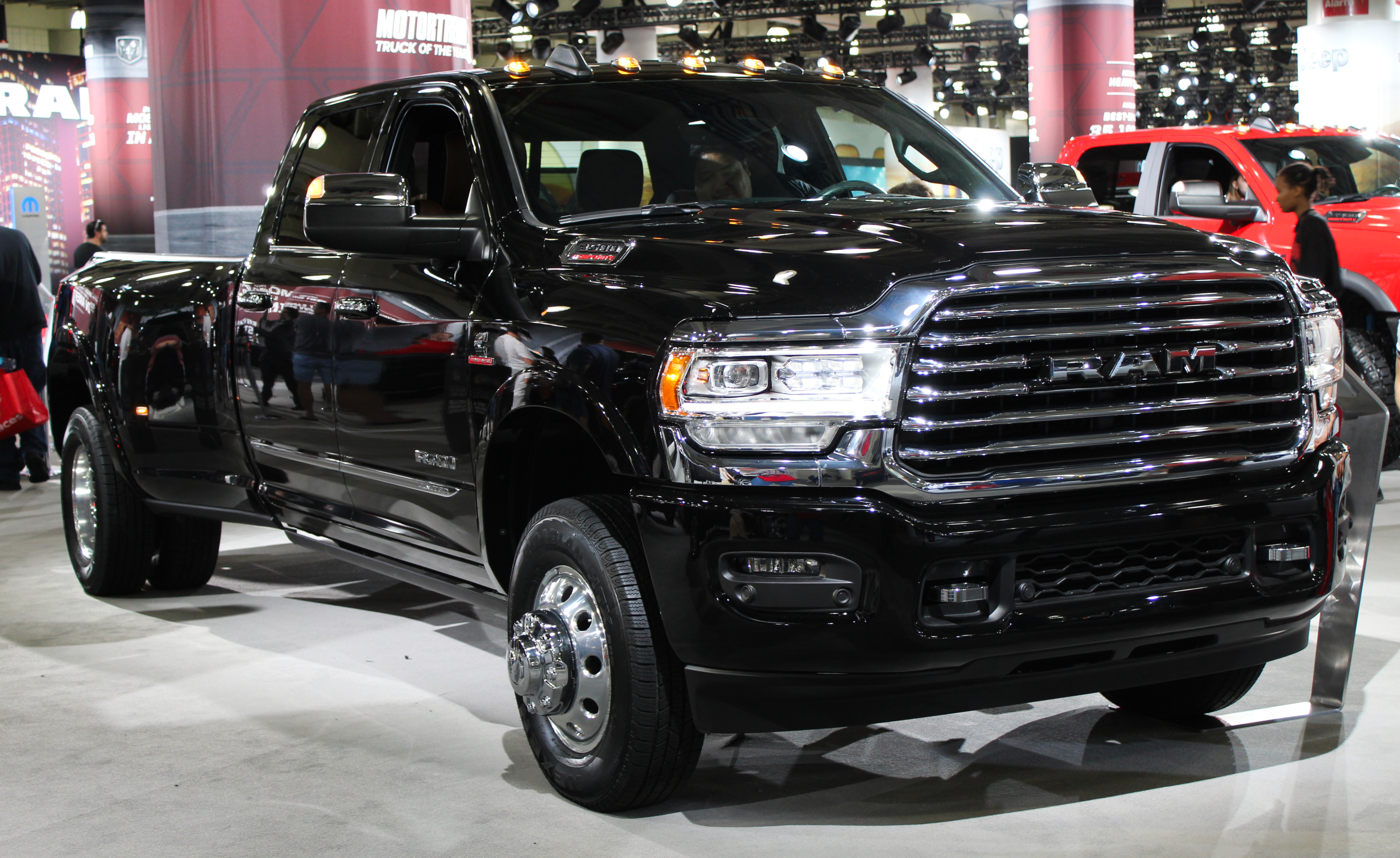
- 2019 Ram 3500 Limited DRW

Overview
- Manufacturer: Ram Trucks (Stellantis)
- Also called: Ram HD
- Production: 2019–present
- Model years: 2019–present
- Assembly: Mexico: Saltillo (Saltillo Truck Assembly)

Body and chassis
- Body style: 2-door regular cab; 4-door crew cab; 4-door extended crew cab
- Related: Ram 1500 (DT); Ram 1500 REV; Ram 1500 TRX; Jeep Wagoneer/Grand Wagoneer (WS)

Powertrain
- Engine: Gasoline: 6.4 L Hemi V8; Diesel: 6.7 L Cummins ISB turbo I6
- Transmission: 8-speed Torqueflite ZF 8HP75-LCV automatic; 8-speed Torqueflite ZF HD 8AP1075 automatic; 6-speed Aisin AS66RC automatic; 6-speed Aisin AS69RC automatic; 6-speed 68RFE automatic

Dimensions
- Wheelbase: 140.2–169.3 in (3,560–4,300 mm)
- Length: 232–260.8 in (5,890–6,620 mm)
- Width: 83.5 or 96.5 in (2,120 or 2,450 mm)
- Height: 78–80.4 in (1,980–2,040 mm)

Chronology
- Predecessor: Ram Heavy Duty (fourth generation)

The Ram Heavy Duty (also known as the Ram HD) is the 5th generation of the Ram Pickup. Ram Pickup is a series of heavy-duty pickup trucks produced by the Ram Trucks division of Stellantis. Slotted above the Ram 1500, the Heavy Duty trucks range from the Ram 2500 to the Ram 5500. The Ram 2500 and Ram 3500 are offered as pickup trucks, while the Ram 3500 through Ram 5500 are offered as chassis cabs.

Introduced in January 2019 at the North American International Auto Show in Detroit, Michigan, the current Ram Heavy Duty trucks are based on the Ram 1500 (DT). Ram Heavy-Duty models are produced at Saltillo Truck Assembly in Saltillo, Mexico.

== Cab configurations ==
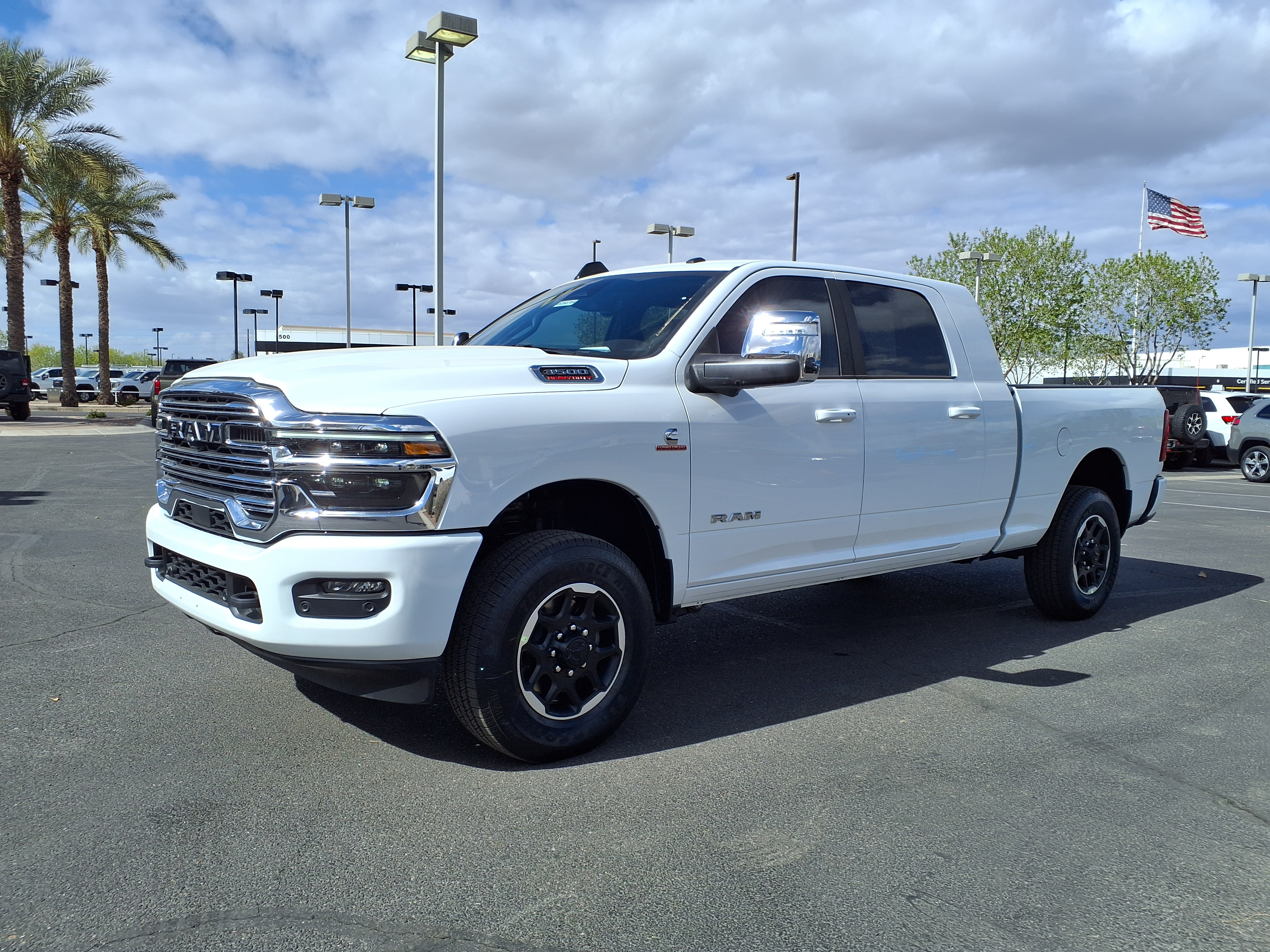
2025 Ram 3500 SRW (Facelift)

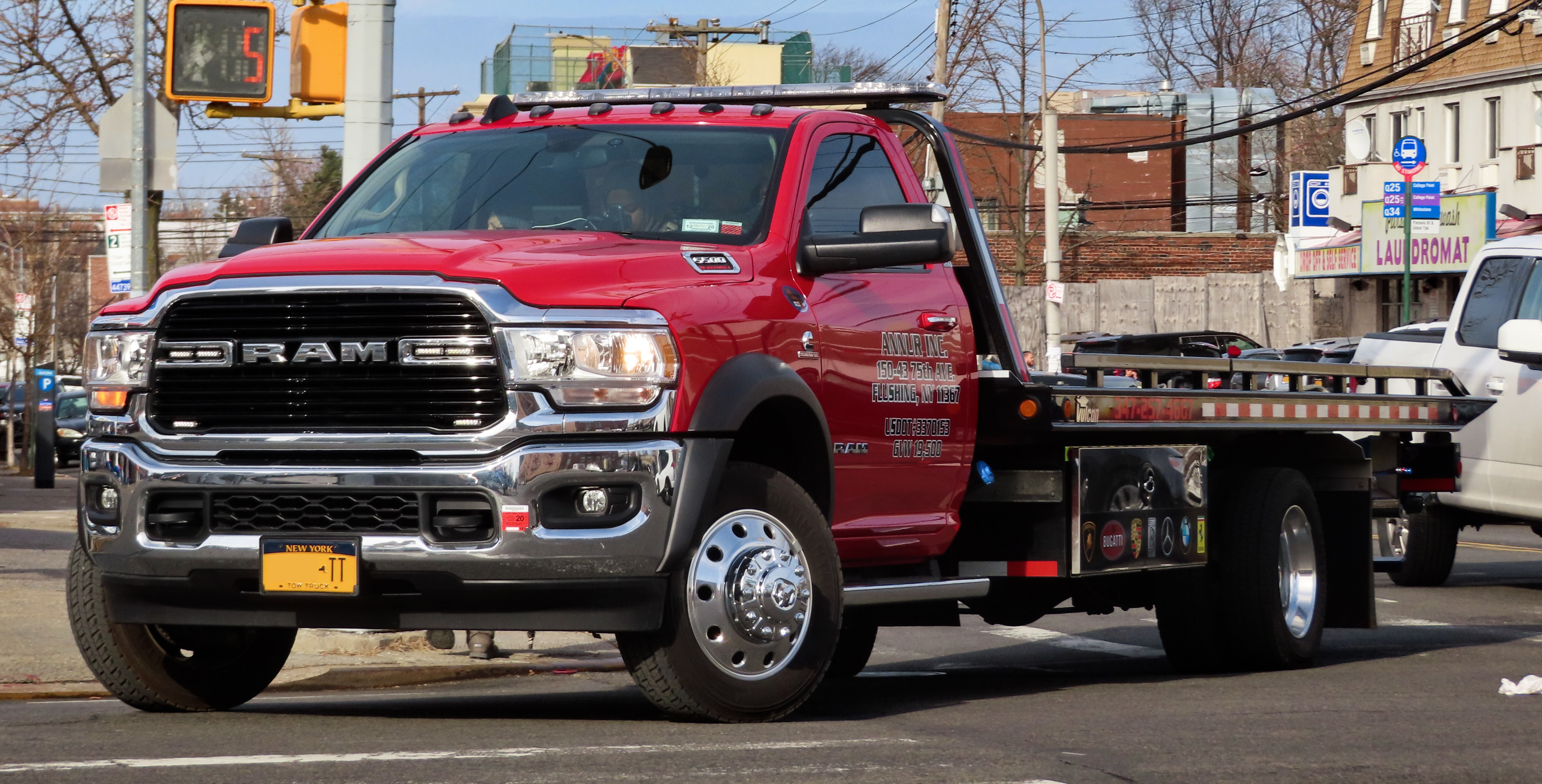
Ram 5500 tow truck

The Ram Heavy Duty is available in three different configurations: a two-door regular cab with a long bed, a four-door crew cab with either a standard bed or a long bed, or a four-door Mega Cab (a crew cab extended by 11.1 in (280 mm) allowing the rear seats to recline or offering more in-cab storage) with a standard bed.

== Trim levels ==
The Tradesman trim level is the most basic trim level with halogen headlamps, incandescent tail lamps, a black plastic grille, and vinyl or cloth seats.

More up-level than the Tradesman, the Big Horn comes standard with everything on the Tradesman plus fog lights, chrome grille, bumpers, and door handles, as well as a leather-wrapped steering wheel. In Texas, this trim level is called Lone Star. On chassis cab models, this trim level is called SLT.

The off-road oriented trim level is the Power Wagon. Only available on the 2500 model, with the crew cab short bed and Hemi V8. The truck is equipped with standard electronic locking front and rear differentials, four-wheel drive, skid plates, a winch, and off-road focused suspension: raised ride height, softer coil springs, Bilstein shocks, Ram Articulink radius arms, and electronic front sway-bar disconnect mechanism. The off-road focused suspension design results in a reduced GVWR of 8650lbs. It also includes unique interior trim and seats, front grille, exterior decal package, and 33” all-terrain tires with unique 17” aluminum-alloy wheels. The name "Power Wagon" refers to the first Dodge Power Wagon trucks that were produced in 1946.

The Rebel trim level offers a less hardcore off-road option, with styling and features from the Power Wagon trim. It features an electronic locking rear differential (but not front), 34-inch all-terrain tires, Bilstein shocks, skid plates, tow hooks, and available winch. It is available with either the Hemi V8 or Cummins diesel, and does not have a reduced GVWR. This trim level is only available with the crew cab short bed configuration, and not available on 3500 or chassis cab models.

The Laramie is the mid-level trim. It features LED headlamps and tail lamps as standard, heated and ventilated leather seats, a standard Uconnect 4 8.4-inch touchscreen, 7-inch digital cluster display, and a memory feature.

An upgrade from the Laramie, the Laramie Longhorn features more luxurious features such as standard navigation, LED projector headlamps, chrome side steps, and genuine wood and leather in the interior. This trim level is not available on chassis cab models.

The Limited trim level is the most luxurious model. A 12-inch touchscreen is standard, as well as safety features such as blind spot monitoring, rear cross path detection, and trailer detection.

== Powertrain ==
The standard engine choice on Ram Heavy Duty trucks is the 6.4 L Hemi V8 gasoline engine, with an available upgrade to a Cummins-sourced ISB I6 diesel engine. The Hemi V8 has been discontinued in the 2025 Mega Cab 2500/3500, however the 6.4 Hemi V8 is still available in all crew cab 2500 models, from Tradesman to Limited Longhorn, and in Tradesman, Big Horn, and Laramie trims for 3500 models. Limited and Limited Longhorn 3500 models are available only with the 6.7 Cummins.

The standard Hemi V8 produces 410 horsepower (306 kW) and 429 pound force-feet (582 N⋅m) of torque. For Chassis Cab models, the engine is downrated to 370 hp (276 kW) but retains the same torque. The engine is equipped with Variable Cam Timing (VCT) and a Multi-Displacement System (MDS) which shuts down four of the engine's eight cylinders when less power is required, saving fuel. For 2500 and 3500, it is mated to a ZF-sourced eight-speed Torqueflite 8HP75 automatic transmission. Optionally on the 3500 and standard on the 4500 and 5500, it is mated to an Aisin-sourced six-speed AS66RC automatic transmission.

The Cummins turbo-diesel is offered in both standard and high-output versions. The standard-output tuning produces 370 horsepower (276 kW) and 850 pound force-feet (1,152 N⋅m) of torque. A high-output tuning, only used on non-chassis cab 3500 models, produces 420 hp (313 kW) and 1,075 lb⋅ft (1,458 N⋅m) of torque. The standard-output version is mated to a Chrysler 68RFE automatic transmission. Chassis cab trucks and high-output tuning are use an Aisin-sourced six-speed AS69RC automatic transmission.

Model	Model years	Engine	Transmission	Power	Torque
2500 pickup	2019–	6.4 L Hemi V8	8-speed Torqueflite ZF 8HP75-LCV automatic	410 hp (306 kW)	429 lb⋅ft (582 N⋅m)
2500 pickup	2019-2024	6.7 L Cummins ISB I6	6-speed 68RFE automatic	370 hp (276 kW)	850 lb⋅ft (1,152 N⋅m)
2500 pickup	2025-	6.7 L Cummins ISB high output I6	8-speed ZF Torqueflite 8AP1075 Powerline automatic	430 hp (321 kW)	1,075 lb⋅ft (1,458 N⋅m)
3500 pickup	2019–	6.4 L Hemi V8	8-speed Torqueflite ZF 8HP75-LCV automatic	410 hp (306 kW)	429 lb⋅ft (582 N⋅m)
3500 pickup	2019-2024	6.7 L Cummins ISB I6	6-speed 68RFE automatic	370 hp (276 kW)	850 lb⋅ft (1,152 N⋅m)
3500 pickup	2019-2024	6.7 L Cummins ISB High-Output I6	6-speed Aisin AS69RC automatic	2019–2020: 400 hp (298 kW); 2021–2024: 420 hp (313 kW)	2019–2020: 1,000 lb⋅ft (1,356 N⋅m); 2021–2024: 1,075 lb⋅ft (1,458 N⋅m)
3500 pickup	2025-	6.7 L Cummins ISB High Output I6	8-speed ZF Torqueflite 8AP1075 Powerline automatic	430 hp (321 kW)	1,075 lb⋅ft (1,458 N⋅m)
3500 chassis cab	2019–	6.4 L Hemi V8	8-speed Torqueflite ZF 8HP75-LCV automatic	370 hp (276 kW)	429 lb⋅ft (582 N⋅m)
3500 chassis cab	2019-2024	6.4 L Hemi V8	6-speed Aisin AS66RC automatic	370 hp (276 kW)	429 lb⋅ft (582 N⋅m)
3500 chassis cab	2025–	6.4 L Hemi V8	8-speed Torqueflite ZF 8AP430 automatic	370 hp (276 kW)	429 lb⋅ft (582 N⋅m)
3500 chassis cab	2019-2024	6.7 L Cummins ISB I6	6-speed Aisin AS69RC automatic	360 hp (268 kW)	800 lb⋅ft (1,085 N⋅m)
3500 chassis cab	2025-	6.7 L Cummins ISB I6	8-speed ZF Torqueflite 8AP1075 Powerline automatic	360 hp (268 kW)	800 lb⋅ft (1,085 N⋅m)
4500/5500 chassis cab	2019-2024	6.4 L Hemi V8	6-speed Aisin AS66RC automatic	370 hp (276 kW)	429 lb⋅ft (582 N⋅m)
4500/5500 chassis cab	2025–	6.4 L Hemi V8	8-speed Torqueflite ZF 8AP430 automatic	370 hp (276 kW)	429 lb⋅ft (582 N⋅m)
4500/5500 chassis cab	2019-2024	6.7 L Cummins ISB I6	6-speed Aisin AS69RC automatic	360 hp (268 kW)	800 lb⋅ft (1,085 N⋅m)
4500/5500 chassis cab	2025-	6.7 L Cummins ISB I6	8-speed ZF Torqueflite 8AP1075 Powerline automatic	360 hp (268 kW)	800 lb⋅ft (1,085 N⋅m)
