= Ram 1200 =

The Ram 1200 an automobile nameplate of Ram used for two different pickup trucks:

- A rebadged version of Fiat Fullback / Mitsubishi Triton produced between 2016 and 2019
- A rebadged version of Peugeot Landtrek / Fiat Titano produced since 2024
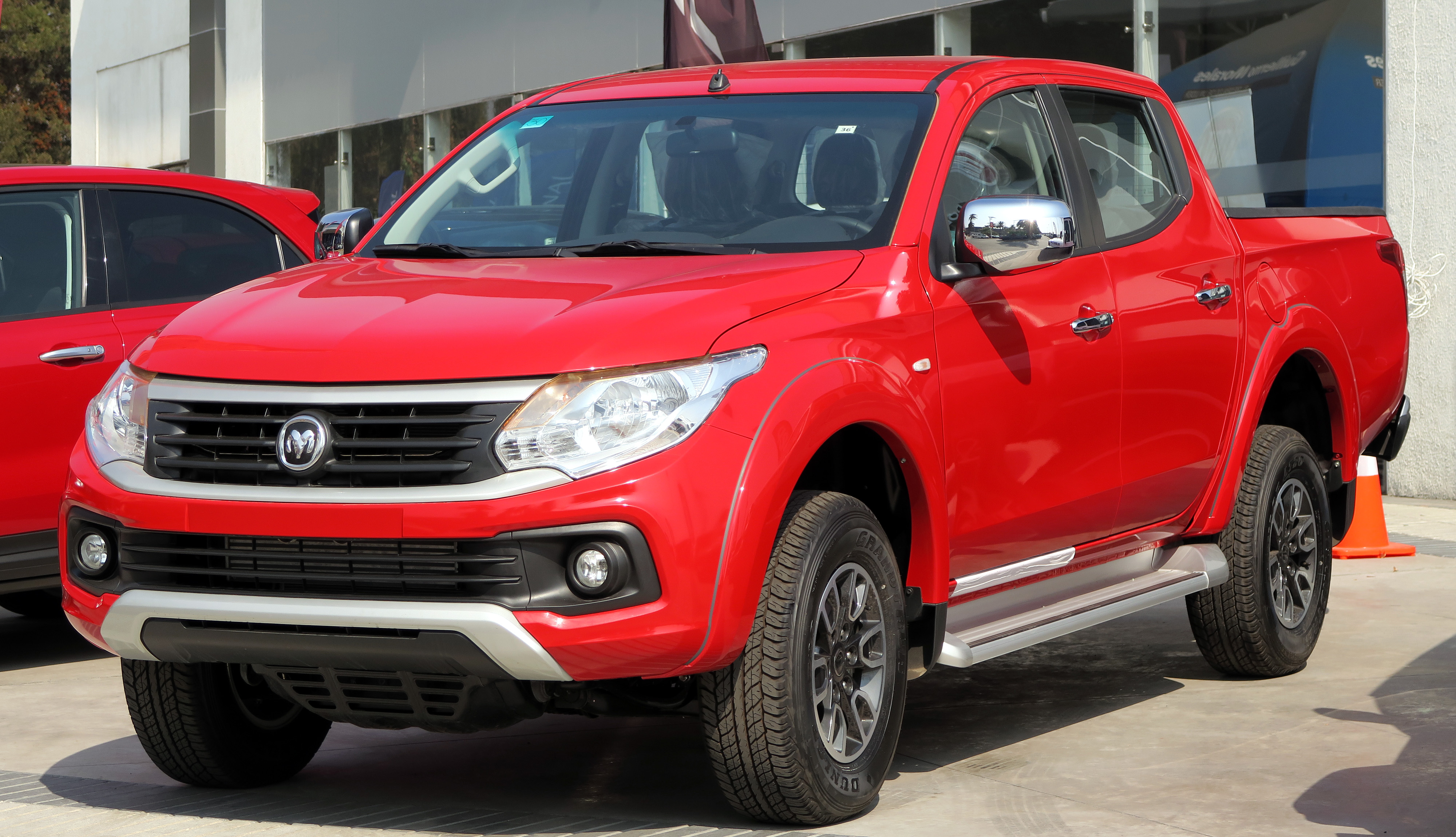
Ram 1200
