= Fiat Fullback =

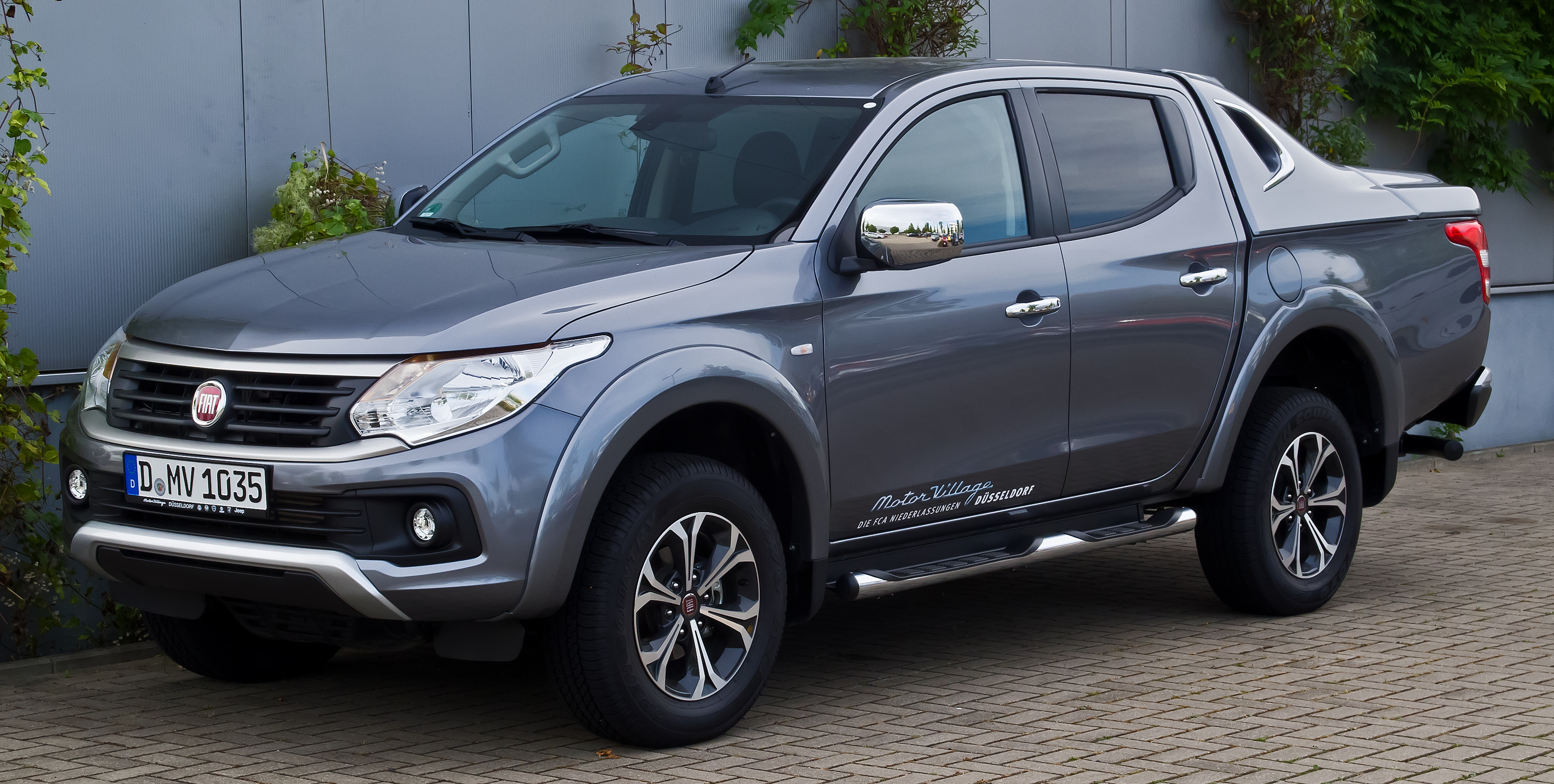

Overview
- Manufacturer: Mitsubishi Motors
- Also called: Mitsubishi Triton/L200; Ram 1200 (Middle East and Africa)
- Production: 2016–2019
- Assembly: Thailand: Laem Chabang (Mitsubishi Thailand)

Body and chassis
- Class: Mid-size pickup truck
- Body style: 2-door pickup; 4-door pickup
- Layout: Front-engine, rear-wheel-drive; Front-engine, four-wheel-drive
- Related: Mitsubishi Pajero Sport

Powertrain
- Engine: 2.4 L 4G64 petrol I4 (Middle East and Africa); 2.4 L Mitsubishi 4N15 TD I4; 2.5 L 4D56 TD I4 (Middle East and Africa)
- Transmission: 6-speed manual; 5-speed automatic

Dimensions
- Wheelbase: 3,000 mm (118.1 in)
- Length: 5,295–5,305 mm (208.5–208.9 in)
- Width: 1,815 mm (71.5 in)
- Height: 1,775 mm (69.9 in)
- Kerb weight: 1,805–1,880 kg (3,979–4,145 lb)

Chronology
- Predecessor: Fiat Strada (Europe)
- Successor: Fiat Titano

The Fiat Fullback is a mid-size pickup truck from the Italian automobile manufacturer Fiat, made from 2016 to 2019. The result of a collaboration agreement between Fiat and the Japanese automaker Mitsubishi Motors signed in 2014, the truck is mechanically identical to the fifth generation of the Mitsubishi Triton/L200, from which the engines also originate. It has been assembled since 2016 in Laem Chabang by Mitsubishi Motors Thailand. The only changes from the L200 are the front grille and some interior finishing specifications, as well as customisations by Mopar.

It is sold in the Europe, the Middle East and Africa (EMEA) selling region, and was introduced at the Dubai International Motor Show on November 10, 2015. In some countries, it is badged as the Ram 1200.

The Fullback is only sold in the EMEA markets as Fiat already produces a pickup for the South American market which is not exported elsewhere, the Fiat Toro, which is similar in size to the Fullback but based on the monocoque chassis of the Jeep Renegade.

The Fullback for the European market is sold in rear-wheel drive or four-wheel drive configuration with a 2.4-liter Mitsubishi 4N15 diesel engine, available in two power variants, 150 PS (110 kW; 148 hp) and 181 PS (133 kW; 179 hp).

On the Middle East and Africa markets, the model will be sold in the 4x2 version with a 2.4-liter gasoline engine with 132 PS (97 kW; 130 hp) and a 2.5 liter diesel in two power versions of 110 PS (81 kW; 108 hp) and 178 PS (131 kW; 176 hp).

Like most of its competitors, the Fullback offers four configurations (single cab, extended cab, double cab, and cab chassis), and three trim levels. All versions have the same height (1780 mm), width (1815 mm) and wheelbase (3000 mm); the length varies depending on the configuration: 5155 mm for the single cab, 5275 mm for the extended cab and 5285 mm for the double cab.

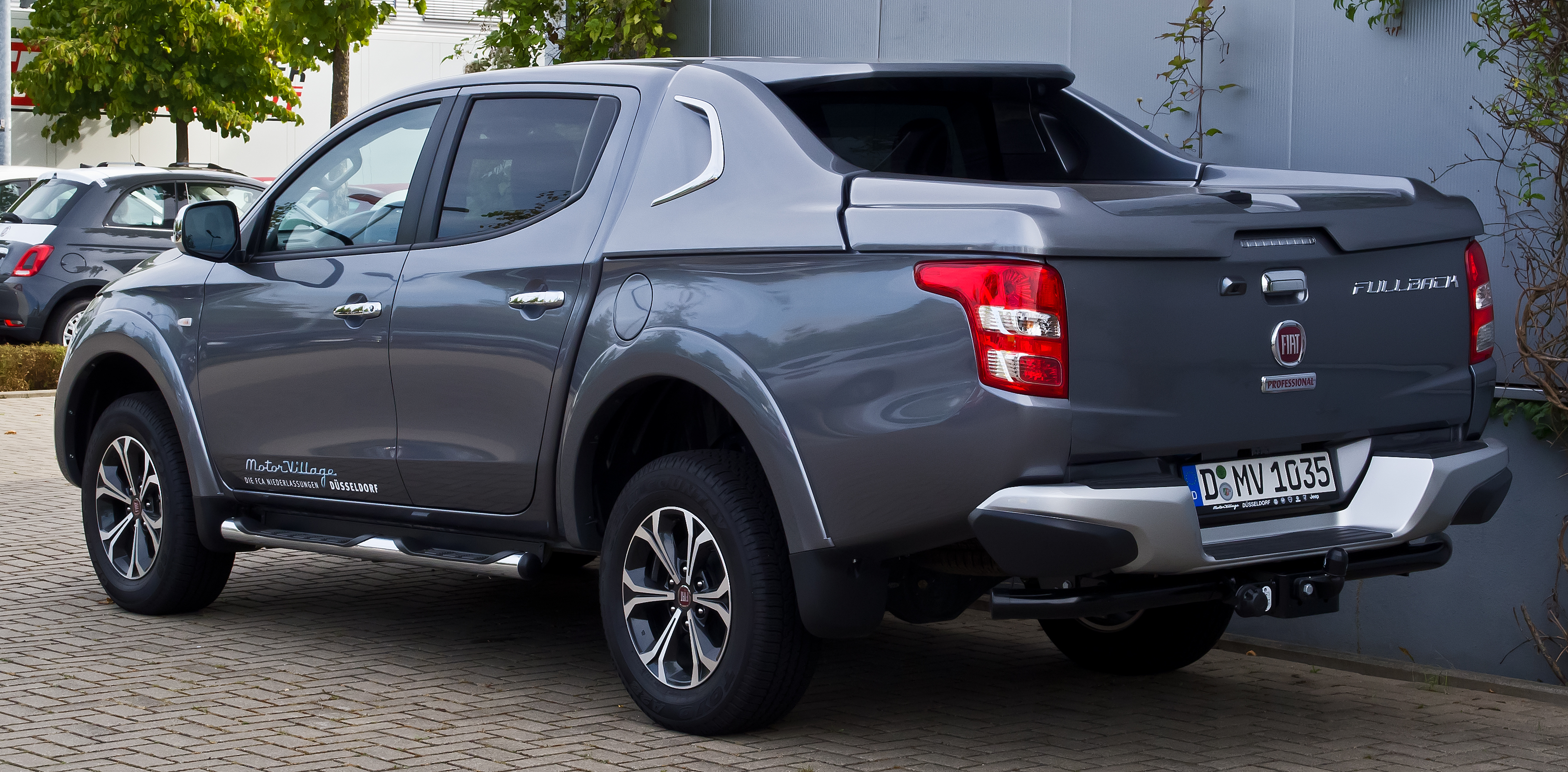
Rear

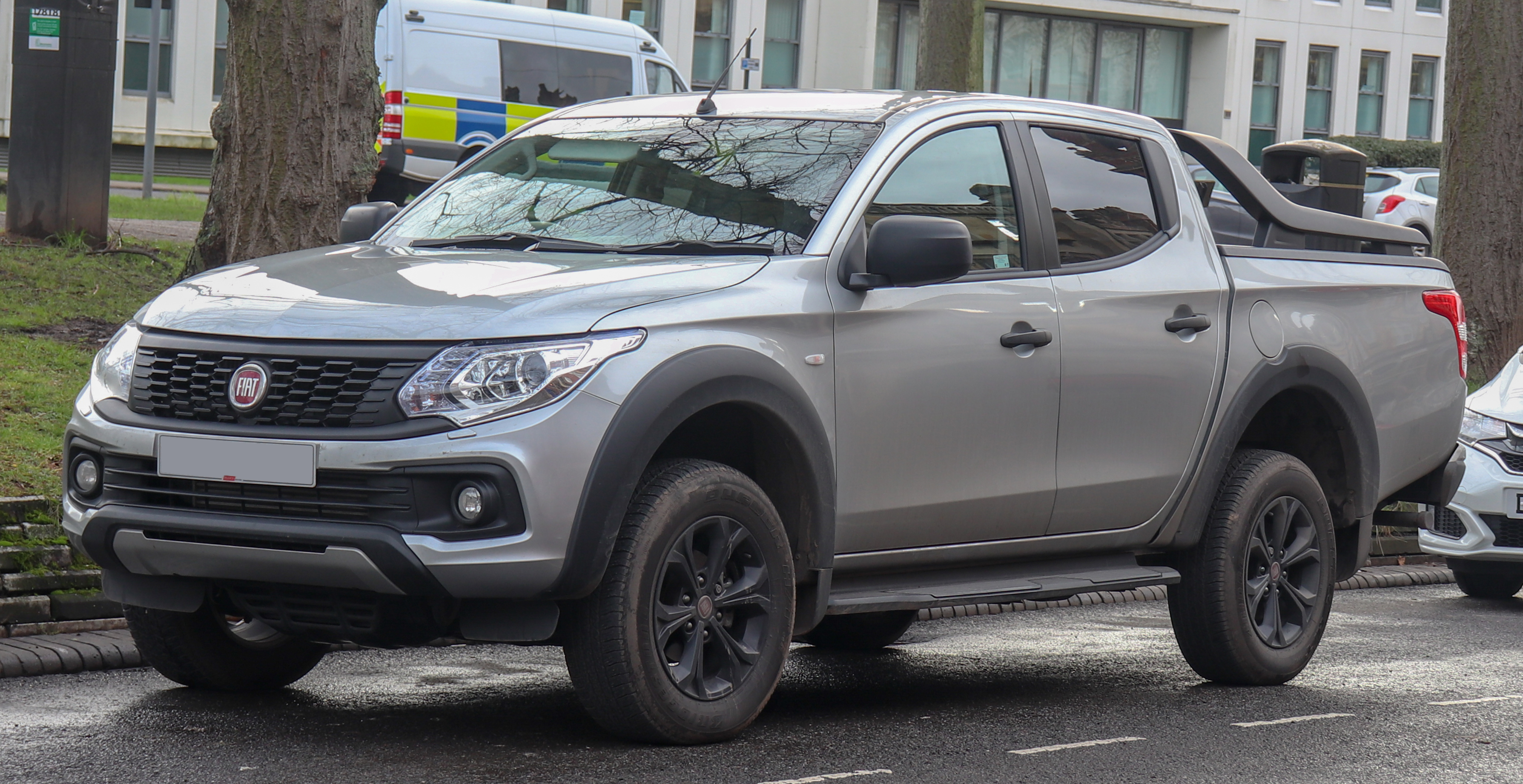
Fiat Fullback Cross

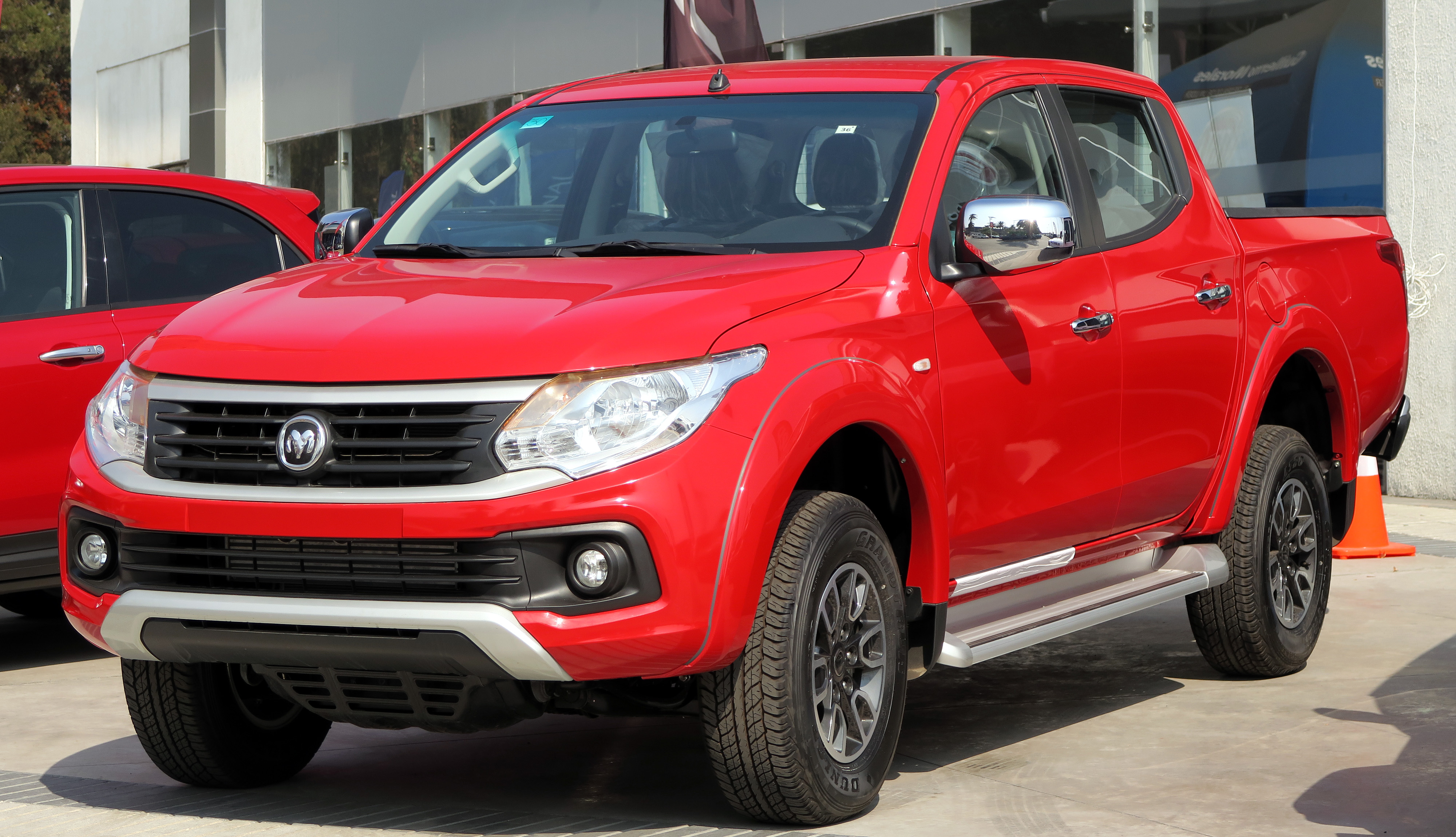
Ram 1200

== Specifications ==
Model	2.4	2.4
Construction period	since 06/2016	
Number of cylinders	4	
Displacement (cm³)	2442	
Max. power (kW/PS)	113/154 @ 3500	133/181 @ 3500
Max. torque (Nm)	380 @ 1500–2500	430 @ 2500
Drive	rear wheel drive or optional all wheel drive	
Transmission	6-speed manual	
Transmission (optional)	—	5-speed automatic
Top speed (km/h)	169	179 [177]*
Acceleration (0-100 km/h)	12,2 s	10,2 s
Combined consumption (l/100 km)	6,9 D	6,4 D [7,2 D]*
Fuel capacity	75	
Emission standard	Euro 6	

* * Information in brackets for automatic version
