= List of VM Motori engines =

Italian manufacturer VM Motori has designed and built several different diesel engines for many third-party applications. Since 2013 Fiat and its successors own VM Motori and sell projects to automotive manufacturers including GM, Jeep, and other companies. VM Motori offers different range of engines depending on the applications: automotive, industrial, marine, and power generation.

== Automotive applications ==
=== 3 Cylinder ===
==== R 315 SOHC ====
1.5 L (1,493 cc; 91.1 cu in) I3, with a single overhead camshaft, four valves-per-cylinder, and common-rail direct fuel injection.

This engine was designed in 1998 with the related 4-cylinder variant R 420 SOHC. In 1999, VM granted Hyundai the license to manufacture both engines. Under terms of the agreement, Hyundai was able to manufacture the engines only to power its vehicles, while VM was free to grant other license agreements also in Korea, as happened in 2004 with GM Daewoo.

Further evolutions were named RA 315 (Euro 4 compliant, up to 105 PS (77 kW; 104 hp) ) and A 315 (Euro 5 compliant, up to 115 PS (85 kW; 113 hp) ).

Applications:

- Hyundai Accent (power: 90 hp (67 kW); torque: 133 lb⋅ft (180 N⋅m))
- Hyundai Matrix (power: 90 hp (67 kW); torque: 133 lb⋅ft (180 N⋅m))
- Hyundai Getz (power: 90 hp (67 kW); torque: 133 lb⋅ft (180 N⋅m))

==== HR 392 SOHC ====
92 mm × 89.2 mm (3.62 in × 3.51 in) bore and stroke, 1.8 L (1,779 cc; 108.6 cu in) straight-three engine, of an OHV pushrod design with two valves per cylinder. The block was cast iron, with an alloy head. It featured a four main bearing crankshaft, a balance shaft, and a Bosch VE3/10 fuel injection pump. A KKK 14 turbocharger was used, with an intercooler for the facelifted 'Nuova 33' of 1990. Although out of production, this was the biggest three-cylinder engine ever made for a car.

Applications:

- 1986–1989 Alfa Romeo 33 Series II 73 PS (54 kW) at 4,200 rpm and 178 N⋅m (131 lb⋅ft) at 2,400 rpm
- 1990.01–1995 Alfa Romeo 33 Series III 84 PS (62 kW) at 4,200 rpm and 178 N⋅m (131 lb⋅ft) at 2,400 rpm

==== RA 325 ====
1.5 L (1,493 cc) 82 hp (61 kW) at 4000 rpm 187–191 N⋅m (138–141 lb⋅ft) 1900–2700 rpm.

- Hyundai Matrix
- Hyundai Getz
- Hyundai Accent

=== 4 Cylinder ===
==== RA 420 SOHC ====
2.0 L (1,991 cc; 121.5 cu in) straight-4, with four valves-per-cylinder and common-rail direct fuel injection. Produced by GM Korea and Hyundai Group (Hyundai and Kia).

Applications:

- Chevrolet Cruze, power: 110 kW (150 PS), torque: 320 N⋅m (236 lb⋅ft)
- Daewoo Lacetti/Daewoo Nubira II/Chevrolet Optra, power: 89 kW (121 PS), torque: 280 N⋅m (207 lb⋅ft)
- Daewoo Tosca/Chevrolet Epica, power: 110 kW (150 PS), torque: 320 N⋅m (236 lb⋅ft)
- Daewoo Winstorm/Chevrolet Captiva, power: 110 kW (150 PS), torque: 320 N⋅m (236 lb⋅ft), engine code: Z 20 S1.
- Hyundai Elantra XD, power: 82 kW (111 PS); torque: 250 N⋅m (180 lb⋅ft)
- Hyundai i30 FD, power: 103 kW (140 PS); torque: 305 N⋅m (225 lb⋅ft) (pre-facelift models)
- Hyundai Sonata NF, power: 103 kW (140 PS) (pre-facelift models) / 110 kW (150 PS) (facelift models); torque: 305 N⋅m (225 lb⋅ft)
- Hyundai Tucson JM, power: 82 kW (111 PS), 103 kW (140 PS) or 110 kW (150 PS) depending on model year; torque: 250 N⋅m (180 lb⋅ft) or 305 N⋅m (225 lb⋅ft)
- Hyundai Santa Fe SM, power: 82 kW (111 PS); torque: 250 N⋅m (180 lb⋅ft)
- Hyundai Santa Fe CM, power: 103 kW (140 PS) or 110 kW (150 PS); torque: 305 N⋅m (225 lb⋅ft)
- Hyundai Trajet, power: 82 kW (111 PS); torque: 250 N⋅m (180 lb⋅ft)
- Kia Cerato/Spectra LD, power: 82 kW (111 PS); torque: 250 N⋅m (180 lb⋅ft)
- Kia cee'd ED, power: 103 kW (140 PS); torque: 305 N⋅m (225 lb⋅ft)
- Kia Optima/Magentis MG, power: 103 kW (140 PS) (pre-facelift models) / 88 kW (120 PS), or 100 kW (136 PS) or 110 kW (150 PS) (facelift models); torque: 305 N⋅m (225 lb⋅ft)
- Kia Carens FC, power: 82 kW (111 PS); torque: 250 N⋅m (180 lb⋅ft)
- Kia Carens UN, power: 103 kW (140 PS); torque: 305 N⋅m (225 lb⋅ft)
- Kia Sportage JE, power 82 kW (111 PS), 103 kW (140 PS) or 110 kW (150 PS) depending on model year; torque: 250 N⋅m (180 lb⋅ft) or 305 N⋅m (225 lb⋅ft)
- Opel Antara, power: 110 kW (150 PS), torque: 320 N⋅m (236 lb⋅ft) - called Z20DM/DMH by Opel

==== HR 488 OHV ====
2.0 L (1,995 cc; 121.7 cu in) straight-4, with two pushrod-actuated valves-per-cylinder and indirect injection from Bosch (Spica in earlier versions). 88 mm × 82 mm (3.5 in × 3.2 in). This engine, developed for Alfa Romeo in 1979, is also known as the VM80A and VM4 HT. Usually with KKK 16 turbochargers.

Applications:

- 1985.05–1992.02 Alfa Romeo 75, 95 PS (70 kW) at 4,300 rpm and 192 N⋅m (142 lb⋅ft) at 2,300 rpm
- 1979.10–1984.12 Alfa Romeo Alfetta, 82 PS (60 kW) at 4,300 rpm and 162 N⋅m (119 lb⋅ft) at 2,300 rpm
- 1983.03–1985.05 Alfa Romeo Giulietta, 82 PS (60 kW) at 4,300 rpm and 162 N⋅m (119 lb⋅ft) at 2,300 rpm
- 1984 FSO Polonez, 84 PS (62 kW) at 4,300 rpm and 162 N⋅m (119 lb⋅ft) at 2,500 rpm

==== HR 492 OHV ====
2.4 L (2,393 cc; 146.0 cu in) straight-4, with two pushrod-actuated valves-per-cylinder and indirect fuel injection (Bosch VE 4/10, Spica in some earlier applications). 92 mm × 90 mm (3.62 in × 3.54 in). This engine is also known as the VM81A and VM4 HT 2.4. At first the 2.4 used KKK 24 turbochargers, later KKK 16s were installed for higher output.

Applications:

- 1988.10–1992.02 Alfa Romeo 75, 112 PS (82 kW) at 4,200 rpm and 240 N⋅m (177 lb⋅ft) at 2,400 rpm
- 1984.10–1987.01 Alfa Romeo 90, 110 PS (81 kW) at 4,200 rpm and 235 N⋅m (173 lb⋅ft) at 2,300 rpm
- 1983.04–1984.12 Alfa Romeo Alfetta, 95 PS (70 kW) at 4,200 rpm and 186 N⋅m (137 lb⋅ft) at 2,400 rpm
- 1984 Delta Mini Cruiser/Explorer, 100 PS (74 kW) at 4,200 rpm
- 1986–1989.10 Range Rover, 106 PS (78 kW) at 4,200 rpm and 238 N⋅m (176 lb⋅ft) at 2,400 rpm
- 1982.04–1986.10 Rover 2400 SD Turbo (SD1), 67 kW (91 PS; 90 bhp) at 4,000 rpm and 192 N⋅m (142 lb⋅ft) at 2,350 rpm
- 1986–? UAZ 469B, 97 PS (71 kW) at 4,200 rpm and 216 N⋅m (159 lb⋅ft) at 2,300 rpm (installed for the Italian market by importer V. Martorelli)

==== 425 OHV ====
2.5 L (2,499 cc; 152.5 cu in) straight-four, with two pushrod-actuated valves-per-cylinder and indirect fuel injection. 92 mm × 94 mm (3.62 in × 3.70 in), the engine size is variably referred to as either 2,500 or 2,499 cc. This engine too has been called HR 492, signifying four cylinders of 92 mm (3.62 in) bore. Timing gears, not belt.

Applications:

- 1994–1998 Alfa Romeo 155, 125 PS (92 kW) at 4,200 rpm and 294 N⋅m (217 lb⋅ft) at 2,000 rpm
- 1987–1992 Alfa Romeo 164, 114–117 PS (84–86 kW) at 4,200 rpm and 258 N⋅m (190 lb⋅ft) at 2,500 rpm (HR492/VM84A/VM08)
- 1992–1998 Alfa Romeo 164, 125 PS (92 kW) at 4,200 rpm and 294 N⋅m (217 lb⋅ft) at 2,000 rpm (HS492/VM32)
- 1991–2000 Chrysler Voyager, 118 PS (87 kW) and 262 N⋅m (193 lb⋅ft)
- 1999–2001 Dodge Dakota (Brazil), 114 hp (85 kW; 116 PS) and 300 N⋅m (221 lb⋅ft)
- 1991–1995 Dodge Caravan C/V (U.S. fleets only), 118 PS (87 kW) and 262 N⋅m (193 lb⋅ft)
- 1993–1999 Ford Scorpio
- 1996–2000 GAZ GAZelle, 101 hp (75 kW; 102 PS); torque: 232 N⋅m (171 lb⋅ft)
- 1994–2001 Jeep Cherokee, 118 hp (88 kW; 120 PS) at 4,000 rpm and 300 N⋅m (221 lb⋅ft) at 2,000 rpm
- 1995–1998 Jeep Grand Cherokee, 114 hp (85 kW; 116 PS) and 300 N⋅m (221 lb⋅ft)
- 1989.10–1992 Range Rover, 121 PS (89 kW; 119 bhp) at 4,200 rpm and 284 N⋅m (209 lb⋅ft) at 1,950 rpm
- 1990–1999 Rover 800, 118 bhp (88 kW; 120 PS), latterly 120 bhp (89 kW; 122 PS) and 268 N⋅m (198 lb⋅ft) at 2,100 rpm
- 1997–2000 UAZ 3160, 101 hp (75 kW; 102 PS) and 232 N⋅m (171 lb⋅ft)
- 1995 V.M.C 2500 Turbotronic, 117 PS (86 kW) at 4,200 rpm and 235 N⋅m (173 lb⋅ft) at 2,200 rpm

This engine was also used in some early Toyota Land Cruisers & Hilux, and Opel Fronteras.

The 425 OHV used in Chrysler Voyager 1991–2000 only 1996 and 1997 was with chain.

Between 1997 and 2001 this engine was manufactured at "Detroit Diesel Motores do Brasil" in Curitiba, Paraná, Brazil. The plant was eventually sold to Perkins after the Dodge Dakota stopped production locally.

==== R 425 OHV ====
425 OHV fitted with direct fuel injection for cleaner emissions.

Applications: Rover 800 late models circa 1998

==== R 425 DOHC ====
2.5 L (2,499 cc; 152.5 cu in) straight-4, with four valves-per-cylinder and common-rail direct fuel injection. Also available with variable geometry turbocharger (VGT) with upgraded power output of 163 PS (120 kW; 161 hp).

Applications:

- 2001–2007 Chrysler Voyager Manual power: 141 hp (105 kW; 143 PS); torque: 340 N⋅m (251 lb⋅ft)
- 2002–2004 Jeep Liberty power: 141 hp (105 kW; 143 PS); torque: 340 N⋅m (251 lb⋅ft)
- 2005–2009 LDV Maxus
- 2011–present SAIC Maxus V80

power: 118 hp (88 kW; 120 PS) at 4,000 rpm; torque: 300 N⋅m (221 lb⋅ft) at 2,000 rpm

- 2012 Zhongxing Landmark
- 2016–present, Zhongxing Terralord
- 2012–2020, Holden Colorado, Chevrolet Colorado
  - power: 163 PS (120 kW; 161 hp); Torque: 380 N⋅m (280 lb⋅ft) Duramax LKH (Thai production)
  - power: 180 PS (132 kW; 178 hp); Torque: 439 N⋅m (324 lb⋅ft) Duramax XLDE25 LP2 (Thai production)

A derated version of this engine putting out 100 hp (75 kW; 101 PS) was chosen in 2006 to power the new generation of the iconic London Taxi (the TX4).

==== R 428 DOHC (ENR) ====
R 425 DOHC enlarged to 2.8 L (2,766 cc; 168.8 cu in) displacement.

Applications:

- 2001–2007 Chrysler Voyager (Automatic transmission) power: 150 hp (112 kW; 152 PS); torque: 360 N⋅m (266 lb⋅ft)
- 2001–2004 Jeep Cherokee/Liberty power: 150 hp (112 kW; 152 PS); torque: 360 N⋅m (266 lb⋅ft). Only in Europe. (JEEP engine code: ENR)
- 2005–2006 Jeep Liberty power: 160 hp (119 kW; 162 PS); torque: 400 N⋅m (295 lb⋅ft)
- 2004–present BMC Megastar power: 127 hp (95 kW; 129 PS); torque: 250 N⋅m (184 lb⋅ft)

==== RA 428 DOHC ====
Evolution of R 428 DOHC. Base design for SDEC SC28R engine.

Applications:

- 2008–2010 Jeep Liberty power: 177 PS (130 kW; 175 hp); torque: 410–460 N⋅m (302–339 lb⋅ft)
- 2007–2010 Dodge Nitro power: 177 PS (130 kW; 175 hp); torque: 410–460 N⋅m (302–339 lb⋅ft)
- 2007–2010 Jeep Wrangler power: 177 PS (130 kW; 175 hp); torque: Manual transmission: 410 N⋅m (302 lb⋅ft) automatic transmission: 460 N⋅m (339 lb⋅ft)
- 2008–2011 Chrysler Grand Voyager (Automatic transmission) power: 163 PS (120 kW; 161 hp); torque: 400 N⋅m (295 lb⋅ft)
- 2016–present Maxus/LDV T60 (SC28R engine) (Automatic & Manual transmission) power: 150 PS (110 kW; 148 hp); torque: 360 N⋅m (266 lb⋅ft)

==== A 428 DOHC ====
Evolution of R428 DOHC with 1,800 bar (26,000 psi) common rail injection system and piezoelectric injectors

Applications:

- 2010–2012 Jeep Cherokee power: 200 PS (147 kW; 197 hp); torque: Manual transmission: 410 N⋅m (302 lb⋅ft) automatic transmission: 460 N⋅m (339 lb⋅ft)
- 2010–2018 Jeep Wrangler power: 200 PS (147 kW; 197 hp); torque: Manual transmission: 410 N⋅m (302 lb⋅ft) automatic transmission: 460 N⋅m (339 lb⋅ft)
- 2011–2013 Chrysler Grand Voyager/Lancia Voyager power: 163 PS (120 kW; 161 hp); torque: 360 N⋅m (266 lb⋅ft)
- 2013–2016 Chrysler Grand Voyager/Lancia Voyager power: 178 PS (131 kW; 176 hp); torque: 360 N⋅m (266 lb⋅ft)
- 2013 Holden Colorado, Holden Colorado 7 power 180 PS (132 kW; 178 hp); 470 N⋅m (347 lb⋅ft) (Updated November 2013)
- 2014–2022, Holden Colorado, Chevrolet Colorado/GMC Canyon power: 200 PS (147 kW; 197 hp) Torque: 500 N⋅m (369 lb⋅ft)
- 2017–2022, Chevrolet Express 2500 & 3500 vans. Power: 181 hp (135 kW) at 3,400rpm and 369 lb⋅ft (500 N⋅m) at 2,000 rpm

==== R 754 ====
The R 754 is a 3.0 L (2,970 cc; 181.2 cu in) double overhead camshaft inline-four engine, featuring common-rail direct fuel injection and a fixed-geometry turbocharger. The bore and stroke are 94 mm × 107 mm (3.70 in × 4.21 in). It produces between 82 and 115 hp (60 and 85 kW). Fitted with an oxidation catalyst, particulate filter, and selective catalytic reduction, it meets the Euro 6 emissions standards and Stage V for off-road use.

Applications:

Schmidt Swingo 200+ (street sweeper)

Aebi TT241 / TT281 (Terratrac / Slope tractor)

Aebi TP420 (Multipurpose Transporter)

Aebi VT450 (Vario Transporter)

=== 5 Cylinder ===
==== HR 588 OHV ====
2.5 L (2,494 cc; 152.2 cu in) inline-5, with two pushrod-actuated valves-per-cylinder and indirect fuel injection from either Bosch or Spica. 88 mm × 82 mm (3.46 in × 3.23 in). This engine is a five-cylinder version of the 2-litre HR488, and also uses KKK turbochargers.

Applications:

- 1983–1986.05 Alfa Romeo Alfa 6, 112 PS (82 kW) at 4,200 rpm and 240 N⋅m (177 lb⋅ft) at 2,400 rpm
- 1987–? Toyota Land Cruiser II BJ73, 99 PS (73 kW) at 4,000 rpm and 220 N⋅m (162 lb⋅ft) at 2,600 rpm (Italian market only) (European market)

==== 531 OHV ====
Essentially a 425 OHV with an extra cylinder. 3.1 L (3,125 cc; 190.7 cu in) Straight-5, with two pushrod-actuated valves-per-cylinder and indirect fuel injection.

Applications:

- 1999–2001 Jeep Grand Cherokee power: 140 hp (104 kW; 142 PS); torque: 384 N⋅m (283 lb⋅ft)

==== R 531 OHV ====
531 OHV I5 engine, fitted with direct fuel injection.

Applications:

=== 6 Cylinder ===
==== 638 OHV ====
Essentially a 531 OHV with an extra cylinder. 3.7 L (3,749 cc; 228.8 cu in) inline-six, with two pushrod-actuated valves-per-cylinder and indirect fuel injection.

Applications:

- 1995–1999 Asia Motors Combi power: 135 hp (101 kW; 137 PS); torque: 320 N⋅m (236 lb⋅ft)
- 1995–2000 Bucher-Guyer Duro power: 148 hp (110 kW; 150 PS); torque: 340 N⋅m (251 lb⋅ft)
- 1999 Bering trucks power: 116 hp (87 kW; 118 PS); torque: 400 N⋅m (295 lb⋅ft)

Also used by BMW Marine as a 180 hp (134 kW; 182 PS) stern-drive package.

==== R 638 OHV ====
638 OHV fitted with direct fuel injection.

Applications:

==== D 642 OHV ====
Essentially an R 638 OHV enlarged to 4.2 L (4,164 cc; 254.1 cu in) displacement. It was the first VM Motori engine to feature direct fuel injection.

Applications:

- 2001–2002 Bucher-Guyer Duro power: 158 hp (118 kW; 160 PS); torque: 400 N⋅m (295 lb⋅ft)

==== RA 629 DOHC ====
A planned 2.9 L (2,935 cc; 179.1 cu in) double overhead camshaft V6 engine, featuring four valves-per-cylinder and common-rail direct fuel injection.

Developed for General Motors but stopped at the end of 2008; after Cadillac left the European market and Saab was put for sale, GM had no use for that engine.

===== RA629 (A29DT) applications (Europe) =====
- 2010 Saab 9-5 Branded as TID^{6} (only one known test vehicle exists)
  - power 250 PS (184 kW; 247 hp), torque 550 N⋅m (406 lb⋅ft)

==== A 630 DOHC ====
630 DOHC

Overview
- Manufacturer: VM Motori
- Also called: A630, EcoDiesel, L630
- Production: 2011–2023

Layout
- Configuration: 60° V6
- Displacement: 3.0 L; 182.3 cu in (2,987 cc)
- Cylinder bore: 83 mm (3.27 in)
- Piston stroke: 92 mm (3.62 in)
- Cylinder block material: Compacted graphite iron
- Cylinder head material: Aluminum
- Valvetrain: DOHC 4 valves × cyl.
- Compression ratio: 15.5:1

Combustion
- Turbocharger: Honeywell VGT 2056
- Fuel system: Common rail direct injection
- Fuel type: Diesel, B20
- Oil system: Wet sump
- Cooling system: Water-cooled

Output
- Power output: 190–275 PS (140–202 kW; 187–271 hp)
- Torque output: 440–600 N⋅m (325–443 lb⋅ft)

Dimensions
- Length: 695 mm (27.4 in)
- Width: 729 mm (28.7 in)
- Height: 697.5 mm (27.46 in)
- Dry weight: 220 kg (485 lb)

Chronology
- Predecessor: Mercedes-Benz OM642 (Chrysler applications)

A 3.0 L (2,987 cc; 182.3 cu in) double overhead camshaft V6 engine, featuring four valves-per-cylinder and common-rail direct fuel injection. A variant complying with the emission norms of the North America market (NAFTA) is the L630 DOHC and marketed by Fiat Chrysler as the EcoDiesel. The high-performance, single turbo version is codenamed as A630 DOHC HP.

===== A630 applications (Europe) =====
- 2011 Jeep Grand Cherokee (Also Australia)
  - power 241 PS (177 kW; 238 hp), torque 550 N⋅m (406 lb⋅ft)
- 2012 Chrysler 300 /Lancia Thema (Europe)
  - power 190 PS (140 kW; 187 hp) at 4000 rpm, torque 440 N⋅m (325 lb⋅ft) at 1600–2800 rpm
  - power 239 PS (176 kW; 236 hp) at 4000 rpm, torque 550 N⋅m (406 lb⋅ft) at 1800–2800 rpm
- 2014 Jeep Grand Cherokee (FPT Multijet II)
  - power 250 PS (184 kW; 247 hp) at 4000 rpm, torque 570 N⋅m (420 lb⋅ft) at 2000 rpm

===== L630 applications (North America) =====
- 2021–2023 Jeep Gladiator Branded as EcoDiesel
  - power 264 PS (194 kW; 260 hp) at 3600 rpm, torque 600 N⋅m (443 lb⋅ft) at 2000 rpm
- 2014–2019 Jeep Grand Cherokee Branded as EcoDiesel
  - power 243 PS (179 kW; 240 hp) at 3600 rpm, torque 570 N⋅m (420 lb⋅ft) at 2000 rpm
- 2020–2023 Jeep Wrangler Branded as EcoDiesel
  - power 264 PS (194 kW; 260 hp) at 3600 rpm, torque 600 N⋅m (443 lb⋅ft) at 2000 rpm
- 2014–2018 Ram 1500 Branded as EcoDiesel
  - power 243 PS (179 kW; 240 hp) at 3600 rpm, torque 570 N⋅m (420 lb⋅ft) at 2000 rpm
- 2019–2023 Ram 1500 Branded as EcoDiesel
  - power 264 PS (194 kW; 260 hp) at 3600 rpm, torque 650 N⋅m (479 lb⋅ft) at 2000 rpm

===== A630 HP applications (Europe) =====
- 2013 Maserati Ghibli III
  - power 275 PS (202 kW; 271 hp) at 4000 rpm, torque 600 N⋅m (443 lb⋅ft) at 2000 rpm
- 2013 Maserati Quattroporte VI
  - power 275 PS (202 kW; 271 hp) at 4000 rpm, torque 600 N⋅m (443 lb⋅ft) at 2000–2600 rpm
- 2016 Maserati Levante
  - power 250 PS (184 kW; 247 hp) at 4000 rpm, torque 600 N⋅m (443 lb⋅ft) at 2000–2600 rpm
  - power 275 PS (202 kW; 271 hp) at 4000 rpm, torque 600 N⋅m (443 lb⋅ft) at 2000–2600 rpm

== See also ==
- List of Chrysler engines

=== Other vehicles which used VM Motori engines in some models ===
- AMC Eagle
- ARO 24 Series
- Chevrolet Colorado Diesel only.
- Ford Scorpio
- Fiat Croma
- Isuzu D-Max
- Jeep Wrangler
- Opel Frontera
- Range Rover Turbo D
- Toyota Hilux (2.4D)
- Toyota Land Cruiser
- VW Taro (2.4D)
