= Ram 1500 TRX =

Off-road truck produced by Ram Trucks

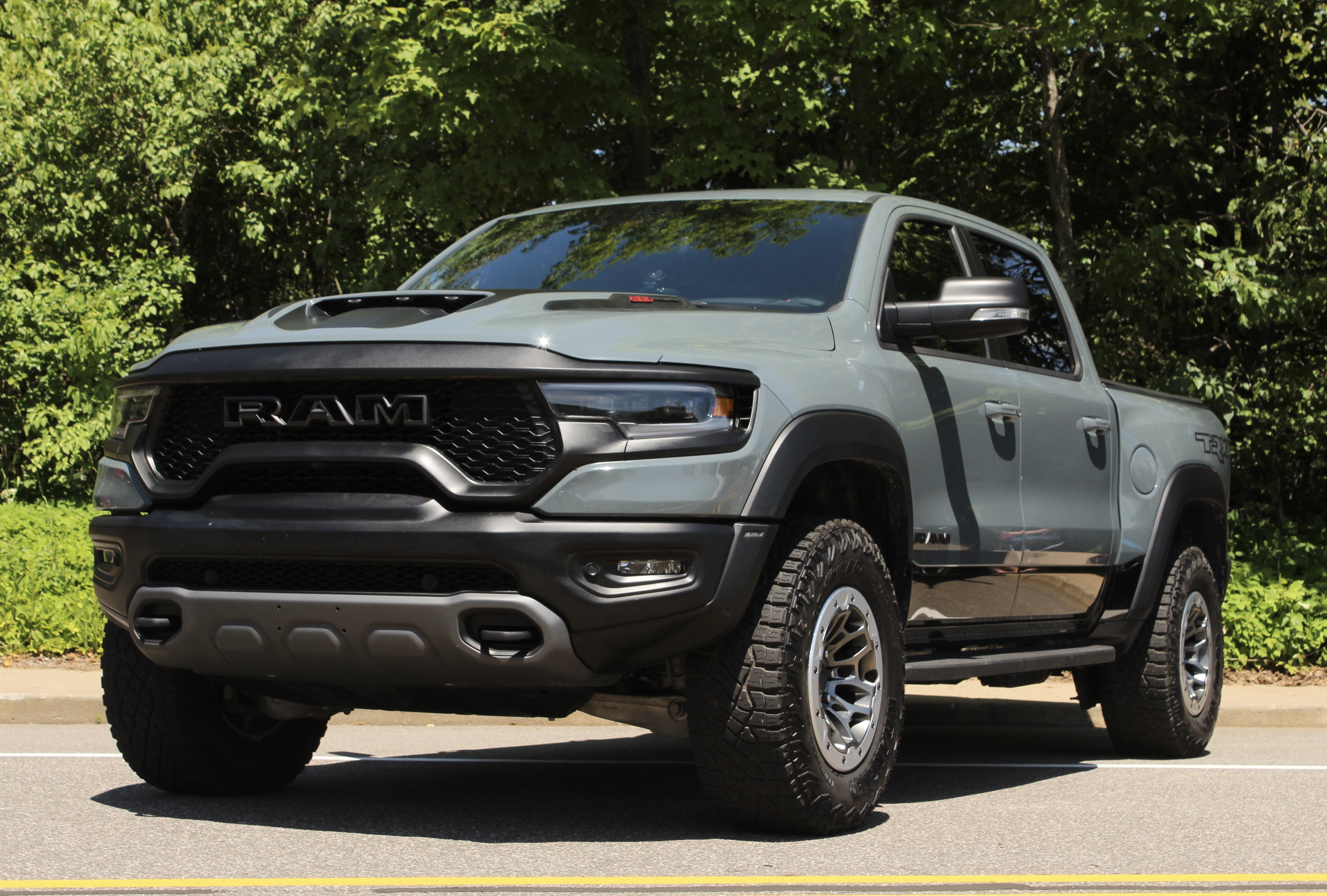
- 2021 Ram 1500 TRX

Overview
- Manufacturer: Ram Trucks (Stellantis)
- Also called: Ram Rebel TRX (prototype); Ram 1500 SRT TRX (2027–present)
- Production: December 2020 – February 2024; January 2026 – present
- Model years: 2021–2024; 2027–present
- Assembly: United States: Sterling Heights, Michigan (Sterling Heights Assembly)
- Designer: Mike Gilliam

Body and chassis
- Class: Full-size pickup truck
- Body style: 4-door crew cab
- Layout: Front-engine, four-wheel-drive
- Related: Ram 1500 (DT); Ram 1500 REV; Ram Heavy Duty; Jeep Wagoneer/Grand Wagoneer (WS)

Powertrain
- Engine: Gasoline: 6.2 L Hemi supercharged V8
- Transmission: 8-speed ZF 8HP95 automatic

Dimensions
- Wheelbase: 145.1 in (3,686 mm)
- Length: 232.9 in (5,916 mm)
- Width: 88 in (2,235 mm)
- Height: 80.9 in (2,055 mm)
- Curb weight: 6,350 lb (2,880 kg)

The Ram 1500 TRX is a high-performance variant of the fifth-generation Ram 1500 (DT) full-size pickup truck, produced by the Ram Trucks division of Stellantis. The TRX name was based on the Ram Rebel TRX concept that was shown at the 2016 State Fair of Texas as an engineering, design and consumer-interest study. Following consumer feedback, the company announced on June 1, 2018, that it would place the truck into production for the 2021 model year.

The original 702 HP TRX was produced during the 2021 through 2024 model years. It was discontinued after the 2024 model year because it couldn't be modified to meet tougher automotive emissions standards, and the company's shift towards electrification, involving the eventual discontinuation of the 6.2L, 6.4L (except for the Ram HD trucks) and 5.7L Hemi engines altogether, being replaced by the 3.0L Hurricane engine. The last special edition TRX was the Ram 1500 TRX Final Edition. The last Ram 1500 TRX was produced on February 16th 2024.

A similar truck, the Ram 1500 RHO was introduced, but it is not a direct successor to the TRX because it uses a different and less powerful engine, the Hurricane. The model year was cut short because of RAM launching 2025 trucks 7 months earlier than their usual model year release date. However, in late July 2025, Stellantis CEO Antonio Filosa has officially confirmed that the TRX will be returning for the 2026 model year. The Ram 1500 TRX has returned on January 1, 2026 as a 2027 model, with a redesign and a horsepower upgrade to 777 hp (579 kW; 788 PS).

The TRX competes with the Ford Raptor family of high-performance pickup trucks.

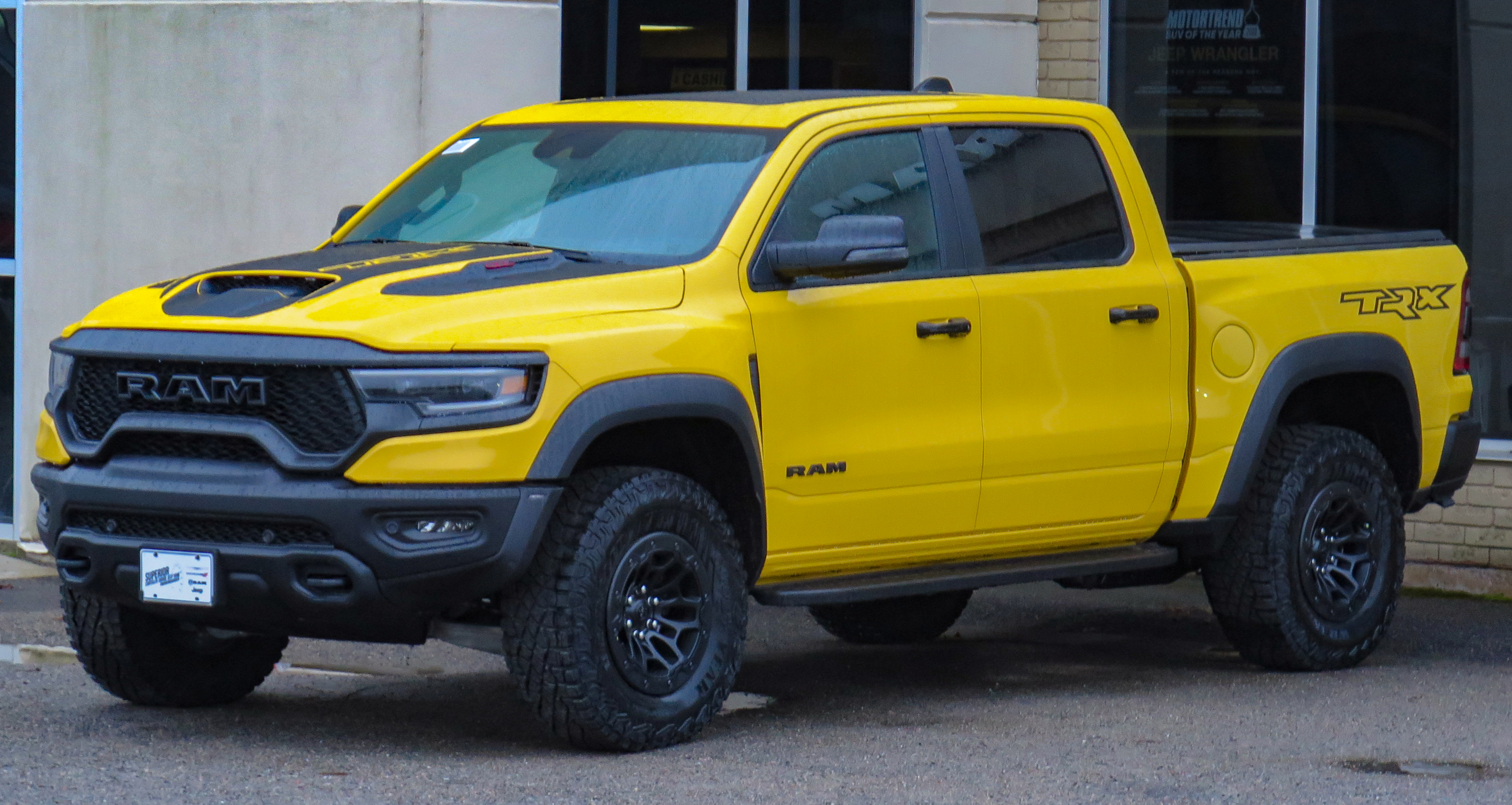
Ram 1500 TRX Havoc Edition

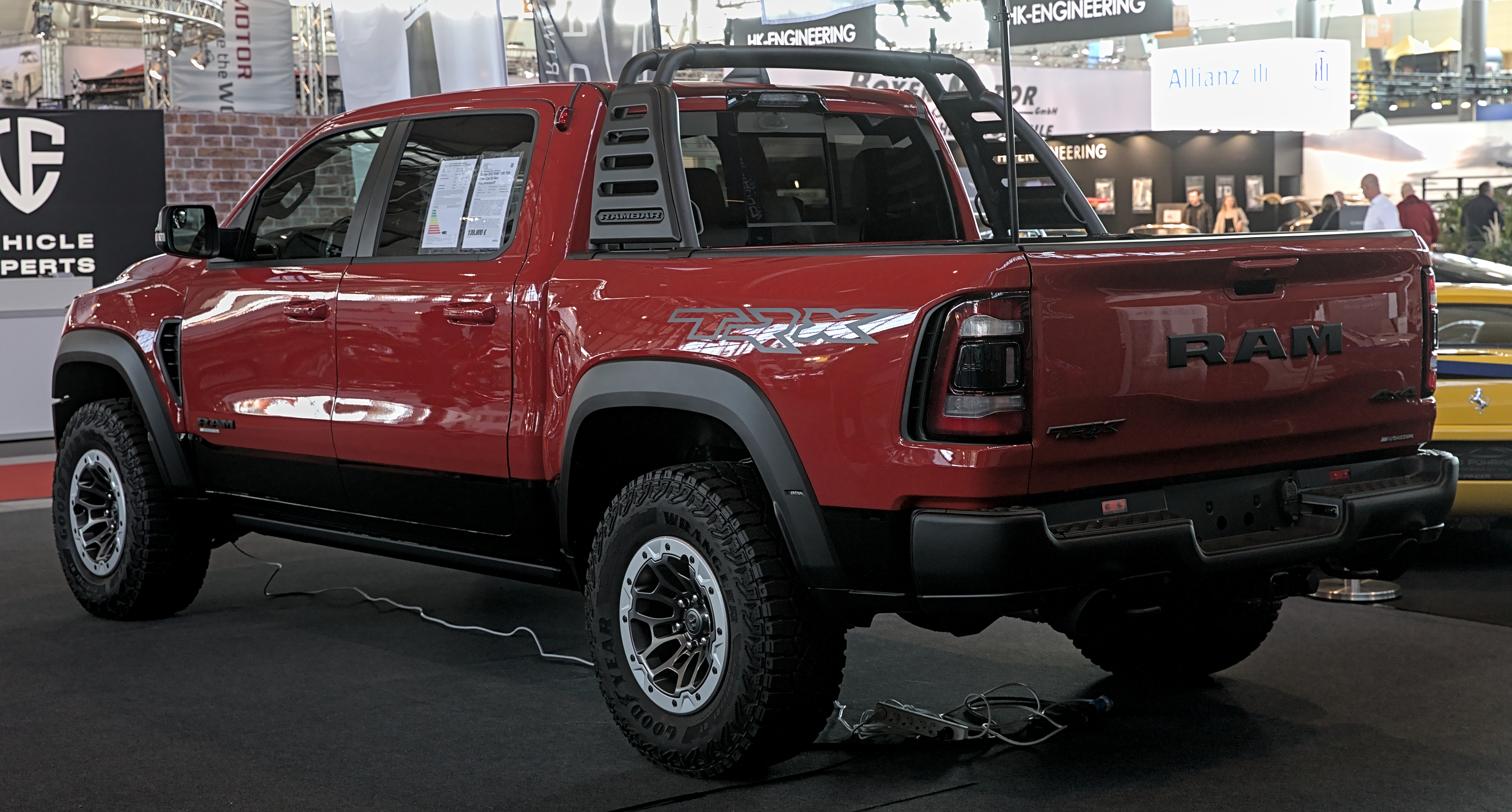
Ram 1500 TRX rear

== Ram Rebel TRX concept ==
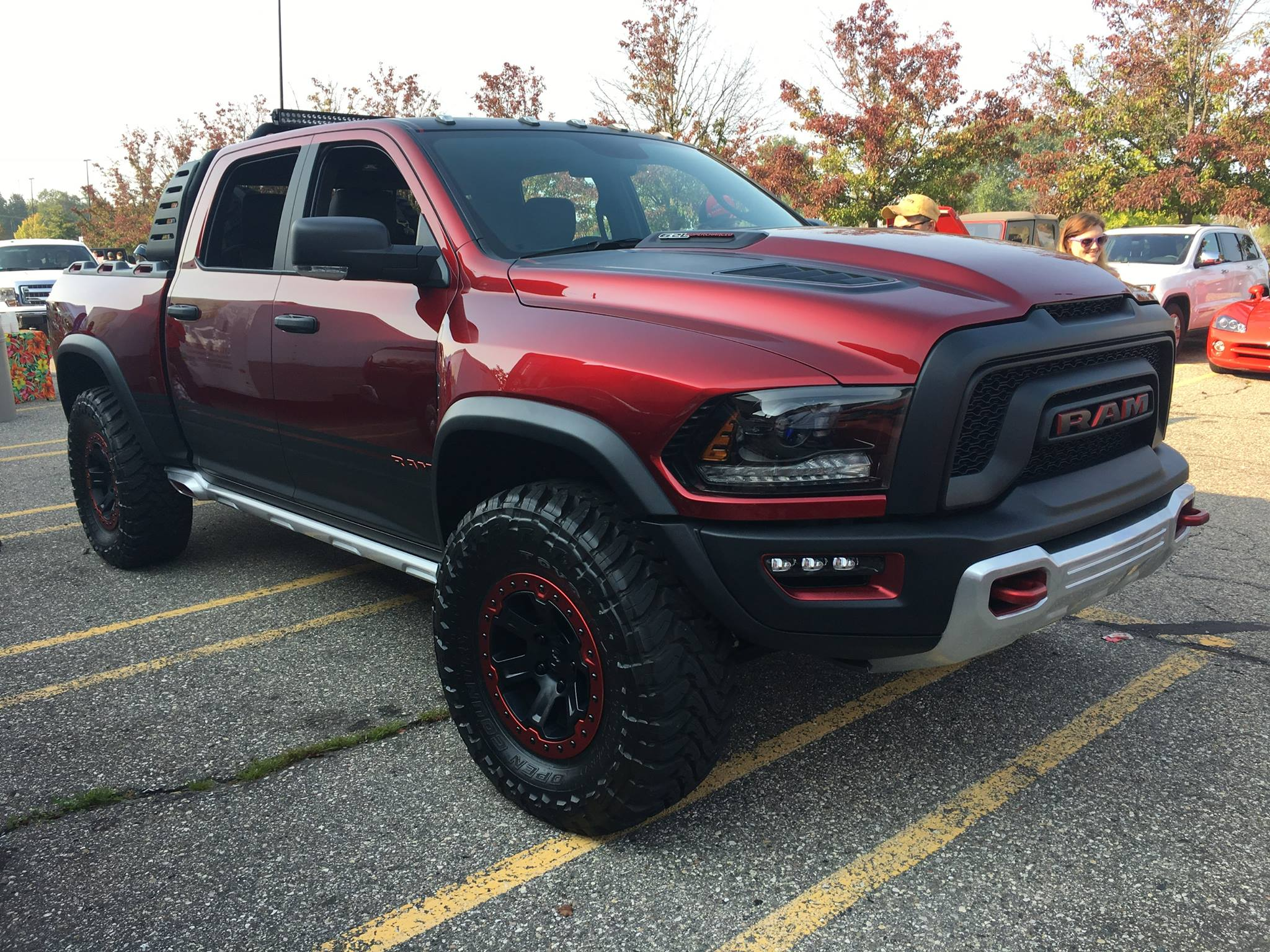
Ram Rebel TRX concept

The non-production modifications of the concept prototype include 37-inch tires mounted on Mopar 18-inch bead-lock wheels featuring body color matched rings, two full size spare wheels and tires in a bed mount configuration also featuring a lockable unit housing a jack, tow strap, and room for more tools. Other production departures include a six inch wider track with extended fenders to cover the wider wheel base, giving the truck an hourglass look when viewed from above, LED clearance lights, a tire rack mounted LED light bar, five inch side exhaust integrated into protective rock rails, skid plates, a 6.2-liter supercharged HEMI V8 engine based on the popular Hellcat featured in Dodge Chargers, Challengers, and the Jeep Grand Cherokee Trackhawk, but detuned for the truck application to 575 horsepower mated to a TorqueFlite 8HP70 transmission and a BorgWarner 44-45 transfer case. The drivetrain features four modes from which to choose: Normal, Wet/Snow, Off-road and Baja. The rear axle is a Dynatrac Pro 60 and the vehicle also features an electronic axle locker available in all modes. The modified suspension is built onto a stock "DS" Series Ram platform 1500 frame. The link coil based suspension is upgraded with performance springs, 2.5-inch King Racing Shocks and feature a 40% increase in travel to 13" front and rear from the standard 9".

The interior also features multiple deviations from the stock Ram Rebel 1500 including faux suede inserts in the seats, "sport-sanctioned lateral support upper bolsters with embroidered logos", six point harnesses, cloth door pulls, a console shifter, a rotary selector for the various drive modes, an anodized steering wheel with accent stitching, paddle shifters, a tool bag featuring TRX labeling, carbon fiber and red metal inlays, a camera mount near the rearview mirror, and a sport bar to which the six point harnesses mount. The concept also features a non-production shade of "Header Red" that was applied in thirty different coats.

=== Reception ===
After the unveiling of the concept at the 2016 Texas State Fair, multiple online media published positive reactions:

"For now, all we can do is dream about owning one of these beasts as it is still just a concept vehicle."

"Ram should use this golden opportunity to put an insane, over-powered off-roading truck into production, because it will surely sell quickly, is relatively easy to build, and would be in a segment that only has one other competitor . . . It's time for Ram to build the TRX."

"Back in the day, Dodge put a Viper engine in a Ram pickup truck . . . since those glory days, there hasn’t been a true high performance truck from the car company with horns. That needs to change, and now is the time."

== Production history ==
In February 2018, Jared Belfour, citing unnamed sources, reported that two Ram Rebel models based on the Ram Rebel TRX concept will be produced. A base version featuring a new version of the naturally aspirated 426 cubic inch (7.0L) HEMI engine and the optional supercharged 6.2L HEMI engine as well as a 2021 release date.

Later that same year in April, also citing unnamed sources, 5th Gen Rams reported that the two engine options will be associated with different names where the "Ram Rebel TR" features the naturally aspirated 426 cid HEMI engine and the "Ram Rebel TRX" features the supercharged 6.2L HEMI engine. Unlike the concept, the supercharged 6.2L HEMI will not be detuned to 575 hp (429 kW; 583 PS), but is reported to put out the same 707 horsepower as the engines used in the Dodge Challenger SRT Hellcats, Charger SRT Hellcats, and the Jeep Grand Cherokee Trackhawk.

However, the 2019 Dodge Challenger SRT Hellcat Redeye was announced in August that same year which featured essentially the same engine from the Dodge Challenger SRT Demon with variations on the air intake dropping the Redeye's horsepower rating to 797 from the Demon's 808 (also, the 2019 non-Redeye Dodge Challenger SRT Hellcat features airflow improvements raising its horsepower rating to 717 over the prior year's 707).

The "Hellephant" Mopar crate engine scheduled for 2019 release unveiled at the 2018 SEMA (Specialty Equipment Manufacturer's Association) Show, a 7.0-liter supercharged 1,000 horsepower (746 kW; 1,014 PS), 950 lb⋅ft (1,288 N⋅m; 131 kg⋅m) engine. exceeds the characteristics of the Redeye engine, but is also not expected to be part of the production Ram Rebel TRX configuration (when asked, "members of the Mopar team" responded "absolutely not" regarding whether or not the Hellephant engine was being considered for any street applications, which would necessarily rule out inclusion of the production Ram rebel TRX).

Ram announced the production model TRX Launch Edition on August 17, 2020, to be released as a 2021 model. Differences include a new body based on the 5th generation RAM Pickup, a more powerful non-detuned engine making 702 horsepower (523 kW; 712 PS), a functional hood scoop with integrated clearance lights, and a new interior based around the UConnect 12-inch infotainment system. Launch edition models were limited to 702 units and available in an exclusive Anvil Gray colorway.

Over the 3-year model run, Ram released a limited-edition model of the TRX for every model year, sometimes even multiple. Here is the list of them: 2021 - Ram TRX Launch Edition (702 Made) 2022 - Ram TRX Ignition Edition (1,003 Made), Ram TRX Sandblast Edition (1,202) 2023 - Ram TRX Lunar Edition (~1,000 Made), Ram TRX Havoc Edition (~1,500 Made), 2024 - Ram TRX Final Edition (4,000 Made), Ram TRX Special Edition (380? made - same as final edition without the final-edition center armrest badging and splash screen). All of these limited-edition models (except for the launch and final editions) were released mid-model year. Oddly, the base model TRX is more rare than some of these. There is 1707 total base TRXs made, 664 in 2021, 825 in 2022, 218 in 2023.

=== 2026 revival ===
On January 1, 2026, Ram unveiled the new 2027 Ram 1500 TRX. The new truck's horsepower has been bumped up to 777 hp (579 kW; 788 PS) and 680 lb⋅ft (922 N⋅m) of torque to make it more competitive with the Ford F-150 Raptor R, and also includes graphics previously used on the Ram 2500 Power Wagon and SRT badges, with the new name being the Ram 1500 SRT TRX. The truck's new vinyl design is also for to celebrate the relaunch of the Street and Racing Technology (SRT) division. On the same day, the 2027 Ram 2500 Power Wagon now features the 6.7L Cummins ISB diesel engine.

The TRX also got a new special limited edition package to celebrate its return, known as the Bloodshot Night Edition.

== Powertrain ==
All Ram 1500 TRX models were equipped with a supercharged 6.2-liter (380 cu in) Chrysler Hellcat Hemi, which produces 702 hp (523 kW; 712 PS) and 650 lb⋅ft (881 N⋅m) of torque.

== Reception ==
The American Council for an Energy-Efficient Economy ranked the Ram 1500 TRX the worst-performing mass-market vehicle for 2021, 2022, and 2023 on its score "based on an environmental damage index that reflects the cost to human health from pollution associated with vehicle tailpipe emissions, vehicle manufacturing and disposal, and the production and distribution of auto fuel and electricity."
