= Ram pickup (fourth generation) =

Fourth-generation Ram pickup truck

Ram 1500 (fourth generation, DS)
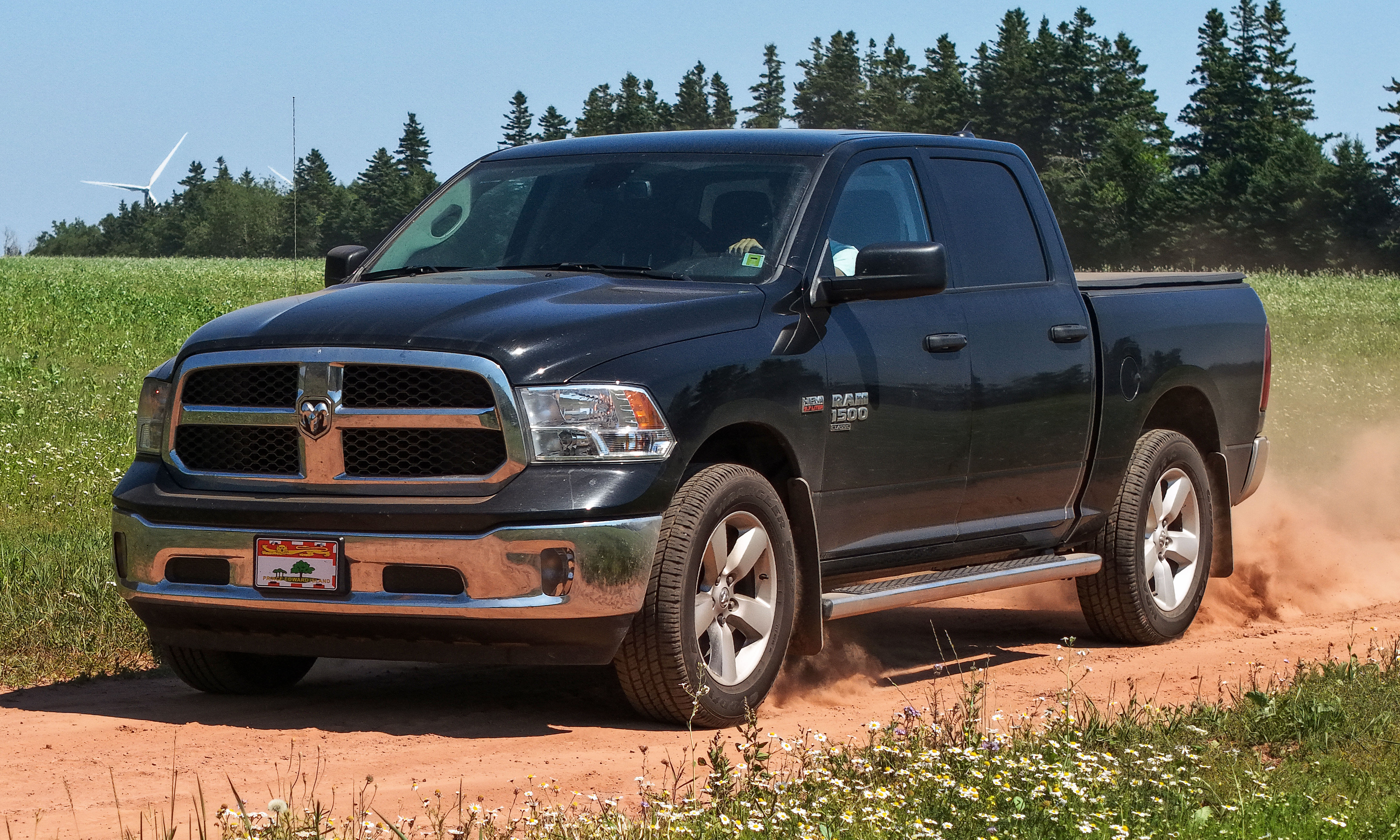
- 2024 Ram 1500 Classic Tradesman

Overview
- Manufacturer: Dodge (2009–2010 model years); Ram Trucks (2011–2024 model years)
- Also called: Dodge Ram 1500 (2009–2010); Ram 1500 (2011–2018); Ram 1500 Classic (2019–2024)
- Production: 2008–2024
- Model years: 2009–2024
- Assembly: United States: Warren, Michigan (Warren Truck Assembly); United States: Fenton, Missouri (St. Louis North Assembly; 2008–2009); Mexico: Saltillo (Saltillo Truck Assembly)

Body and chassis
- Class: Full-size pickup truck
- Body style: 2-door regular cab; 4-door extended cab ("Quad Cab"); 4-door crew cab
- Layout: Front-engine, rear-wheel drive; Front-engine, four-wheel drive

Powertrain
- Engine: Gasoline: 3.7 L PowerTech V6; 4.7 L PowerTech V8; 3.6 L Pentastar V6; 5.7 L Hemi V8; Diesel: 3.0 L EcoDiesel turbocharged V6
- Transmission: 4-speed automatic; 5-speed automatic; 6-speed automatic; 8-speed Torqueflite 8 automatic

Dimensions
- Wheelbase: 120.5–149.5 in (3,060–3,800 mm)
- Length: 209.0–237.9 in (5,310–6,040 mm)
- Width: 79.4 in (2,020 mm)
- Height: 73.3–79.9 in (1,860–2,030 mm)

Chronology
- Predecessor: Dodge Ram 1500 (DR)
- Successor: Ram 1500 (DT)

The Ram 1500 (DS) is the fourth generation of the Ram 1500, manufactured by Dodge and later Ram Trucks. The fourth-generation Ram was introduced in January 2008 at the North American International Auto Show in Detroit, Michigan, for the 2009 model year. Production began in September 2008.

Following the creation of the Ram Trucks brand in 2009, the truck was marketed as the Ram 1500 beginning with the 2011 model year. The fifth-generation Ram 1500 (DT) was introduced for 2019, while the DS remained in production as the lower-priced Ram 1500 Classic through the 2024 model year.

== Design ==
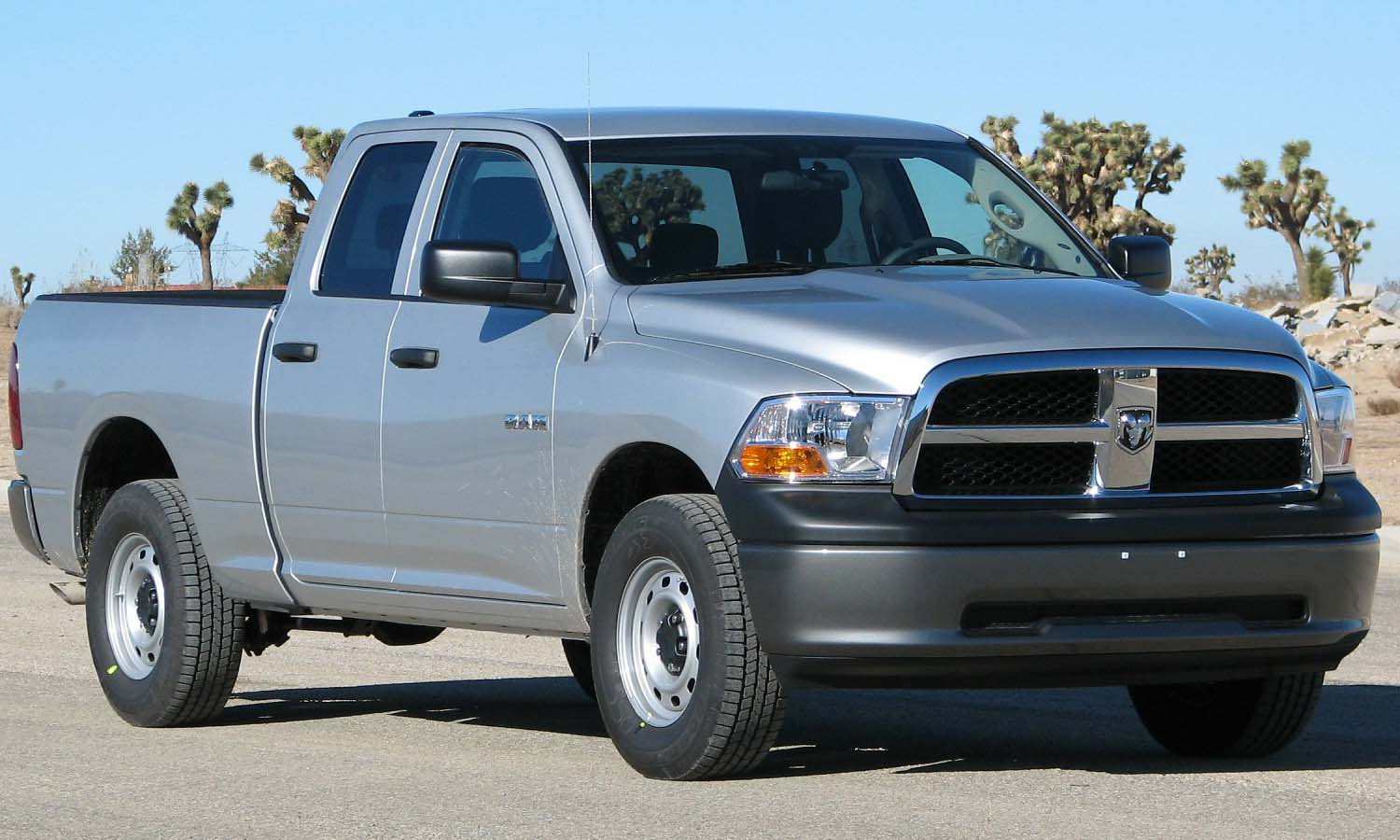
2009 Dodge Ram 1500 ST Quad Cab

The fourth-generation Ram received new exterior sheet metal, a redesigned interior and a new Crew Cab body style. The Crew Cab supplemented the smaller Quad Cab and provided a larger rear passenger compartment. The DS also introduced the optional RamBox cargo-management system, which incorporated lockable storage compartments into the sides of the cargo box.

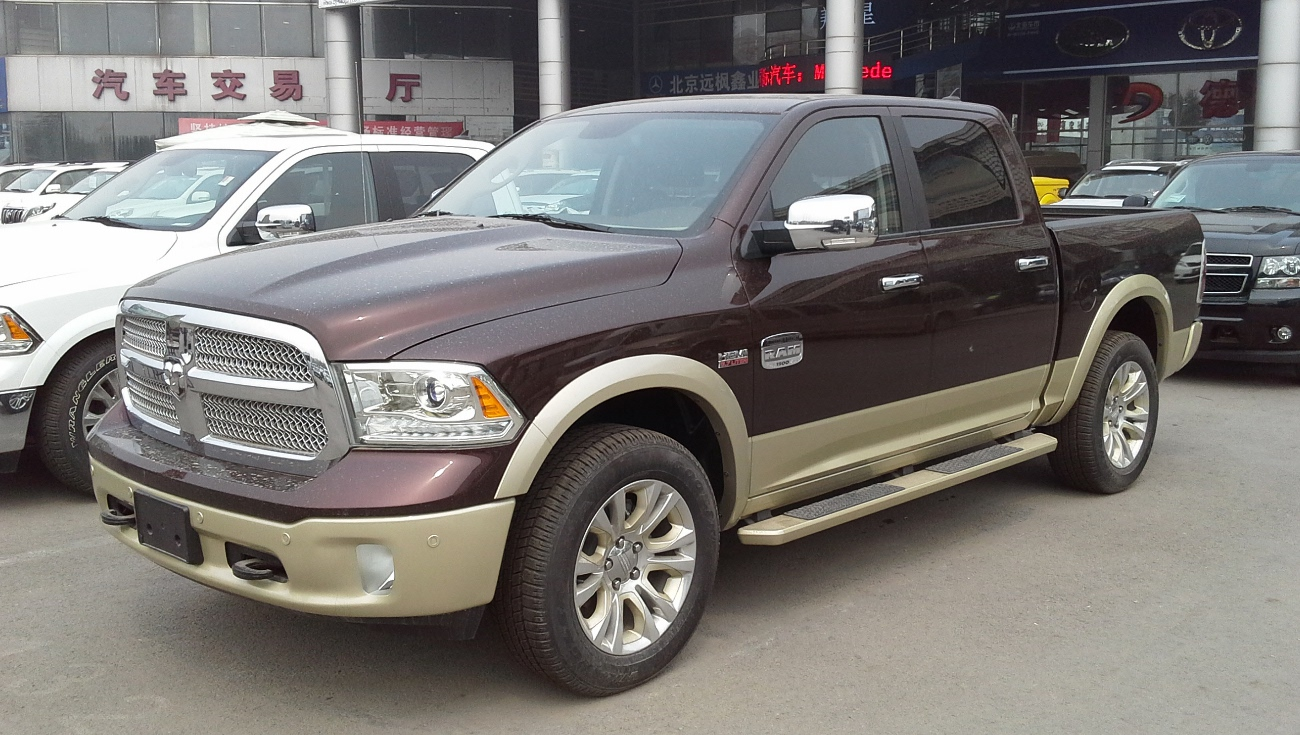
2013 Ram 1500

The Ram 1500 was updated for the 2013 model year with a revised grille and front bumper, refreshed interior, new wheels, and available projector headlamps. The update introduced the 3.6-liter Pentastar V6, an available eight-speed automatic transmission, electric power steering, and active grille shutters on some models.

== Cab configurations ==
The Ram 1500 was available in three cab configurations: a two-door Regular Cab, four-door Quad Cab, or four-door Crew Cab. Regular Cab models were offered with a 6 ft 4 in (1.93 m) or 8 ft (2.44 m) bed, Quad Cab models with a 6-foot-4-inch bed, and Crew Cab models with a 5 ft 7 in (1.70 m) or 6-foot-4-inch bed.

All three cab styles remained available when the truck became the Ram 1500 Classic for 2019. The Regular Cab was not offered on the fifth-generation DT Ram 1500.

== Trim levels ==
At introduction, the Ram 1500 was available in ST, SLT, TRX, Sport and Laramie trim levels.

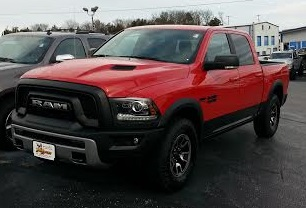
2016 Ram 1500 Rebel

The Ram 1500 Rebel was introduced in 2015 as an off-road-oriented model. It featured a unique grille, powder-coated front bumper, tow hooks, skid plates, all-terrain tires and a raised suspension. The Rebel was offered with either the 3.6-liter Pentastar V6 or 5.7-liter Hemi V8.

== Powertrain ==
The DS was initially offered with a 3.7 L (225.8 cu in) PowerTech V6, 4.7 L (286.8 cu in) PowerTech V8, and 5.7 L (347.8 cu in) Hemi V8.

For 2013, the 3.7-liter V6 was replaced by the 3.6 L (219.7 cu in) Pentastar V6, producing 305 hp (227 kW) and 269 lb⋅ft (365 N⋅m). The Hemi was increased to 395 hp (295 kW) and 407 lb⋅ft (552 N⋅m), and an eight-speed Torqueflite 8 automatic transmission became available. The 4.7-liter V8 was discontinued after 2013.

A 3.0 L (183.1 cu in) EcoDiesel turbocharged V6 was introduced for 2014, producing 240 hp (179 kW) and 420 lb⋅ft (569 N⋅m). The EcoDiesel remained available through the 2019 Ram 1500 Classic and was discontinued for 2020.

Model	Model years	Engine	Transmission	Power	Torque
1500	2009–2012	3.7 L (230 cu in) PowerTech V6	4-speed automatic	215 hp (160 kW)	235 lb⋅ft (319 N⋅m)
1500	2009–2013	4.7 L (290 cu in) PowerTech V8	5- or 6-speed automatic	310 hp (231 kW)	330 lb⋅ft (447 N⋅m)
1500	2009–2012	5.7 L (350 cu in) Hemi V8	5- or 6-speed automatic	390 hp (291 kW)	407 lb⋅ft (552 N⋅m)
1500	2013	5.7 L (350 cu in) Hemi V8	6- or 8-speed automatic	395 hp (295 kW)	407 lb⋅ft (552 N⋅m)
1500	2014–2019	5.7 L (350 cu in) Hemi V8	6- or 8-speed automatic	395 hp (295 kW)	410 lb⋅ft (556 N⋅m)
1500	2020–2024	5.7 L (350 cu in) Hemi V8	8-speed Torqueflite 8 automatic	395 hp (295 kW)	410 lb⋅ft (556 N⋅m)
1500	2013–2024	3.6 L (220 cu in) Pentastar V6	8-speed Torqueflite 8 automatic	305 hp (227 kW)	269 lb⋅ft (365 N⋅m)
1500	2014–2019	3.0 L (180 cu in) EcoDiesel turbo V6	8-speed Torqueflite 8 automatic	240 hp (179 kW)	420 lb⋅ft (569 N⋅m)

== Frame and body ==
The DS uses body-on-frame construction with an independent front suspension and solid rear axle. High-strength steel was used extensively in the frame.

For the 2013 update, additional high-strength steel was used in the frame, while aluminum was used for the hood and front suspension control arms.

== Suspension ==
The fourth-generation Ram 1500 replaced the previous model's rear leaf springs with a five-link, coil-spring rear suspension. An optional four-corner air suspension system was introduced for 2013, providing automatic load leveling and adjustable ride height.

== Ram 1500 Classic (2019–2024) ==
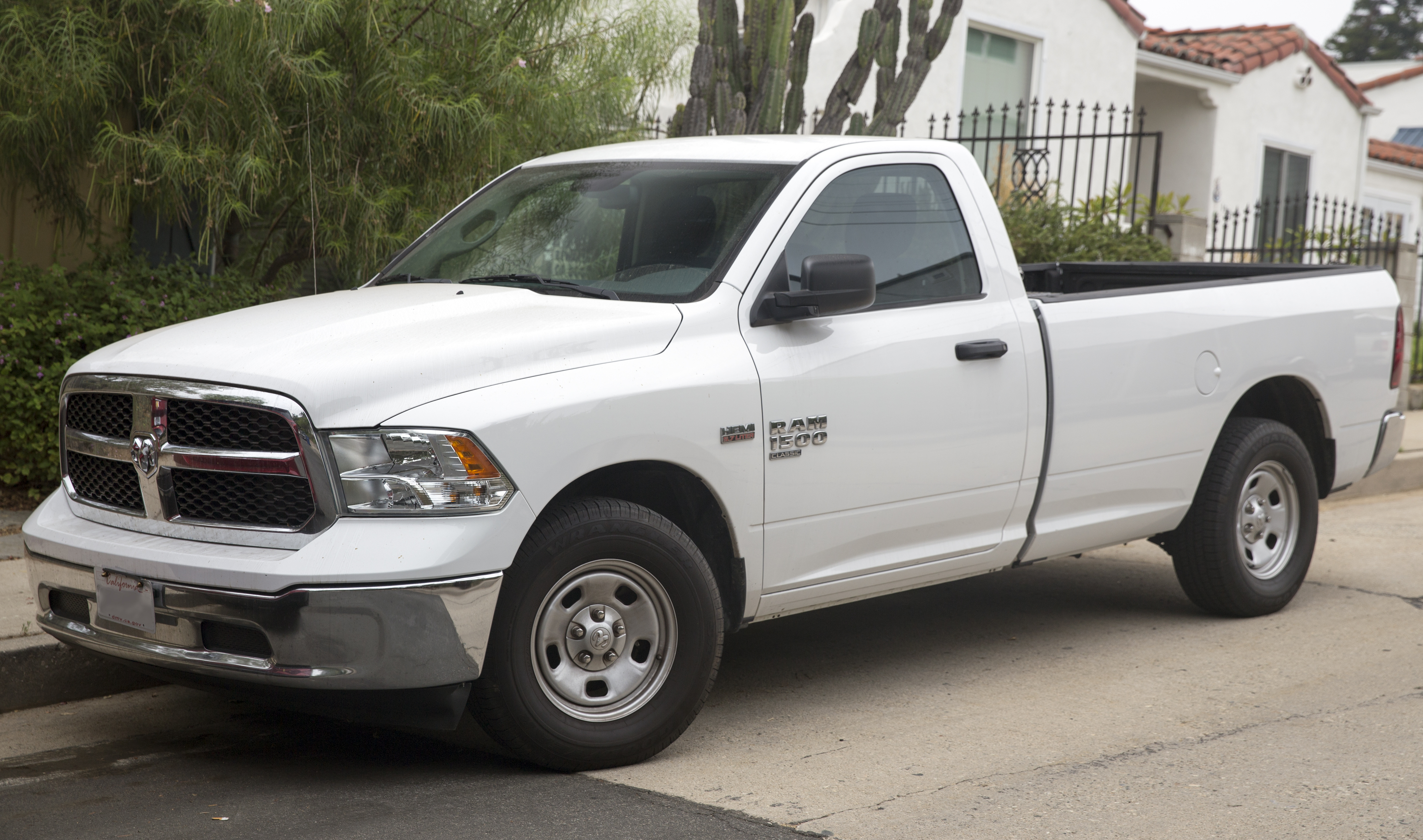
2019 Ram 1500 Classic Tradesman

For the 2019 model year, Ram retained the DS in production alongside the fifth-generation DT and renamed it the Ram 1500 Classic. Ram referred to the two generations internally as "DS" and "DT".

The Classic was initially offered in Tradesman, Express, Big Horn/Lone Star and Special Service Vehicle configurations. Regular, Quad and Crew Cab models remained available. Ram marketed the Classic primarily toward entry-level and commercial buyers. A Warlock model was added in 2019 with a black grille and exterior trim, a factory suspension lift and 20-inch wheels.

The Classic continued with the 3.6-liter Pentastar V6 and 5.7-liter Hemi V8 after the EcoDiesel was discontinued for 2020. By 2024, the retail lineup consisted of Tradesman and Warlock models. Stellantis ended production of the Ram 1500 Classic in 2024.

== Plug-in hybrid ==
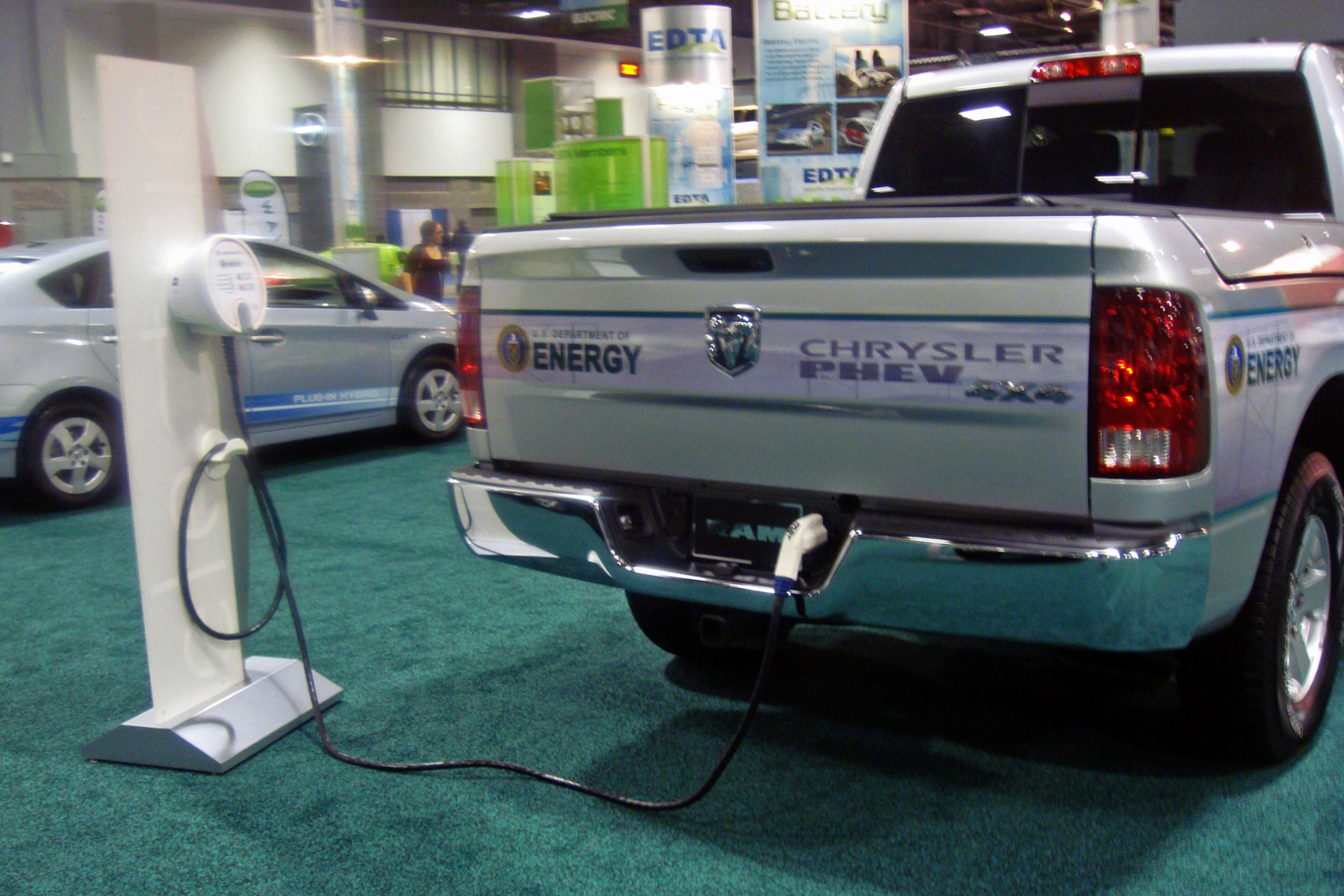
Ram 1500 plug-in hybrid demonstrator at the 2011 Washington Auto Show

Chrysler planned a two-mode hybrid version of the Ram 1500 but canceled the production model in favor of a demonstration fleet of approximately 140 plug-in hybrid trucks developed with support from the United States Department of Energy.

In September 2012, Chrysler temporarily withdrew the demonstration fleet after battery packs in three Ram pickups overheated. No production plug-in hybrid version of the DS was offered.

== Production ==
Production began at Warren Truck Assembly in Warren, Michigan, in September 2008. The 2009 Ram was also assembled at Saint Louis Assembly in Fenton, Missouri, while Saltillo Truck Assembly in Saltillo, Mexico, also produced the DS during its model run.

For 2019, Quad Cab and Crew Cab Classic models were produced at Warren, while Regular Cab and some Crew Cab models were assembled at Saltillo. Production at Warren continued after the introduction of the DT Ram 1500 and ended in 2024.

== Safety ==
The 2018 Ram 1500 was tested by the Insurance Institute for Highway Safety (IIHS):

IIHS Ram 1500 Quad Cab:
Category	Rating
Small overlap frontal offset (Driver)	Marginal
Moderate overlap frontal offset	Good
Side impact (original test)	Good
Roof strength	Marginal
Head restraints and seats	Good

IIHS Ram 1500 Crew Cab:
Category	Rating
Small overlap frontal offset (Driver)	Marginal
Moderate overlap frontal offset	Good
Side impact (original test)	Good
Roof strength	Marginal
Head restraints and seats	Good

== Awards and recognition ==
The Ram 1500 was named Motor Trend Truck of the Year for 2013 following its model-year update. It received the award again for 2014 following the introduction of the EcoDiesel.
