= Ram 1500 (DT) =

Fifth-generation Ram pickup truck

Ram 1500 (fifth generation, DT)
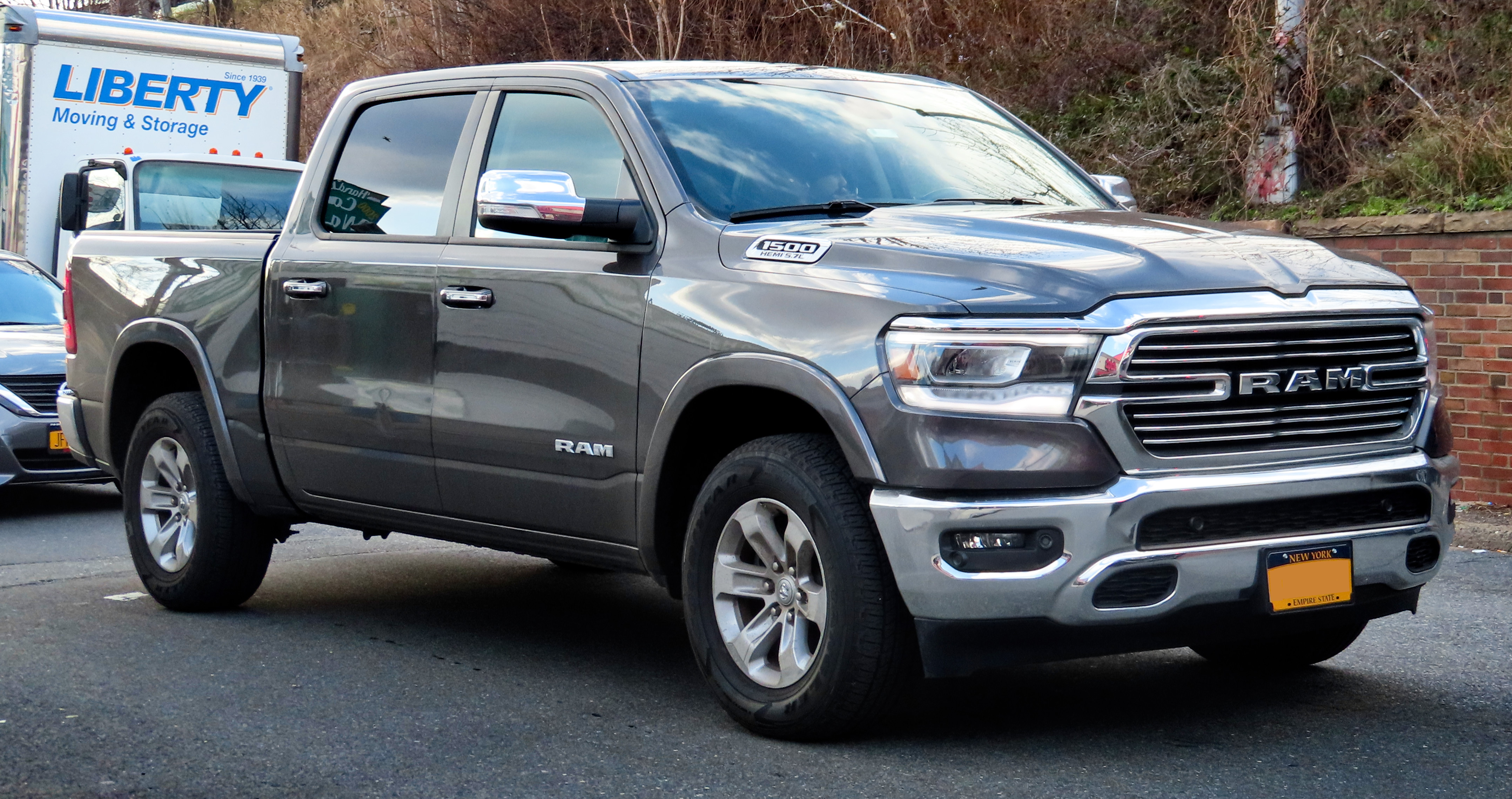
- 2019 Ram 1500 Laramie

Overview
- Manufacturer: Ram Trucks
- Production: 2018–present
- Model years: 2019–present
- Assembly: United States: Sterling Heights, Michigan (Sterling Heights Assembly); Mexico: Saltillo (Saltillo Truck Assembly)

Body and chassis
- Body style: 4-door extended cab ("Quad Cab"); 4-door crew cab
- Related: Ram 1500 REV; Ram 1500 TRX; Ram Heavy Duty; Jeep Wagoneer/Grand Wagoneer (WS)

Powertrain
- Engine: Gasoline: 3.0 L Hurricane twin-turbo I6; 3.6 L Pentastar V6; 5.7 L Hemi V8; Diesel: 3.0 L EcoDiesel turbo V6
- Electric motor: 12 hp (8.9 kW) Continental (MHEV V6); 16 hp (12 kW) Marelli (MHEV V8)
- Transmission: 8-speed TorqueFlite 845RE automatic; 8-speed 8HP75 automatic
- Hybrid drivetrain: eTorque belted alternator starter (MHEV)
- Battery: 0.43 kWh, 48 V lithium-ion (MHEV)

Dimensions
- Wheelbase: 140.5 in (3,569 mm) (Quad cab); 144.6 in (3,673 mm) (Crew cab); 153.5 in (3,899 mm) (Crew cab long bed)
- Length: 228.9 in (5,814 mm) (Quad cab); 232.9 in (5,916 mm) (Crew cab); 241.8 in (6,142 mm) (Crew cab long bed)
- Width: 82.1 in (2,085 mm)
- Height: 77.5–79.2 in (1,968–2,012 mm)

Chronology
- Predecessor: Ram 1500 (DS)

The Ram 1500 (DT) is the fifth generation of the Ram Pickup, manufactured by the Ram Trucks division of Stellantis. The fifth generation Ram was introduced in January 2018 at the North American International Auto Show in Detroit, Michigan as a 2019 model year. Ram 1500 trucks are produced at the Sterling Heights Assembly plant in Sterling Heights, Michigan, United States.

The fourth-generation (DS) continued to be produced through the 2024 model year and was sold alongside the fifth-generation as a lower-priced option (dubbed "Classic").

== Design ==
The Ram 1500 now features the "RAM" lettering (this was only available on the higher trim levels of the previous generation). A vented Sport Hood is available on select trim levels. In addition, a newly redesigned "ram's head" logo is on the tailgate, as well as the steering wheel.

Full LED headlamps are available as an option on most trim levels, although most models also feature LED daytime running lamps (DRLs). Either black or chrome front and rear bumpers, side mirrors, and door and tailgate handles, as well as black or chrome front grilles with unique designs for each trim level are available.

The wheel options go by 18-inch, 20-inch, or 22-inch aluminum-alloy wheels (styled steel for base Tradesman models), depending on the trim level selected. Like Ford/GM (especially) trucks and unlike all prior generations, this marks the first time 6-lug patterns are now used since the first and second generation Dakota mid-size truck.

== Cab configurations ==
The Ram 1500 is available with two different cab configurations: either a four-door Quad Cab (an extended cab with three-quarter-sized, front-hinged doors in the rear) with a standard-length bed, or a four-door crew cab with either a short bed or a standard bed. A two-door regular cab model is no longer available due to low demand.

== Trim levels ==
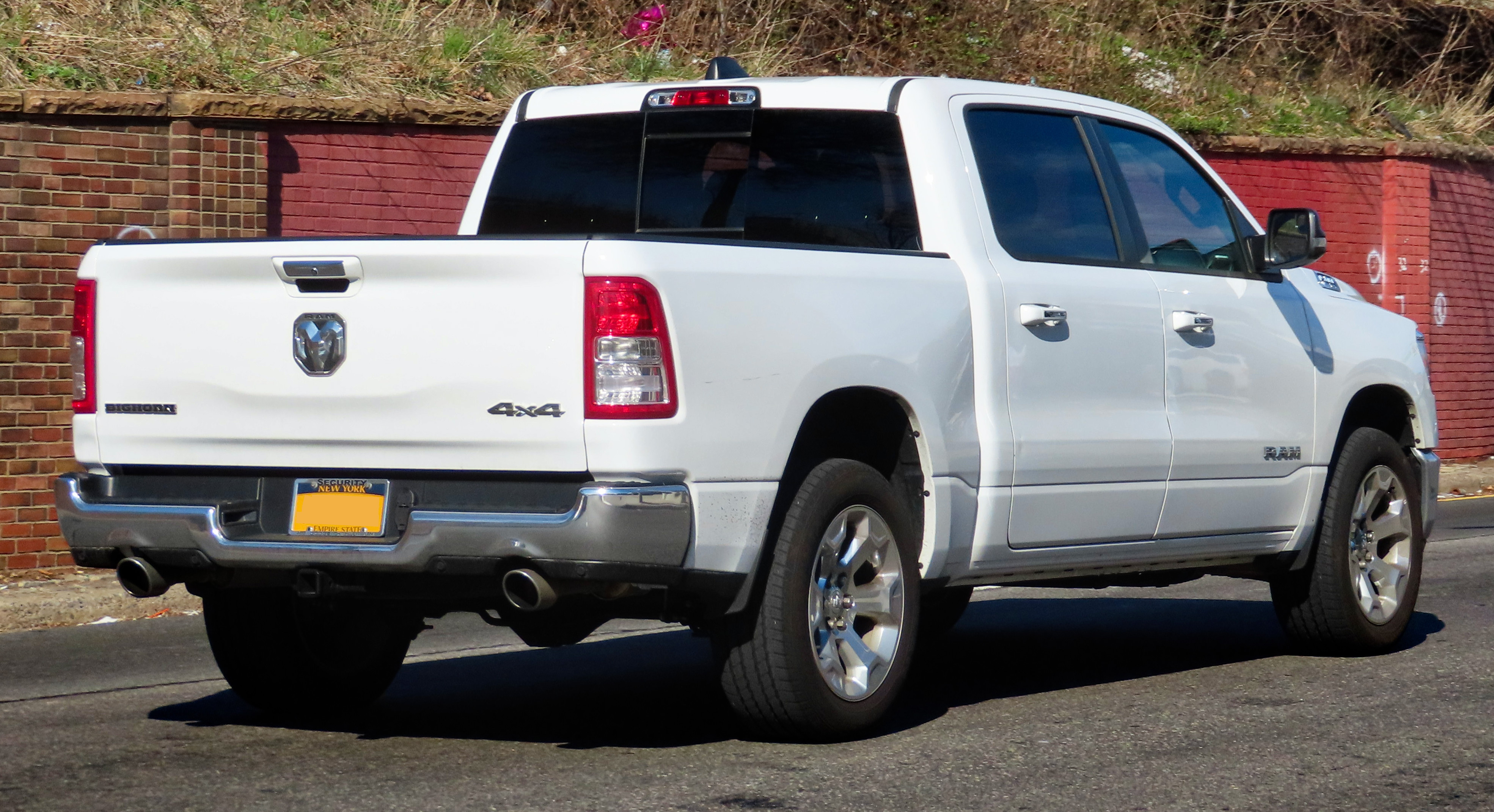
Ram 1500 Big Horn

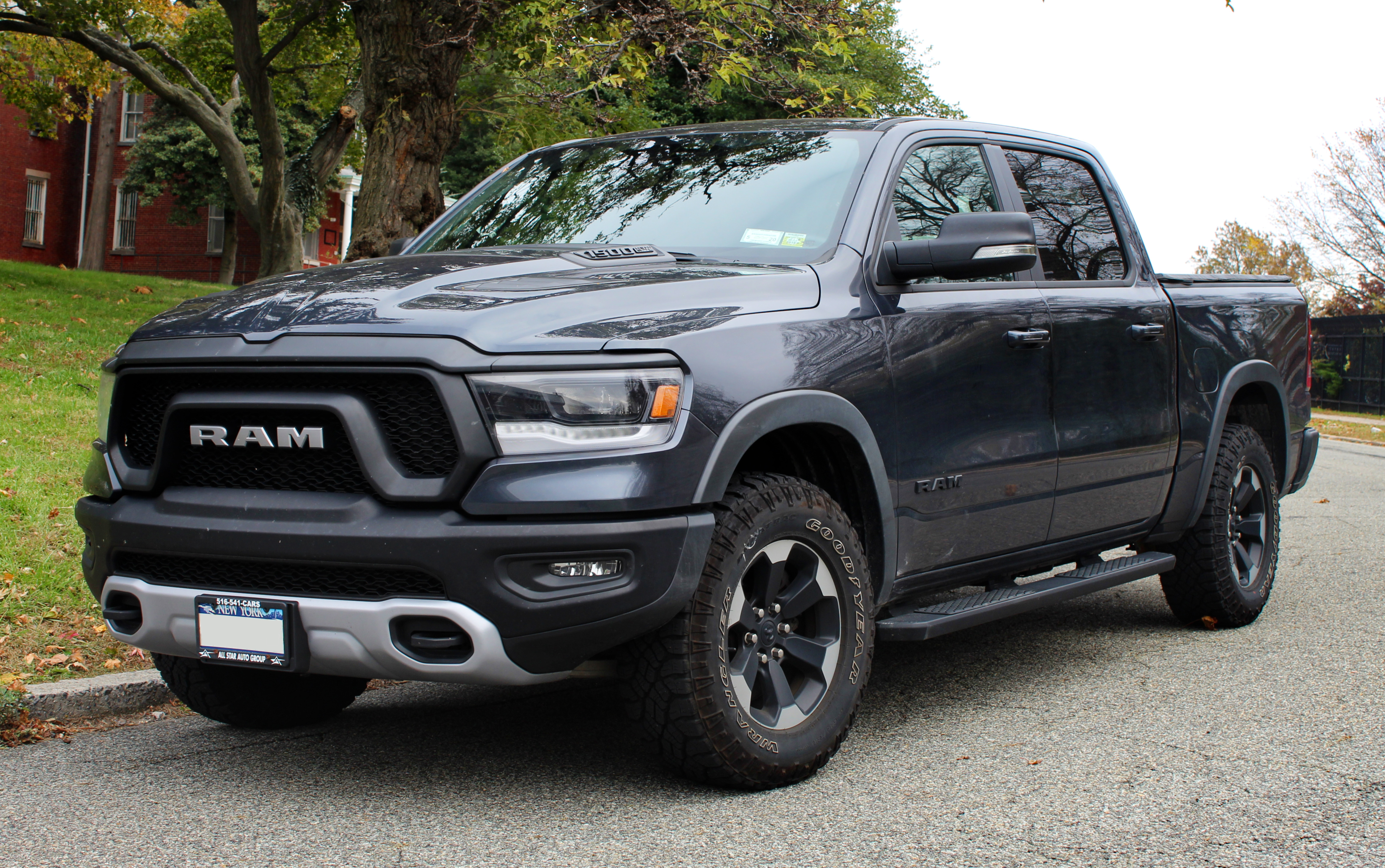
Ram 1500 Rebel

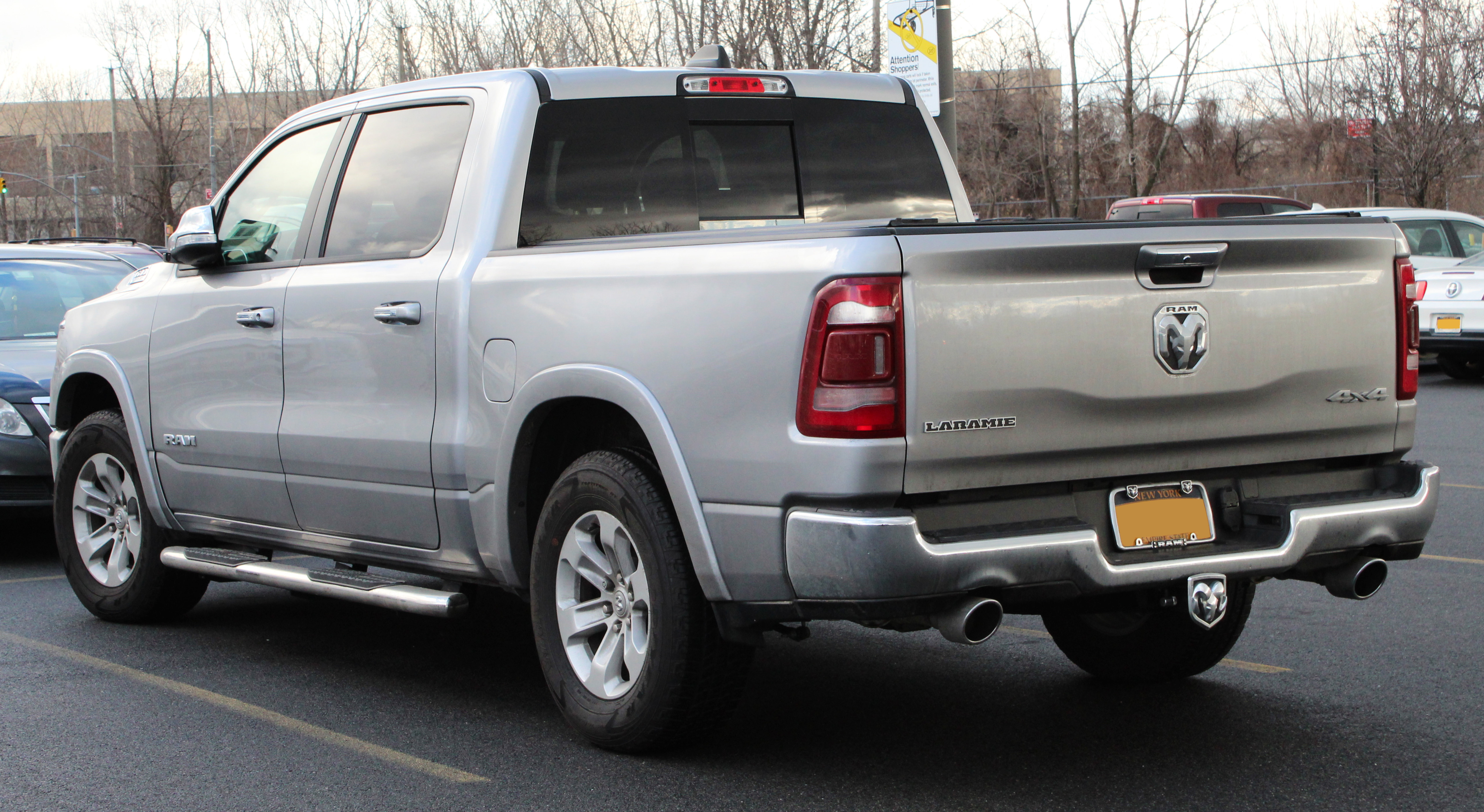
Ram 1500 Laramie

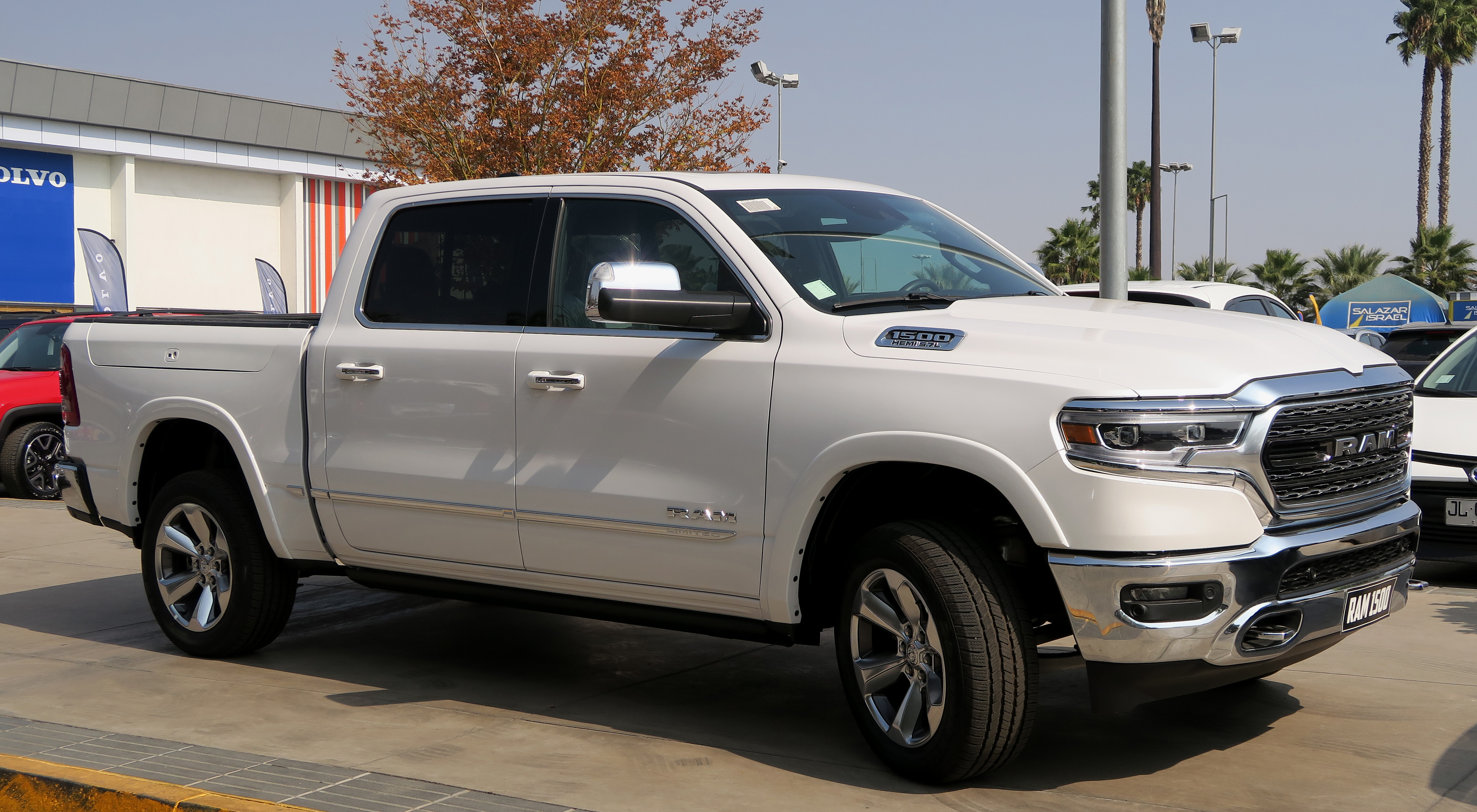
Ram 1500 Limited

2025 Ram 1500 Laramie (facelift)

The Ram 1500 is available in Tradesman, HFE (High Fuel Efficiency), Big Horn, Rebel, Laramie, Laramie Longhorn, and Laramie Limited trim levels (addition of the Sport model for Canada only). Each trim level of the Ram 1500 features its own interior design theme, with different materials and color schemes used throughout. Ram 1500 interior designers used different types of hammers as inspiration for interior designs.

The Tradesman trim level is the basic entry trim level of the Ram 1500. Its design is more basic than other trim levels, with halogen headlamps, incandescent taillamps, and a black plastic grille. The interior contains vinyl or cloth seats and the Uconnect 3 5.0BT radio.

The HFE (High Fuel Efficiency) trim level is configured to squeeze out as much fuel efficiency as possible from the Ram 1500. The HFE is only available with the V6 engine with the eTorque hybrid system (except with the 2021–2022 models which were also available with the EcoDiesel), the most economical rear axle ratio, 20-inch wheels with low rolling resistance tires, a smaller 23-US-gallon (87 L; 19 imp gal) fuel tank, and in a 4×2 configuration (reducing weight).

More up-level than the Tradesman, the Big Horn/Lone Star comes standard with everything on the Tradesman plus fog lights, chrome grille, bumpers, and door handles, as well as a leather-wrapped steering wheel. The larger Uconnect 4 8.4-inch touchscreen also becomes available, either with or without navigation. The Lone Star, similar to "Texas Edition" trucks offered by other manufacturers, is mainly identical to the Big Horn, but only sold exclusively in the state of Texas, whereas the Big Horn is sold in all other states and in Canada. The Lone Star Silver comes with a chrome luxury grill, 20-inch aluminum wheels, and side steps. The Big Horn/Lone Star replaces the previous generation's SLT trim.

The North Edition adds off-road oriented features, such as Hill Descent Control and Tow Hooks, combined with body color bumpers, mirrors, and grille. With this special edition comes the Uconnect 4 8.4 touchscreen, 7-inch digital cluster display, dual zone climate control, and heated front seats and steering wheel.

The off-road oriented trim level, the Rebel offers an electronic locking rear differential, 33-inch tires, and tow hooks. It comes standard with the Uconnect 3 5.0BT radio but can be upgraded to the Uconnect 4 8.4-inch touchscreen.

The Laramie is the mid-level trim of the Ram 1500. It features LED headlamps and tail lamps as standard, heated and ventilated leather seats, a standard Uconnect 5 Nav 12-inch touchscreen, 7-inch digital cluster display, and a memory feature. The Uconnect 5 Nav 14.4-inch touchscreen and 12-inch digital cluster display is available with the Level 2 Equipment Group option.

An upgrade from the Laramie, the Laramie Longhorn features more luxurious features such as standard navigation, LED projector headlamps, chrome side steps, and genuine wood and leather in the interior. The Uconnect 4C 12-inch touchscreen is optional.

The Limited trim level is the most luxurious model of the Ram 1500 lineup. The Uconnect 4C 12-inch touchscreen is standard, as well as safety features such as blind spot monitoring, rear cross path detection, and trailer detection, and a four-corner air suspension. A 19-speaker Harman Kardon audio system is available.

The Sport is a Canadian-only trim level that offers a sportier look in addition to a standard Uconnect 4 8.4-inch touchscreen, 7-inch digital cluster display, and heated front seats. Although the package is not available in the United States, buyers in the U.S. market can still order styling elements from the Canadian Sport trim level on some Ram 1500 trim levels. The only engine choice in this trim is the 5.7L Hemi.

== Powertrain ==
The base engine for almost all Ram 1500 trims is the 3.6-liter (220 cu in) Chrysler Pentastar, a V6 engine, carried over from the fourth generation Ram pickup, which produces 305 horsepower (227 kW) and 269 pound force-feet (365 N⋅m) of torque. However, for the fifth generation, the engine is now equipped with the "eTorque" belted alternator starter system, a type of mild hybrid. A motor–generator is attached to the engine's serpentine belt adding torque, cranking the engine in a start-stop system, or generating electricity with regenerative braking by acting as a type of engine brake. The motor–generator is built by Continental and adds 12 hp (9 kW) and 39 lb⋅ft (53 N⋅m) of torque to the belt which multiplies it to create 90 lb⋅ft (122 N⋅m) of assist. Energy is stored in 0.43 kWh, 48 V lithium-ion battery mounted inside the passenger cabin on the rear wall between seats and pickup bed.

An upgrade is available to the 5.7-liter (1.3 imp gal; 1.5 U.S. gal) Chrysler Hemi, a V8 engine, which produces 395 horsepower (295 kW) and 410 pound force-feet (556 N⋅m) of torque. The engine is equipped with Variable Cam Timing (VCT) and a Multi-Displacement System (MDS) which shuts down four of the engine's eight cylinders when operating between 1,000 and 3,000 rpm, to save fuel. The Hemi V8 is also available (mandatory for the 2023 and Present model years) with slightly more powerful eTorque system with a motor–generator supplied by Magneti Marelli adding 16 hp (12 kW) and 49 lb⋅ft (66 N⋅m) of torque to the belt which multiplies it to create 130 lb⋅ft (176 N⋅m) of assist.

For the 2019 through Present model years, an upgrade is available to the 3.0-liter (180 cu in) EcoDiesel, a turbocharged diesel V6 engine, which produces 260 horsepower (194 kW) and 480 pound force-feet (651 N⋅m) of torque.

The Hemi-powered 1500 was discontinued in Australia in 2023 as the new electrical system in the MY25 update would require re-development for the right-hand drive conversion.

Model	Model years	Engine	Transmission	Power	Torque
1500	2019–	3.6 L eTorque Pentastar V6	8-speed TorqueFlite 845RE automatic	305 hp (227 kW) at 6,600 rpm	269 lb⋅ft (365 N⋅m) at 4,900 rpm
1500	2019–2022; 2027-	5.7 L Hemi V8	8-speed TorqueFlite 8HP75 automatic	395 hp (295 kW) at 5,600 rpm	410 lb⋅ft (556 N⋅m) at 3,950 rpm
1500	2019–2024; 2026-2027	5.7 L eTorque Hemi V8	8-speed TorqueFlite 8HP75 automatic	395 hp (295 kW) at 5,600 rpm	410 lb⋅ft (556 N⋅m) at 3,950 rpm
1500	2020–2023	3.0 L EcoDiesel turbo V6	8-speed TorqueFlite 8HP75 automatic	260 hp (194 kW) at 5,600 rpm	480 lb⋅ft (651 N⋅m) at 3,950 rpm
1500	2025-	3.0 L Hurricane twin-turbo I6	8 Speed TorqueFlite 8HP75 automatic	540 hp (403 kW) at 5,200 rpm	521 lb⋅ft (706 N⋅m) at 3,900 rpm
1500	2025-	3.0 L Hurricane twin-turbo I6	8 Speed TorqueFlite 8HP75 automatic	420 hp (313 kW) at 5,700 rpm	469 lb⋅ft (636 N⋅m) at 3,500 rpm

== Frame and body ==
The frame and body structures feature 98 and 54 percent high-strength low-alloy steel respectively. Innovative high-strength steels allow automotive components to be made thinner, and thereby lighter. The Ram 1500 reduced its weight by nearly 120 pounds (54 kg) from the chassis. The frame alone accounts for 100 pounds (45 kg) of weight savings. The truck has lost around 225 pounds (102 kg) overall when compared to the prior generation. Aluminum is used for the hood, tailgate, engine mounts, and lower control arms.

A properly equipped Ram 1500 can tow up to 12,750 pounds (5,780 kg) and has a payload of up to 2,300 pounds (1,000 kg).

== Suspension ==
The Ram 1500 also features the previously-available adaptive multi-level air suspension system, but the system now features additional "modes" for off-road use, as well as a mode that lowers the vehicle by 2 in (50 mm) to allow for easier entry and exit. The latter feature can be activated via a button on the keyless entry key fob. In addition, the Ram 1500 features active front grille shutters, which are now driver-adjustable, as well as a lower drag coefficient for improved aerodynamic performance.

Also new for the Ram 1500 is a new 4×4 Off-Road Package, which includes a factory-equipped suspension lift, off-road tires, and enhanced off-road performance and handling. It is available on all trim levels, when equipped with 4×4.

Frequency response damping (FRD) shock absorbers are standard, allowing for more aggressive damping during cornering and braking.

== Driver assistance systems ==
A toggle switch in the lower portion of the dashboard control parking sensor activation. The Ram 1500 gets blind spot monitoring that automatically extends down the length of a trailer when it is attached. The truck comes with a 360-degree surround view camera system providing a bird's-eye view of the vehicle via four cameras. It can park perpendicular and parallel by its own by controlling steering, but braking and gear shift are still responsibly controlled by the driver.

== In-car entertainment systems ==
The Ram 1500 offers a choice of four different in-car entertainment systems, dependent upon the trim level chosen:

The base Uconnect 3 5.0BT system, standard on Big Horn/Lone Star and optional on Tradesman, includes a five-inch touchscreen display, AM/FM radio, Bluetooth with hands-free calling and wireless audio streaming, USB and auxiliary inputs, a rearview backup camera display, and integrated digital compass. SiriusXM satellite radio can be added as an option.

The mid-level Uconnect 4 8.4 system, standard on Rebel, Laramie and optional on Big Horn/Lone Star, adds the following features to the Uconnect 3 5.0BT system: an 8.4-inch touchscreen display, Apple CarPlay and Android Auto integration, and a USB-C input that supports USB fast charging.

The premium Uconnect 4C 8.4 system, standard on Laramie Longhorn and optional on Big Horn/Lone Star, Rebel, and Laramie, adds the following features to the mid-level Uconnect 4 8.4 system: GPS Navigation, HD Radio, and Uconnect Guardian Services powered by SiriusXM which provides subscription-based communications, in-vehicle security, emergency services, and remote diagnostics systems.

The top-of-the-line Uconnect 4C 12.0 system, standard on Limited and optional on all models except the base Tradesman, adds the following features to the premium Uconnect 4C 8.4 system: twelve-inch, portrait-oriented touchscreen display capable of operating multiple functions at the same time and a multi-angle camera system.

In addition to the four different touchscreen systems available, there are three different audio systems available:

- The base six-speaker audio system, standard on Tradesman, Big Horn/Lone Star, and Rebel, includes speakers includes speakers mounted in all four doors of the vehicle. It is not available with the Uconnect 4C 12.0 system.
- The mid-level Alpine Electronics ten-speaker premium audio system, standard on Laramie and Laramie Longhorn and available on the Big Horn/Lone Star and Rebel, adds the following features to the base audio system: a 506-watt digital amplifier, an under-seat-mounted subwoofer, a center instrument panel-mounted speaker, and speakers mounted in the rear headliner of the truck. An Alpine Electronics emblem appears on the center instrument panel-mounted speaker. It requires either the Uconnect 4 8.4 or Uconnect 4C 8.4 infotainment systems.
- The top-of-the-line Harman/Kardon nineteen-speaker premium audio system, standard on Limited and optional on Laramie Longhorn, adds the following features to the mid-level audio system: a 900-watt digital amplifier, small speakers to the upper portion of both front doors, and aluminum speaker grilles that bear the Harman/Kardon emblem. It requires the Uconnect 4C 12.0 system.

For the 2022 model year, Ram equipped most of its trucks with an all-new Uconnect 5 infotainment suite, available in five-inch, 8.4-inch, and 12-inch sizes, which came as standard equipment on most trim levels. The Uconnect 5 infotainment suite, powered by Android, added a built-in virtual assistant, and wireless Apple CarPlay and Android Auto smartphone integration (in addition to their wired counterparts), as well as enhanced functionality and user customizability. Base models will still receive the previous Uconnect 3 5.0BT radio as standard equipment, though these models can also be upgraded to the 8.4-inch Uconnect 5 system.

== Interior ==
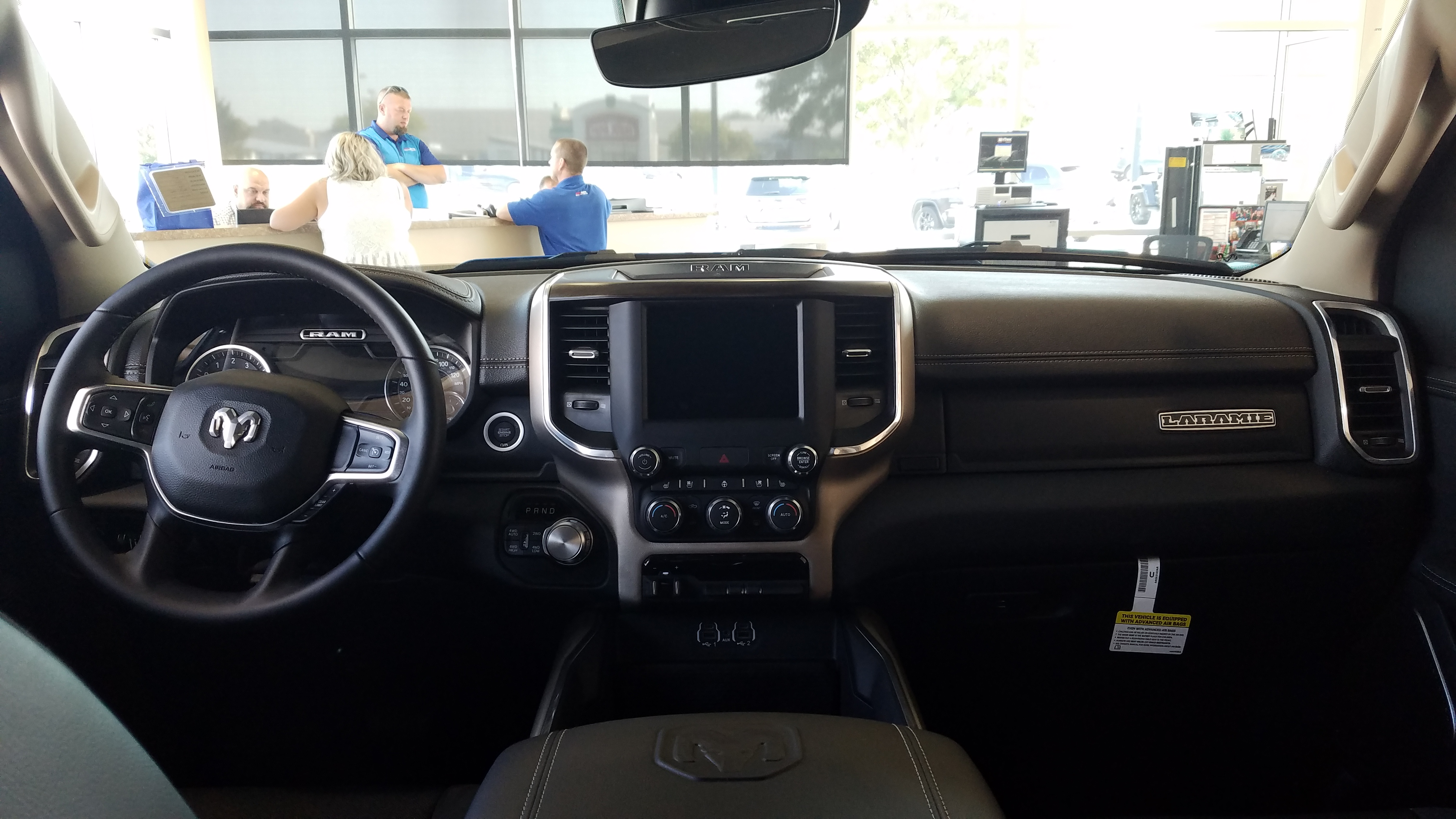
Ram 1500 Laramie interior

The center console can be configured in 12 different ways. An available panoramic sunroof features 10 square feet (0.93 m^{2}) of area.

The Ram's newly redesigned interior features increased head and leg room, as well as genuine leather trim. In addition, the Limited includes additional stitched leather-trimmed dashboard surfaces and door panel trim. Like the previous-generation Ram, the new Ram uses genuine wood trim throughout their interiors. It also offers an optional 12 in (300 mm) touchscreen infotainment system, as well as an optional 900-watt, nineteen-speaker Harman/Kardon audio system. A reconfigurable TFT LCD full-color instrument cluster is also available on most trim levels.

== Product Red Special Edition (2022) ==
For the 2022 model year, Stellantis announced a partnership with Product Red, and each brand released a (RED)-branded vehicle. For 2022, Ram offered a (RED) Edition 1500, derived from the top-of-the-line Limited trim level. Special features on the (RED) Edition 1500 included special exterior badging, black-finished wheels, and unique interior details. Proceeds from each (RED) Edition 1500 sold were donated to the Product Red Foundation. In addition, Ram has released a line of special-edition (RED)-themed merchandise, including coolers, plaid shirts, work gloves, and T-shirts.

== Production ==
The Ram 1500 is built at the Sterling Heights Assembly Plant in Sterling Heights, Michigan. The company retooled the plant to handle the Ram 1500; previously, the plant produced the Chrysler 200, which ended production after the 2017 model year. In February 2026, Stellantis started production of Ram 1500 Crew Cabs at the Saltillo Truck Assembly plant in Mexico, marking the first time the DT Ram has been produced outside the U.S. since its introduction in 2018 (2019 model year).

For the Australian market, Ram Trucks Australia is responsible for converting the trucks to right-hand drive, which is converted by Walkinshaw Group.

== Safety ==
The 2022 Ram was tested by the Insurance Institute for Highway Safety (IIHS), and the top trim of the Crew Cab version received a Top Safety Pick award:

IIHS Ram 1500 Quad Cab:
Category	Rating	
Small overlap frontal offset (Driver)	Good	
Small overlap frontal offset (Passenger)	Good	
Moderate overlap frontal offset	Good	
Side impact (original test)	Good	
Roof strength	Good	
Head restraints and seats	Good	
Headlights	Marginal	
Front crash prevention (Vehicle-to-Vehicle)	Superior	optional
Front crash prevention (Vehicle-to-Pedestrian, day)	Advanced	optional
Child seat anchors (LATCH) ease of use	Acceptable	

IIHS Ram 1500 Crew Cab:
Category	Rating	
Small overlap frontal offset (Driver)	Good	
Small overlap frontal offset (Passenger)	Good	
Moderate overlap frontal offset	Good	
Side impact (original test)	Good	
Roof strength	Good	
Head restraints and seats	Good	
Headlights	Good / Marginal	varies by trim/option
Front crash prevention (Vehicle-to-Vehicle)	Superior	optional
Front crash prevention (Vehicle-to-Pedestrian, day)	Advanced	optional
Seat belt reminders	Marginal	
Child seat anchors (LATCH) ease of use	Marginal	

ANCAP test results RAM 1500 Limited variants (2025)
Overall
Grading:	70% (Gold)	
Test	Points	%
Pedestrian:	17.82	74%
Safety assist:	8.81	70%

== Awards and recognition ==
The Ram 1500 received multiple industry awards even before its availability to customers.

=== 2018 ===
- Cars.com 2018 Detroit Auto Show's Best In Show
- Autoblog Editor's #1 Pick of the 2018 Detroit Auto Show
- Popular Mechanics Automotive Excellence Awards 2018
- Auto 123.com's Pickup of the Year
- 2019 Motor Trend's Truck of the Year
- Green Car Journal's 2019 Green Truck of the Year
- 2019 Top Pick Award by autoTRADER.ca
- Best Buy designation by Le Guide de l’Auto/The Car Guide (full size pickup)
- 2019 Ram 1500 Rebel Pickup Truck of the Year by Four Wheeler Magazine

Wards 10 Best

- 2018 Wards 10 Best Interiors
- 2018 Wards 10 Best User Experiences

Texas Automotive Writers Association

- Off-Road Pickup Truck of Texas (Ram 1500 Rebel)
- Full Size Pickup Truck of Texas
- Official Truck of Texas

=== 2019 ===
- 2019 North American Truck of the Year by NACTOY.
- Best Family Car and Truck award by the Greater Atlanta Automotive Media Association.
