= Sterling Heights Assembly =

American automotive factory in Michigan

- Operated: 1953–present
- Location: 38111 Van Dyke; Sterling Heights, Michigan
- Coordinates: 42.57°N 83.03°W
- Industry: Automotive
- Products: Automobiles
- Employees: 7,008 (2022)
- Area: 286 acres (1.16 km^{2})
- Volume: 5,000,000 sq ft (460,000 m^{2})
- Owners: Chrysler Missile Division (1953–1980); Volkswagen (1980–1983); Chrysler (1983–1998); DaimlerChrysler (1998–2007); Chrysler (2007–2014); Fiat Chrysler Automobiles (2014–2021); Stellantis (2021–present)

The Sterling Heights Assembly Plant (abbrevriated SHAP), is a 5,000,000 sq ft (460,000 m^{2}) automotive manufacturing factory in Sterling Heights, Michigan, currently operated by Stellantis North America.

== History ==
The factory was opened by Chrysler under its Missile Division in 1953 to produce missiles. The nearby "Sterling Stamping" opened in 1965. The plant was operated by the US Army for a number of years and was purchased by Volkswagen of America in 1980. VW entered a sales slump and never produced any vehicles at the plant. In 1983, the plant was sold to Chrysler to produce the Dodge Shadow and Plymouth Sundance.

After the plant was modernized in 2006, the assembly line and tooling for the outgoing Stratus and Sebring were sold to OAO GAZ and shipped to that company's factory in Nizhny Novgorod in Russia. GAZ continued to produce the Stratus under license there until 2010, marketed as the Volga Siber.

In May 2009 it was announced that the Sterling Heights Assembly plant would close by December 2010, with the adjacent stamping plant to remain open. A decision of the Chrysler board to make the new 200 model allowed it to bring new life into the plant and saved it from being closed.

In 2010 Chrysler purchased the plant from Old Carco LLC for US$20 million. The plant will retain its current 1,200 employees. Chrysler broke ground on a new paint shop at the plant in June 2011. This came after an announcement of an 850 million dollar investment in October 2010.

When the Chrysler 200 was discontinued in December 2016, FCA announced that the Sterling Heights facility would receive a $1.49 billion investment to retool so it can build the next-generation Ram 1500 pickup, which will be transferred from the Warren Truck Assembly so that it can build the all-new, full size Jeep Wagoneer with a planned launch in 2018.

== Vehicles produced ==
=== Future ===
- Ram 1500 REV (April 2027-to commence)

=== Current ===
- Ram 1500 (DT) (2018–present)
- Ram 1500 TRX (December 2020–February 2024, January 2026–present)

=== Former ===
- Sterling Heights Assembly
  - Chrysler 200 Sedan (2010–2016) and Convertible (2010–2014)
  - Lancia Flavia (2011–2014)
  - Dodge Avenger (February 2007–2014)
  - Chrysler Sebring Sedan (2000–2010) and Convertible (1996–2010)
  - Plymouth Breeze (1995–2000)
  - Dodge Stratus (June 1994–2006)
  - Chrysler Cirrus (June 1994–2000)
  - Dodge Daytona (1992–1993)
  - Dodge Shadow/Plymouth Sundance (August 1986–March 1994)
  - Chrysler LeBaron GTS/Dodge Lancer (1984–1989)
- Sterling Stamping
  - Stamped metal panels
