= Ram 1500 REV =

Range-extended light-duty full-size pickup truck

Overview
- Manufacturer: Ram Trucks (Stellantis North America)
- Also called: Ram 1500 Ramcharger (pre-production)
- Production: April 2027 (to commence; originally 2024)
- Model years: 2027–present
- Assembly: United States: Sterling Heights, Michigan (Sterling Heights Assembly)

Body and chassis
- Class: Full-size pickup truck
- Body style: 4-door crew cab
- Layout: Front-engine, dual-motor, all-wheel-drive
- Platform: STLA Frame
- Related: Ram 1500 (DT); Ram 1500 TRX; Ram Heavy Duty; Jeep Wagoneer/Grand Wagoneer (WS)

Powertrain
- Engine: Gasoline range extender: 3.6 L Pentastar n/a V6
- Electric motor: 340 hp (250 kW; 340 PS) (front); 319 kW (319 kW; 434 PS) (rear)
- Power output: 654 hp (488 kW)
- Hybrid drivetrain: Series hybrid/EREV/PHEV
- Battery: 92 kWh lithium-ion
- Range: 690 mi (1,110 km)
- Electric range: 145 mi (233 km)
- Plug-in charging: CCS: 145 kW, 400 V DC

Dimensions
- Curb weight: 7,507 lb (3,405 kg)

The Ram 1500 REV is an upcoming range-extended light-duty full-size pickup truck to be produced by Ram Trucks and is based on the fifth-generation Ram 1500. It was announced by Ram Trucks in November 2023. Production was originally planned to start in early 2024, but was delayed to late 2026, and delayed again to April 2027

== Background ==
The truck has electric motors for both the front and rear axle. The front axle motor is rated at 340 horsepower (250 kW; 340 PS), while the rear motor is rated at 319 hp (238 kW; 323 PS). The 3.6 L Pentastar V6 gasoline engine is mated to a 174 hp (130 kW; 176 PS) generator to recharge the battery and extend the truck's range, but lacks any mechanical linkage to the wheels. When additional power or traction is not needed, the front motor automatically disconnects from the wheels to improve efficiency.

Ram expects the truck to have an all-electric range of 145 miles (233 km) using its battery which has a 70.8 kWh usable capacity out of its 92 kWh gross capacity. It has a range of 690 miles (1,110 km) when the gasoline engine is used with the 27 U.S. gallons (102 L) fuel tank. The truck will be equipped with a CCS connector for DC fast charging, enabling 50 miles (80 km) of all-electric range to be added in approximately 10 minutes. It also expects the truck to produce up to 663 horsepower (494 kW; 672 PS) and 615 pound-feet (834 N⋅m) of torque, a 0 to 60 mph time of 4.4 seconds, a towing capacity of up to 14,000 pounds (6,400 kg), and a payload capacity of up to 2,625 pounds (1,191 kg).

Unlike the regular Ram 1500 that uses standard rear coil springs, the REV features an air suspension in the rear as standard equipment.

In September 2025, the production model was renamed REV, after the cancellation of the all-electric truck by the same name.

== All-electric concept ==
The Ram Revolution Concept vehicle was revealed on Ram social media outlets in January 2023, showcasing a futuristic design and various high-tech features, including an augmented reality head-up display, rear suicide doors, and a collapsible pass-through between the bed and cab. A webpage on the Ram website also went live for the concept model. The name was later shortened to Ram 1500 REV.

The concept was built on Stellantis' STLA Frame platform, designed specifically for large EVs with body-on-frame construction. Two battery sizes were to be offered and all-wheel drive would have been standard.

The start of production was originally scheduled for the end of 2024, with deliveries to buyers in North America planned for early 2025. In December 2024, following changes in the Stellantis management board and in response to market conditions, the production start date was delayed to 2026. In September 2025, production of the fully-electric REV was cancelled, with the company citing a lack of demand for battery-electric pickup trucks.

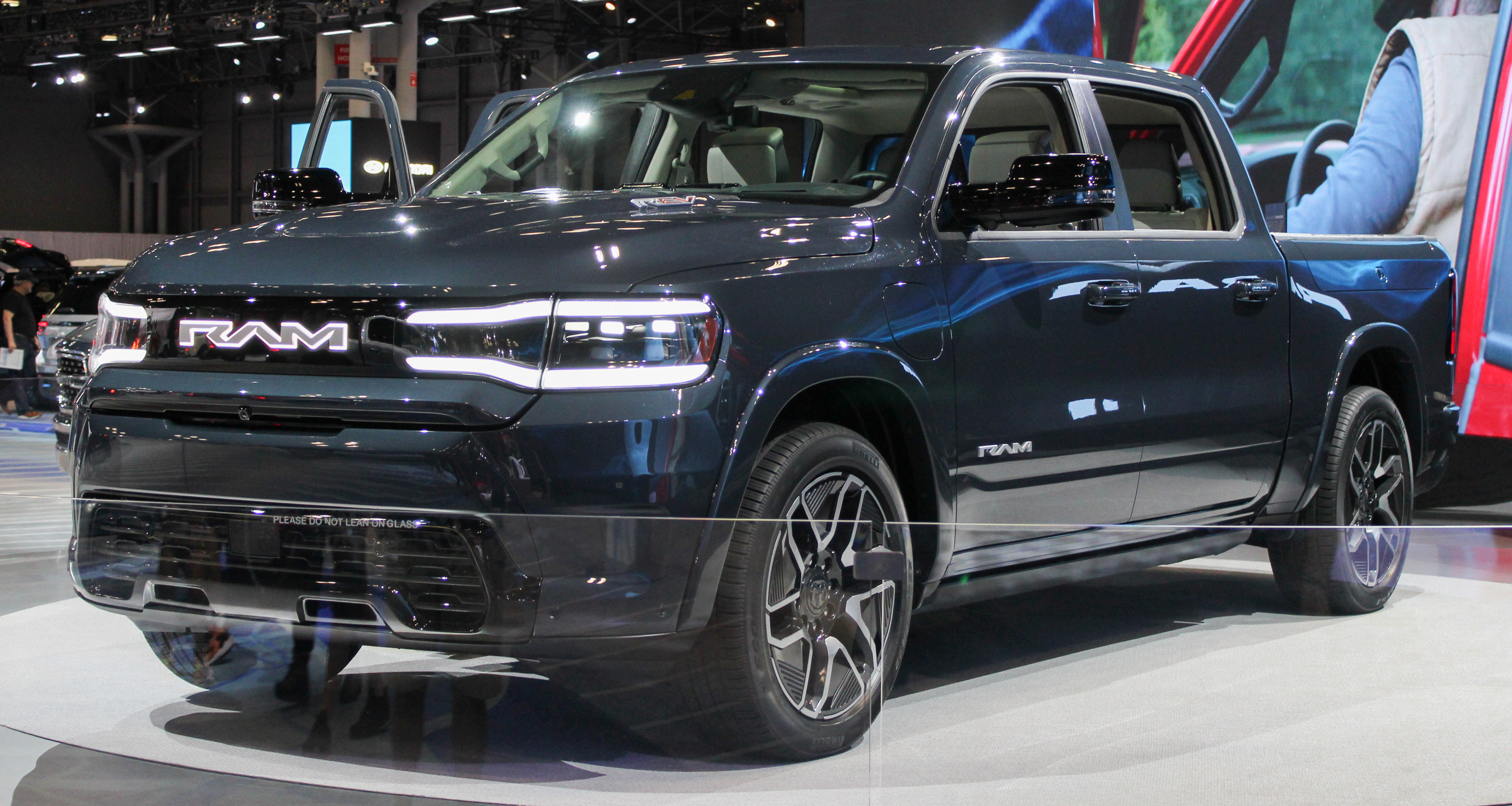
Ram 1500 REV Concept

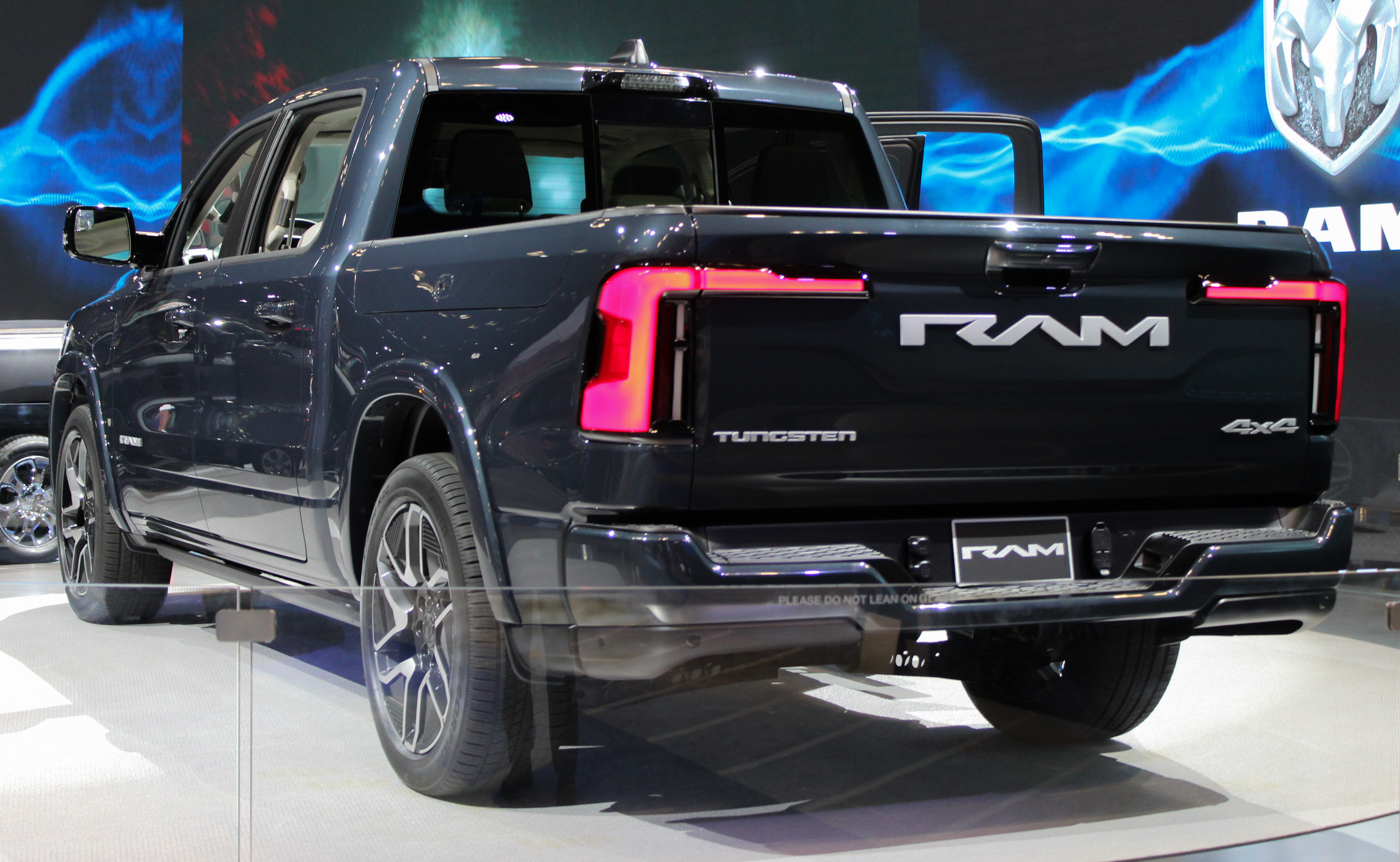
Rear view
