= EcoDiesel =

Type of diesel engine

The EcoDiesel is a diesel engine used in Ram Trucks and Jeep vehicles from 2014 to 2023. Introduced by Fiat Chrysler Automobiles, the EcoDiesel name was used for two different engines. The first was the VM Motori L630, the North American variant of the A 630 DOHC 3.0L engine, which was used in the Ram 1500 and the Jeep Grand Cherokee. The other was a 3.0L inline-4 Iveco diesel engine used in the Ram ProMaster, the North American version of the Fiat Ducato. The ProMaster with the Iveco/EcoDiesel was available from 2014 to 2017.

EcoDiesel engines were made by VM Motori, now a wholly owned subsidiary of Stellantis, and a sister company of Ram and Jeep. Stellantis was formed in 2021 when Fiat Chrysler merged with the French PSA Group.

== History ==
=== First generation ===
The engine started as a prototype developed by VM Motori, an Italian manufacturer of diesel engines, in collaboration with General Motors—for a planned European Cadillac. However, GM's bankruptcy in 2009 cut this effort short. GM owned half of VM Motori from 2007 to 2013.

In February 2011, Fiat bought 50% of VM Motori from Penske. GM retained its 50% of VM Motori.

The engine was first offered in some non-U.S. markets starting in 2011. That summer Chrysler Australia released a Jeep Grand Cherokee with the VM Motori 3.0L V6. The summer of 2011 was also when Fiat bought a controlling share of Chrysler from the U.S. Treasury, before buying the remaining shares from VEBA in January 2014.

In 2012, the engine became available in Europe in the Chrysler 300C and the Lancia Thema.

Fiat made VM Motori a wholly owned subsidiary in 2013 when GM was ready to fully divest its stake. At that same time, Fiat was developing the engine for Ram and Jeep vehicles in North America.

In 2014, Dave Leone, GM's chief engineer of performance cars, said of the EcoDiesel, "That engine was in Cadillac CTS and SRX prototypes I drove here in Europe, [Fiat] picked it up for pennies on the dollar."

=== Second generation ===
While called the second generation, they were the first of their kind to hit the market in the U.S. and Canada and the first to use the EcoDiesel name. It was the VM Motori L630.

Ram released the EcoDiesel in March 2014 in its 1500 pickups. From 2014 to 2019, this generation of the EcoDiesel was optional in the Ram 1500 and the Jeep Grand Cherokee.

The Ram 1500 with EcoDiesel was the first half-ton pickup with a diesel engine available in the U.S since Dodge had previously offered a six-cylinder Mitsubishi diesel in its half-ton pickup for 1978, and GM offered diesel engines from 1978 to 1998. Other diesel pickup trucks that have been available for decades are heavier-duty trucks.

==== Key specs, Ram 1500 application ====
- 3.0L V6
- 240 hp (180 kW) @ 3,600 RPM
- 420 lb⋅ft (570 N⋅m) torque @ 2,000 RPM
- 13,070 Towing Capacity
- ZF 8HP70 eight-speed automatic transmission
- Fuel economy: 20 US gal (76 L; 17 imp gal) city, 28 US gal (110 L; 23 imp gal) highway (varies based on vehicle and engine tune)

=== Regulatory issues ===
In late 2015, diesels in the U.S. came under intense regulatory scrutiny as a result of the Volkswagen emissions scandal—including the EcoDiesel. The EPA broadened its investigations into 28 diesel-powered models made by BMW, Stellantis, General Motors, Jaguar Land Rover, and Mercedes-Benz.

In January 2017, the EPA and California regulators issued a "Notice of Violation" against Fiat Chrysler Automobiles (FCA), Ram's parent corporation, citing violations of the Clean Air Act due to changes to vehicle software allowing excessive (and illegal) levels of nitrogen oxides into the air. That same month, FCA CEO Sergio Marchionne disputed "any resemblance to Volkswagen's Dieselgate scandal because nothing in FCA's diesel calibration distinguishes between a test cycle and normal driving conditions," which was the case with Volkswagen. "This is a huge difference because there has never been an intention on the part of FCA to create conditions that are designed to defeat the testing process," Marchionne said.

Fiat Chrysler put the 2017s on stop-sale and they had been updated prior to being released, so this issue did not impact model years 2017–2019.

In January 2019, Fiat Chrysler settled with the U.S. Justice Department on behalf of the EPA and the state of California. This settlement applied to more than 100,000 2014–2016 model year vehicles. The settlement required Fiat Chrysler to repair at least 85% of the vehicles within two years or face additional penalties. This led to payments ranging from $2,450 to $3,075 for current owners and payments of $990 to former owners and eligible lessees and former lessees. To receive the payment, current owners and lessees had to have a software update to their engine tune that resolved the issue. The software update created new performance issues, including lower fuel economy and loss of engine power, which Fiat Chrysler attempted to resolve with additional later updates.

For owners, the EcoDiesel case played out much differently than Volkswagen's situation with its TDI diesel engines. In the U.S., Volkswagen had to buy back most of the vehicles under the terms of its 2016 settlement with the government, while Fiat Chrysler was able to repair all of theirs and no buybacks were offered.

=== Maserati with EcoDiesel ===
In 2014, the Maserati Ghibli and the Maserati Quattroporte were both released in Italy with the VM Motori engine used by Ram and Jeep. It was not branded as an EcoDiesel but it was the same engine. According to Motor Trend, this was the first diesel Maserati in many years.

"We're betting that a bunch of diesel Ram owners will be using their bragging rights to point out, 'Same engine as in a Maserati, y'know,' " wrote auto journalist John Voelcker.

=== Third generation ===
In June 2019, Fiat Chrysler announced a new generation of the EcoDiesel for the Ram 1500 beginning in 2020. This updated engine was also available in the Jeep Wrangler and Jeep Gladiator.

The third generation of the EcoDiesel was a complete redesign of the engine. Among the 80% of its parts that Fiat Chrysler claimed were new included a turbocharger, aluminum cylinder heads with revised intake ports, and an upgraded combustion system. Its new, high- and low-pressure exhaust gas recirculation system reduced power loss from the turbocharger. Horsepower was improved 8% over the previous generation and torque was improved by 14%. A properly equipped Ram 1500 with the updated EcoDiesel had a payload capacity of 2,040 pounds and could tow up to 12,560 pounds.

==== Key specs, 2023 Ram 1500 application ====
- 3.0L V6
- 260 hp (190 kW) @ 3,600 RPM
- 480 lb⋅ft (650 N⋅m) @ 2,000 RPM
- ZF 8HP75 eight-speed automatic transmission
- Fuel economy (MPG): 22 city, 29 highway, 24 combined (varies based on vehicle and engine tune)

=== Discontinuation ===
In mid-September 2022, Ram announced that the EcoDiesel would end production in January 2023, making the 2023 model year the last year for that application of the engine. At the time of the announcement, Ram executives emphasized that the future was in electric trucks.
