= Peugeot Hoggar =

Peugeot Hoggar may refer to:

- Peugeot Hoggar (coupé utility)
- Peugeot Hoggar (concept)
