= Peugeot Landtrek =

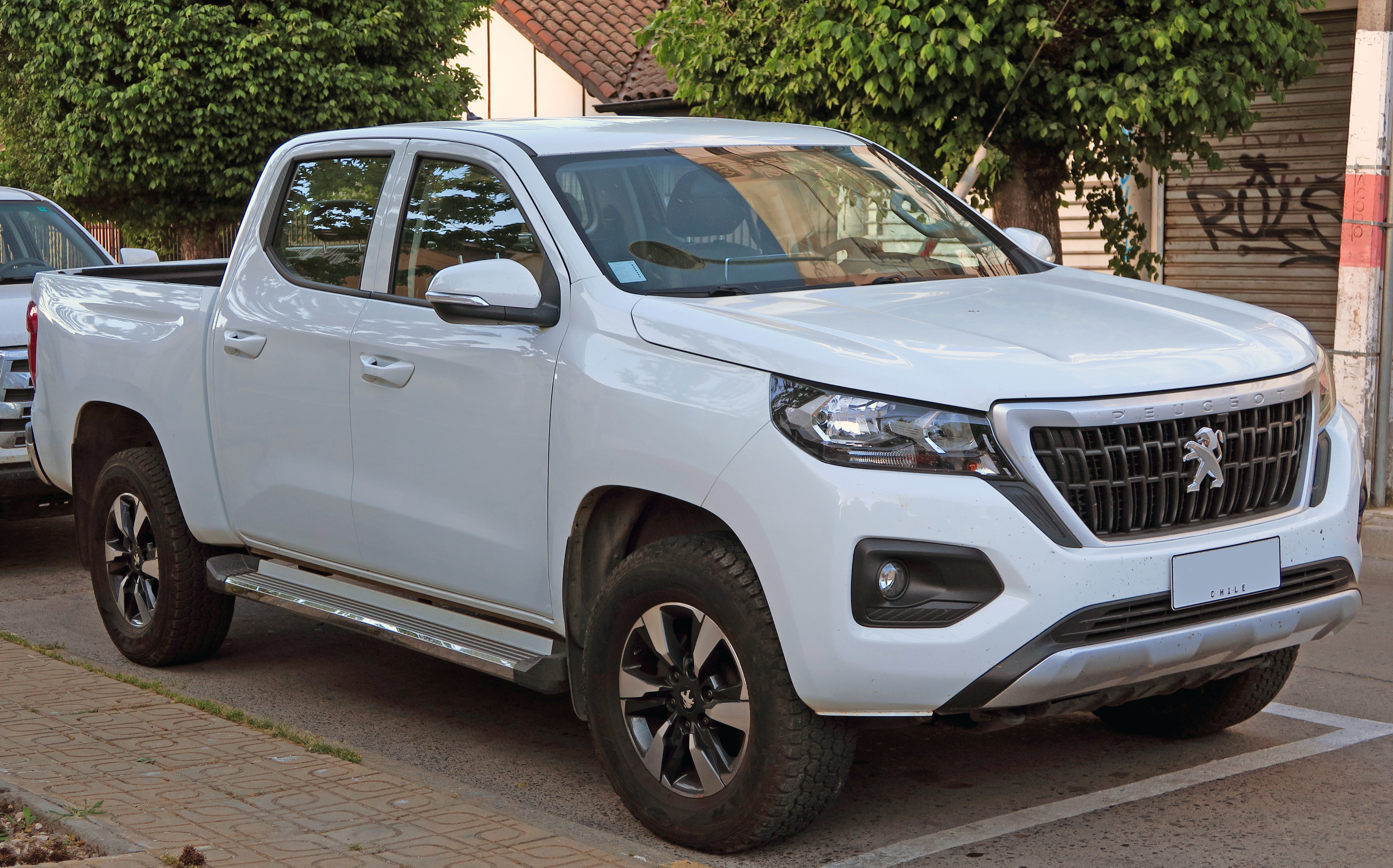

Overview
- Manufacturer: PSA Group (2020–2021); Stellantis (2021–present)
- Also called: Fiat Titano (South America and Algeria, 2023–present); Ram 1200 (Mexico, 2024–present); Ram Dakota (Argentina and Brazil, 2025–present); Changan F70; Changan Hunter
- Production: 2020–present (China); 2021–present (Tunisia); 2022–present (Ghana, Nigeria); 2023–present (Kenya, Uruguay); 2024–present (Malaysia); 2025–present (Argentina)
- Assembly: China: Shenzhen (Shenzhen Baoneng Motor); Tunisia: Tunis (STAFIM); Ghana: Tema (Silver Star Auto); Nigeria: Kaduna (Dangote Peugeot Automobiles Nigeria Limited (DPAN)); Uruguay: Montevideo (Nordex S.A.); Malaysia: Gurun, Kedah (NAZA); Argentina: Ferreyra, Córdoba (Stellantis Argentina)

Body and chassis
- Class: Mid-size pickup truck
- Body style: 2-door regular cab; 4-door crew cab
- Layout: Front-engine, rear-wheel-drive; Front-engine, four-wheel-drive
- Chassis: Body-on-frame

Powertrain
- Engine: Petrol: 2.4 L 4K22D4T turbo I4; Diesel: 1.9 L D20TCIE turbo I4; 2.2 L DW12 HDi turbo I4; 2.2 L Multijet turbo I4
- Transmission: 6-speed manual; 6/8-speed automatic

Dimensions
- Wheelbase: 3,180 mm (125.2 in)
- Length: 5,390 mm (212.2 in) (single cab); 5,330 mm (209.8 in) (double cab)
- Width: 1,920 mm (75.6 in)
- Height: 1,819 mm (71.6 in)

Chronology
- Predecessor: Peugeot Pick Up; Fiat Fullback / Ram 1200

The Peugeot Landtrek is a mid-size pickup truck marketed by French car manufacturer Peugeot, part of Stellantis (previously PSA Group) since 2020. Jointly developed with Chinese car manufacturer Changan Automobile and manufactured in Shenzhen by Shenzhen Baoneng Motor (previously Changan PSA), the Landtrek shares the same platform and most of the bodywork with the Changan F70.

The Landtrek is not available for sale in Europe, as it is currently only sold in Latin America, Sub-Saharan Africa, Overseas France (New Caledonia), Malaysia, Laos and in Ukraine. In South America and Algeria, it is sold under the Fiat brand as the Fiat Titano. In Mexico, it is also sold under the Ram brand since 2024, as the Ram 1200. It has also been sold in South America as the Ram Dakota since 2025.

== Overview ==
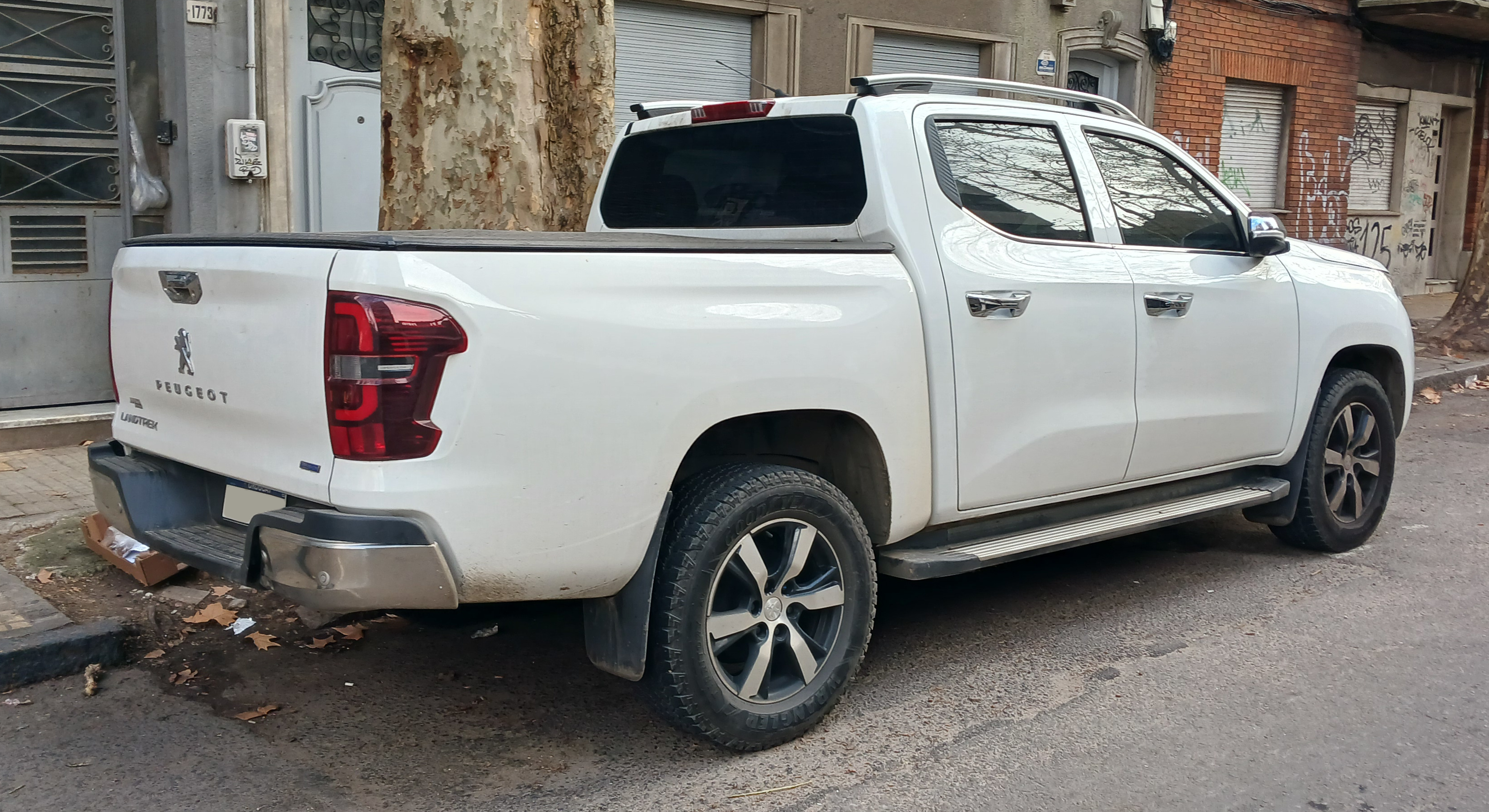
Rear view

Peugeot announced the Landtrek globally in February 2020, a replacement for the Dongfeng-based Peugeot Pick Up. The Landtrek is intended for emerging markets such as African and Latin American markets, it is available in chassis cab, single-cab and double-cab body styles, and in petrol and diesel-powered versions. According to Peugeot, the vehicle has undergone more than two million kilometres of testing in all weather conditions and terrain to ensure its versatility, off-road capabilities and ease of repair.

Depending on the version, the Landtrek has a maximum ground clearance of 235 mm (9.3 in), approach and departure angles of 29/30 and 27/26 degrees respectively, and 600 mm (24 in) wading depth. It also has a 3.5 tonnes (7,716 lb) towing capacity.

The payload exceeds 1 tonne (2,205 lb), and some versions can reach 1.2 tonnes (2,600 lb). The single cab model can be sold without the rear bumper, providing better access to the bed with the 180-degree opening tailgate. Basic models are offered with rear-wheel drive, while a 4×4 system is optional and comes equipped with 4H and 4L modes. It can also be ordered with seating for up to six in a 3+3 layout.

According to Peugeot's press release at that time, It will be marketed in many regions in two phases. In the planned first phase, the Landtrek would be sold in Mexico, Uruguay, Ecuador, Paraguay, Panama, Peru, the Dominican Republic, Guatemala, Haiti and Chile. In the second phase, it would be marketed in Argentina, Brazil and Colombia.

== Markets ==
=== Africa ===
==== Algeria ====
Sales of the Landtrek's Fiat-badged twin, the Fiat Titano, were launched in Algeria in December 2023. As of 2026, the model is available in the country as both a single and double-cab utilty vehicle (both with 4x2 driving systems), designated as the Endurance trim, or as a 4x4 double-cab, designated the Volcano trim.

==== Ghana ====
Semi knock-down local assembly of the Landtrek started in Ghana in the first half of 2022 at the Silver Star Auto assembly plant in Tema, Accra.

==== South Africa ====
The Landtrek was introduced in South Africa in November 2021 as the first right-hand drive market for the vehicle. It is only available in a double cab body style, it comes in Allure and 4Action grades, and powered by a 1.9-litre diesel engine.

=== Asia ===
==== Malaysia ====
After being previewed in early January 2023, the Landtrek was launched by Peugeot's distributor Bermaz Auto in Malaysia in March 2023 as an imported model from China. It was offered in a sole Allure grade, powered by the 1.9-litre turbocharged diesel engine. The SE (Special Edition) grade was added in May 2024.

==== Laos ====
The Landtrek was launched in Laos in May 2023. It is only available as a double-cab body style with a 1.9-litre turbo-diesel (4x2 and 4x4), 150 PS (148 hp; 110 kW), and a 6-speed manual transmission gearbox.

=== Latin America ===
==== Argentina ====
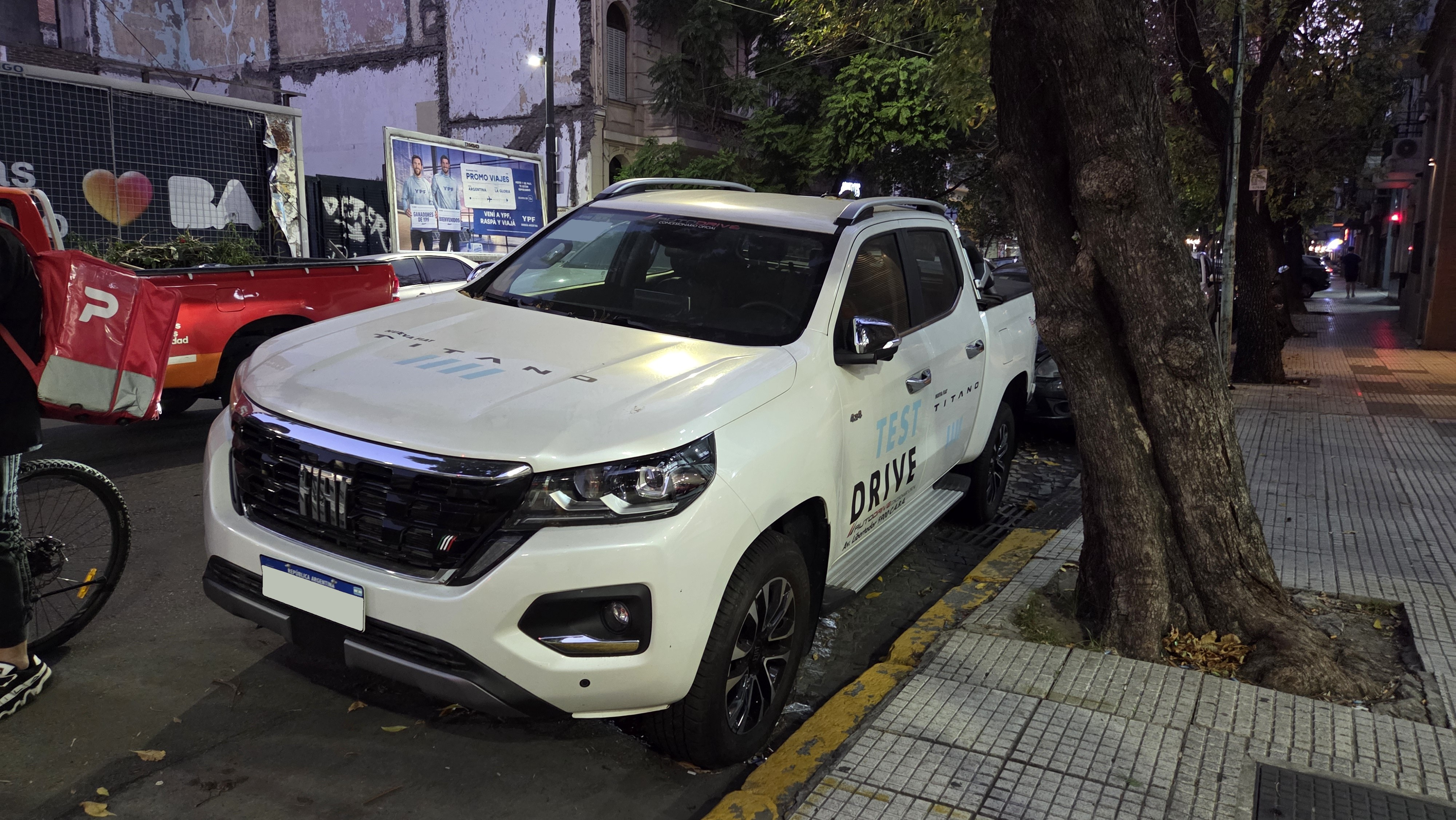
Fiat Titano 2025 in Buenos Aires, Argentina

Full production of the models Fiat Titano and RAM Dakota, started at Stellantis Córdoba in May 2025, which introduced a 200 PS (197 hp; 147 kW) 2.2 L Multijet II and an eight-speed automatic.

==== Brazil ====
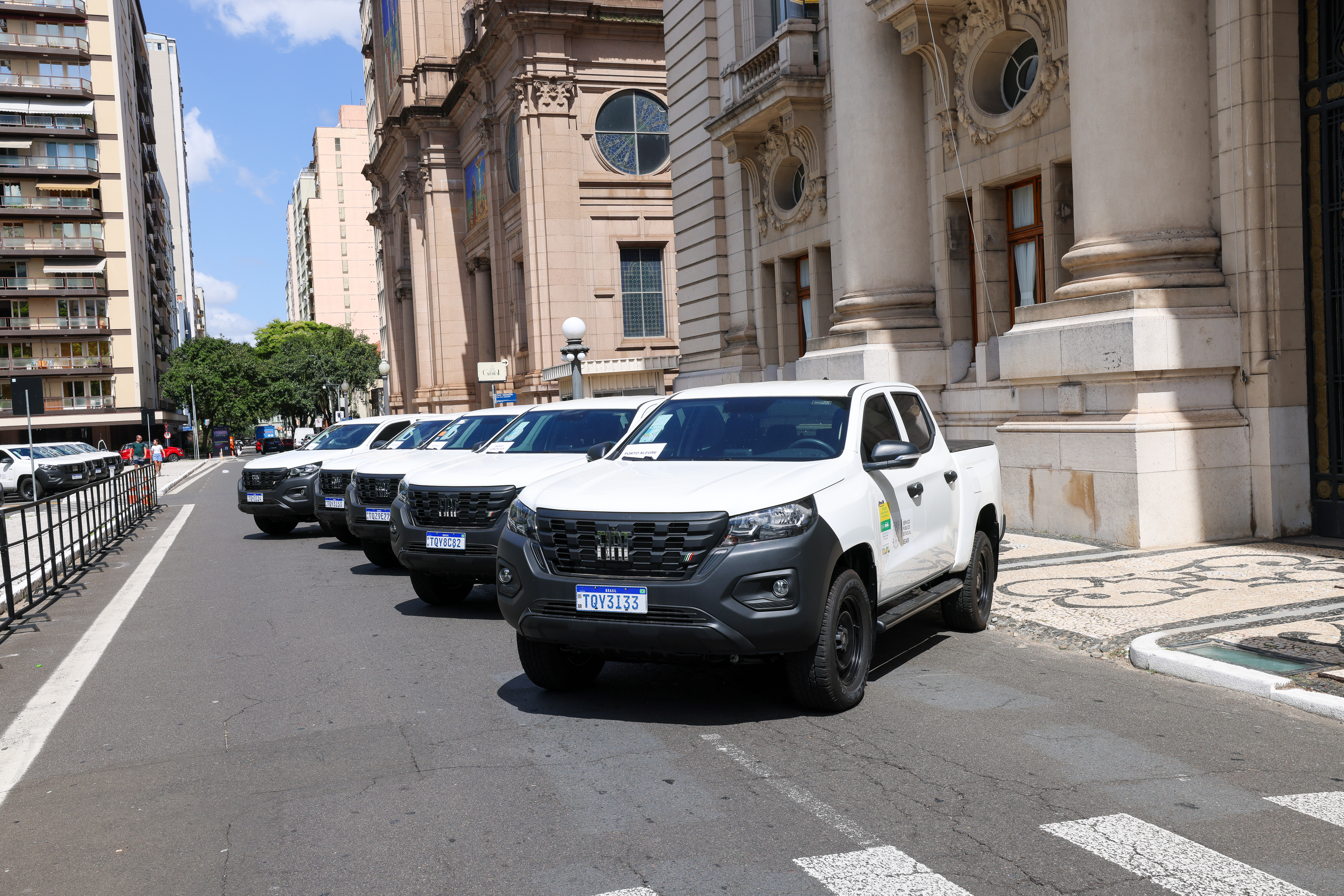
Fiat Titano pickup trucks in Brazil

The Landtrek was planned to be launched in Brazil in 2023. However, after the merge and foundation of Stellantis, the company decided that the pickup truck would be sold under the Fiat brand. In May 2023, the name was announced as the Fiat Titano, and it went on sale in March 2024 as an imported model from Uruguay.

==== Mexico ====
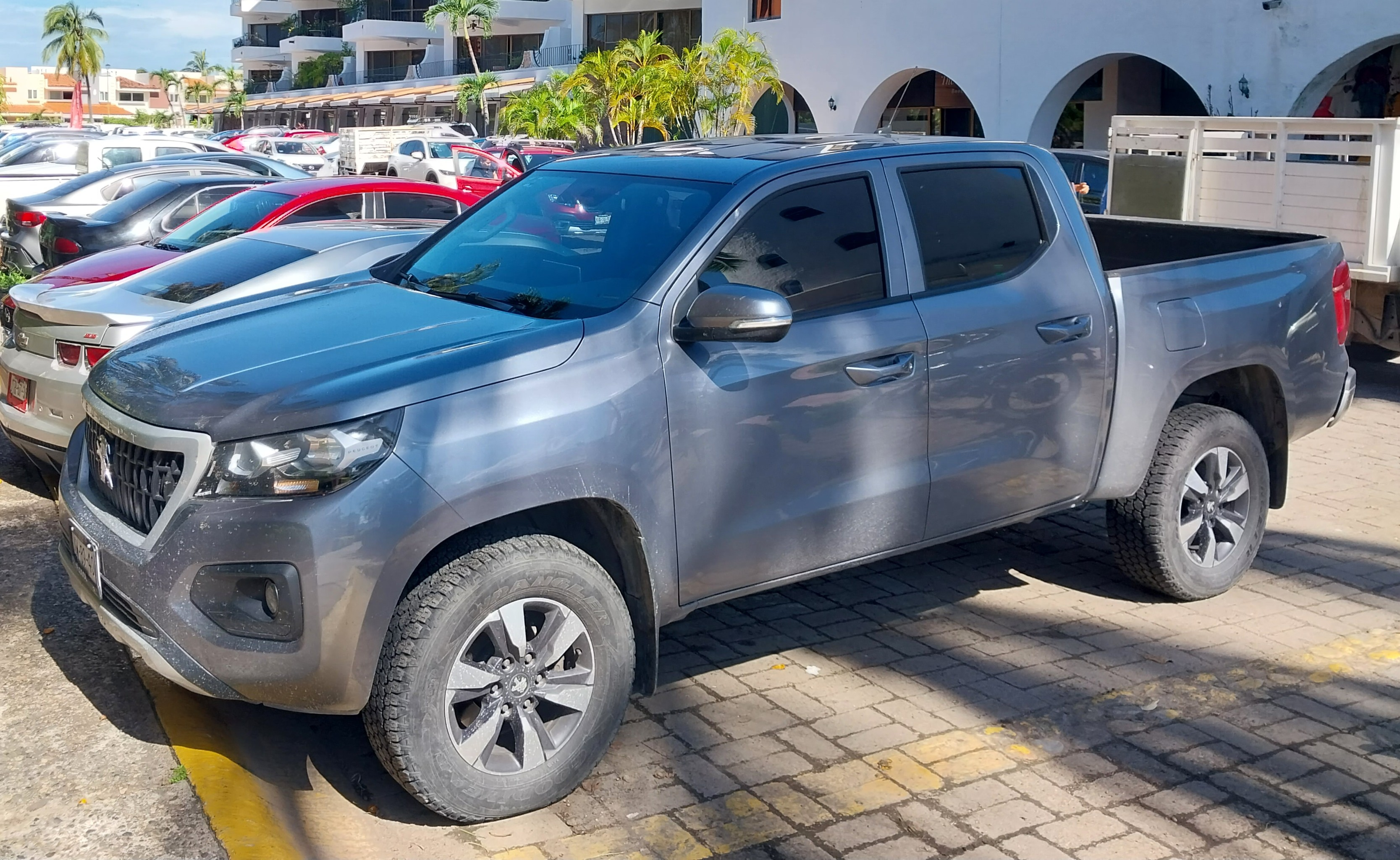
Peugeot Landtrek in Puerto Vallarta, Jalisco

Mexico was the first Latin American market of the Landtrek. Introduced in November 2020 for the 2021 model year, the Mexican market Landtrek was available with the 2.4-litre turbocharged petrol and the 1.9-litre turbo-diesel. As of March 2024 it is no longer available in Mexico.

==== Uruguay ====
The Landtrek went on sale in late June 2021 as an imported model from China. Engine options are 2.4-litre turbocharged petrol (4x2) and 1.9-litre turbo-diesel (4x2 and 4x4). The locally assembled Landtrek was available since mid-2023; the engine range sees the addition of the 2.2 HDi four-cylinder diesel DW12 (2179 cc) PSA, delivering 180 PS (178 hp; 132 kW) and paired with a six-speed manual or six-speed automatic transmission. This engine will also be mounted on the twin Fiat Titano.

In December 2024, the new MY2025 range was announced, featuring the introduction of the new 2.2 Multijet Evo diesel engine (2184 cc) Fiat, produced in Pratola Serra (AV), which replaces the previous 2.2 HDI PSA engine. The new 2.2 Multijet delivers 200 PS (197 hp; 147 kW) and is paired with a six-speed manual or eight-speed automatic transmission.

=== Europe ===
==== Ukraine ====
The Landtrek went on sale in Ukraine in March 2023. It is only available as a double-cab body style with a 1.9-litre turbo-diesel (4x2 and 4x4), 150 PS (148 hp; 110 kW) and a 6-speed manual transmission gearbox.

== Powertrain ==
During its introduction, the Landtrek is available as a two- and four-wheel drive vehicle. Engine options include a 1.9-litre VGT diesel produced by Kunming Yunnei in China, producing 150 PS (148 hp; 110 kW) and 350 N⋅m (35.7 kg⋅m; 258 lb⋅ft) of torque. It is paired with a six-speed Getrag manual gearbox or a 6-speed automatic. Another option is the 2.4-litre turbocharged petrol engine 4K22D4T produced by Shenyang Mitsubishi in China. It is rated at 210 PS (207 hp; 154 kW) and 320 N⋅m (32.6 kg⋅m; 236 lb⋅ft), with either a 6-speed Getrag manual or a 6-speed Punch automatic with sequential, Sport and Eco modes.

The Uruguay-made Landtrek was available since mid-2023 with a new engine option, a 2.2-litre HDi DW12 turbo-diesel engine producing 180 PS (178 hp; 132 kW) and 400 N⋅m (40.8 kg⋅m; 295 lb⋅ft) of torque. The engine is shared with the Fiat Ducato. The Brazilian market Fiat Titano became available in March 2024 with the same 2.2 HDi engine. For the 2.2-litre model, the engineering team adjusted the pickup's entire suspension system for durability and off-road use.

In December 2024, Stellantis announced a new engine for the model, a 2.2 Multijet Evo (2,184 cc) Fiat engine producing 200 PS (197 hp; 147 kW) and 450 N⋅m (45.9 kg⋅m; 332 lb⋅ft) of torque.

Type	Model	Displacement	Power	Torque	Transmission	Layout	Calendar years
Petrol	Shenyang Mitsubishi 2.4 4K22D4T	2,398 cc (2.4 L) turbocharged I4	210 PS (207 hp; 154 kW) @ 5,600 rpm	320 N⋅m (32.6 kg⋅m; 236 lb⋅ft) @ 2,000–4,000 rpm	6-speed Getrag 6MTI380 manual; 6-speed automatic	RWD	2020–present
Diesel	Kunming Yunnei 1.9 D20TCIE	1,910 cc (1.9 L) turbocharged I4	150 PS (148 hp; 110 kW) @ 4,000 rpm	350 N⋅m (35.7 kg⋅m; 258 lb⋅ft) @ 1,800–2,800 rpm	6-speed Getrag 6MTI380 manual; 6-speed automatic	RWD; 4WD	2020–present
Diesel	Stellantis 2.2 PSA DW12	2,179 cc (2.2 L) turbocharged I4	180 PS (178 hp; 132 kW) @ 3,750 rpm	370 N⋅m (37.7 kg⋅m; 273 lb⋅ft) @ 2,000 rpm	6-speed manual	4WD	2023–2025
Diesel	Stellantis 2.2 PSA DW12	2,179 cc (2.2 L) turbocharged I4	180 PS (178 hp; 132 kW) @ 3,750 rpm	400 N⋅m (40.8 kg⋅m; 295 lb⋅ft) @ 2,000 rpm	6-speed automatic	4WD	2023–2025
Diesel	Stellantis FIAT 2.2 Multijet	2,184 cc (2.2 L) turbocharged I4	200 PS (197 hp; 147 kW) @ 3,750 rpm	450 N⋅m (45.9 kg⋅m; 332 lb⋅ft) @ 2,000 rpm	6-speed manual 8-speed automatic	4WD	2025–present

== Sales ==
Year	Peugeot Landtrek		
Year	Mexico	Uruguay	South Africa
2020	112		
2021	862	55	
2022	462	57	426
2023	102	43	343
2024		79	
2025		31	

Year	Fiat Titano
Year	Brazil
2024	6,222
2025	6,437

Year	Ram 1200/Dakota
Year	Mexico
2025	13,199
