= Dongfeng Rich =

The Dongfeng Rich (锐骐) is a series of compact pickup trucks (first and second generation) and mid-size pickup trucks (Rich 6 & 7) produced by the Dongfeng Nissan joint venture of Chinese auto manufacturer Dongfeng Motor Corporation.

== First generation ==
Dongfeng Rich
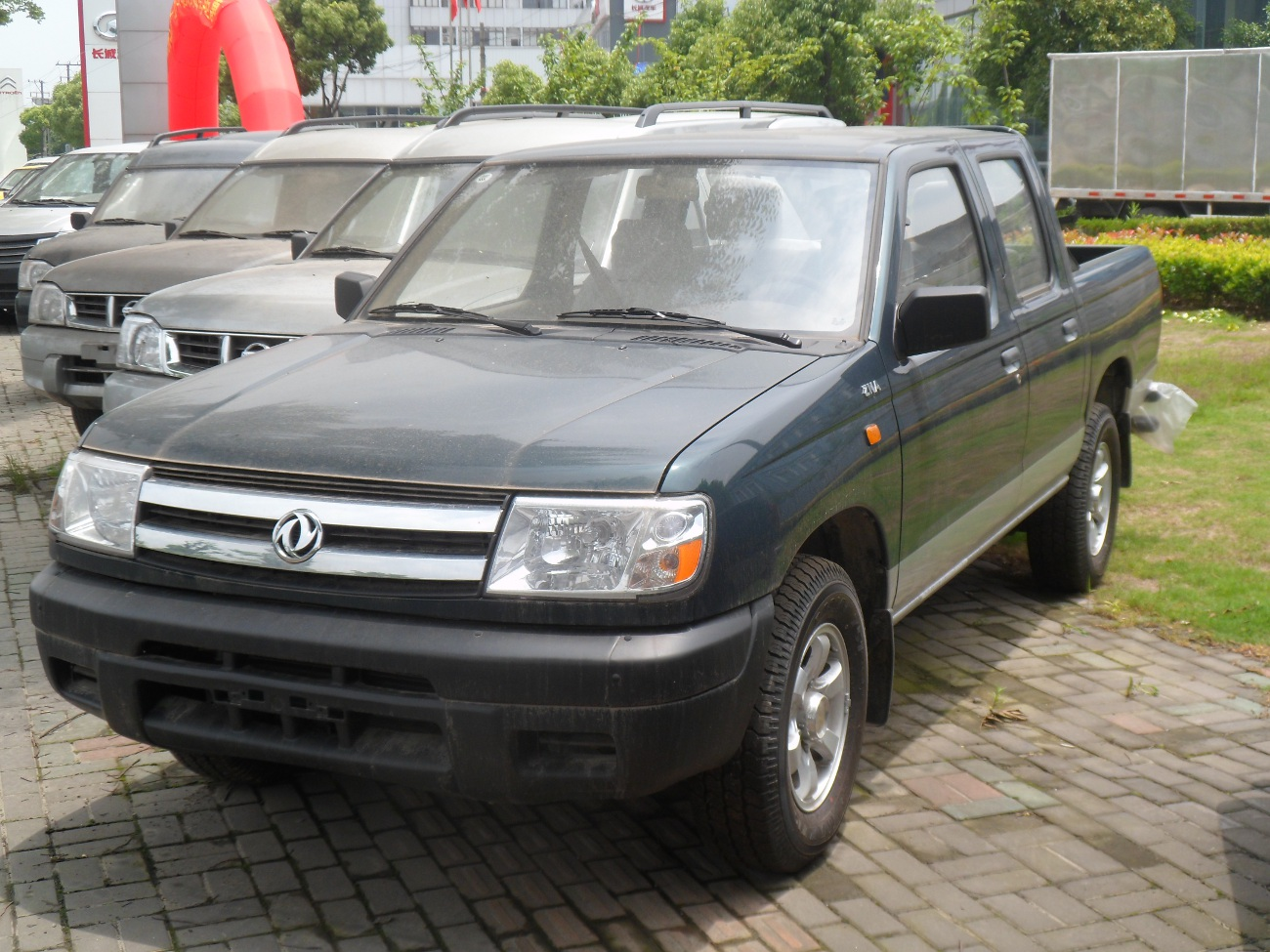

Overview
- Also called: Dongfeng Oting (SUV)
- Production: 1999–2014
- Assembly: Zhengzhou, Henan (Zhengzhou Nissan)

Body and chassis
- Class: Compact pickup truck
- Layout: Front-engine rear-wheel drive / Four-wheel drive
- Related: Dongfeng Oting; Nissan Xterra; Nissan Navara; Nissan Patrol

Powertrain
- Engine: Petrol ZG24 2.4L (2438cc); Diesel ZD25TCI turbo 2.5L (2498cc); Diesel ZD30D13-4N2 turbo 3.0L (2953cc)
- Transmission: 5-speed manual

Dimensions
- Wheelbase: 3,050 mm (120.1 in)
- Length: 5,080 mm (200.0 in)
- Width: 2WD: 1,820 mm (71.7 in); 4WD: 1,720 mm (67.7 in)
- Height: 2WD: 1,680 mm (66.1 in); 4WD: 1,715 mm (67.5 in)

The first generation Dongfeng Rich is a pickup truck and a SUV based on the design of the Nissan D22 pickup truck due to the Dongfeng-Nissan joint venture using the Nissan F-Alpha platform. It is produced as a pickup and an SUV, which is essentially the pickup with a long roof bed cover. The diesel version is powered by a 2.5-liter turbo diesel engine mated to a 6-speed manual gearbox, producing a maximum output of 140 hp (104 kW) and 305 N⋅m (225 lb⋅ft) of torque. The petrol version is powered by a 2.4-liter gasoline engine, producing a maximum output of 139 hp (104 kW) and 217 N⋅m (160 lb⋅ft) of torque mated to a 5-speed manual gearbox.

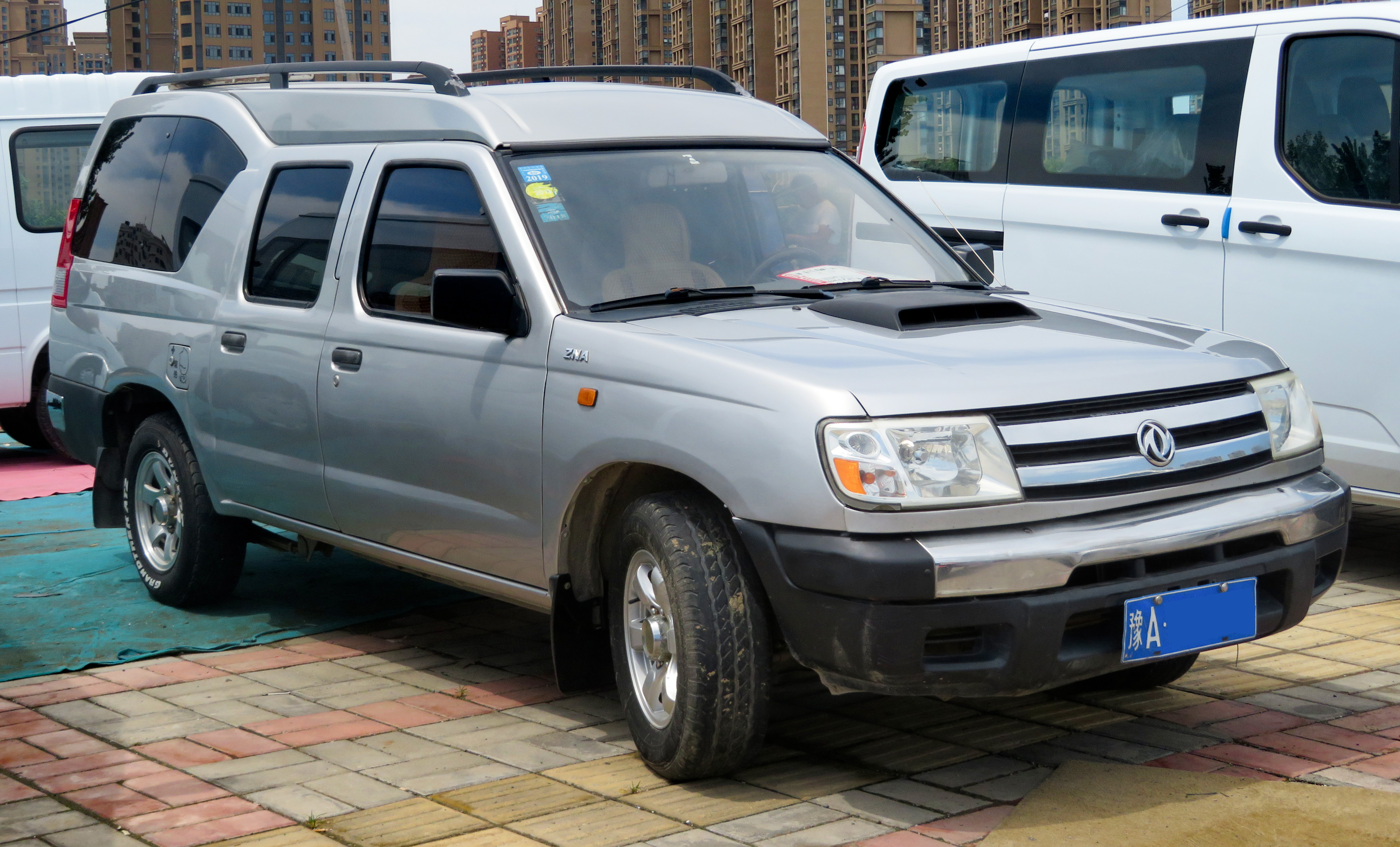
Dongfeng Rich SUV.

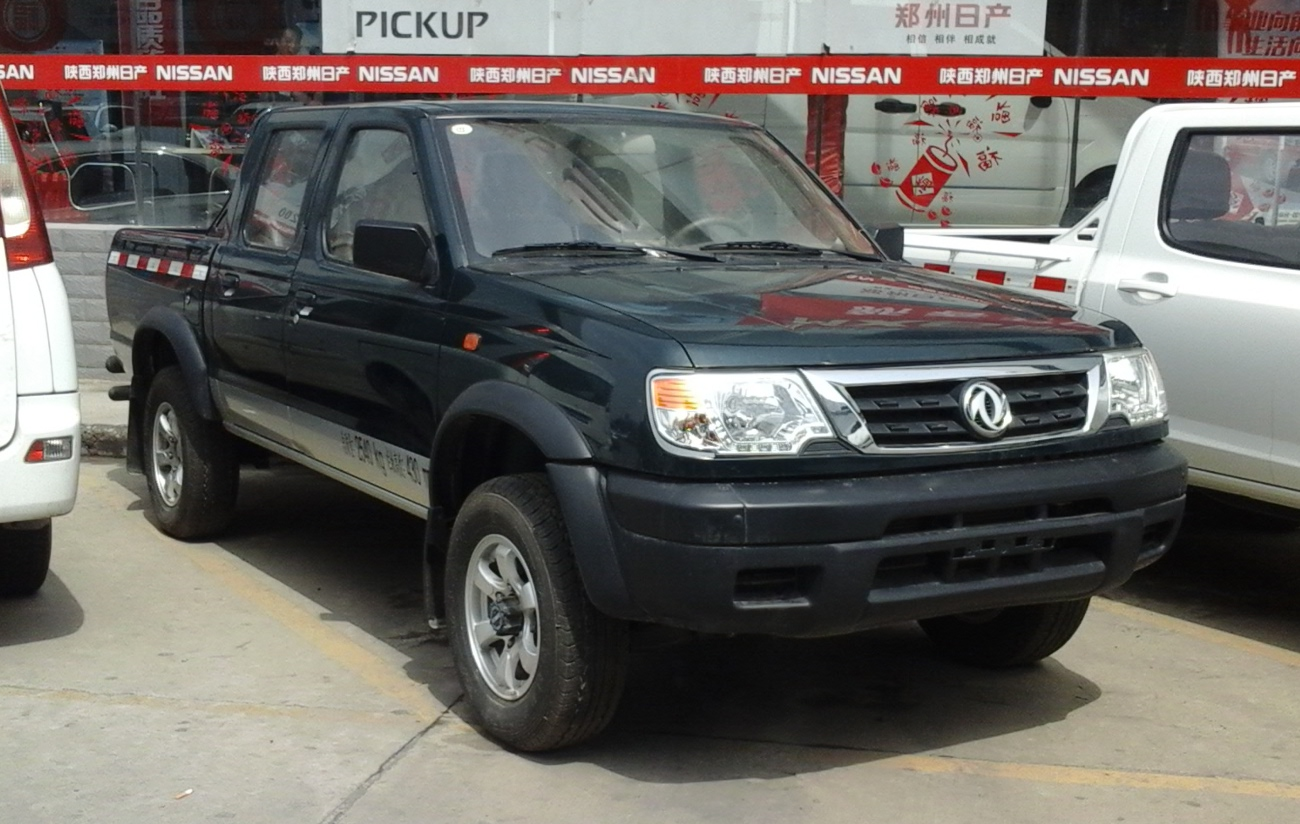
Dongfeng Rich first generation facelift.

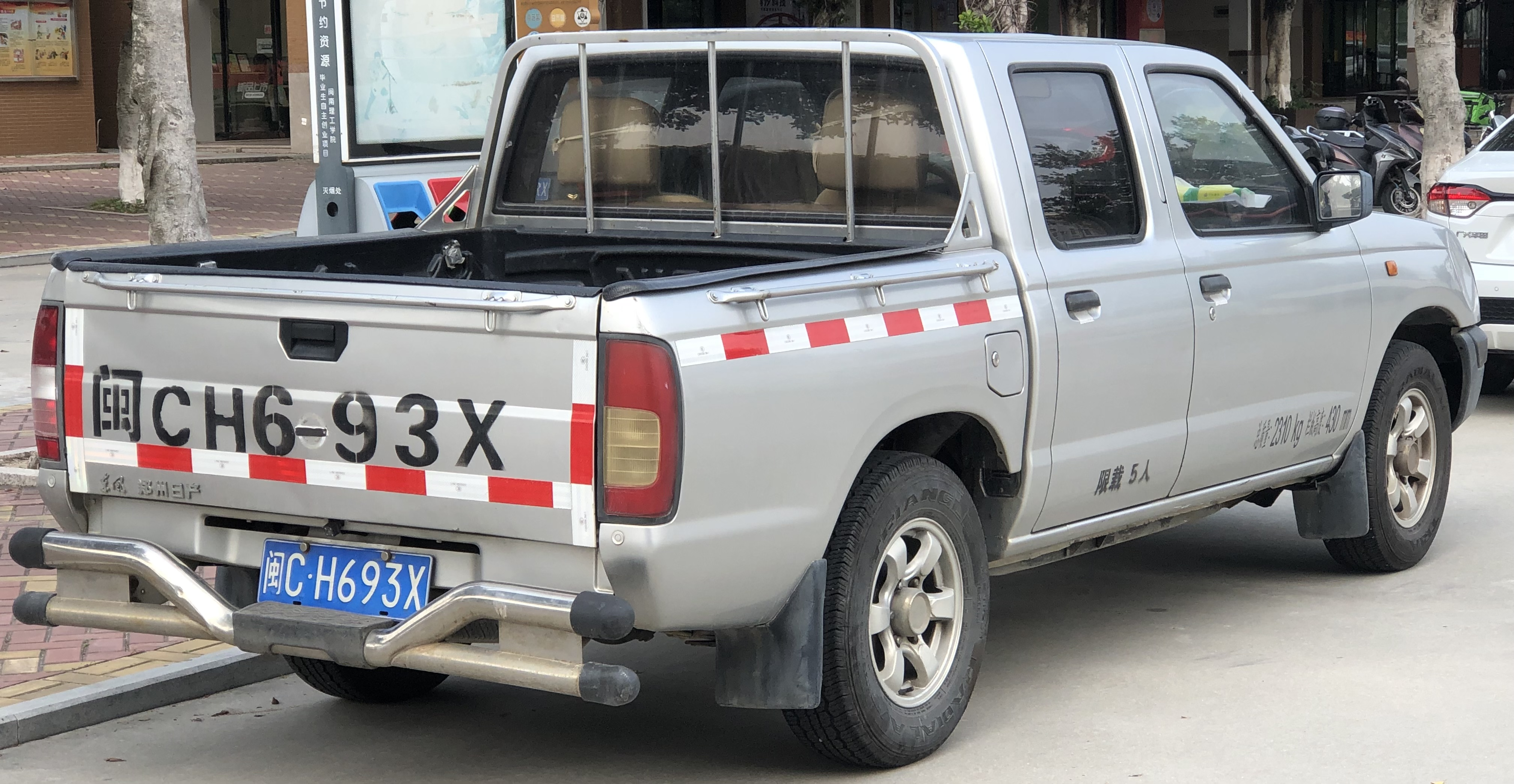
Dongfeng Rich first generation facelift rear.

== Second generation ==
Dongfeng Rich
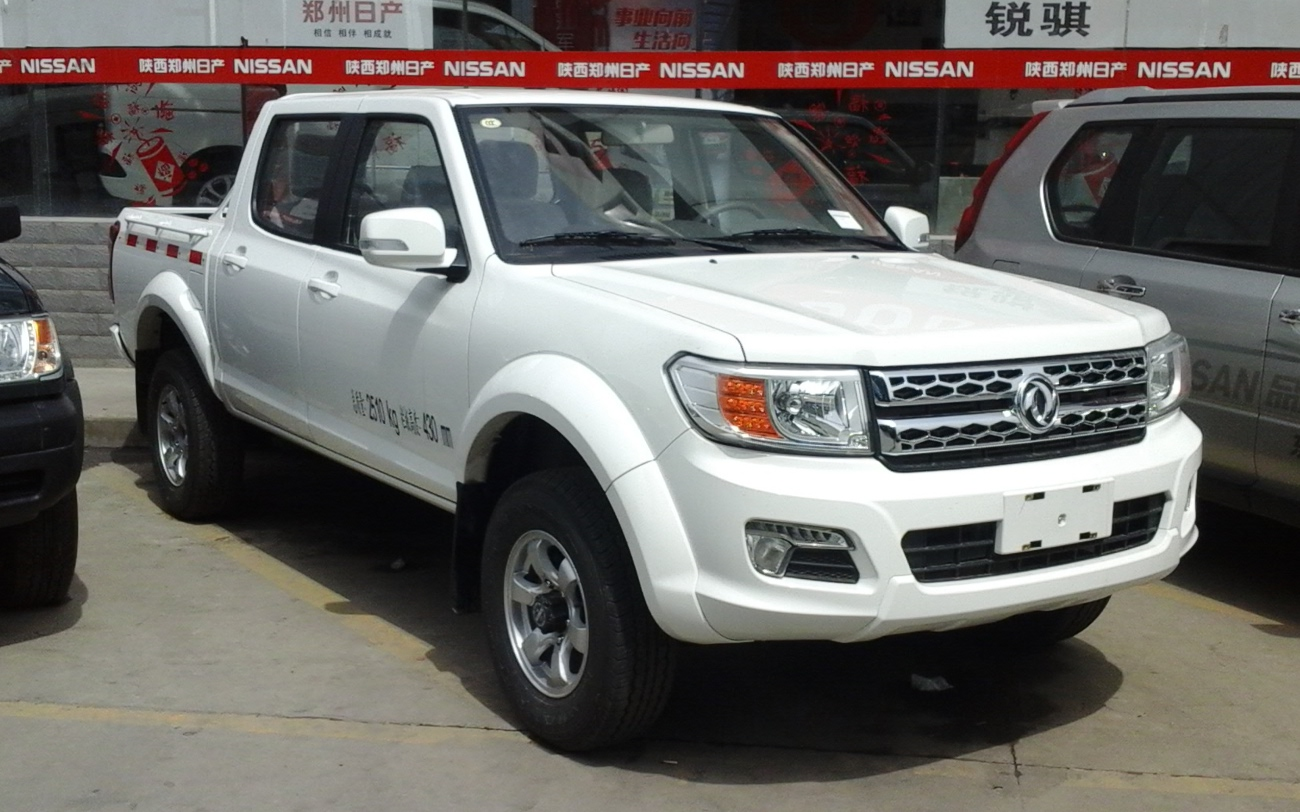

Overview
- Also called: Dongfeng Oting (SUV); Peugeot Pick Up (Africa)
- Production: 2014–present
- Model years: 2015–present
- Assembly: PRC: Zhengzhou, Henan (Zhengzhou Nissan); Tunisia: Fouchana, Ben Arous (STAFIM as Peugeot Pick Up)

Body and chassis
- Class: Compact pickup truck
- Layout: Front-engine rear-wheel drive / Four-wheel drive
- Related: Dongfeng Oting; Nissan Xterra; Nissan Navara; Nissan Patrol; Peugeot Pick Up

Powertrain
- Engine: Petrol: 2.4L Nissan ZG24 I4; 2.4L Xinchen 2TZH CNG I4; Diesel: 2.4L Yuchai YCY24165-61 turbo; 2.5L Nissan ZD25TCI turbo; 3.0L Nissan ZD30D13-4N2 turbo
- Transmission: 5-speed manual

Dimensions
- Wheelbase: 3,050 mm (120.1 in)
- Length: 5,080 mm (200.0 in)
- Width: 2WD: 1,820 mm (71.7 in); 4WD: 1,720 mm (67.7 in)
- Height: 2WD: 1,680 mm (66.1 in); 4WD: 1,715 mm (67.5 in)

Chronology
- Predecessor: Peugeot Hoggar (Peugeot Pick Up)
- Successor: Peugeot Landtrek (Peugeot Pick Up)

The second generation Rich pickup is also based on the same Nissan platform as the first generation Rich with the powertrain also being carried over, and was later rebadged as a Peugeot in some markets. The second generation Rich was launched in December 2014 with the front and rear end of the truck completely restyled and the interior updated. An update was launched in March 2017 to fulfill the National V emissions standard. The update features a powertrain with a 2.5-liter turbo diesel engine developing 140 hp (104 kW) and 305 N⋅m (225 lb⋅ft) of torque, which is 24 hp (18 kW) more and 25 N⋅m (18 lb⋅ft) more than the original version. The transmission is a 6-speed manual gearbox and both 2-wheel drive and 4-wheel drive variants are available.

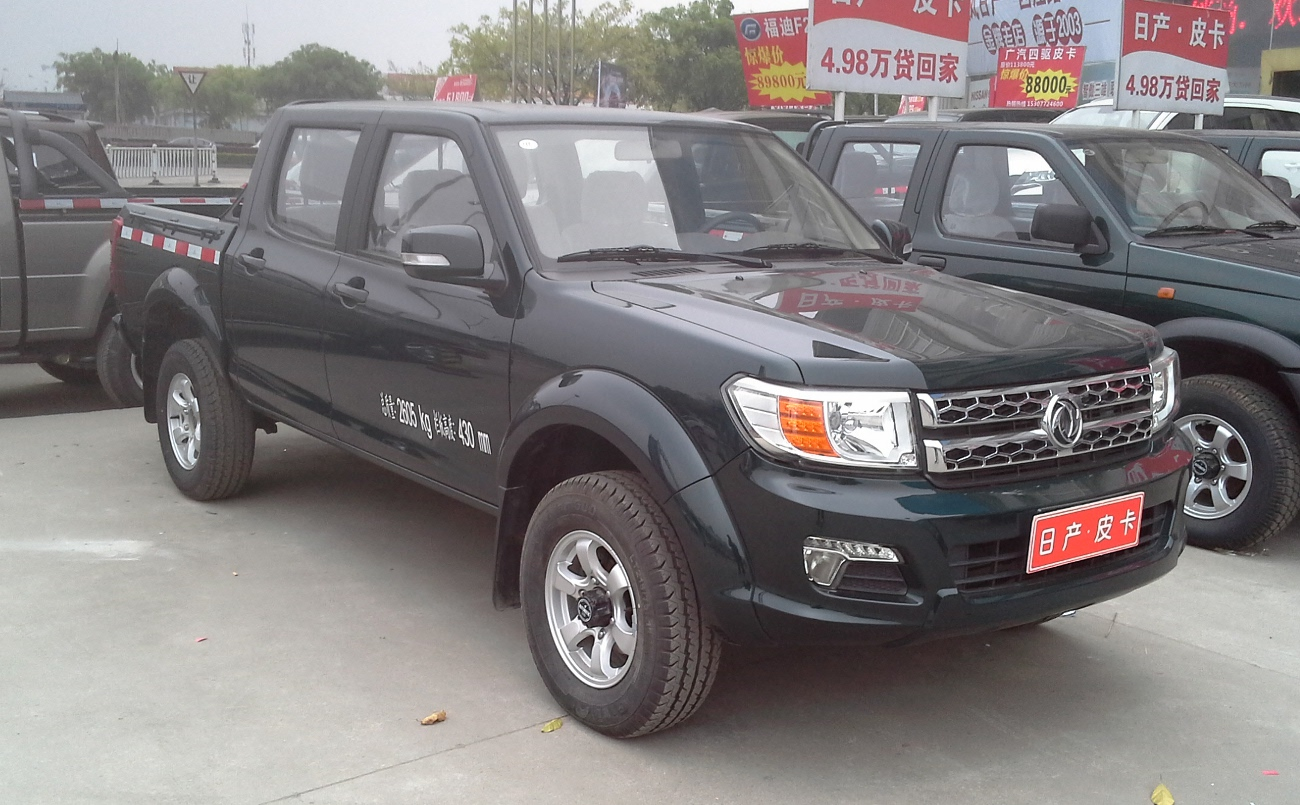
Dongfeng Rich second generation front.

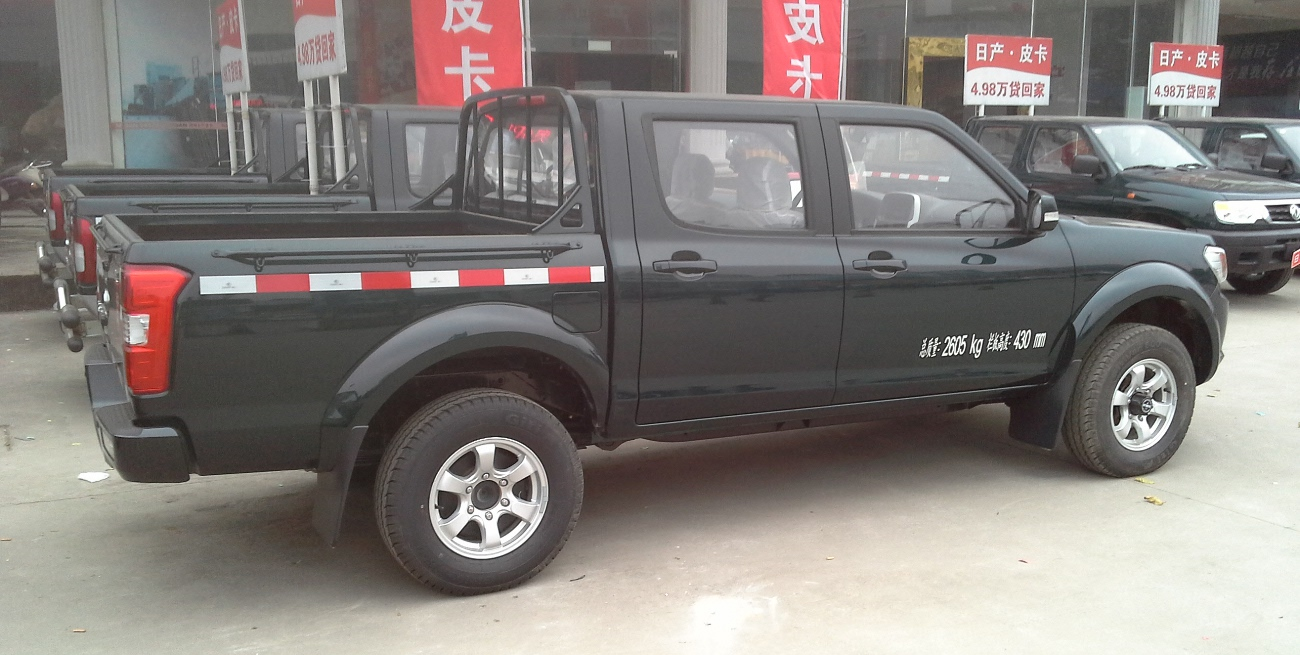
Dongfeng Rich second generation rear.

=== 2018 facelift ===
The second generation Rich received a minor update in 2018 with the powertrain remain unchanged. The interior received a complete redesign with a 7-inch touch screen as the center piece featuring Bluetooth, phone connection, tire pressure detection, reverse radar and ESP. From the 2018 model year, 4-wheel drive models are also available.

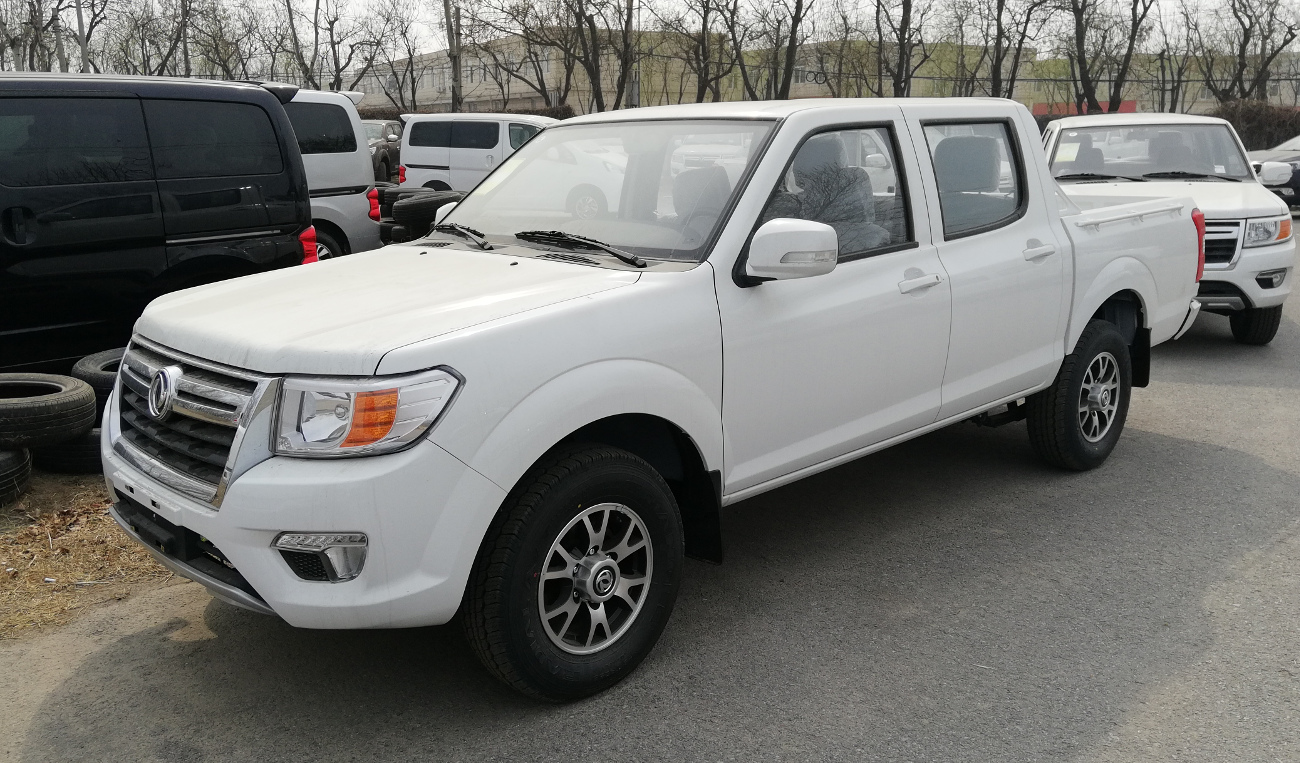
Dongfeng Rich second generation 2018 facelift front.

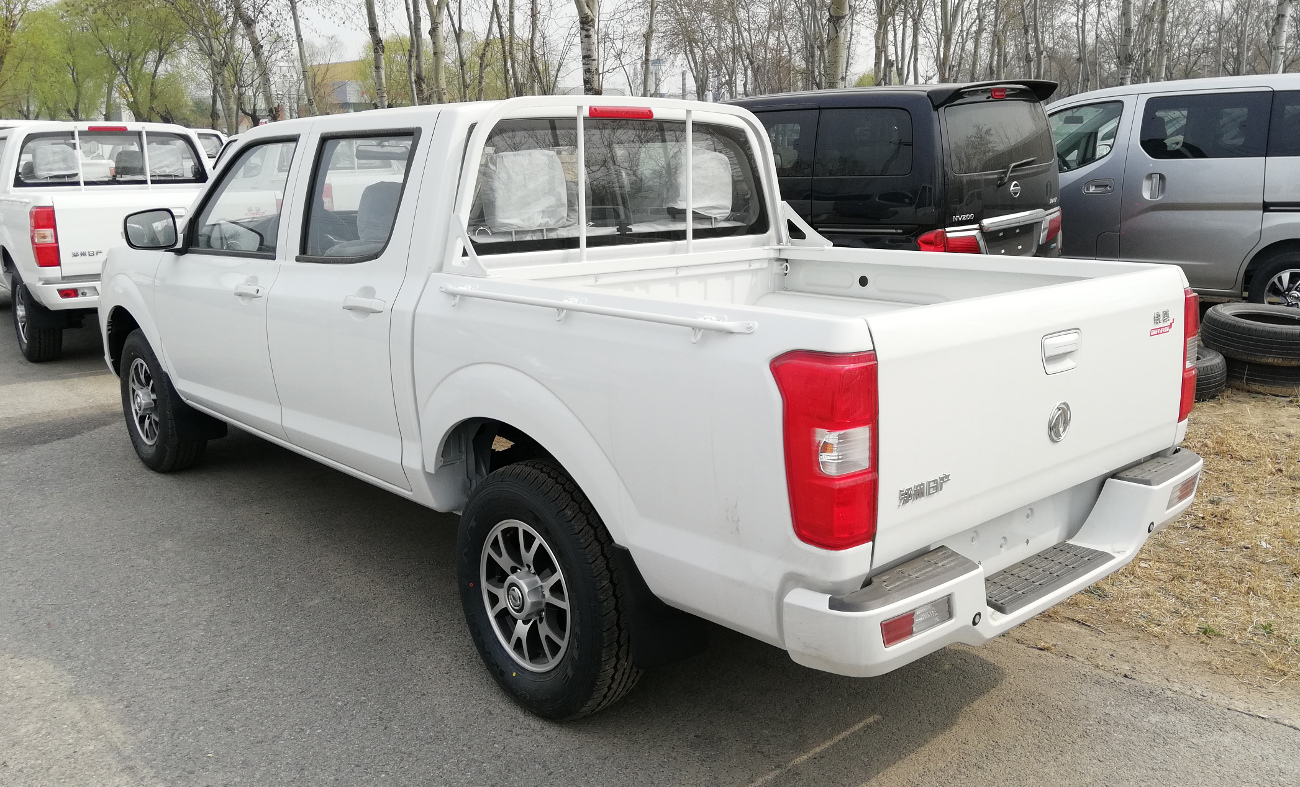
Dongfeng Rich second generation 2018 facelift rear.

=== 2021 facelift ===
The second generation Dongfeng Rich received a facelift for the 2021 model year and was launched in January 2021. The update includes a redesigned front end and revamped interior. The interior now features a 3.5 inch screen and a 7-inch full color display in the center console with reverse camera, Baidu Carlife, navigation, and online music integrated in the system. Electronic stability control is also added to the update. The diesel version is powered by a YCY24165-61 2.4-liter turbo diesel engine, producing a maximum output of 165 hp (123 kW) and 350 N⋅m (258 lb⋅ft) of torque. The petrol version is powered by an ATZD 2.4-liter gasoline engine, producing a maximum output of 158 hp (118 kW) and 235 N⋅m (173 lb⋅ft) of torque. The transmission is a 5-speed manual gearbox and both 2-wheel drive and 4-wheel drive variants are available.

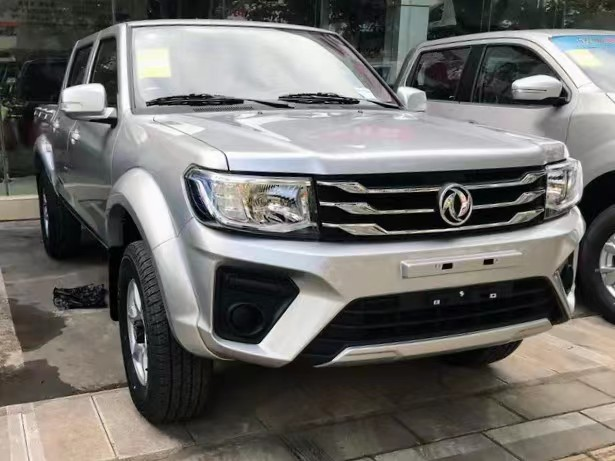
Dongfeng Rich second generation 2021 facelift front.

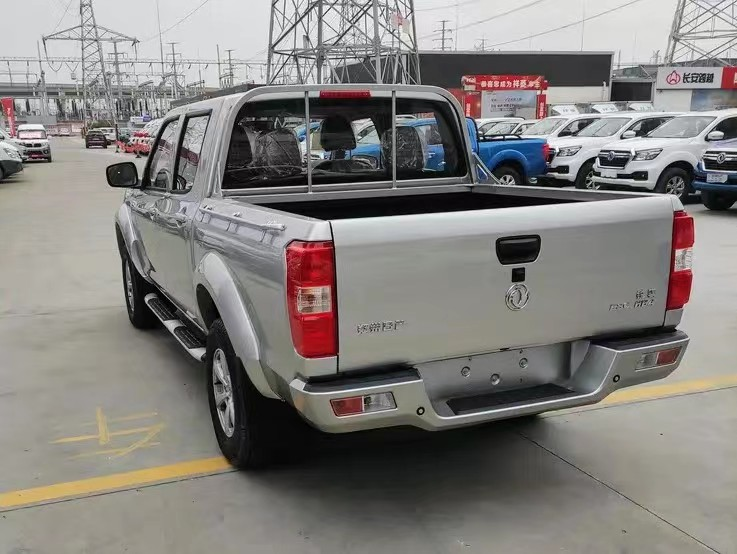
Dongfeng Rich second generation 2021 facelift rear.

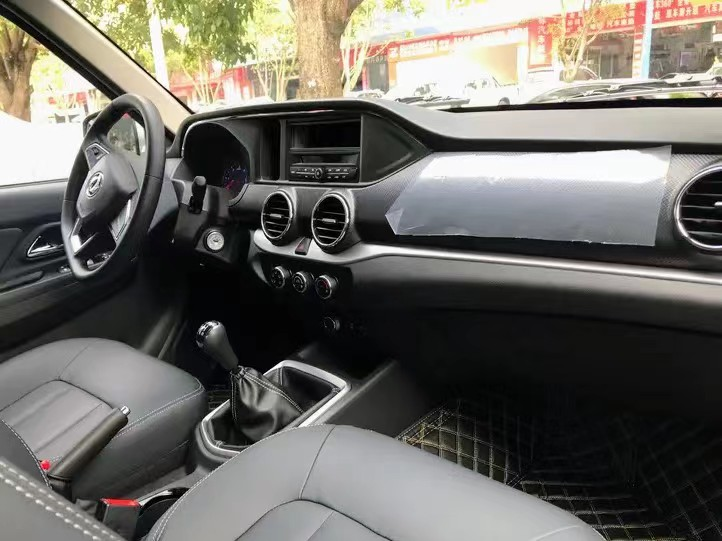
Dongfeng Rich second generation 2021 facelift interior.

=== 2023 facelift (New Rich) ===
2023 facelift sold as New Rich (新锐骐)

=== Peugeot Pick Up ===
Due to the Dongfeng Peugeot-Citroën joint venture between PSA and Dongfeng, it was revealed in July 2017 that Dongfeng will manufacture a badge-engineered version of the Dongfeng Rich double cab pickup as the Peugeot Pickup. The rebadged pickup would be on sale in Africa starting from September 2017.

Peugeot replaced it at the beginning of 2021 with the Peugeot Landtrek.

== Third generation (Gold Rich) ==
The third generation Rich was launched in 2026 called the Gold Rich. Being essentially a cheaper variant of the Rich 6, dimensions are similar. The powertrain of the Gold Rich is a Renault supplied 2.3 liter turbo M9T diesel engine developing 108 kW and 350N·m mated to a 8-speed automatic transmission. Official fuel consumption is 6.8L/100 km.

Dongfeng Rich third generation sold as the Gold Rich (金锐骐)

== Rich 6 ==
Dongfeng Rich 6
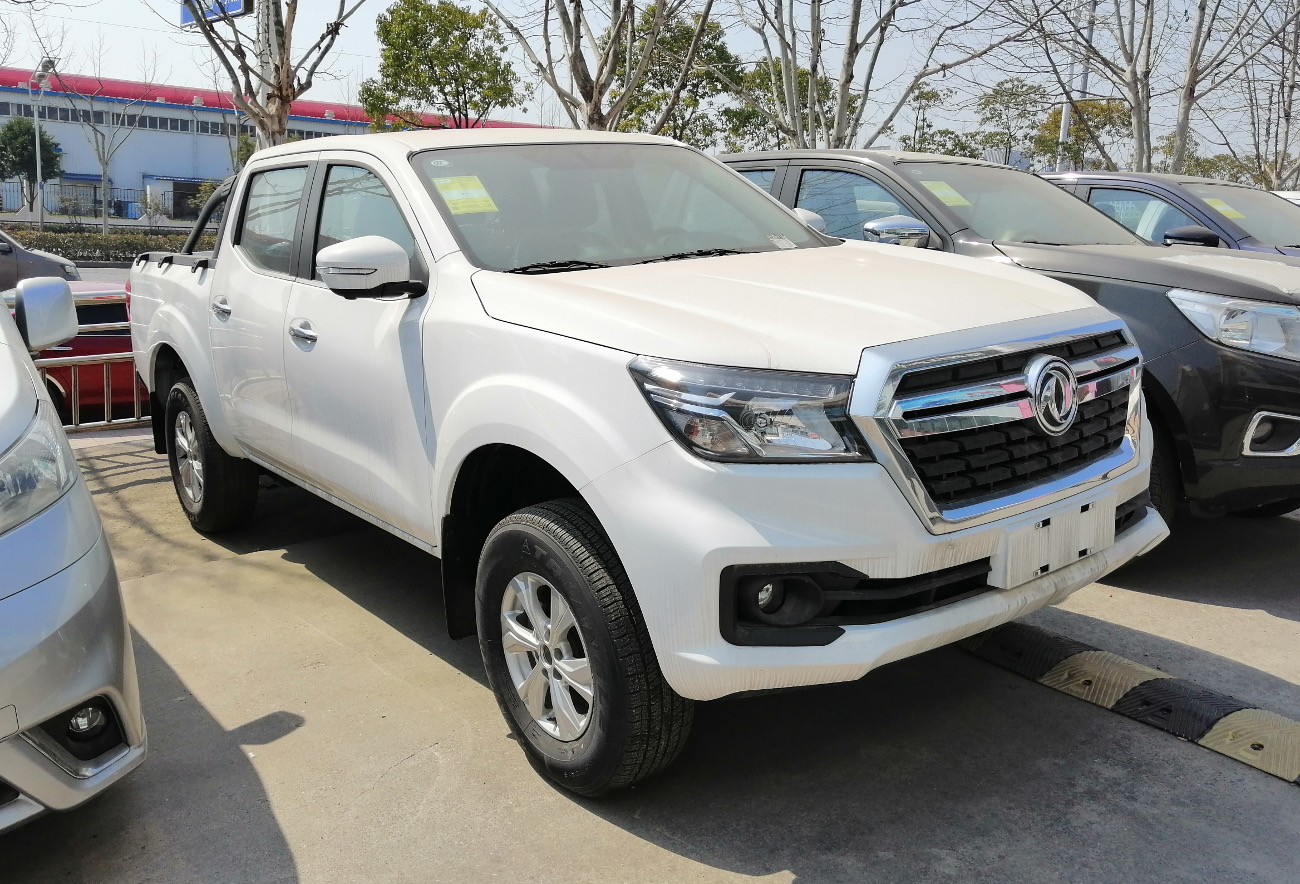

Overview
- Also called: DFSK D1; Dongfeng DF6; Cirelli 8 (Italy); Voltera R6/R7 (Chile); Galloper Ayanet (Spain)
- Production: 2017–present
- Assembly: Zhengzhou, Henan (Zhengzhou Nissan)

Body and chassis
- Related: Nissan Navara D23; Nissan Terra

Powertrain
- Engine: Petrol: 2.4L Nissan ZG24 I4; Diesel: 2.5L Nissan YD25DDTi I4; 2.3L Nissan M9T I4
- Electric motor: 120 kW (163 PS; 161 bhp) Permanent magnet synchronous drive motor (Rich 6 EV 350); 130 kW (177 PS; 174 bhp) Permanent magnet synchronous drive motor (Rich 6 EV 450)
- Battery: 60 kWh (Rich 6 EV 350); 77 kWh (Rich 6 EV 450)

Dimensions
- Wheelbase: 3,150 mm (124.0 in)
- Length: 5,290–5,310 mm (208.3–209.1 in)
- Width: 1,850 mm (72.8 in)
- Height: 1,810 mm (71.3 in)

A more upmarket model named the Rich 6 was launched in 2017 selling alongside the regular Dongfeng Rich. It is based on the third generation Nissan Navara with only the front end restyled. It is also available as an EV with a 60 or 77 kWh battery and a single electric motor.

A 5-door SUV bodystyle was also available as the Palazzo (Palasuo, 帕拉索).

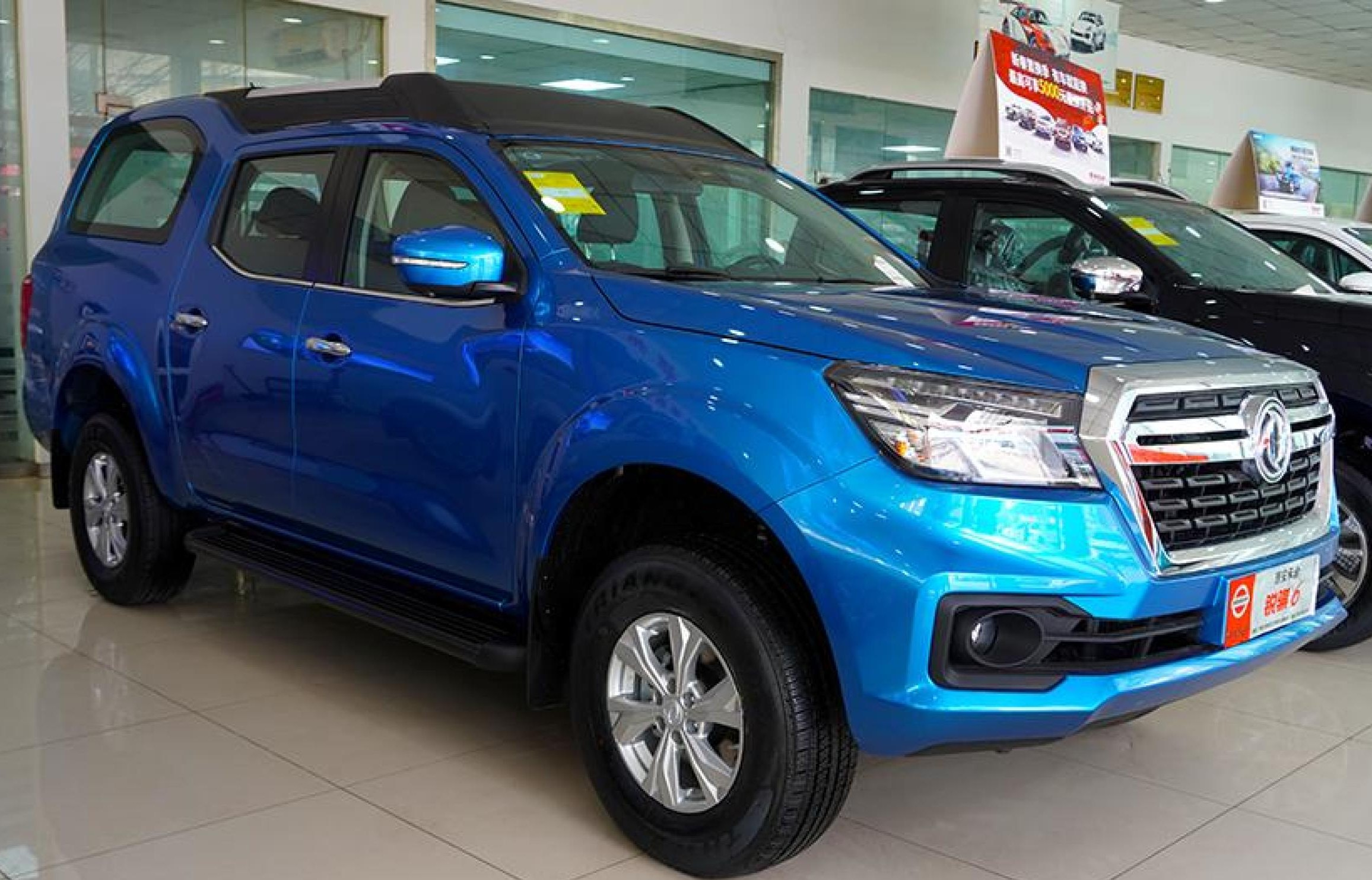
Dongfeng Palazzo front end

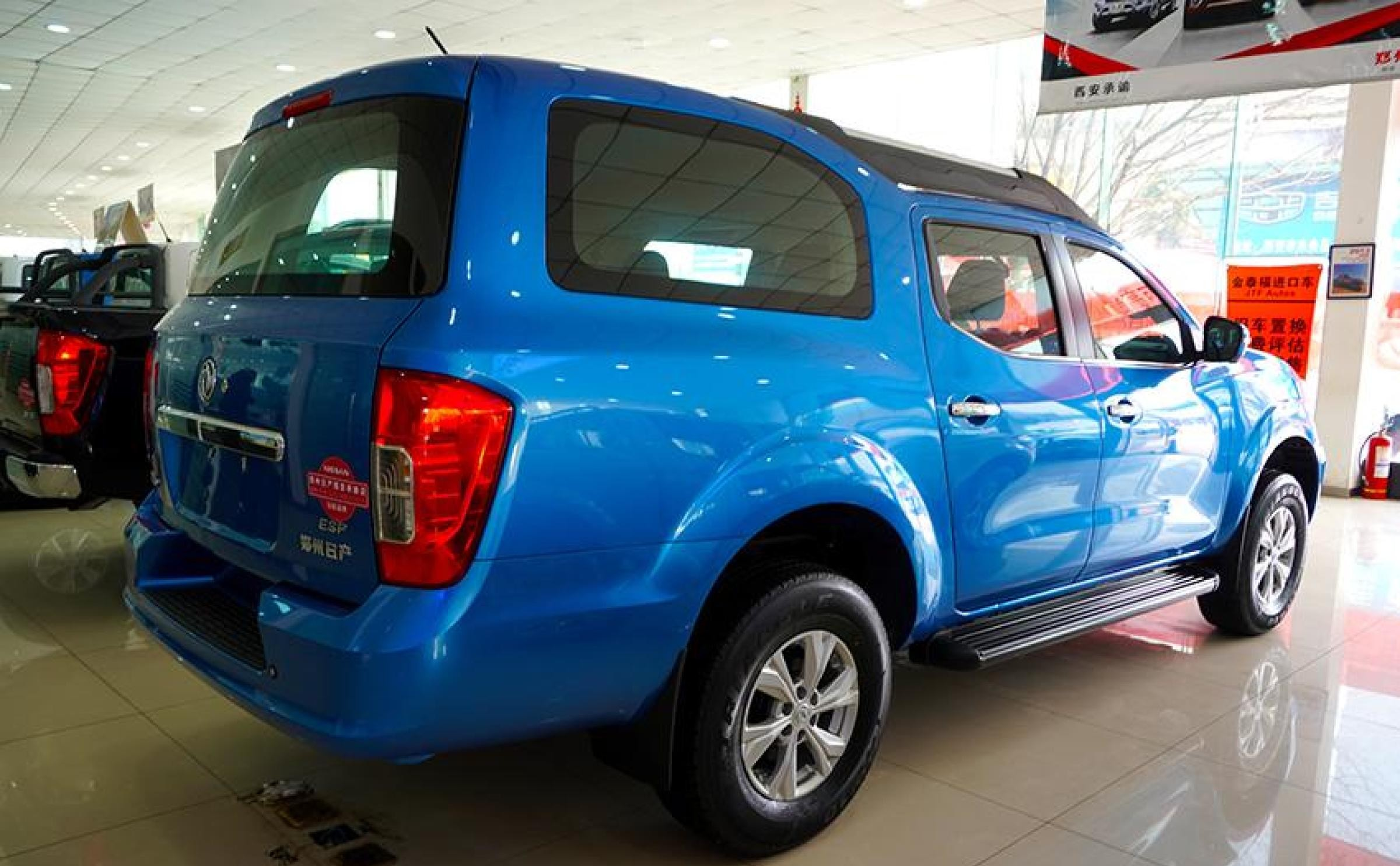
Dongfeng Palazzo rear end

=== Powertrain and performance ===
There are two engines available for the Rich 6. The 2.4-litre gasoline engine of the Rich 6 has a maximum power output of 158 PS (156 hp; 116 kW) and peak torque of 230 N⋅m (170 lb⋅ft), mated to a 5-speed manual gearbox; the 2.5-litre turbo diesel engine of the Rich 6 has a maximum power output of 140 PS (138 hp; 103 kW) and a peak torque of 305 N⋅m (225 lb⋅ft), matched with a 5-speed manual gearbox and a 6-speed automatic gearbox from ZF Friedrichshafen with economic, sports and snow driving mode. The four-wheel drive system is supplied by BorgWarner, but without a rear axle differential lock. The suspension structure is front double wishbone and rear leaf spring, while the elastic element is 5 pieces of variable section steel plate. In terms of the off-road capabilities, the approach angle, departure angle and minimum ground clearance of Rich 6 is 31°, 20°, and 207mm. The Rich 6 is equipped with 255/70 R16 tires, with front disc brakes and rear drum brakes as standard.

=== Electric version ===
In March 2023 Zhengzhou-Nissan launched the electric version of Rich 6. Two version was sold:

- Rich 6 350: rear-wheel drive, single electric motor with 163 hp (122 kW) and 420 N⋅m (310 lb⋅ft). 100 km/h (62 mph) top speed. 60.16 LFP battery from CATL and 350 km (CLTC range)
- Rich 6 450: rear-wheel drive. Single motor, 177 hp (132 kW) and 450 N⋅m (332 lb⋅ft). 120 km/h (75 mph) top speed. 77.28 kWh LFP battery from CATL and 453 km in CLTC range.

== Rich 7 ==
Launched in June 2022, the Rich 7 is a more premium variant of the Rich 6, featuring a more civilian front end design. The Rich 7 model equipped with the M9T 2.3-liter turbo diesel engine produces a maximum output of 166 hp (124 kW) and 420 N⋅m (310 lb⋅ft) which is 3 hp (2 kW) more and 40 N⋅m (30 lb⋅ft) more compared to the Rich 6 equipped with the M9T engine. The transmission is a ZF supplied 8-speed automatic gearbox. The Rich 7 also spawned the Dongfeng Palazzo facelift in 2022.

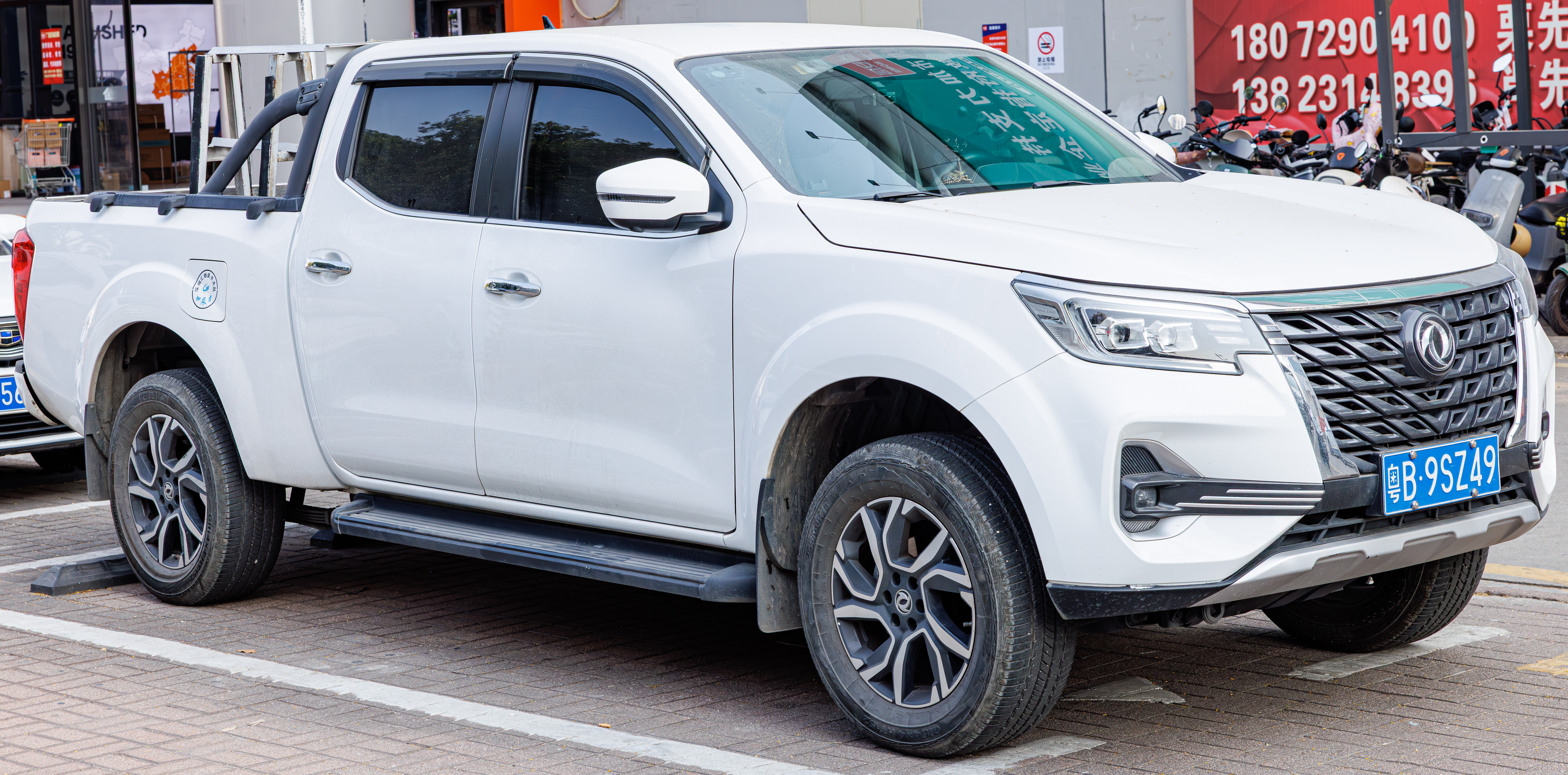
Dongfeng Rich 7 front end

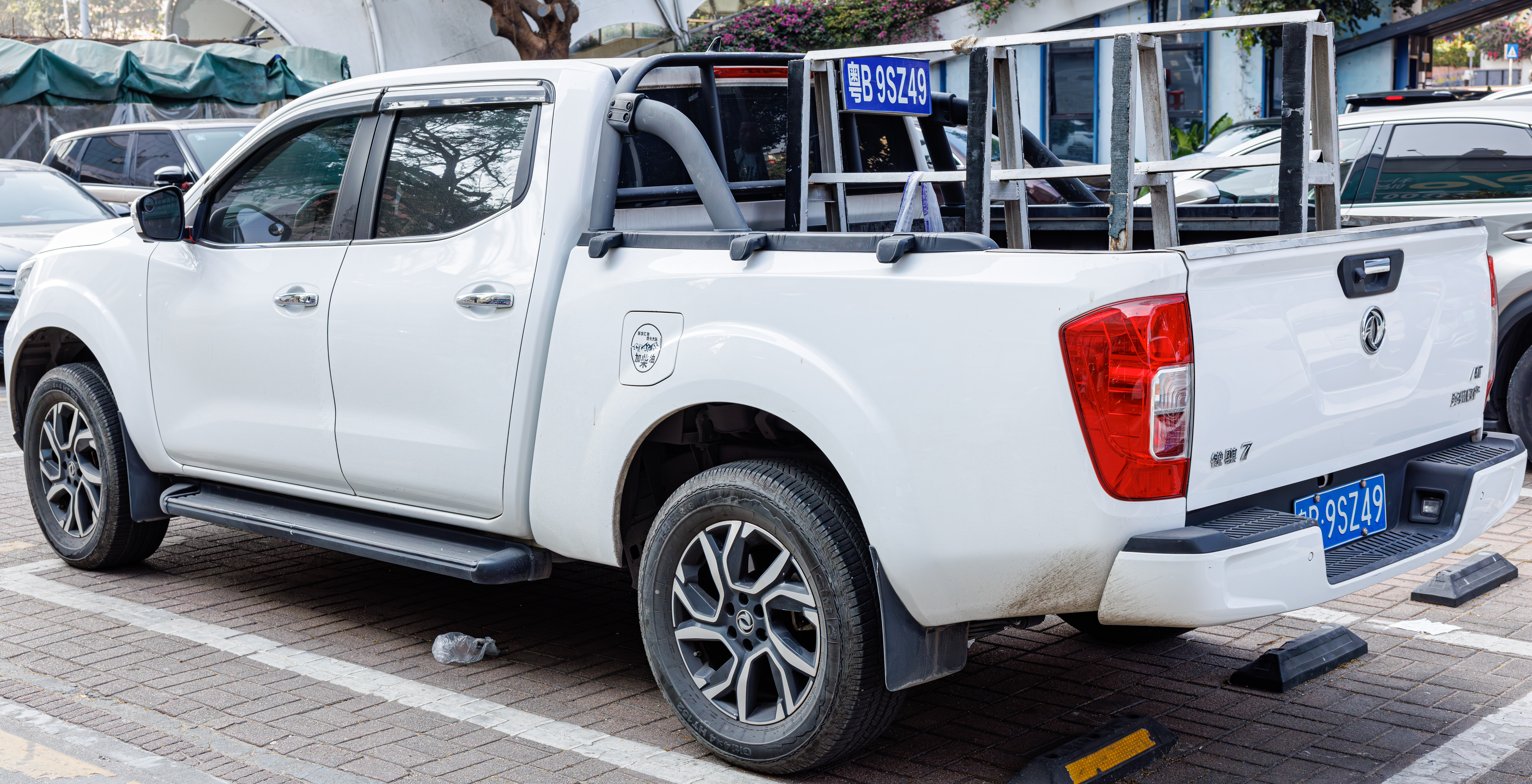
Dongfeng Rich 7 rear end
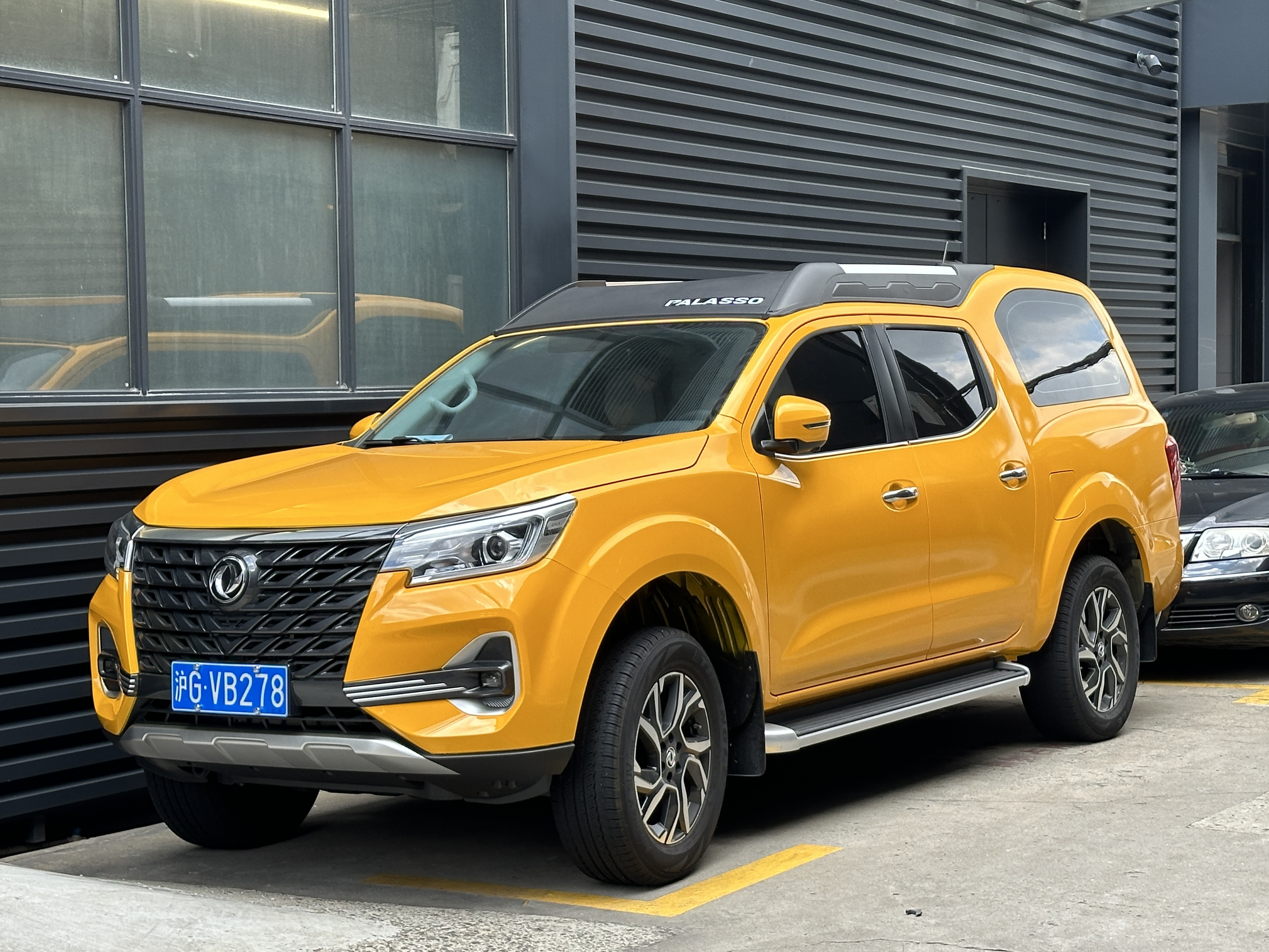
Dongfeng Palazzo 2022 facelift front end

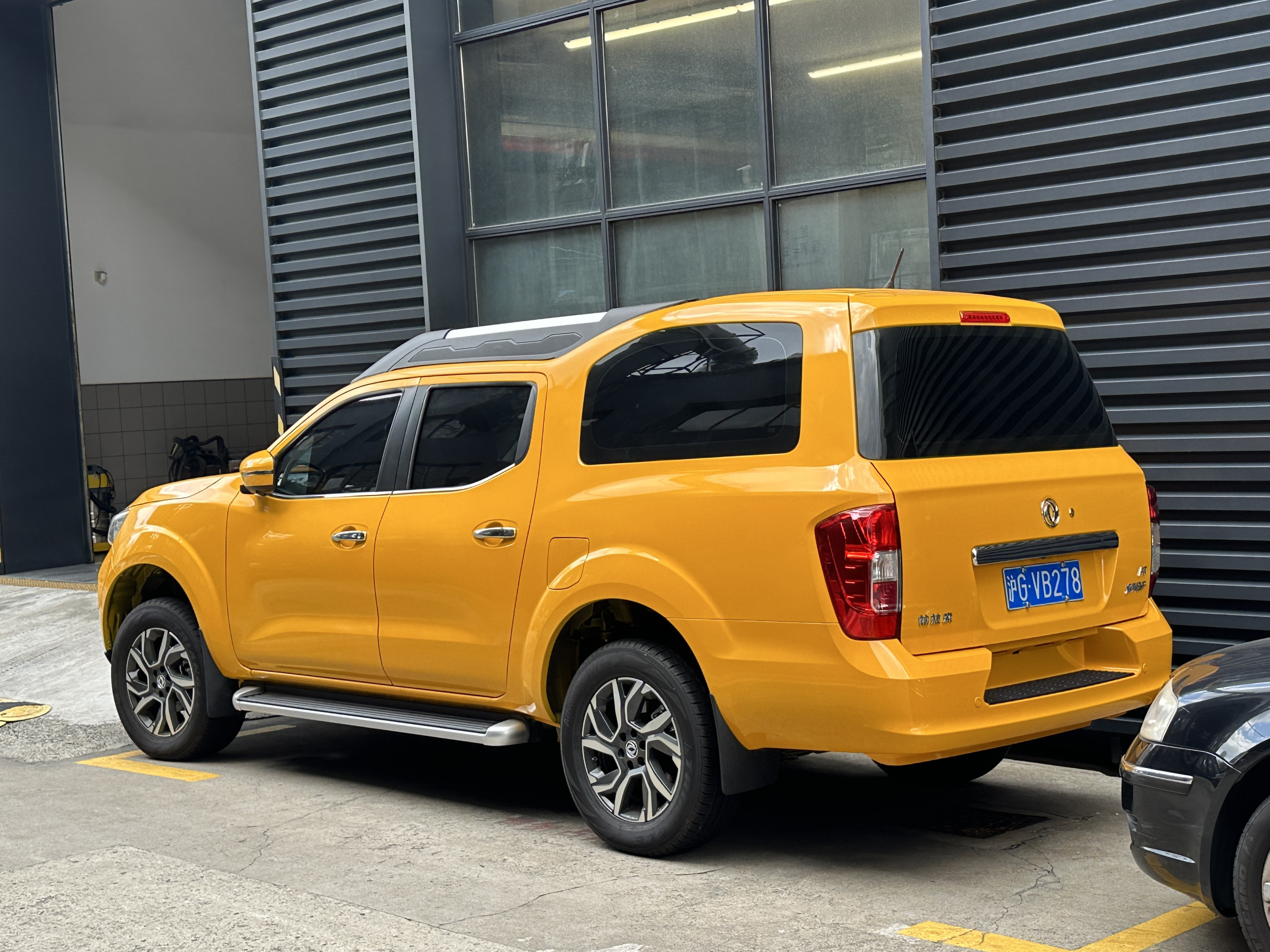
Dongfeng Palazzo 2022 facelift rear end

=== Electric version ===
Launched in July 2024, the Rich 7 Electric features a 180 kW (241 hp) motor and a 77.28 kWh CATL LFP battery. It is available in a rear-wheel drive version with a range of 451 km (CLTC), or an all-wheel drive version with a range of 431 km (CLTC). Dimensions are 5287 mm in length, 1880 mm in width, and 1860 mm in height, with a wheelbase of 3150 mm. In the export market the Rich 7 EV was sold by DFSK rebadged DFSK D1 EV only with a 60 kWh battery and rear-wheel drive.

The Palazzo Electric measures 5520 mm in length, 2010 mm in height, and is equipped with the same electric motor and range as the Rich 7 EV. It offers a range of 410 km (CLTC) and features all-wheel drive.

Dongfeng Rich 7 EV
