= Peugeot Hoggar Concept =

Peugeot Hoggar
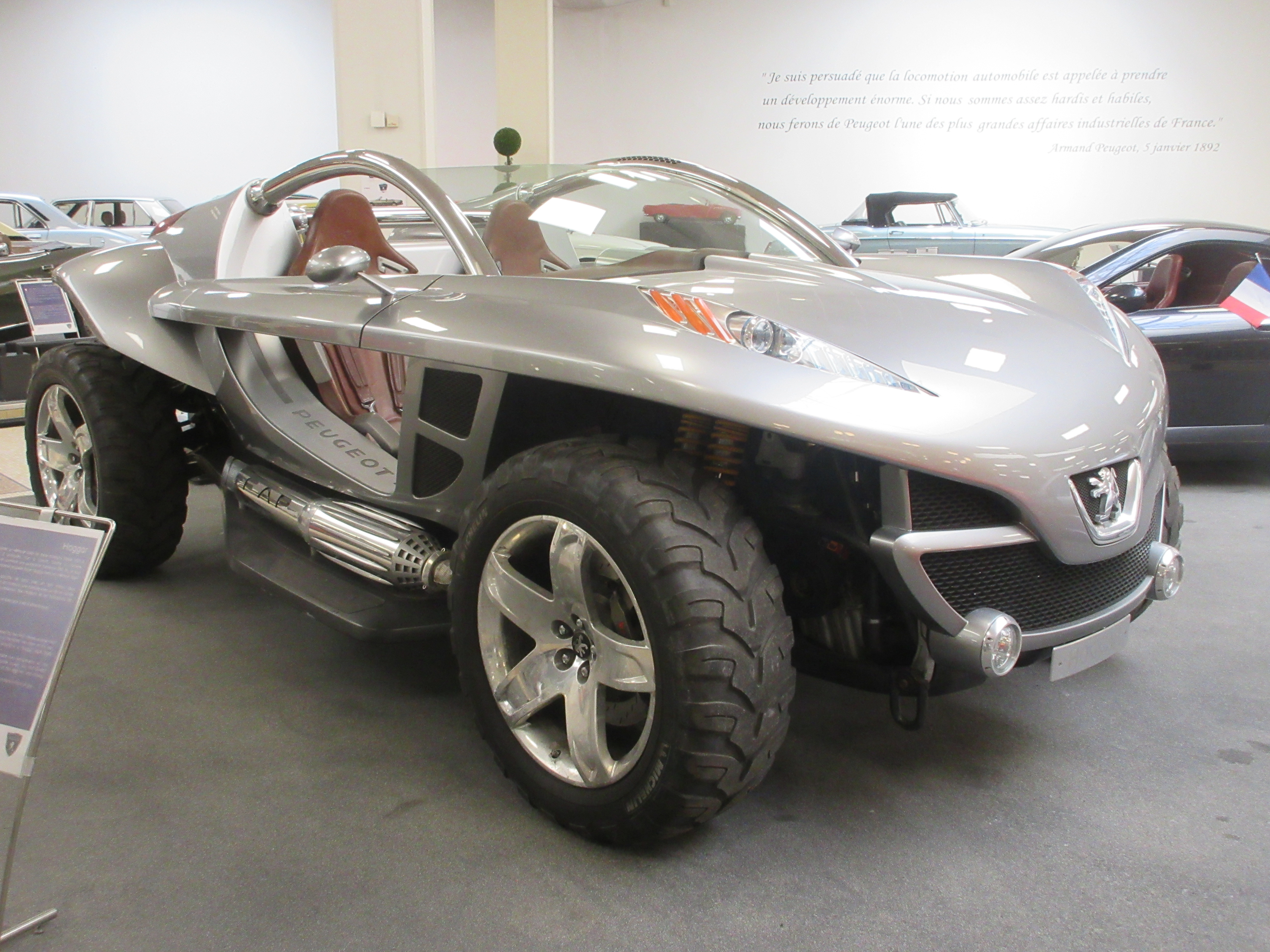

Overview
- Manufacturer: Peugeot
- Production: 2004

Body and chassis
- Class: Concept car
- Body style: 2-door off-road vehicle
- Layout: 4WD
- Doors: Gullwing

Powertrain
- Engine: 2.168 L (2,168 cc) DOHC I4 based on 2x 2.2 L HDi turbocharged I4
- Transmission: 6-speed sequential manual with hydraulic actuators

Dimensions
- Wheelbase: 2,750 mm (108.3 in)
- Length: 3,960 mm (155.9 in)
- Width: 2,000 mm (78.7 in)
- Height: 4,960 mm (195.3 in)
- Curb weight: 1,300 kg (2,900 lb)

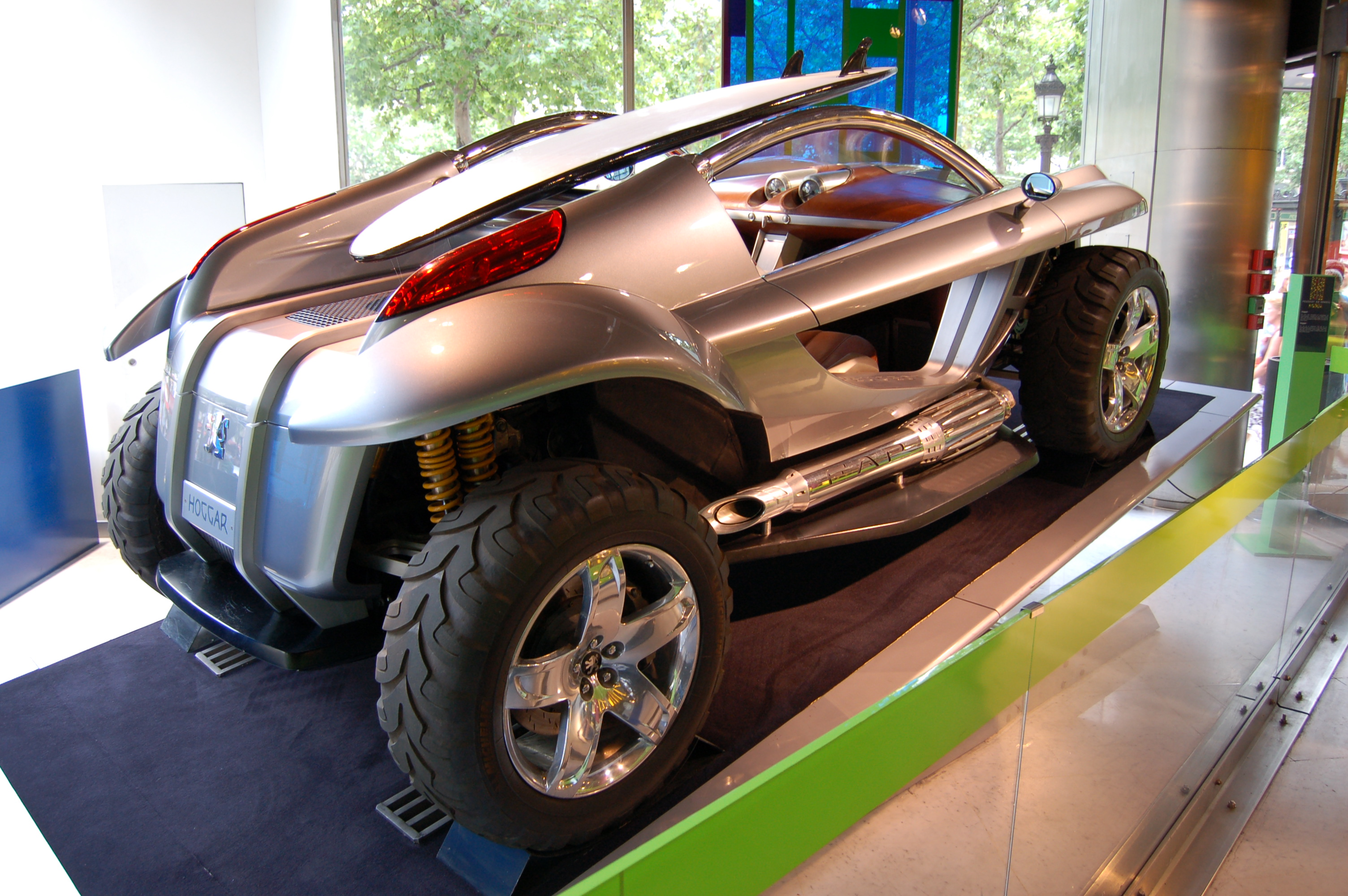
Rear view

The Peugeot Hoggar was a concept car manufactured by Peugeot. It was a two-seater off-road vehicle, powered by two diesel engines that drove the front and rear wheels in a four wheel drive configuration.

The name has also been used by Peugeot for a production coupe utility variant of their front engined, front wheel drive Peugeot 207.

== Overview ==
The car principally consisted of a one-piece carbon honeycomb body reinforced by two upper longitudinal roll-over bars completed from stainless steel, each with a diameter of 76 mm (3.0 in). These tubes also served as an air intake and air conduit to the front engine (left-hand tube) and rear engine (right-hand tube). Both engines displaced 2168 cc and produced power of around 180 bhp (134 kW). The two engines consequently supplied a collective power of nearly 360 bhp (268 kW) and a maximum torque of 800 N⋅m (590 lb⋅ft).
