= Peugeot Hoggar (coupé utility) =

Pickup truck

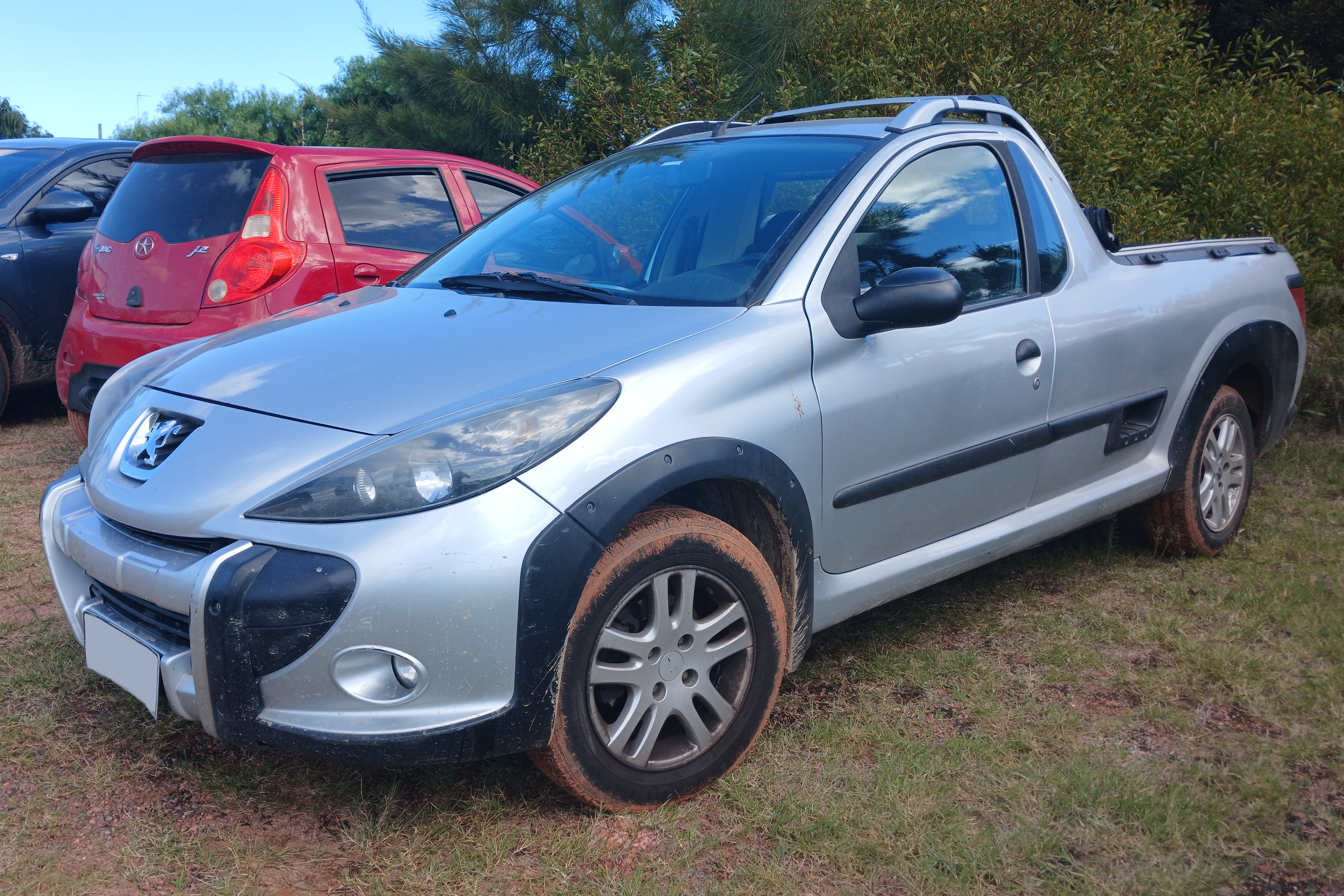

Overview
- Manufacturer: Groupe PSA
- Production: 2010–2014
- Assembly: Porto Real, Brazil (Usine PSA)

Body and chassis
- Class: Supermini coupé utility
- Body style: 2-door coupé utility
- Layout: Front-engine, front-wheel-drive layout
- Related: Peugeot 206+

Powertrain
- Engine: 1.4 8V Flex-Fuel 82 cv (petrol or ethanol); 1.6 16V Flex-Fuel 113 cv (petrol or ethanol)

Chronology
- Predecessor: Peugeot 504 coupé utility
- Successor: Peugeot Pick Up

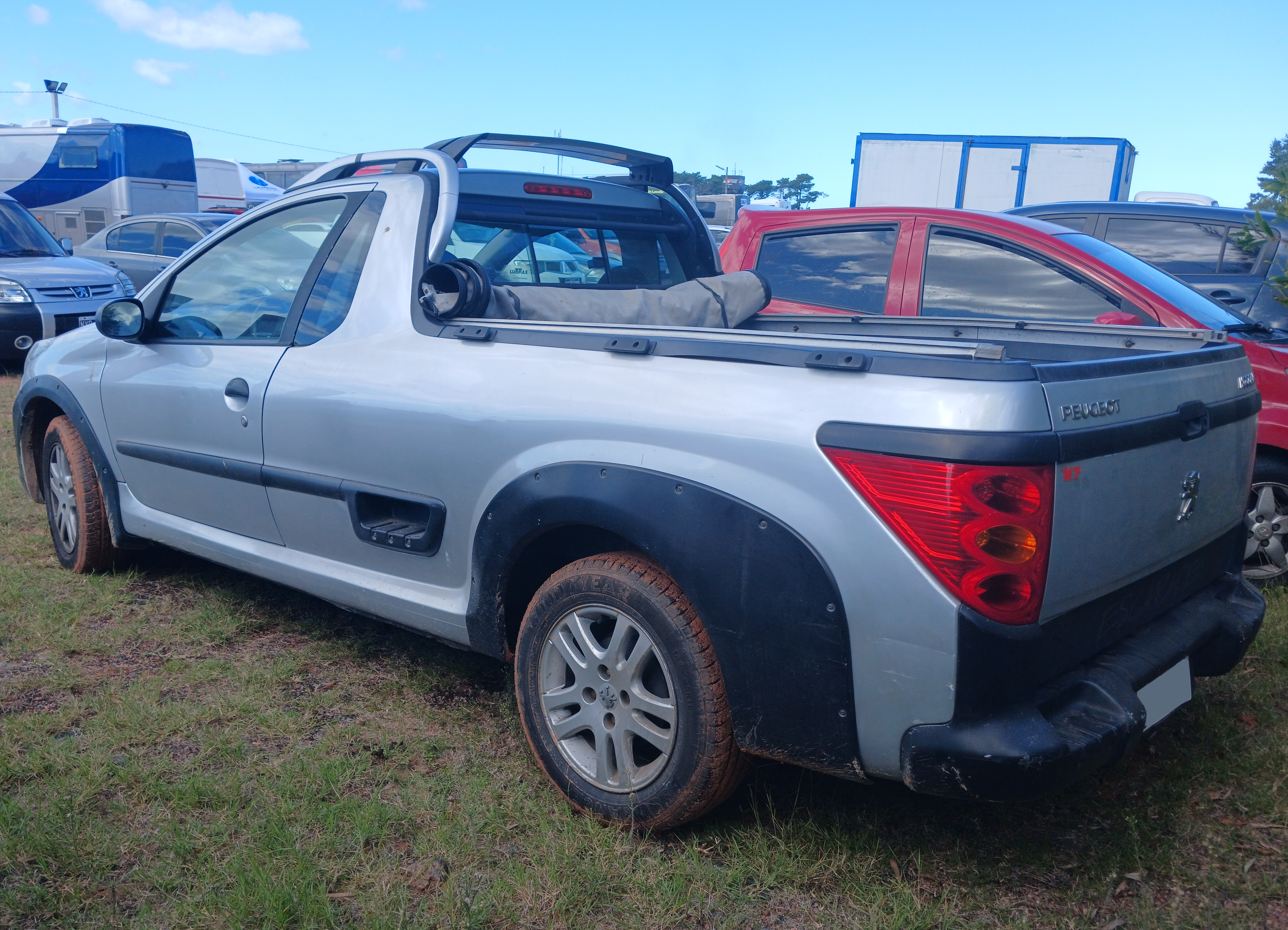
Rear view

The Peugeot Hoggar is a coupé utility produced by Peugeot as a variant of their front-engined, front wheel drive Peugeot 206+ for the Brazilian and South American market. It was produced by Usine PSA of Porto Real, Brazil from 2010 to 2014.

The name Hoggar was taken from the concept car of the same name, unveiled in 2004. The car was designed to be stylish as well as practical, and to support Peugeot's aim of 10% market share of pickups in Brazil by the end of 2010.

== Engines ==
- 1.4 8V Flex-Fuel 82 cv (petrol or ethanol)
- 1.6 16V Flex-Fuel 113 cv (petrol or ethanol)

== Sales ==
Year	Brazil
2010	4,141
2011	5,655
2012	2,156
2013	747
2014	354
