= LA Auto Show =

Annual US auto show

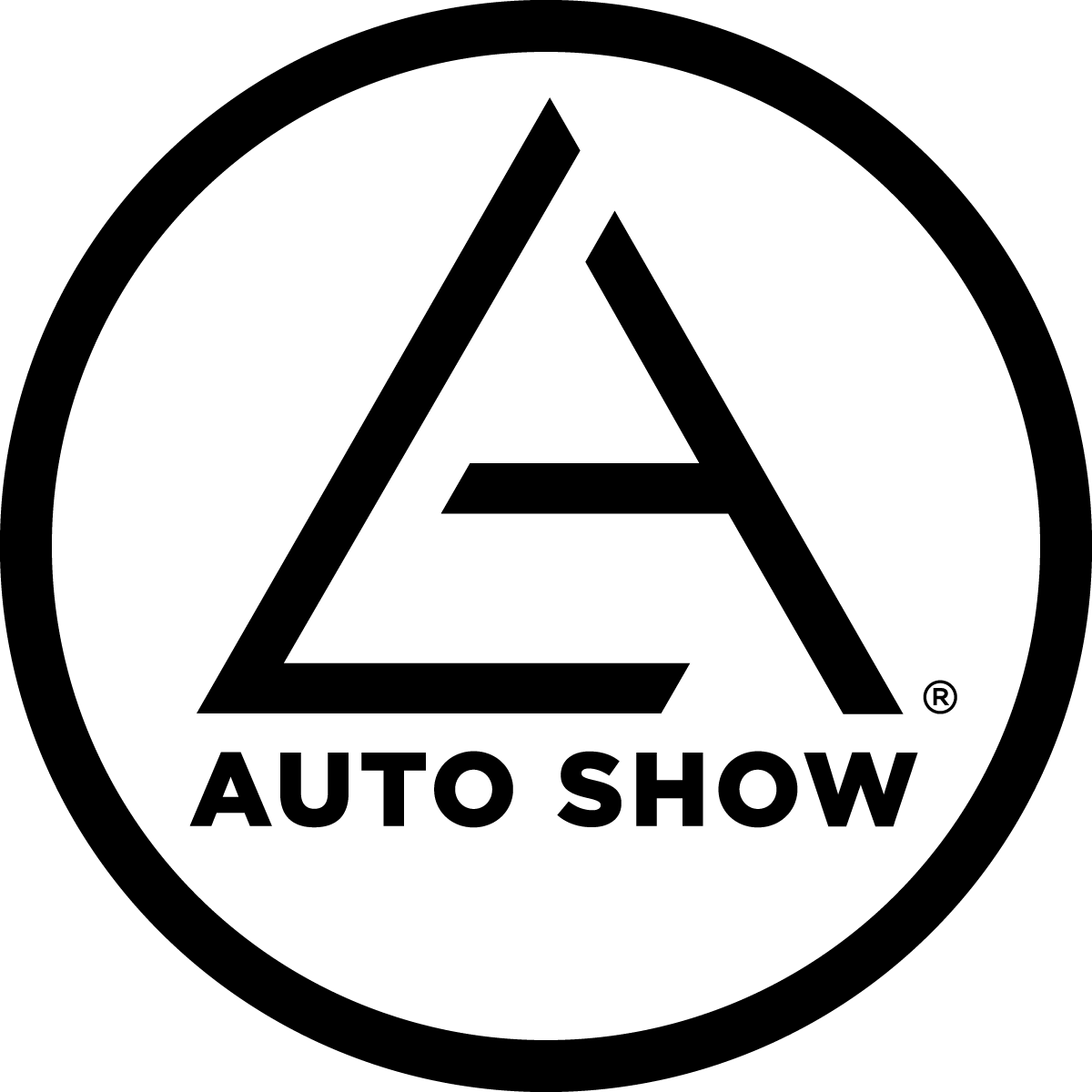
- Genre: Auto show
- Venue: Los Angeles Convention Center
- Location: Los Angeles, California
- Country: United States
- Inaugurated: 1907
- Previous event: November 21–30, 2025
- Next event: November 20–29, 2026
- Participants: 100+
- Organizer: ANSA Productions
- Website: laautoshow.com

The Los Angeles Auto Show, also known as the LA Auto Show, is an auto show held annually at the Los Angeles Convention Center in Los Angeles, California, United States. It is open to the public for ten days, filling 760,000 square feet (71,000 m^{2}) of exhibit space. Since 2006 the event is held in November or December.

The LA Auto Show is an OICA sanctioned international exhibition. It is one of the four major auto shows in North America together with Detroit, Chicago and New York.

The show begins with AutoMobility LA, a several day press showing.

== History ==
The Los Angeles Auto Show began in 1907 with ninety-nine vehicles on display at Morley's Skating Rink. In 1910, the event was held under a canvas big top at Fiesta Park. As the auto industry grew, the auto show changed venues four times throughout the 1920s to accommodate the growing needs of vendors. During the 1922 show, the sixteenth, a short circuit in one of the airplane exhibits caused a massive fire that destroyed the entire venue, resulting in over US$1 million ($19.2 million in 2025 dollars) worth of damages. There were no injuries. With the help of the community, the show reopened one day later at the Shrine Auditorium. In 1926, it took place at the corner of Hill and Washington where it stayed for the next four years.

The show continued to prove successful throughout the 1930s, but took a down turn during the Second World War and went on hiatus from 1940 through 1951. In 1952, the show re-opened at the Pan Pacific Auditorium with 152 vehicles on display, including those from international manufacturers.

In 2006, the show moved its dates from early January to late November/early December, thus resulting in two shows during the year. The second 2006 event celebrated the show's centennial, despite its 100th year being 2007.

== AutoMobility LA ==
In response to new technologies such as driver assist and cloud-based infotainment in the auto industry, the LA Auto Show organizers created the Connected Car Expo in 2013.

The LA Auto Show begins with AutoMobility LA, four days catered to journalists, designers and industry representatives. In 2014, the show had 65 debuts, a record number. From 2013 to 2015, the first of three Press & Trade Days was devoted to the Connected Car Expo, a mingling affair for automotive and technology professionals. Connected Car Expo was merged with the show's Press & Trade days to create AutoMobility LA in 2016. For 2016, AutoMobility LA also included several events, with four days of networking, three days of breaking news, and two days of learning. The Press & Trade Days Kickoff Party was held for industry and media professionals the night before AutoMobility LA Conference. The Green Car of the Year Awards presented by the Green Car Journal. 2019 also marked the 10th anniversary of the Hispanic Motor Press Awards, presented to the best cars as selected by a national jury composed of Hispanic journalist, bloggers, and influencers. (www.hispanicmotorpress.org) During the Design LA Open House & Reception, automotive design studios present concepts to a judging committee, and the winner of judges' pick as well as people's choice award are both announced during the annual reception. During the Green/Tech Ride & Drive, there were test drives of new tech and green advancements exclusively for media. Automobile designers finished out Design LA at the Designers’ Night Reception hosted by Car Design News, which was offsite and required separate registration to attend.

== 2026 ==
The 2026 LA Auto show will be held from November 20 to 29. AutoMobility LA will take place on November 19.

=== Production model debuts ===
==== World debuts ====
- 2027 Acura Integra Type S Heritage Edition (auto show debut)
- 2027 Chrysler Pacifica Copperline
- 2028 Genesis G80 Hybrid
- 2027 Volkswagen Atlas Cross Sport (auto show debut)

==== North American debuts ====
- 2028 Genesis GV80 Hybrid
- 2027–28 Hyundai Elantra, Elantra Hybrid
- 2027.5 Volkswagen Golf GTI Rabbit Edition

=== Concept cars ===
==== World debuts ====
- Honda Base Station (camper trailer) prototype (public debut)

== 2025 ==
The 2025 LA Auto show was held from November 21 to 30. AutoMobility LA took place on November 20.

=== Production model debuts ===
==== World debuts ====
- 2026 Honda Pilot (refresh)
- 2027 Kia Telluride
- 2026 Nissan Pathfinder (refresh)
- 2026 Nissan Rogue Plug-In Hybrid

==== North American debuts ====
- Alfa Romeo 33 Stradale (auto show debut)
- 2026 Alfa Romeo Tonale (refresh)
- 2026 Genesis G70 Prestige Graphite

=== Concept cars ===
==== World debuts ====
- Hyundai Crater

Volkswagen also displayed a fully restored 1977 T2 microbus, nicknamed "Azul" by its owner, which received media attention for surviving the Palisades Fire in California in January 2025.

== 2024 ==
The 2024 LA Auto Show was held from November 22 through December 1, 2024. AutoMobility LA took place on November 22, 2024.

=== Production model debuts ===
==== World debuts ====
- 2025 Acura ADX (auto show debut)
- 2025 Chrysler Pacifica FAV Edition
- 2025 Fiat 500e Giorgio Armani Collector's Edition
- 2026 Honda Passport (auto show debut)
- 2026 Hyundai Ioniq 9
- 2026 Kia EV9 GT

==== North American debuts ====
- 2026 Genesis GV70 (refresh)
- 2025 Kia EV6 (refresh)
- 2026 Kia Sportage (refresh)
- 2025 Volkswagen Tiguan

=== Concept cars ===
==== North American debuts ====
- Hyundai Initium

== 2023 ==
The 2023 LA Auto Show was held from November 17 through 26, 2023. AutoMobility LA took place on November 16, 2023.

=== Production model debuts ===
==== World debuts ====
- 2024 Ford Mustang GT California Special
- 2025 Lucid Gravity
- Pebble Flow (electric travel trailer)
- 2025 Subaru Forester
- 2025 Toyota Camry
- 2025 Toyota Crown Signia

==== North American debuts ====
- 2025 Genesis GV80 (refresh), GV80 Coupe
- 2025 Hyundai Ioniq 5 N
- 2024 Hyundai Santa Fe
- 2025 Kia Sorento (refresh)

=== Concept cars ===
==== North American debuts ====
- Honda Prelude Concept
- Kia EV3 Concept
- Kia EV4 Concept

== 2022 ==
The 2022 Los Angeles Auto Show was held from November 18 through 27, 2022. AutoMobility LA took place on November 17.

=== Production model debuts ===
==== World debuts ====
- 2024 Kia Seltos (refresh)
- 2024 Porsche 911 Dakar
- 2024 Subaru Impreza
- 2023 Toyota Prius, Prius Prime

==== North American debuts ====
- 2024 Fiat 500e (European spec)
- 2023 Genesis Electrified GV70
- 2023 Hyundai Ioniq 6

=== Concept cars ===
==== World debuts ====
- Genesis X Convertible
- Toyota bZ Compact SUV concept

==== North American debuts ====
- Hyundai N Vision 74

== 2021 ==
The 2020 Los Angeles Auto Show was scheduled to take place from November 20–29, 2020 but due to the COVID-19 pandemic, it was cancelled and rescheduled to May 21 through 31, 2021. It was rescheduled again to November 19 through 28, 2021. AutoMobility LA, which includes auto show press days and vehicle debuts, took place on November 17 and 18.

=== Production model debuts ===
==== World debuts ====
- 2022 Bremach 4x4 SUV
- 2023 Fisker Ocean
- 2023 Kia Sportage Hybrid
- 2022 Lexus LX 600 (auto show debut)
- 2022-23 Mazda CX-50
- 2022 Porsche 718 Cayman GT4 RS, GT4 RS Clubsport
- 2022 Porsche Taycan GTS
- 2022 Range Rover (auto show debut)
- 2023 Subaru Solterra

==== North American debuts ====
- 2022 BMW CE 04 (electric scooter)
- 2023 Nissan Ariya
- 2023 Toyota bZ4X

=== Concept cars ===
==== World debuts ====
- EdisonFuture EF1-T
- Hyundai Seven (Ioniq 7 concept)
- Kia Concept EV9
- Mullen Five (prototype)
- VinFast VF e35, VF e36 (prototypes)

==== North American debuts ====
- Mini Vision Urbanaut

== 2019 ==
The 2019 Los Angeles Auto Show was held from November 22 through December 1, 2019. AutoMobility LA, which includes auto show press days and vehicle debuts, took place from November 18 through November 21.

=== Production model debuts ===
==== World debuts ====
- 2020 Acura MDX PMC Edition
- 2021 Aston Martin DBX
- 2020 Audi e-tron Sportback
- 2020 Audi RS Q8
- 2020 BMW 2 Series Gran Coupé
- 2020 BMW M2 CS
- 2020 BMW M8 Gran Coupé
- 2020 BMW X5 M, X6 M (auto show debut)
- Bollinger B1/B2 electric SUV/truck
- 2020 Dodge Challenger 50th Anniversary Edition
- 2021 Ford Mustang Mach-E
- 2020 Hyundai Ioniq (refresh)
- 2020 Karma Revero GTS
- 2020 Kia Niro Hybrid (refresh)
- 2021 Lexus LC 500 Convertible
- 2021 Lincoln Corsair Grand Touring (PHEV)
- 2021 Mercedes-AMG GLE 63 S
- 2021 Mercedes-AMG GLS 63
- 2020 Mini John Cooper Works GP
- 2020 Porsche Taycan 4S (auto show debut)
- 2020 Subaru WRX, WRX STI Series.White
- 2021 Toyota RAV4 Prime (PHEV)
- 2020 Volkswagen Atlas Cross Sport

==== North American debuts ====
- 2020 Alfa Romeo Giulia (refresh)
- 2020 Alfa Romeo Stelvio (refresh)
- 2020 Audi RS 6 Avant
- 2020 Audi S8
- 2020 BMW X3 xDrive30e (PHEV)
- 2020 BMW 330e (PHEV)
- 2020 Buick Encore GX
- 2021 Chevrolet Trailblazer
- 2020 Fiat 500X Sport
- 2020 Genesis G90 (refresh)
- 2020 Honda CR-V Hybrid
- 2021 Kia Seltos
- 2020 Land Rover Defender 110
- 2020 Mazda CX-30
- 2020 Mini Cooper SE (EV)
- 2020 Nissan Sentra
- 2020 Porsche Macan Turbo (refresh)
- 2020 Porsche Taycan
- 2021 Toyota Mirai

=== Concept cars ===
==== World debuts ====
- Hyundai Vision T (plug-in hybrid SUV)
- Karma SC2
- Kia Seltos X-Line concepts (Trail Attack, Urban)
- Volkswagen ID. Space Vizzion

==== North American debuts ====
- Mercedes-Benz Vision Mercedes Simplex

=== Race car debuts ===
==== World debuts ====
- Hyundai RM19
- Volkswagen Atlas Cross Sport R (Baja 1000)

==== North American debuts ====
- Porsche 99X Electric (Formula E)

== 2018 ==
The show took place from November 30 to December 9, 2018, at the Los Angeles Convention Center. AutoMobility LA, which includes auto show press days and vehicle debuts, took place from November 26 through November 29. Around 1,000 cars were displayed at the venue. Like other years, visitors could sit in cars and test certain models in the Test Drive area. Newsweek observed that the show was "dominated by bulkier models" such as SUVs and trucks. Electric auto makers Byton and Rivian made their first appearance at the auto show. The last version of the VW Beetle made its local debut at the show. Volvo was at the show, but didn't bring cars, breaking tradition. The Honda Insight was named 2019 Green Car of the Year at the show.

=== Production model debuts ===
==== World debuts ====
- 2019 Bentley Continental GT Convertible
- 2019 BMW 8 Series Convertible
- 2020 BMW M340i
- 2019 BMW X7
- 2019 Honda Passport
- 2020 Hyundai Palisade
- 2020 Jeep Gladiator
- 2020 Kia Soul
- 2019 Lexus LX Inspiration Series
- 2020 Lincoln Aviator
- 2019 Mazda3
- 2019 Mercedes-AMG GT R Pro
- 2019 Mercedes-AMG GT 2-door (refresh)
- 2019 Nissan Maxima (refresh)
- 2019 Nissan Murano (refresh)
- 2020 Porsche 911 (992)
- 2019 Porsche 911 GT2 RS Clubsport (991.2)
- Rivian R1T, R1S
- 2019 Subaru Crosstrek Hybrid (plug-in)
- 2020 Toyota Avalon, Camry TRD
- 2020 Toyota Corolla Hybrid
- 2019 Toyota Prius (refresh)
- 2019 Volkswagen Beetle Final Edition
- 2019 Volvo S60 (auto show debut)
- 2019 Volvo V60 Cross Country (auto show debut)

==== North American debuts ====
- 2019 Audi e-tron
- 2019 BMW 3 Series
- 2019 BMW 8 Series Coupe
- 2019 BMW X5
- 2019 BMW Z4 M40i
- 2019 Fiat 500X (refresh)
- 2019 Kia Niro EV
- 2019 Maserati Levante GTS
- 2019 Mercedes-Benz A-Class (sedan)
- 2020 Mercedes-Benz GLE-Class
- 2019 Mercedes-Benz Sprinter
- 2019 Mini John Cooper Works Knights Edition
- 2019 Porsche Macan (refresh)

=== Concept cars ===
==== World debuts ====
- Audi e-tron GT concept
- BMW Vision iNEXT (auto show debut)

==== North American debuts ====
- Byton K-Byte
- Byton M-Byte (also shown at CES 2018)
- Mitsubishi e-Evolution Concept
- Volkswagen I.D. Buzz Cargo

== 2017 ==
The 2017 Los Angeles Auto Show was held from December 1 through December 10, 2017. AutoMobility LA, which included auto show press days and vehicle debuts, took place from November 27 through November 30.

=== Production model debuts ===
==== World debuts ====
- Aria Group FXE
- 2019 BMW i8 Roadster
- 2018 BMW M3 CS
- 2019 Chevrolet Corvette ZR1 convertible
- 2019 Infiniti QX50
- 2018 Jeep Wrangler (JL)
- 2019 Kia Sorento (refresh)
- 2018 Lexus RX L
- 2019 Lincoln MKC (refresh)
- 2019 Lincoln Nautilus (formerly MKX) (refresh)
- 2018 Mazda6 (refresh)
- 2019 Mercedes-Benz CLS-Class (C257)
- 2018 Porsche 718 Boxster/Cayman GTS
- 2018 Porsche 911 Carrera T
- 2018 Porsche Panamera Turbo S E-Hybrid Sport Turismo
- 2018 Range Rover SVAutobiography (refresh)
- 2018 Range Rover Sport SVR (refresh)
- 2018 Saleen S1
- 2019 Subaru Ascent
- 2018 Volkswagen Tiguan R-Line package

==== North American debuts ====
- 2019 Audi A8
- 2018 BMW 6 Series (G32) Gran Turismo
- 2018 BMW i3s
- 2018 BMW M5
- 2019 Chevrolet Corvette ZR1 coupe
- 2018 Hyundai Kona
- 2018 Jaguar E-Pace
- 2018 Jaguar XF Sportbrake
- 2018 Jaguar XJR575
- 2018 Kia Niro PHEV
- 2018 Lexus LX 570 two-row
- 2018 Mitsubishi Eclipse Cross
- 2018 Nissan Kicks
- 2019 Range Rover/Range Rover Sport PHEV
- 2019 Volvo XC40

=== Concept cars ===
==== World debuts ====
- Mitsubishi Re-Model A (by West Coast Customs)
- Redspace REDS
- Toyota FT-AC

==== North American debuts ====
- BMW 8 Series (G15) concept
- BMW i Vision Dynamics
- BMW X7 iPerformance concept
- Jaguar I-Pace eTrophy racing prototype
- Land Rover Discovery SVX concept
- Mazda Vision Coupe
- MINI Electric Concept
- Volkswagen I.D. Crozz

== 2016 ==
The 2016 Los Angeles Auto Show was held from November 18 through November 27, 2016. Press days and vehicle debuts took place on November 16 and 17.

=== Production model debuts ===
==== World debuts ====
- 2018 Alfa Romeo Stelvio Quadrifoglio
- 2017 Chevrolet Colorado ZR2
- 2018 Chevrolet Equinox
- 2017 Chevrolet Spark ACTIV
- 2018 Ford EcoSport (facelift)
- 2017 Honda Civic Si (pre-production prototype)
- 2017 Jeep Renegade Deserthawk, Altitude
- 2017 Lamborghini Huracan RWD Spyder
- 2017 Mazda CX-5
- 2018 Mercedes-AMG E63, E63 S
- 2017 Mercedes-AMG GLE43
- 2017 Mercedes-Maybach S650 Cabriolet
- 2017 Mini Countryman
- 2017 Nissan Juke Black Pearl Edition
- 2017 Nissan Rogue: Rogue One Star Wars Limited Edition
- 2017 Nissan Sentra NISMO
- 2017 Nissan Versa Note (refresh)
- 2017 Porsche Panamera (base, 4, Executive series)
- Rezvani Beast Alpha
- 2018 Volkswagen Atlas
- 2017 Volkswagen e-Golf (refresh)
- 2017 Volvo V90 Cross Country

==== North American debuts ====
- 2018 Audi A5, S5
- 2018 Audi Q5
- 2018 Genesis G80 3.3T Sport
- 2017 Infiniti Q60 3.0t Sport
- 2017 Jeep Compass
- 2017 Kia Soul Turbo
- 2017 Land Rover Discovery
- 2017 Mercedes-Benz G550 4×4²
- 2018 Mercedes-AMG GT R
- 2018 Mercedes AMG GT Roadster
- 2018 Smart ForTwo electric drive
- 2018 Toyota C-HR

=== Concept cars ===
==== World debuts ====
- Hyundai Autonomous Ioniq concept
- Jaguar I-Pace EV
- Subaru VIZIV-7
- Volkswagen Passat GT concept

==== North American debuts ====
- Infiniti QX Sport Inspiration
- Mitsubishi eX

== 2015 ==
The 2015 Los Angeles Auto Show was held from November 20 through November 29, 2015. Press days and vehicle debuts took place on November 18 and 19.

=== Production model debuts ===
==== World debuts ====
- 2017 Buick Lacrosse
- 2017 Fiat 124 Spider
- 2017 Ford Escape (refresh)
- 2017 GMC Canyon Denali
- 2016 GMC Sierra Denali Ultimate
- 2016 Honda Civic Coupe
- 2017 Infiniti QX30
- 2016 Jeep Grand Cherokee SRT Night
- 2016 Jeep Wrangler Backcountry
- 2017 Lincoln MKZ (refresh)
- 2016 Mazda CX-9
- 2017 Mercedes-Benz GLS-Class (refresh)
- 2017 Mercedes-Benz SL-Class (refresh)
- 2017 Mitsubishi Mirage (refresh)
- 2016 Mitsubishi Outlander Sport
- 2016 Nissan Sentra (refresh)
- Porsche Cayman GT4 ClubSport
- 2017 Range Rover Evoque Convertible

==== North American debuts ====
- 2017 Alfa Romeo Giulia Quadrifoglio
- 2017 Audi R8
- 2016 Audi RS 7 performance, S8 plus
- 2016 BMW 330e (plug-in hybrid)
- 2016 BMW 7 Series
- 2016 BMW M4 GTS
- 2016 BMW X1
- 2017 Cadillac CT6 Plug-In Hybrid
- 2017 Cadillac XT5
- Honda Clarity (fuel cell vehicle)
- 2017 Hyundai Elantra
- 2017 Jaguar F-Pace
- 2017 Jaguar XE (U.S. specification)
- 2017 Kia Sportage
- 2016 Mini Clubman
- 2016 Mini Convertible

=== Concept cars ===
==== World debuts ====
- 2017 Subaru Impreza sedan concept

==== North American debuts ====
- Honda Project 2&4
- Hyundai N 2025 Vision Gran Turismo
- Scion C-HR
- Volkswagen Golf GTE Sport concept

== 2014 ==
The 2014 Los Angeles Auto Show was held from November 21 through November 30, 2014. Press days and vehicle debuts took place on November 19 and 20.

=== Production model debuts ===
==== World debuts ====
- 2016 Acura ILX (refresh)
- 2015 Audi R8 competition
- 2015 BMW X5 M
- 2015 BMW X6 M
- 2016 Cadillac ATS-V
- 2015 Chrysler 300 (refresh)
- 2016 Ford Explorer (refresh)
- 2016 Jaguar F-Type R Coupe AWD
- 2016 Mazda CX-3
- 2016 Mazda CX-5 (refresh)
- 2016 Mazda6 (refresh)
- 2016 Mercedes-Maybach S600
- 2015 Porsche 911 Carrera GTS
- 2015 Porsche Cayenne petrol V6 & GTS (refresh)
- 2016 Shelby GT350 Mustang
- 2016 Toyota Mirai fuel cell sedan
- Volkswagen Golf R Variant (Europe only)
- 2015 Volvo V60 Cross Country

==== North American debuts ====
- 2016 Audi A6, Audi A7 (refresh)
- 2016 Audi TT Roadster, TTS Coupe
- 2015 BMW 2 Series Convertible
- 2016 Fiat 500X
- 2016 Honda HR-V
- 2016 Kia Sorento
- 2015 Land Rover Discovery Sport
- 2016 Mazda MX-5
- 2015 Mercedes-AMG C63
- 2015 Mini Hardtop 4 Door
- 2016 Volvo XC90

=== Concept cars ===
==== World debuts ====
- Audi Prologue
- Bentley Grand Convertible
- Chevrolet Chaparral 2X VGT
- Chevrolet Colorado ZR2 concept
- Lexus LF-C2
- Scion iM concept
- Volkswagen Golf Sportwagen HyMotion

==== North American debuts ====
- Lincoln MKX concept
- Mini Superleggera Vision
- Mitsubishi Concept XR-PHEV
- Volkswagen Golf R 400
- Volkswagen GTI Roadster
- Volvo "Drive Me" autonomous vehicle

== 2013 ==
The 2013 Los Angeles Auto Show was held from November 22 through December 1, 2013. Press days and vehicle debuts took place on November 20 and 21. The 2013 Connected Car Expo was held on November 19–21.

56 total vehicles debuted at the 2013 show, with 22 of them being world debuts. The following below are production models that debuted.

=== Production model debuts ===
==== World debuts ====
- 2015 Acura RLX Sport Hybrid SH-AWD
- 2014 BMW 4 Series (F32) Convertible
- 2015 Chevrolet Colorado
- 2014 Chevrolet Sonic RS sedan, Dusk
- 2014 Chrysler 300S
- 2014 Fiat 500 1957 Edition
- 2014 Honda Civic (facelift)
- 2014 Hyundai Elantra (facelift)
- 2015 Hyundai Tucson FCEV
- 2014 Hyundai Veloster Turbo R-Spec
- 2015 Jaguar F-Type Coupé
- 2014 Jeep Wrangler Willys Wheeler Edition
- 2015 Lincoln MKC
- 2014 Mercedes-Benz S65 AMG
- 2014 Mercedes-Benz SLS AMG GT Final Edition
- 2014 Mini Cooper
- 2015 Porsche Macan
- 2014 Range Rover Long Wheelbase
- 2014 SRT Viper GTS Anodized Carbon Special Edition
- 2015 Subaru WRX
- 2014 Toyota Highlander Hybrid

==== North American debuts ====
- 2015 Audi A3 sedan, S3 sedan, A3 Cabriolet, A3 Sportback e-tron
- 2014 BMW 4 Series (F32)
- 2014 BMW 5 Series Gran Turismo
- 2014 BMW i3
- 2014 BMW i8
- 2015 Kia K900
- 2014 Lexus CT 200h (facelift)
- 2015 Mercedes-Benz GLA-Class
- 2014 Mercedes-Benz S63 AMG
- 2015 Nissan GT-R Nismo
- 2014 Nissan Juke Nismo RS
- 2015 Volkswagen e-Golf

=== Concept cars ===
==== World debuts ====
- Ford Edge Concept
- Mercedes-Benz Vision Gran Turismo Concept
- Mercedes Benz Concept GLA45 AMG
- Nissan Sentra Nismo Concept
- 2015 Subaru Legacy Concept
- Toyota DAR-V

==== North American debuts ====
- BMW Concept X4
- Volkswagen CrossBlue Coupé
- Volkswagen Design Vision GTI

== 2012 ==
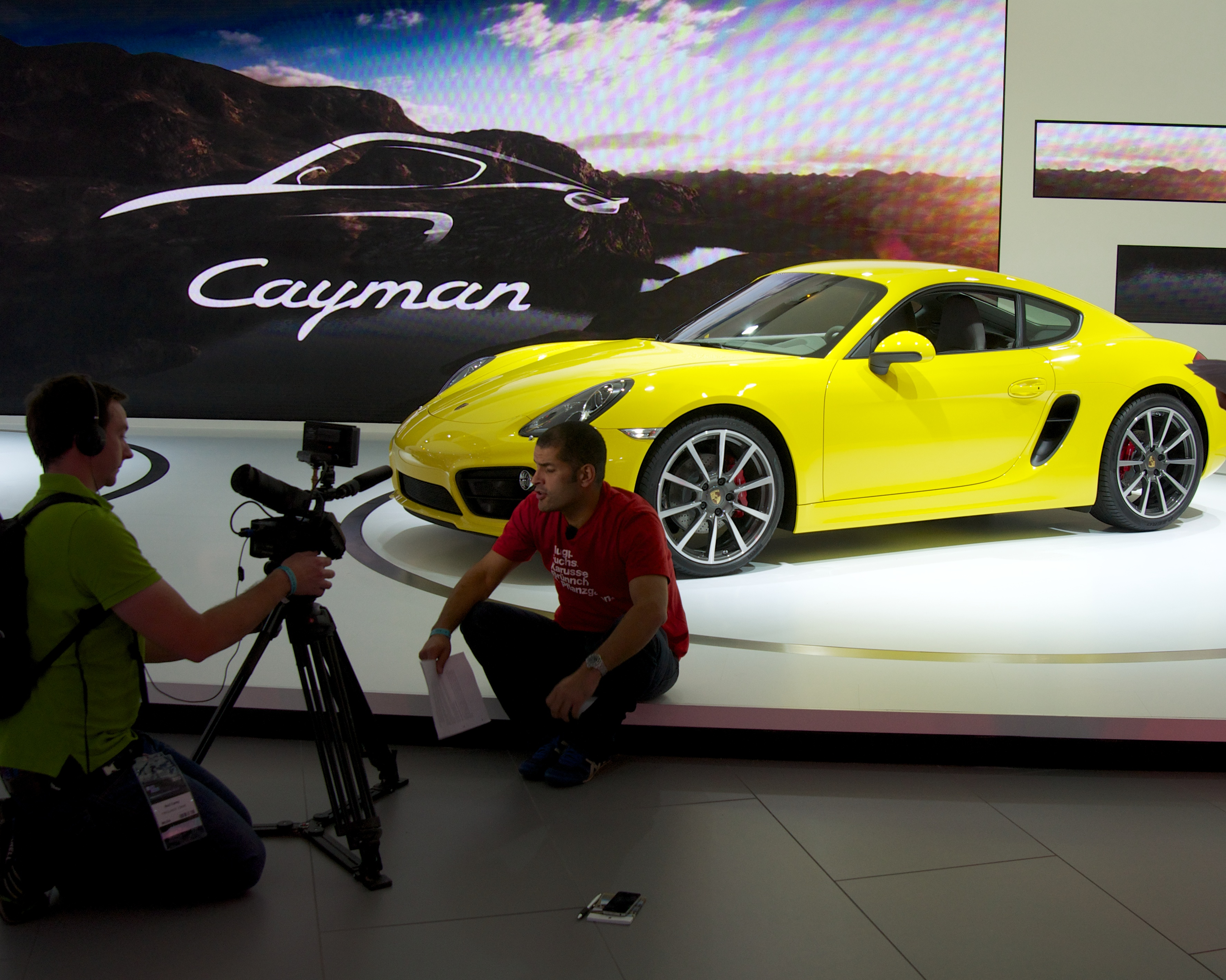
Chris Harris on Cars at the 2012 LA Auto Show talking about the presentation of the Porsche 981c Cayman

The 2012 Los Angeles Auto Show was held from November 30 through December 9, 2012, with press days on November 28 and 29.

=== Production model debuts ===
==== World debuts ====
- 2014 Acura RLX
- 2014 Audi A6 TDI
- 2014 Audi A7 TDI
- 2014 Audi A8 TDI
- 2014 Audi Q5 TDI
- 2014 Chevrolet Spark EV
- 2013 Chrysler Town & Country S
- 2013 Dodge Avenger "Blacktop"
- 2013 Dodge Charger R/T "Daytona"
- 2013 Fiat 500C Abarth Cabrio
- 2013 Fiat 500e e-Sport
- 2013 Fiat 500L Trekking
- 2014 Ford Transit Connect Wagon LWB US-spec
- 2013 Honda Accord PHEV Sedan
- 2013 Honda Civic
- 2013 Honda Crosstour (facelift)
- 2013 Hyundai Santa Fe
- 2014 Jaguar XFR-S
- 2013 Jeep Grand Cherokee SRT8 "Alpine" and "Vapor"
- 2013 Jeep Wrangler Rubicon "10th Anniversary Edition"
- 2014 Kia Forte Sedan
- 2014 Kia Sorento
- 2013 Lamborghini Aventador LP700-4 Roadster
- 2014 Mazda CX-5
- 2013 Mercedes-Benz GL63 AMG
- 2014 Mercedes-Benz SLS AMG Black Series
- 2013 Mitsubishi Outlander Sport Limited Edition
- 2014 Porsche Cayman
- 2014 Subaru Forester
- 2013 Toyota RAV4
- 2013 Volkswagen Beetle Convertible

==== North American debuts ====
- 2014 Fiat 500L
- 2014 Ford Fiesta (refresh)
- 2014 Jaguar F-Type
- 2014 Mazda6
- 2013 Mazda CX-9
- 2013 Mini Paceman
- 2014 Mitsubishi Outlander
- 2013 Porsche 911 Carrera 4
- 2013 Range Rover

=== Concept cars ===
==== World debuts ====
- BMW Concept K2 Powder Ride Concept
- BMW i3 Concept Coupe
- Chevrolet Code 130RS Concept
- Hyundai Veloster C3 Roll Top Concept
- Mercedes-Benz Ener-G-Force
- Smart ForJeremy Concept
- Volvo S60 Polestar Concept

==== North American debuts ====
- Bentley Continental GT3 race car
- BMW i8 Spyder
- Lexus LF-CC
- Nissan Hi-Cross

Honda also announced the 2014 Accord Plug-In Hybrid will be available starting January 15, 2013 in California and New York.

== 2011 ==
The 2011 Los Angeles Auto Show was held from November 18 through November 27, 2011, with press days on November 16 and 17. The Sneak Preview Night was held on November 17, 2011.

=== Production models ===
==== World debuts ====
- 2013 Cadillac XTS
- 2013 Chevrolet Camaro ZL1 Convertible
- 2013 Chevrolet Spark
- 2012 Dodge Challenger SRT8 392 Yellow Jacket
- 2012 Dodge Charger SRT8 Super Bee
- 2012 Fiat 500 Abarth
- 2013 Ford Escape
- 2013 Ford Flex (refresh)
- 2011 Ford Focus ST-R
- 2012 Ford Mustang Boss 302
- 2012 Honda CR-V
- 2013 Honda Fit EV
- 2012 Hyundai Azera
- 2013 Infiniti JX35
- 2013 Infiniti IPL G37 Convertible
- 2012 Jaguar XKR-S Convertible
- 2012 Jeep Liberty Arctic Special Edition
- 2012 Jeep Wrangler Arctic Special Edition
- 2012 Lamborghini Gallardo LP550-2 Spyder
- 2013 Lincoln MKS
- 2013 Lincoln MKT
- 2012 Mercedes-Benz ML63 AMG
- 2012 Mini Cooper B-Spec Racer
- 2012 Mitsubishi Lancer SE AWC
- 2013 Porsche Panamera GTS
- 2013 Shelby GT500
- 2013 Volkswagen CC (refresh)
- 2012 Volvo C70 Inscription

==== North American debuts ====
- Audi R8 GT Spyder
- 2013 Audi S6
- 2013 Audi S7
- 2013 Audi S8
- 2012 Bentley Continental GTC
- 2013 BMW M5
- 2013 Ford Focus ST (production version)
- 2013 Lexus GS 350
- 2013 Mazda CX-5
- 2012 Porsche 911
- 2012 Porsche 911 Carrera S

=== Concept cars ===
==== World debuts ====
- Buick LaCrosse GL Concept
- Ford Fiesta ST Concept (5-door)
- Mercedes-Benz Silver Arrow Concept
- Subaru BRZ Concept STI

==== North American debuts ====
- BMW i3
- BMW i8
- Jaguar C-X16
- Kia GT
- Land Rover DC100
- Volkswagen Beetle R Concept
- Volvo Concept You

== 2010 ==
The 2010 Los Angeles Auto Show was held from November 19 through November 28, 2010, with press days on November 17 and 18. The Sneak Preview Night was held on November 18, 2010.

For the first time, the Design Challenge included entries from international design studios. The objective was to design a four-passenger car weighing less than 1,000 pounds (454 kg). This year's competitors were GM, Honda, Maybach, Mazda, Mercedes-Benz, Nissan, Smart, Toyota, and Volvo. The tied winners were GM with their Cadillac Aera concept and Smart with their 454 WWT concept.

Stefan Jacoby, president and chief executive officer of Volvo Car Corp, kicked off the Los Angeles Auto Show by delivering the Motor Press Guild (MPG) keynote address the morning of November 17, 2010.

The Chevrolet Volt won the 6th annual Green Car Journal 2011 Green Car of the Year award. Other finalists included the Ford Fiesta, Hyundai Sonata Hybrid, Lincoln MKZ Hybrid, and the Nissan LEAF.

=== Production models ===
==== World debuts ====
- 2011 Acura TSX Sedan
- 2011 Acura TSX Wagon
- 2011 Audi Q5 Hybrid Quattro
- 2012 Buick LaCrosse with eAssist
- 2012 Buick Regal GS
- 2011 Chevrolet Camaro RS Convertible
- 2011 Chevrolet Camaro SS Convertible
- 2011 Chrysler Town & Country
- 2011 Chrysler 200 Sedan
- 2011 Chrysler 200 Convertible
- 2012 Coda Electric Sedan
- 2011 Dodge Avenger (facelift)
- 2011 Dodge Durango
- 2011 Dodge Charger
- 2011 Dodge Challenger R/T
- 2011 Dodge Challenger SRT8 392
- 2011 Dodge Grand Caravan
- 2011 Dodge Journey
- 2012 Ford Mustang Boss 302
- 2011 Ford Transit Connect XLT Premium Wagon
- 2011 Hyundai Elantra
- 2011 Infiniti IPL G37 Coupe
- 2011 Infiniti G25
- 2010 Jeep Grand Cherokee Overland Summit
- 2011 Jeep Liberty Jet
- 2011 Kia Optima Hybrid
- 2011 Lamborghini Gallardo LP 570-4 Spyder Performante
- 2012 Mercedes-Benz CLS63 AMG
- 2011 Nissan Leaf
- 2012 Nissan GT-R Black Edition
- 2011 Nissan Murano CrossCabriolet
- 2011 Nissan Quest
- 2012 Porsche Cayman R
- 2011 Range Rover Evoque (5-Door)
- 2011 Saab 9-4X
- 2011 Scion xB Release Series 8.0
- 2011 Toyota Corolla
- 2012 Volkswagen Eos

==== North American debuts ====
- 2011 BMW X3
- 2012 Fiat 500
- 2012 Infiniti M35h
- 2012 Mazda 5
- 2012 Mitsubishi i-MiEV (US version)
- 2012 Nissan GT-R
- 2011 Porsche 911 Carrera GTS
- 2011 Porsche 911 Speedster

=== Concept cars ===
==== World debuts ====
- Cadillac Urban Luxury Concept (ULC)
- GMC Granite CPU Concept
- Ford Focus Race Car Concept
- Ford Focus by Ford Vehicle Personalization
- Ford Focus by FSWerks
- Ford Focus by 3dCarbon
- Honda Fit EV Concept
- Mercedes-Benz Biome Concept
- Nissan Ellure Concept
- Subaru Impreza Design Concept
- Toyota RAV4 EV Concept
- Volkswagen Golf Blue-e-Motion Concept

==== North American debuts ====
- Audi Quattro Concept
- BMW Concept 6 Series Coupé
- Ford Focus ST (pre-production Concept)
- Jaguar C-X75
- Kia Pop
- Mazda Shinari
- Lotus Elan Concept
- Lotus Elise Concept
- Lotus Elite Concept
- Lotus Esprit Concept
- Lotus Eterne Concept
- Volvo C30 DRIVe Electric

== 2009 ==
The 2009 Los Angeles Auto Show was held from December 4 through December 13, 2009, with press days on December 2 and 3. The Sneak Preview Night was Thursday, December 3, 2009. Tickets for this event went on sale in October.

Bentley, Ferrari, Lamborghini, and Maserati did not appear at the show.

=== Production models ===
==== World debuts ====
- 2010 Allard J2X MkII Roadster
- 2011 Buick Regal
- 2011 Cadillac CTS Coupe
- 2011 Chevrolet Cruze (US version)
- 2011 Chevrolet Caprice PPV
- 2010 Dodge Viper SRT10 ACR 1:33 Edition
- 2010 Dodge Viper SRT10 ACR Voodoo Edition
- 2011 Ford F-Series Super Duty
- 2011 Ford Mustang V6
- 2010 Honda Accord Crosstour 4WD
- 2011 Hyundai Sonata
- 2010 Mitsubishi Outlander GT
- 2010 Porsche Boxster Spyder
- 2010 Scion xB RS 7.0 ("Murasaki")
- 2010 Subaru Impreza WRX Limited
- 2010 Subaru Impreza WRX STI Special Edition
- 2010 Suzuki Kizashi
- 2010 Toyota 4Runner V6
- 2011 Toyota Sienna
- 2010 Volkswagen New Beetle Convertible "Final Edition"
- 2010 Volkswagen New Beetle Coupe "Final Edition"
- 2010 Volkswagen Jetta TDI Cup Street Edition

==== North American debuts ====
- 2011 Audi R8 5.2 V10 FSI Quattro Spyder
- 2011 Aston Martin Rapide
- 2010 BMW ActiveHybrid X6
- 2011 BMW ActiveHybrid 750Li
- 2012 Ford Grand C-Max (canceled)
- 2011 Ford Fiesta
- 2010 Hyundai Tucson
- 2011 Kia Sorento
- 2010 Lexus GX 460
- 2011 Lexus LFA
- 2011 Mazda 2
- 2010 Maserati GranCabrio
- 2010 Mercedes-Benz B-Class F-Cell
- 2010 Mercedes-Benz S400 Hybrid
- 2011 Mercedes-Benz SLS AMG
- 2010 Porsche 911 Turbo
- 2010 Porsche 911 GT3 RS
- 2010 Range Rover Sport Autobiography Limited Edition
- 2010 Rolls-Royce Ghost
- 2011 Saab 9-5
- 2011 Volvo C30
- 2011 Volvo C70
- 2010 Volvo XC60 R-Design

=== Concept cars ===
==== World debuts ====
- Capstone CMT-380 Microturbine Hybrid
- Ford Fiesta by Ford Racing and Steeda Autosports
- Ford Fiesta by H&R Special Springs
- Ford Fiesta by Ford Custom Accessories
- Ford Fiesta by 3dCarbon and FSWerks
- Honda P-NUT Concept
- Mazda 2Evil Special Concept
- Mazda Active2 Snow Concept
- Mazda Active2 Surf Concept
- Volkswagen up! Lite Concept

==== North American debuts ====
- Audi e-Tron Concept
- BMW Vision EfficientDynamics Concept
- Lexus LF-Ch Concept
- Mini Coupe Concept
- Mini Roadster Concept
- Mitsubishi Concept PX-MiEV
- Subaru Hybrid Tourer Concept
- Toyota Prius Plug-in Hybrid Concept

GM also held a press conference for the 2011 Chevrolet Volt (shown as a prototype at the 2008 show), announcing availability in California in late 2010, with other markets to follow later.

While Nissan/Infiniti did not hold any press conferences at the LA show, they unveiled the 2011 Infiniti M at an event in Beverly Hills to coincide with the show. The refreshed 2010 Infiniti G sedan was also introduced at this time.

== 2008 ==
The 2008 Los Angeles Auto Show was held from November 21 through November 30, 2008, with press days on November 19 and 20.

Facing a budget crisis, General Motors stated that they would cancel their press conferences and debuts for this year's show. Their current vehicles were still on display, and previously introduced vehicles such as the Chevrolet Volt still made an appearance. Chrysler also did not introduce any new models to the press, although its electric vehicle prototypes revealed in September (Dodge EV, Jeep Wrangler, and Chrysler Town & Country) were on display.

=== Production models ===
==== World debuts ====
- 2009 Aston Martin DBS Automatic
- 2009 Audi Q7 3.0 TDI Quattro Diesel
- 2010 Bentley Azure T
- 2011 Chevrolet Volt
- 2010 Ford Fusion (facelift)
- 2010 Ford Mustang
- 2009 Infiniti G37 Convertible
- 2009 Lamborghini Gallardo LP560-4 Spyder
- 2010 Lexus RX 350
- 2010 Lexus RX 450h
- 2010 Lincoln MKZ
- 2010 Mazda 3 Sedan
- 2010 Mercury Milan (facelift)
- 2010 Mercury Milan Hybrid
- 2010 Mini E
- 2009 Nissan 370Z Coupe
- 2009 Nissan Cube
- 2009 Pontiac G3
- 2009 Pontiac G6 (facelift)
- 2010 Pontiac G8 ST
- 2009 Porsche Boxster (facelift)
- 2009 Porsche Cayman (facelift)
- 2009 Saab 9-3 2.0T Convertible Special Edition
- 2009 Smart Fortwo Brabus
- 2009 Spyker C8 Laviolette LM85
- 2009 Volkswagen Touareg V6 TDI Clean Diesel

==== North American debuts ====
- 2009 Audi A6 Quattro Sedan
- 2010 Audi Q5 3.2 Quattro
- 2009 Audi S4
- 2009 Audi S6 Sedan
- 2009 BMW 750Li
- 2009 BMW 335d
- 2009 BMW X5 xDrive35d
- 2009 BMW Z4 (E89) sDrive30i Roadster
- 2010 Cadillac CTS Sport Wagon
- 2009 Ferrari California
- 2010 Kia Soul
- 2010 Lexus IS 250C
- 2010 Lexus IS 350C
- 2010 Lotus Evora
- 2009 Maserati Quattroporte
- 2009 Mercedes-Benz SL65 AMG Black Series

=== Concept cars ===
==== World debuts ====
- Chrysler Town & Country EV Concept
- Dodge EV Concept
- Honda FC Sport Concept
- Hyundai Sonata Hybrid Concept
- Kia Borrego FCEV Concept
- Jeep Wrangler Unlimited EV Concept
- Toyota Camry CNG Hybrid Concept
- Volkswagen Red Bull Baja Race Touareg TDI

==== North American debuts ====
- BMW Concept 7-Series ActiveHybrid
- Honda Insight Concept
- Hyundai HED-5 i-Mode
- Mercedes-Benz ConceptFASCINATION
- Saab 9-X Air BioHybrid Concept

== 2007 ==
The 2007 Los Angeles Auto Show was held from November 16 through November 25, 2007, with press days on November 14 and 15.

=== Production models ===
==== World debuts ====
- 2009 Chevrolet Silverado 1500 Crew Cab Hybrid
- 2008 Chevrolet Tahoe 2-Mode Hybrid
- 2009 Chrysler Aspen Hybrid
- 2009 Chevrolet Aveo 5
- 2009 Dodge Durango Hybrid
- 2008 Dodge Viper SRT-10 ACR Coupe
- 2008 Dodge Viper SRT-10 ACR Roadster
- 2008 Ford F-150 Limited SuperCrew
- 2008 Ford Mustang Bullitt
- 2009 Honda FCX Clarity
- 2009 Lincoln MKS
- 2008 Lotus Elise California Edition
- 2008 Lotus Elise SC
- 2008 Lotus Exige S 240
- 2008 Lotus Exige S Club Racer
- 2008 Mercedes-Benz C63 AMG
- 2008 Mosler MT900S
- 2009 Nissan Murano
- 2009 Pontiac Vibe
- 2009 Pontiac Vibe GT
- 2008 Toyota Sequoia Limited
- 2008 Toyota Sequoia SR5
- 2009 Volkswagen Jetta TDI

==== North American debuts ====
- 2008 Aston Martin V8 Vantage N400 Roadster
- 2008 BMW 1 Series
- 2008 BMW M3 Coupe
- 2008 BMW M3 Sedan
- 2009 Dodge Journey
- 2008 Ferrari 430 Scuderia
- 2009 Jaguar XF
- Lamborghini Reventón
- 2008 Maserati Quattroporte Sport GT S
- Mercedes-Benz SLR McLaren Roadster
- 2008 MINI Clubman
- 2008 Mitsubishi Lancer Evolution X
- 2009 Nissan GT-R
- 2008 Subaru Impreza WRX STI
- 2008 Volvo V70
- 2009 Volkswagen Tiguan

Also present at the show were the 2009 Cadillac Escalade Hybrid and Cadillac Escalade Platinum, which were originally slated to debut at the Los Angeles Auto Show but instead debuted a week earlier at the South Florida Auto Show in Miami.

=== Concept cars ===
- Audi Cross Cabriolet Quattro Concept
- Hyundai Genesis Coupe Concept
- Mercedes-Benz S400 BlueTec Hybrid Concept
- Suzuki Makai Concept
- Vector WX-8 Concept
- Volkswagen Space Up Blue Concept

== 2006 ==
2006 was the only year where the Los Angeles Auto Show was held twice in the same year. The first one ran from January 6–15, and the second one ran from December 1–10 (press conferences were held on November 29–30). The second event was held in celebration of the Los Angeles Auto Show's 100th anniversary, despite its centennial being in 2007. This was also the first year where the show was held toward the end of the year, and the last one held in January.

=== December 1–10 ===
The Organisation Internationale des Constructeurs d'Automobiles listed this show under their 2006 season. It was also the first year the show has earned an international designation.

==== Production models ====
===== World debuts =====
- 2008 Aston Martin V8 Vantage Roadster
- 2007 Audi TT Roadster
- 2007 BMW Hydrogen 7
- 2008 Buick Enclave
- 2008 Cadillac DTS-L
- 2008 Cadillac DTS Platinum
- 2007 Cadillac STS Platinum
- 2007 Cadillac XLR Platinum
- 2007 Callaway C16
- 2008 Chevrolet Equinox Fuel Cell
- 2008 Chrysler Sebring Convertible
- 2008 Ford Escape
- 2008 Ford Escape Hybrid
- 2007 GMC Acadia
- 2008 GMC Yukon Hybrid
- 2007 Kia Amanti
- 2007 Kia Rondo
- 2007 Lamborghini Murcielago LP640 Roadster
- 2007 Lexus LX 470 Limited Edition
- 2007 Lotus Exige S
- 2007 Lotus Sport Exige Cup
- 2008 Nissan Altima Coupe
- 2007 Nissan Sentra SE-R
- 2007 Nissan Sentra SE-R Spec V
- 2007 Saab 9-3 Sedan 60th Anniversary Edition
- 2007 Saab 9-3 Convertible 60th Anniversary Edition
- 2007 Saab 9-3 SportCombi 60th Anniversary Edition
- 2007 Saab 9-5 60th Anniversary Edition
- 2007 Saab 9-5 SportCombi 60th Anniversary Edition
- 2007 Saturn Aura Green Line Hybrid
- 2008 Saturn Vue

===== North American debuts =====
- Audi R8
- 2007 BMW X5
- 2007 Hyundai Tiburon
- 2007 Ferrari 599 GTB Fiorano
- 2007 Kia Sedona SWB
- 2008 Land Rover LR2
- 2007 Maybach 62S
- 2008 Mercedes-Benz CL 63 AMG
- 2008 Mercedes-Benz S63 AMG
- 2007 Porsche 911 Targa 4
- 2008 Volvo C30
- 2007 Volvo XC90 SE Sport

==== Concept cars ====
- Acura Advanced Sedan Concept
- Chevrolet Sequel Concept
- Ford Explorer Fuel Cell Prototype
- Ford Mustang by Giugiaro
- Honda FCX Concept
- Honda REMIX Concept
- Honda Step Bus Concept
- Hyundai HCD-10 Hellion Concept
- Mazda Nagare Concept
- Suzuki SXBox Concept
- Volkswagen Tiguan Concept

Audi, Volkswagen, and Daimler Chrysler also announced their plans for new BlueTec diesel cars, designed to meet stringent emissions standards.

=== January 6–15 ===
==== Production models ====
===== World debuts =====
- 2007 Chevrolet Aveo Sedan
- 2006 Chevrolet Corvette Z06 Daytona 500 Pace Car
- 2007 Chevrolet Suburban
- 2006 Chrysler 300C Heritage Edition
- 2007 GMC Yukon XL
- 2006 Ferrari F430 Pista
- 2006 Ford Explorer Sport Trac
- 2007 Jeep Grand Cherokee SRT8
- 2006 JEVC Battery-Powered Formula Car
- 2006 Honda Accord Sedan US-spec
- 2006 Honda Civic Coupe
- 2006 Honda Civic NGV Sedan
- 2006 Lotus Exige
- 2006 Maserati Quattroporte Sport GT
- 2007 Mazda CX-7
- 2007 Pontiac Solstice GXP
- 2006 Porsche Cayenne Turbo S
- 2006 Saab 9-3 Cabrio "20th Anniversary"
- 2006 Saleen Sport Truck S331
- 2006 Spyker C8 Laviolette
- 2007 Toyota Yaris Sedan
- 2007 Toyota Yaris 3-door
- 2006 Volkswagen Golf GTI 3-door
- 2006 Volkswagen Golf GTI 5-door

===== North American debuts =====
- 2007 Audi Q7
- 2006 BMW M6 Coupe
- 2006 Bugatti Veyron
- 2006 Fisker Latigo
- 2006 Fisker Tramonto
- 2006 Lamborghini Gallardo Spyder
- 2007 Mercedes-Benz S 550
- 2007 Mercedes-Benz S 600
- 2006 Porsche Cayman
- 2006 Volkswagen Eos

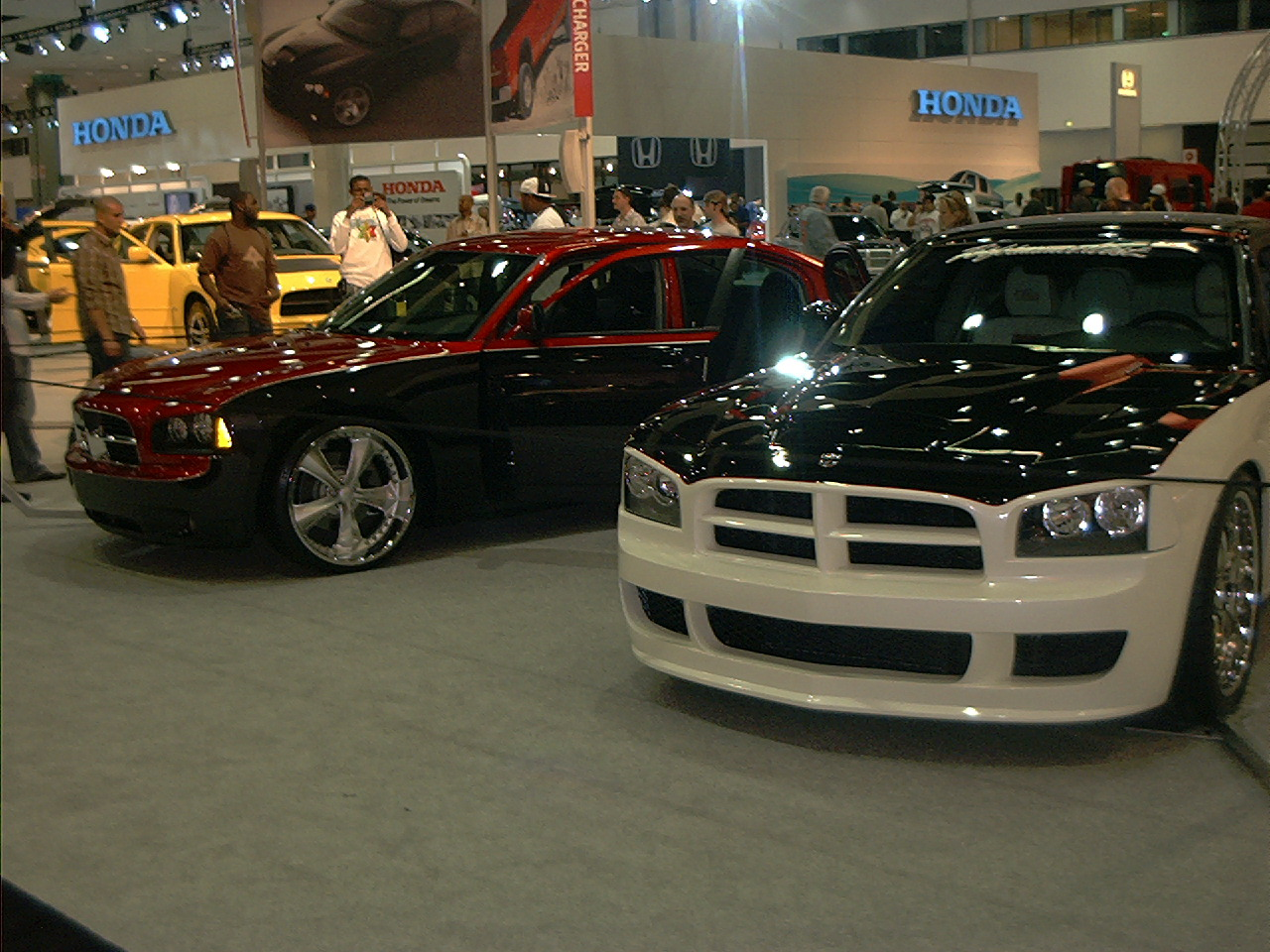
Two Dodge Chargers in the Dodge exhibit at the January 2006 LA Auto Show

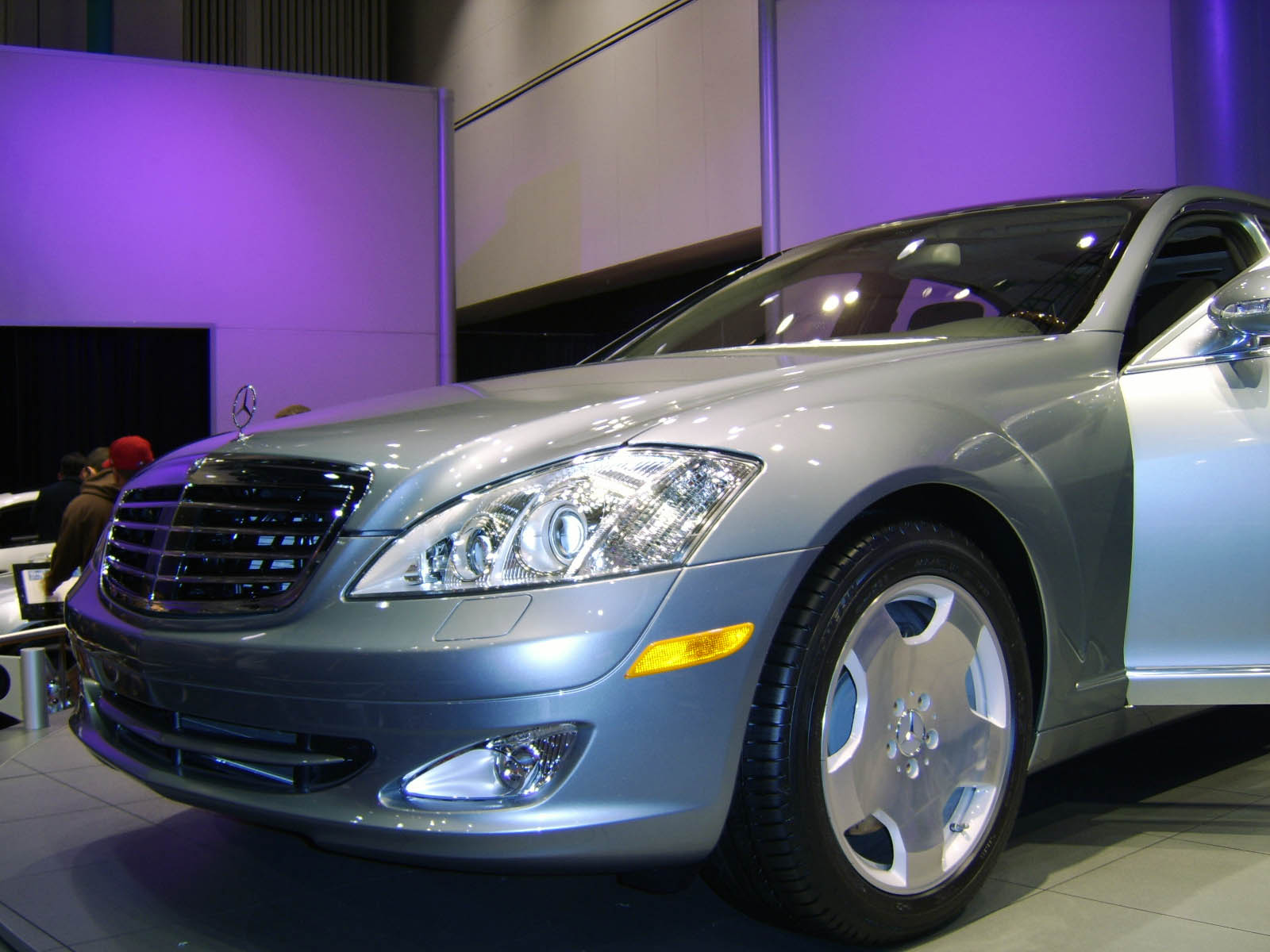
Mercedes-Benz S-Class exhibited at the January 2006 LA Auto Show

==== Concept cars ====
- GMC Pad Concept
- Lamborghini Miura concept
- Saab 9-5 Aero BioPower Concept
- Volkswagen GX3 Concept

== 2005 ==
The Greater Los Angeles Auto Show 2005 took place on January 7–16 at the Los Angeles Convention Center. Some 760,000 square feet of modern, well-lit exhibition space contains more than 1000 vehicles, plus a special floor devoted to the automotive aftermarket.

=== Production models ===
- BMW M3 Coupe Competition Package
- Chevrolet HHR
- Chevrolet Impala
- Chevrolet Monte Carlo
- Chrysler 300 SRT8
- Dodge Magnum SRT8
- Dodge Viper SRT10 Coupe
- Ferrari 575 Superamerica
- Ford Mustang Convertible
- GEM Car EV NEV
- Hyundai Tucson FCEV
- Mazda Mazdaspeed6
- Jaguar XK8 Victory Edition
- Pontiac G6
- Pontiac Solstice
- Pontiac Torrent
- Saleen S7 Twin Turbo
- Spyker C8 Spyder
- Volkswagen Jetta Sedan

==== North American debuts ====
- Audi A3
- Audi A4
- Ferrari F430
- Mercedes-Benz CLS55 AMG
- Mercedes-Benz SLK55 AMG
- Porsche Boxster
- Venturi Fetish

=== Concept cars ===
- Bentley Arnage Drophead Coupe Concept
- Chevrolet HHR West Coast Customs Concept
- Ford Shelby GR-1 Concept
- Suzuki Sunburst Reno SWT Concept
- Suzuki Techno Blue Aerio SX SWT Concept
- Vision SZR prototype
- Volvo XC90 Supercharged V8 Concept

== 2004 ==
=== Production models ===
- BMW 330Ci Performance Package
- BMW X5 4.8is
- Bentley Continental GT
- Bentley Arnage T24 Mulliner
- Brabus Chrysler Crossfire
- Buick Terraza
- Chevrolet Cobalt
- Commuter Tango T600
- Ford Escape
- Ford GT
- Ford Focus
- Hummer H2 SUT
- Lotus Elise
- Lexus RX 400h
- Mazda6
- Morgan Aero 8
- Panoz Esperante GT
- Saab 9-2X
- Saturn Relay

=== Concept cars ===
- Hummer H3T Concept
- Pontiac Solstice Concept

== 2003 ==
The Greater Los Angeles Auto Show ran from January 4–12.

=== Production models ===
- Audi A8 L
- BMW 330i Performance Package
- Chrysler Sebring
- Dodge Stratus Sedan
- Jeep Grand Cherokee (facelift)
- Ford Focus PZEV
- Mercedes-Benz C-Class
- Mitsubishi Lancer Evolution
- Mitsubishi Montero 20th Anniversary Special Edition
- Pontiac GTO
- Scion xA
- Scion xB
- Subaru Baja Sport
- Volvo S60 R
- Volvo V70 R

==== North American debuts ====
- BMW Alpina Roadster V8
- BMW Z4 (E85) Roadster
- Ferrari Enzo
- Maybach 57
- Jaguar XJ

=== Concept cars ===
- Acura RSX Type-S Show Car by Good Guys
- Aston Martin DB AR1 Concept
- Dodge Magnum SRT-8 Concept
- Ford Faction Concept
- Ford Supercharged Thunderbird Concept
- Mazda RX-8 X-Men Car

== 2002 ==
=== Production models ===
- Acura 3.2 CL
- Acura NSX
- Chrysler Crossfire Coupe
- Chevrolet TrailBlazer EXT
- GMC Envoy XL
- Dodge Neon SRT-4
- Hummer H2
- Hyundai Tiburon
- Jaguar S-Type
- Ford TH!NK City
- Infiniti G35
- Lincoln Navigator
- Maserati Coupe
- Mazda MPV
- Mitsubishi Lancer Evolution VII
- Pontiac Vibe
- Toyota Matrix
- Volkswagen Jetta GLI
- Volkswagen New Beetle Turbo S
- Volkswagen Passat W8
- Volvo S80

=== Concept cars ===
- Lexus 2054 Minority Report Concept
- Lincoln Continental Concept
- Honda Model X
- Kia Trophy Truck
- Mitsubishi Montero Evolution Concept

== 2001 ==
=== Production models ===
- Acura RL 3.5
- Acura TL 3.2 Type-S
- BMW M Coupe
- BMW M Roadster
- Cadillac Escalade EXT
- Daewoo Leganza
- Daewoo Rezzo
- Ford Crown Victoria
- Ford Mustang Bullitt GT
- Ford TH!NK Neighbor
- Isuzu Axiom
- Kia Rio Station Wagon
- Mazda Protege MP3
- Mazda Protege Sport Wagon
- Mazda Tribute MM
- Mercedes-Benz C230 Coupe
- Suzuki Grand Vitara XL-7
- Volkswagen Jetta GLX Wagon
- Volkswagen Jetta Wolfsburg Edition
- Volkswagen New Beetle Sport

=== Concept cars ===
- Chevrolet Borrego Concept
- Dodge PowerBox Concept
- Ford Escape HEV Concept
- Pontiac Vibe Concept
- Toyota WiLL Concept

== 2000 ==
Dates: January 8–16

=== Production models ===
==== World debuts ====
- Acura CL
- Daewoo Korando
- De Tomaso Mangusta
- Infiniti QX4
- Ford F-150 SuperCrew
- Kia Spectra GS
- Lexus IS 300
- Lincoln Town Car Cartier L
- Mazda Tribute
- Oldsmobile Aurora
- Panoz Esperante
- Pontiac Aztek
- Porsche 911 Turbo
- Rolls-Royce Corniche
- Saturn SC
- Saleen SR
- TRD Toyota Celica GT-S
- Volkswagen Golf 1.8T
- Volkswagen Jetta 1.8T
- Volkswagen Passat 4Motion

==== North American debuts ====
- Audi TT Roadster
- BMW Z8
- Hyundai Equus

=== Concept cars ===
==== World debuts ====
- Buick Regal Cielo
- Cadillac ElDoRODo
- Ford Focus Wagon Kona Edition
- Ford Mustang Bullitt
- Mercury Mountaineer
- Oldsmobile Profile
- Saturn CV1
- Subaru ST-X
- Suzuki Grand Vitara Platinum
- Toyota Celica Convertible
- Toyota Ultimate Celica
- Volkswagen New Beetle Dune

==== North American debuts ====
- Chrysler Java Concept
- Honda Spocket Concept

== 1999 ==
The Greater Los Angeles Auto Show held this year January 2–10.

=== Production models ===
- Acura 3.2 TL
- Bentley Azure
- BMW 7-Series (facelift)
- BMW M5
- Buick Regal LSe
- Buick Regal GSe
- Chevrolet S-10 TrailBlazer
- Dodge Dakota NHRA Pro Stock Truck
- Dodge Dakota Sport Quad Cab
- Dodge Neon
- Dodge Viper ACR
- Geo Metro 3-door
- Honda S2000
- Isuzu VehiCROSS Ironman Edition
- Lamborghini Diablo VT Roadster Momo
- Lexus IS 200
- Mazda Troy Lee Special Edition B-Series
- Nissan Frontier Crew Cab
- Nissan Pathfinder
- Plymouth Neon
- Pontiac Firebird Trans Am Convertible "30th Anniversary"
- Porsche 911 Carrera 4
- Subaru Legacy Outback

=== Concept cars ===
- Dodge Power Wagon Concept
- Ford Focus Cosworth Concept
- Honda VV Concept
- Jeep Commander Concept
- Lincoln Blackwood Concept
- Mitsubishi Montero Sport CityCruiser Concept
- Saturn SC Performance Concept

== 1998 ==
=== Production models ===
- BMW M Roadster
- BMW M3 Convertible
- BMW 740il
- BMW 750il
- Buick Regal 25th Anniversary Edition
- Cadillac Seville STS
- Chevrolet S-10 Xtreme
- Chevrolet Corvette Indy 500 Pace Car
- Chevrolet C/K Crew Cab Short Box Pickup
- Ford SVT Contour
- Honda Accord EX Coupe V6
- Honda Civic by Super Street Magazine
- Honda Civic by Pacific's
- Honda Civic GX CNG
- Honda Civic by Intrax
- Jaguar XJR
- Laforza Prima 4X4
- Lexus LX 470
- Mazda MX-5 Miata
- Mazda B-Series Troy Lee 4X4
- Mercury Cougar
- Nissan Altra EV
- Plymouth Prowler
- Porsche 911 Carrera Coupe
- Shelby Series 1
- Volkswagen New Beetle

=== Concept cars ===
- Chevrolet Astro Low Rider Concept
- Infiniti I30 Executive Luxury Special Edition (ELSE) Concept
- Lexus Street Rod Concept
- Vision K2

== 1997 ==
=== Production models ===
- AC Propulsion Tzero
- Chevrolet Malibu
- Chevrolet Corvette Coupe
- Chevrolet S-10 Extended Cab
- Chrysler Concorde
- Dodge Intrepid
- Dodge Durango
- GM EV1
- Ford Contour
- Ford Ranger Electric
- Ford Windstar
- Honda EV Plus
- Mercury Mystique
- Mercedes-Benz E320 Wagon
- Nissan Altra
- Porsche Boxster
- Saab 900 SE "Talladega Edition"
- Saab 9000 CSE Anniversary Edition
- Toyota RAV4 EV

=== Concept cars ===
- Ford Taurus Santa Fe Concept
- Honda Insight Concept
- Mercury L'Attitude Concept

== 1996 ==
=== Production models ===
- Aston Martin DB7 Volante
- Bentley Turbo R Coupe
- BMW Z3 Roadster
- BMW 328i Signature Car
- Buick Century
- Buick Park Avenue
- Buick Park Avenue Ultra
- Cadillac Catera
- GM EV1
- Ford F-150
- Ford Escort
- Hyundai Elantra US-Spec
- Mazda MPV All-Sport
- Oldsmobile Intrigue
- Porsche 911 Carrera Targa Coupe

=== Concept cars ===
- Chrysler Sebring Convertible Prototype
- Ford Sport Trac Adrenalin Concept
- Mercedes-Benz AAV Concept
- Oldsmobile Bravada Concept Cure by Todd Oldham
- Toyota RAV4 EV Concept
- Volvo 850 Turbo Wagon by Boyd Coddington & Chip Foose
- Yugo Next Kiddie Ride Art Car
- Yugo Next Tiled Shower Art Car

== 1995 ==
The 1995 Los Angeles Auto Show was held from January 7 through January 15.

=== Production models ===
- Bmw M3 E36 Coupe
- BMW 318ti Coupe
- BMW 750 iL
- Chevrolet Tahoe
- Chevrolet Cavalier Z24 Coupe
- Ferrari 456 GT
- Honda Odyssey EX
- Kia Sephia
- Lincoln Continental
- Mercedes-Benz C36 AMG
- Mitsubishi Eclipse
- Nissan 200SX Coupe
- Nissan Sentra GLE
- Pontiac Sunfire GT Coupe
- Porsche 911 Carrera Coupe
- Range Rover 4.0 SE
- Saleen Speedster
- Suzuki X-90
- Toyota Avalon
- Volvo T5-R Station Wagon

=== Concept cars ===
- Buick XP2000
- Pininfarina Ethos 3 EV

== 1994 ==
=== Production models ===
- Chevrolet Lumina
- Dodge Neon
- Guldstrand Corvette GS90 Coupe
- Guldstrand Corvette GS90 Nassau Roadster
- Honda Passport
- Honda Accord Wagon
- Honda Civic NGV
- Ford Crown Victoria CNG
- Mazda Miata V8
- Mitsubishi 3000GT Spyder
- Mercedes-Benz E300D
- Pontiac Firebird Trans Am "25th Anniversary"
- Plymouth Neon
- Subaru Impreza Coupe

=== Concept cars ===
- Dodge Viper Defender
- Ford Ranger Sea Splash
- Ford Profile
- Isuzu Trooper Convertible
- Kia Sportage
- Nissan Future Vision Vehicle
- Volkswagen Concept One

== 1993 ==
=== Production models ===
- Callaway SuperNatural
- Chevrolet Camaro Coupe
- Chevrolet Corvette Lister Convertible
- Ford Ranger Splash
- Honda CRX AC Propulsion Electric Car
- Isuzu Trooper RS
- Lexus GS300
- Lotus Esprit Turbo
- Mitsubishi Diamante Wagon
- Pontiac Firebird Coupe
- Porsche 911 Turbo 3.6 Coupe
- Saab 9000 Aero

=== Concept cars ===
- Calstart S.E.V. Showcase Electric Vehicle
- Dodge Viper GTS Coupe Concept
- Ford Mustang Mach III Concept
- Ford Ranger Jukebox Concept
- Oldsmobile Aerotech Aurora V8
- Oldsmobile Aurora Concept

== 1992 ==
=== Production models ===
- Mercury Villager
- Ford Probe GT
- Isuzu Trooper
- Nissan 300ZX Convertible
- Nissan 240SX Convertible
- Nissan Quest
- Infiniti J30
- Ferrari 512 TR
- Ferrari 348 Serie Speciale
- Dodge Viper RT/10
- M.C.A GTB (Monte Carlo GTB)
- Mazda RX-7
- Subaru Impreza

=== Concept cars ===
- BMW E2
- IAD Clean Air LA 301

== 1991 ==
=== Production models ===
- Mitsubishi Diamante
- Hyundai Elantra
- Nissan NX2000
- Maserati Shamal
- Subaru SVX
- Acura Legend L
- Mercury Grand Marquis

=== Concept cars ===
- Sterling MG EX-E
- Callaway Twin Turbo Speedster Concept

== 1990 ==
=== Production models ===
- Mitsubishi 3000GT
- Mercedes-Benz 500SL
- Bentley Turbo R
- Toyota MR2
- Toyota Land Cruiser
- BMW 850i
- Lotus Elan Convertible
- Alfa Romeo 164
- Alfa Romeo Spider
- Ford Explorer
- Ford Escort
- Mercury Capri Convertible
- Dodge Stealth
- Dodge Shadow Convertible
- Buick Park Avenue
- Chevrolet Caprice Classic
- Chevrolet Blazer
- Chevrolet Beretta Convertible
- Chevrolet Camaro
- Avanti Touring Sedan
- Acura NSX
- Geo Metro Convertible
- Oldsmobile Bravada
- Pontiac Firebird
- Hyundai S Coupe

=== Concept cars ===
- GM Impact
- Vector W2 Prototype
- Buick Lucerne Convertible Concept

== 1989 ==
=== Concept cars ===
- Chevrolet California Camaro IROC-Z Concept

== 1988 ==
=== Production models ===
- Buick Reatta

=== Concept cars ===
- Ford Bronco DM-1 Concept
- Plymouth Slingshot
- Plymouth X2S

== 1987 ==
=== Production models ===
- Buick Regal Coupe
- Eagle Medallion
- Range Rover

== 1986 ==
=== Production models ===
- Chrysler TC by Maserati

== 1985 ==
=== Concept cars ===
- Saab EV-1

== 1984 ==
=== Concept cars ===
- Bertone Corvette Ramarro

== See also ==
- Green Car of the Year
