= Plymouth Slingshot =

1988 Plymouth Slingshot Concept
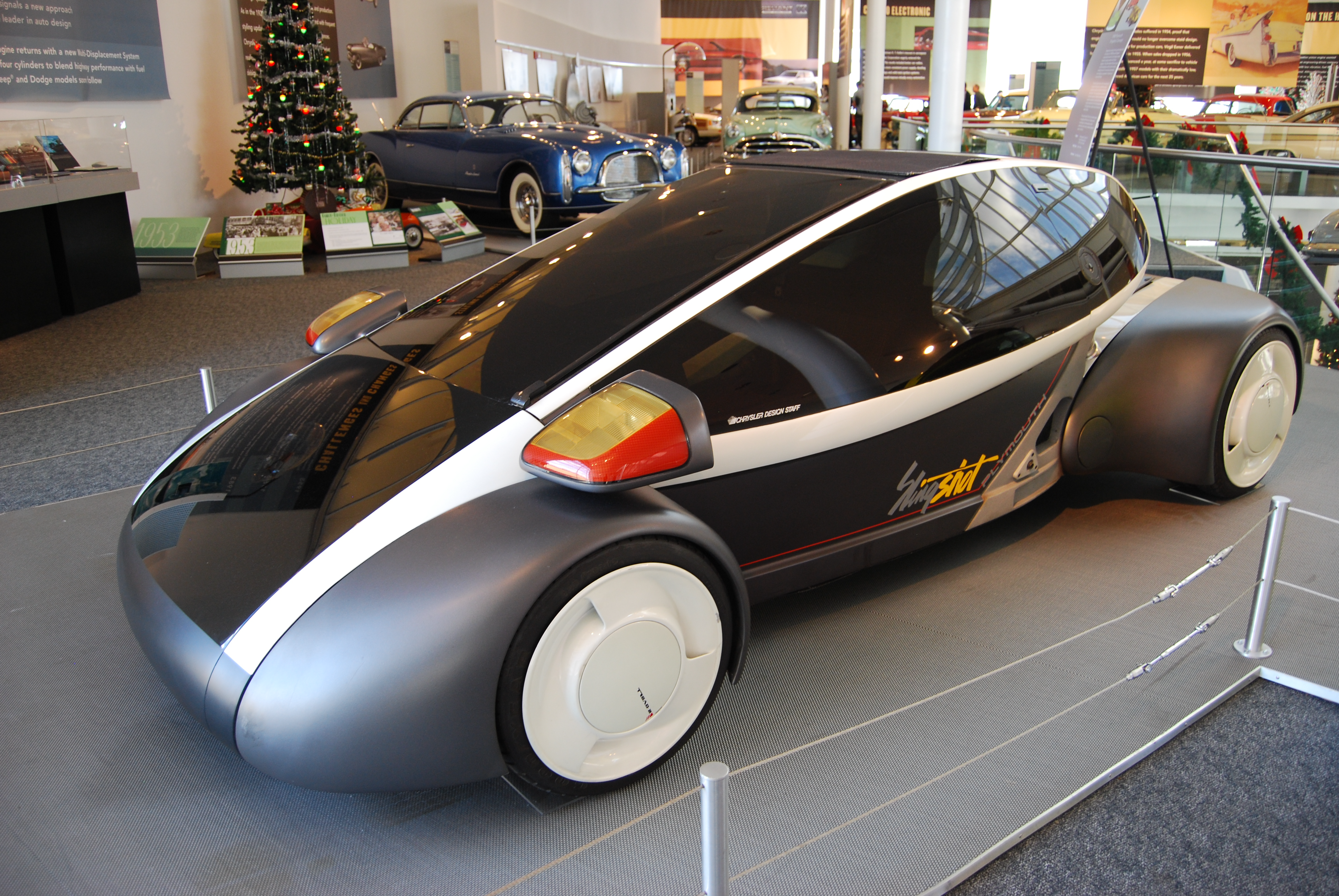

Overview
- Manufacturer: Plymouth (Chrysler)
- Model years: 1988
- Assembly: Gaffoglio Family Metalcrafters
- Designer: Craig Durfey & Roger Zrimec

Body and chassis
- Class: Concept vehicle

Powertrain
- Engine: 2.2L 16-valve turbocharged I-4; 225 BHP @ 6,000 RPM; 225 lb./ft. @ 3,500 RPM
- Transmission: 6-speed manual with ratchet shift

Dimensions
- Wheelbase: 103.0 inches (2,620 mm)
- Length: 149.0 inches (3,780 mm)
- Width: 68.0 inches (1,730 mm)
- Height: 47.7 inches (1,210 mm)

The Plymouth Slingshot is a concept car produced in 1988 by Plymouth. The Slingshot was introduced at the 1988 Los Angeles Auto Show.

== Design ==
The Slingshot was designed by Craig Durfey & Roger Zrimec, along with several design interns working in the Chrysler design studio. These interns were said to have made "direct and meaningful contributions" to the creation of the vehicle. The Slingshot was designed to be a "lifestyle-oriented vehicle purposely targeted at the young people of the 1990s." Slingshot was designed as part of a series of three sports cars from Chrysler—along with the "Big Shot" and "Hot Shot."

== Specifications ==
=== Engine and transmission ===
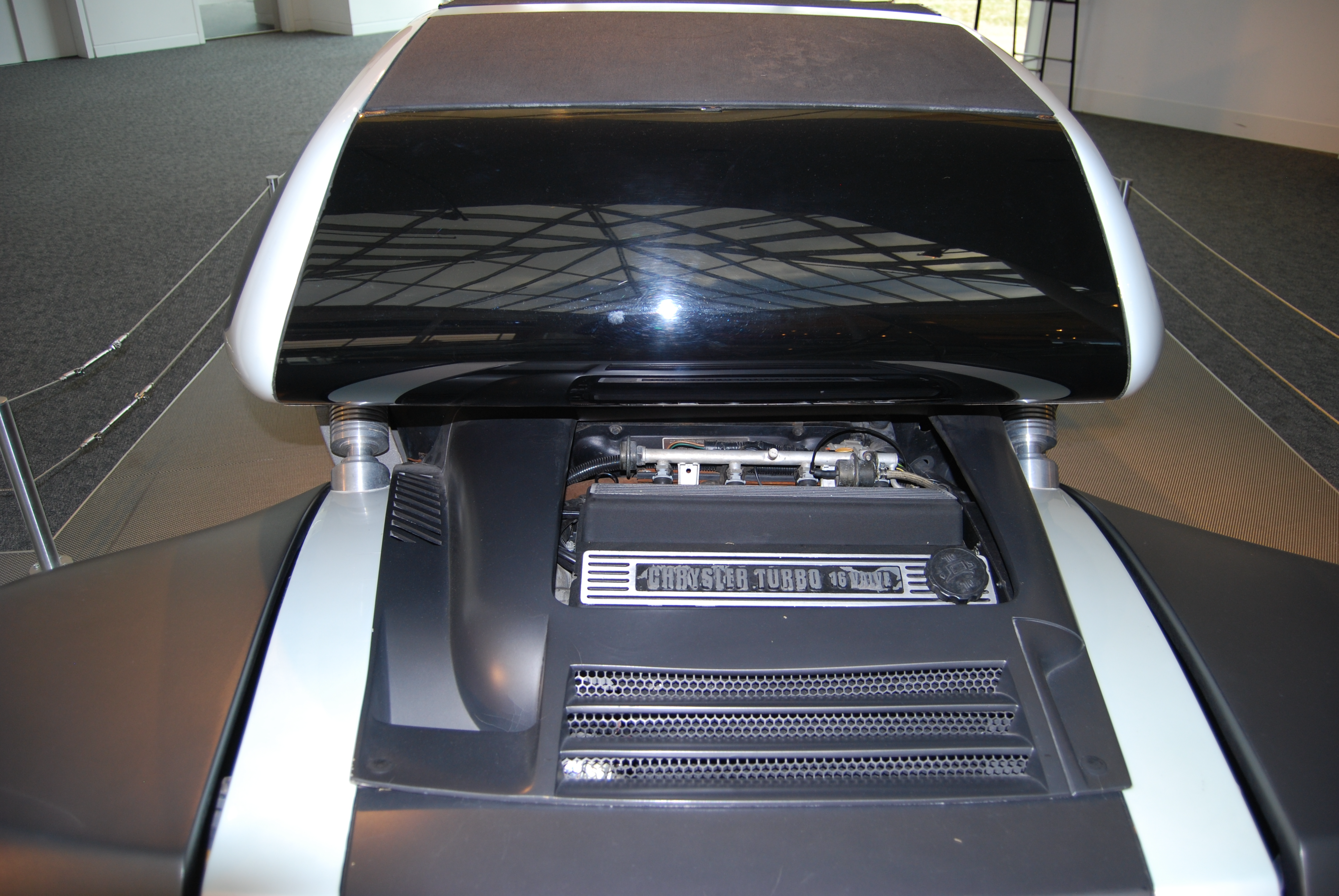
Slingshot's engine.

The Slingshot features a mid-mounted, 2.2L DOHC inline-four engine, with twin cams, 16 valves, and an intercooled turbocharger. The engine was rated at 225 HP and 225 lb/ft. of torque. The engine is located behind the canopy, in a semi-exposed module.

The transmission is a six-speed manual transmission, with a motorcycle-like ratchet shifter.

=== Body and chassis ===
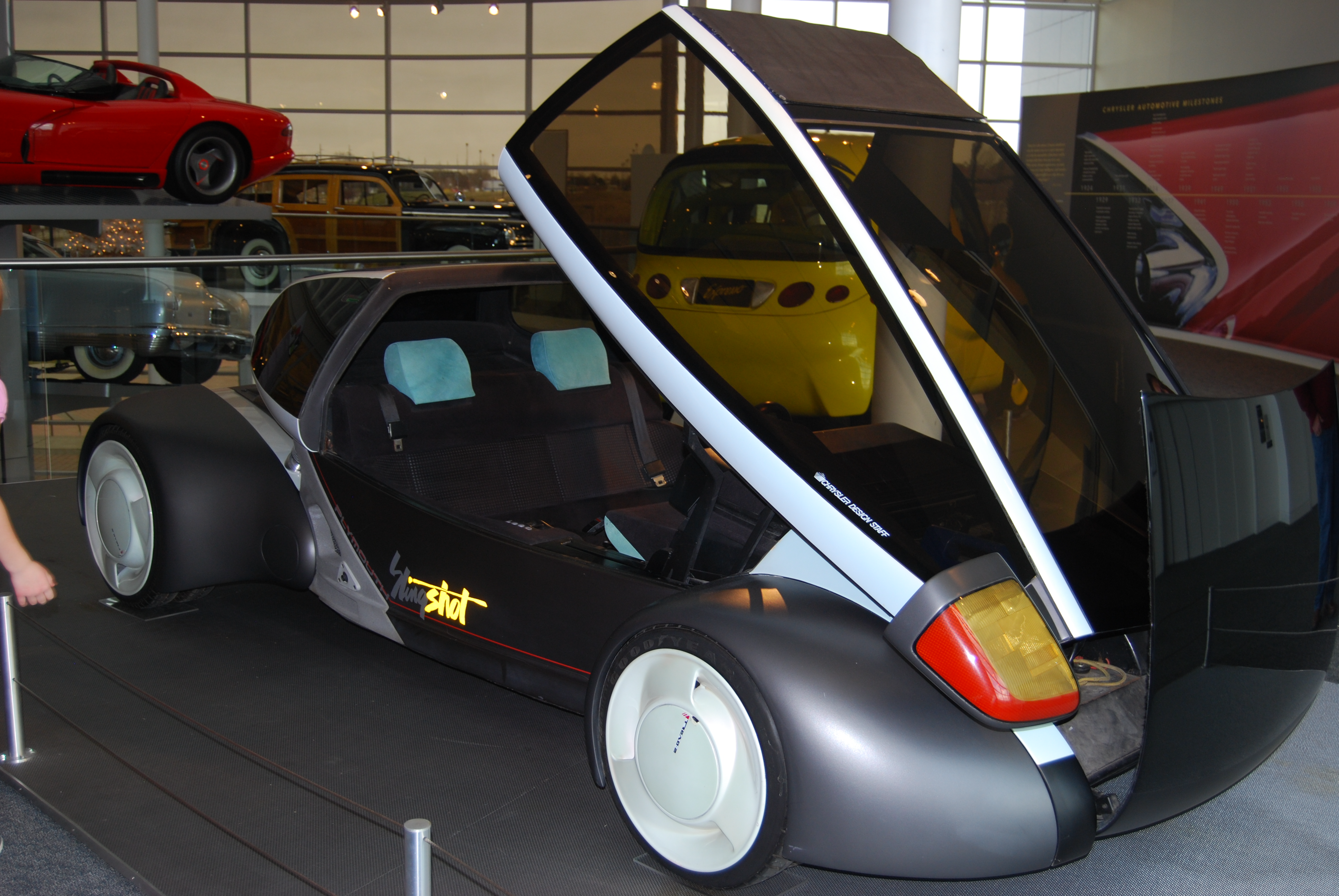
Slingshot's pivoting canopy.

Slingshot is finished in charcoal, black, and pearl white paint. It features a canopy that swings upwards to open.

It has a light and rigid carbon fiber body and chassis, with adjustable four-wheel independent suspension. Flexible, impact-absorbing fenders are positioned right above the wheels to provide aerodynamic styling.

An interesting feature is the use of twin tires at both the front and rear. Slingshot is equipped with 125/70-15 and 125/85-16 tires at the front and rear, respectively. This was to provide an additional safety factor in the event of a blow-out.

The dimensions of the Slingshot are as follows:

- Wheelbase = 103.0 inches
- Length = 149.0 inches
- Width = 68.0 inches
- Height = 47.7 inches

== Features ==
=== Exterior ===
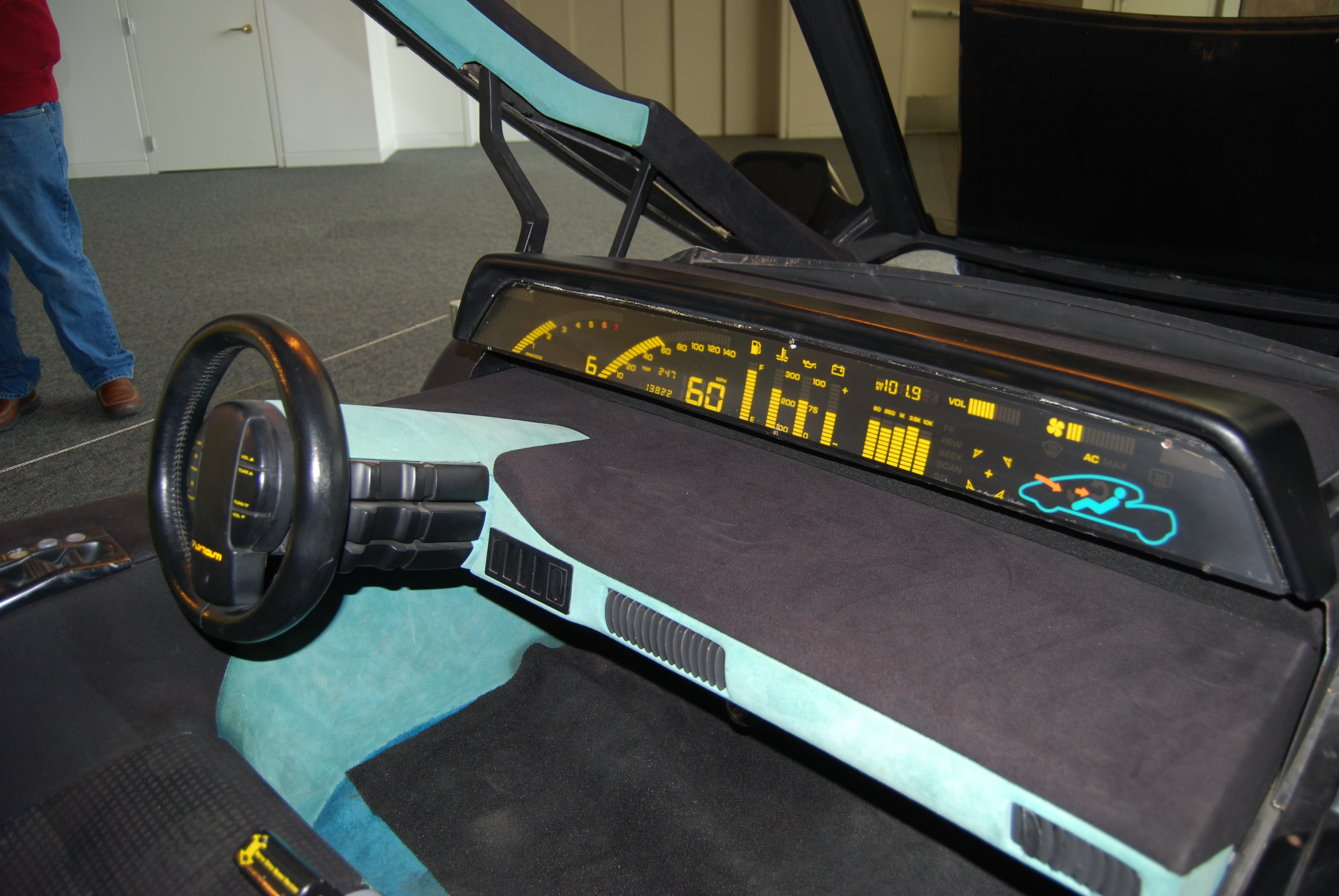
Slingshot's Interior.

- Aircraft-like pivoting canopy.
- Keyless credit card-like entry.
- Combined headlight & rear-view mirror pods.
- Exposed engine and suspension.
- Sliding canvas sunroof.

=== Interior ===
- Elevating seats.
- Sliding pedals, instrument panel & steering wheel.
- Electronic instrument panel.

== Reception and media ==
Slingshot won the 1988 Silver IDEA award for automotive design.

Slingshot was displayed as part of the Walter P. Chrysler Museum's exhibit on "Big Toys" from November 9, 2009, through January 11, 2010.

Slingshot made cameos in several episodes of the TV show Viper during the show's first season.
