= Honda Spocket =

Concept car developed by Honda

Overview
- Manufacturer: Honda
- Production: 1999
- Assembly: Torrance, California
- Designer: Honda R&D Americas, Inc.

Body and chassis
- Class: Concept car
- Body style: 2-door convertible pickup
- Layout: AWD
- Doors: Scissor

Powertrain
- Engine: 1.5 L DOHC I4 (gasoline) + x1 electric motor
- Transmission: 5-speed Tiptronic semi-automatic

The Honda Spocket was a concept car developed by Honda. The car was displayed at auto shows in 1999 and 2000, but was never released as a production vehicle.

The Spocket concept was a convertible with the rear half of the car able to be used for a second row of seats or as a flat floor storage area. It was designed by Honda's California studio, and had a hybrid powertrain with the front wheel driven by a gas engine and the rear wheel by electric motors. It had a wheelbase of 2,750 millimetres (108 in) and a length of 4,270 millimetres (168 in).

Honda showed the concept at the 1999 Tokyo Motor Show, the 2000 North American International Auto Show, and the 2000 LA Auto Show, though it did not go into production.
