= Honda FC Sport =

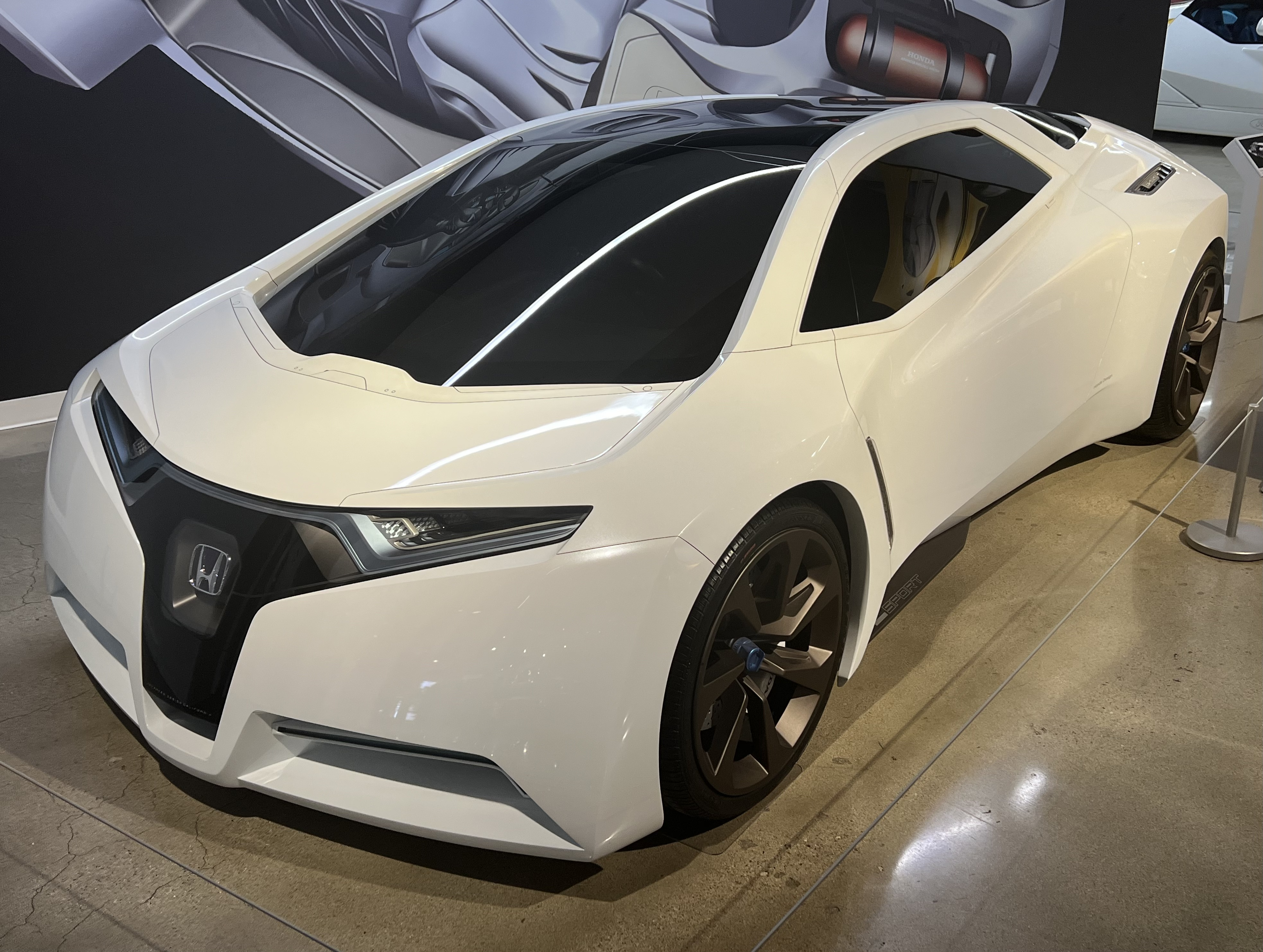

Overview
- Manufacturer: Honda
- Production: 2008

Body and chassis
- Class: sports car
- Body style: 3-seat Coupe

Powertrain
- Engine: hydrogen-powered
- Electric motor: 2x Electric motors on Rear axle

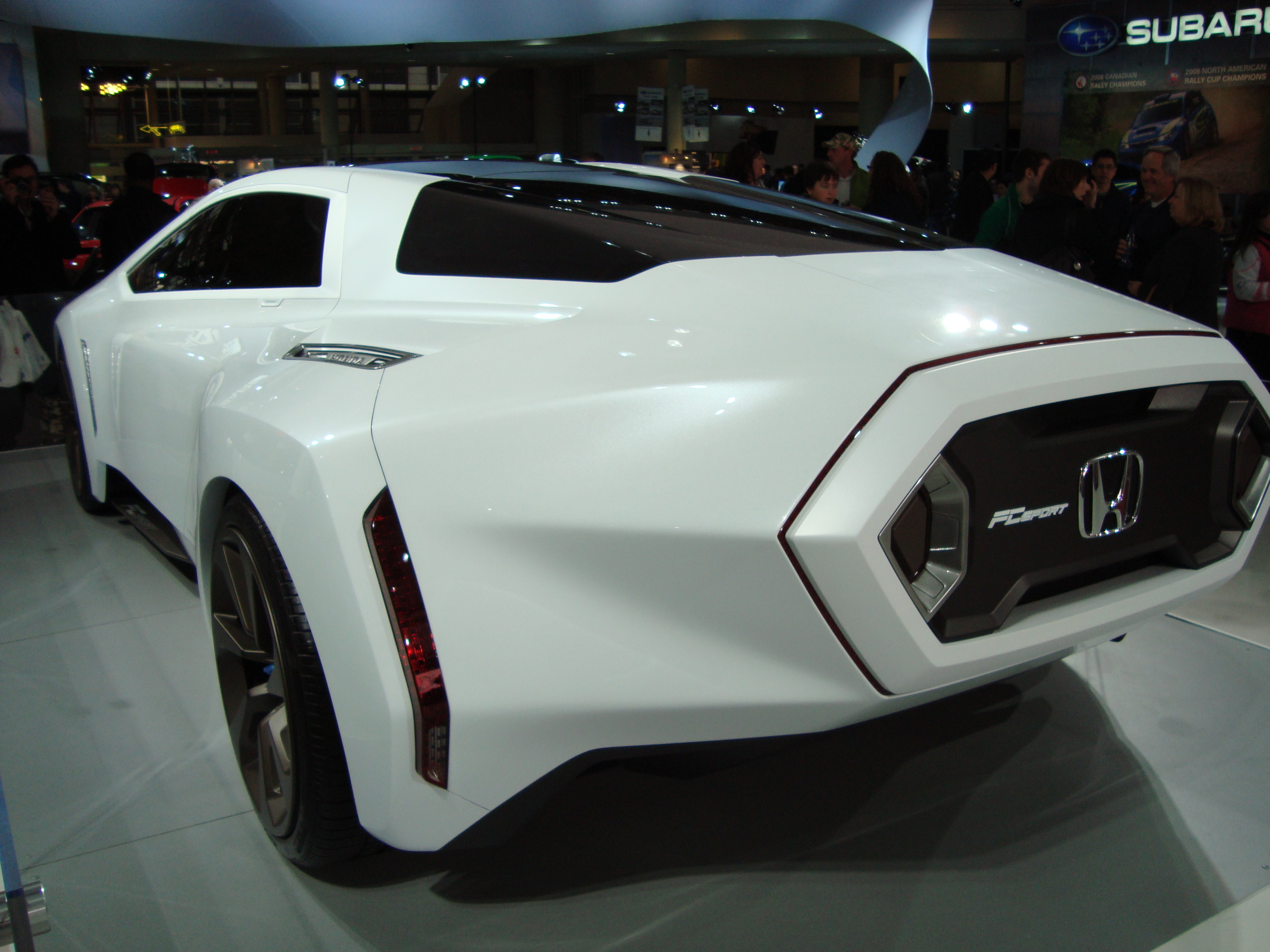
Rear end

The Honda FC Sport is a concept car that was produced by Honda, first shown at the 2008 Los Angeles Auto Show. It was described as a design study and was intended to show what a hydrogen powered sports car might look like. The FC Sport was designed for a drivetrain similar to the one found in the Honda FCX Clarity. Though the concept did not have an actual interior, Honda has stated the theoretical interior would be similar to the McLaren F1, with the driver in the center and a passenger on each side.
