= Mitsubishi Concept PX-MiEV =

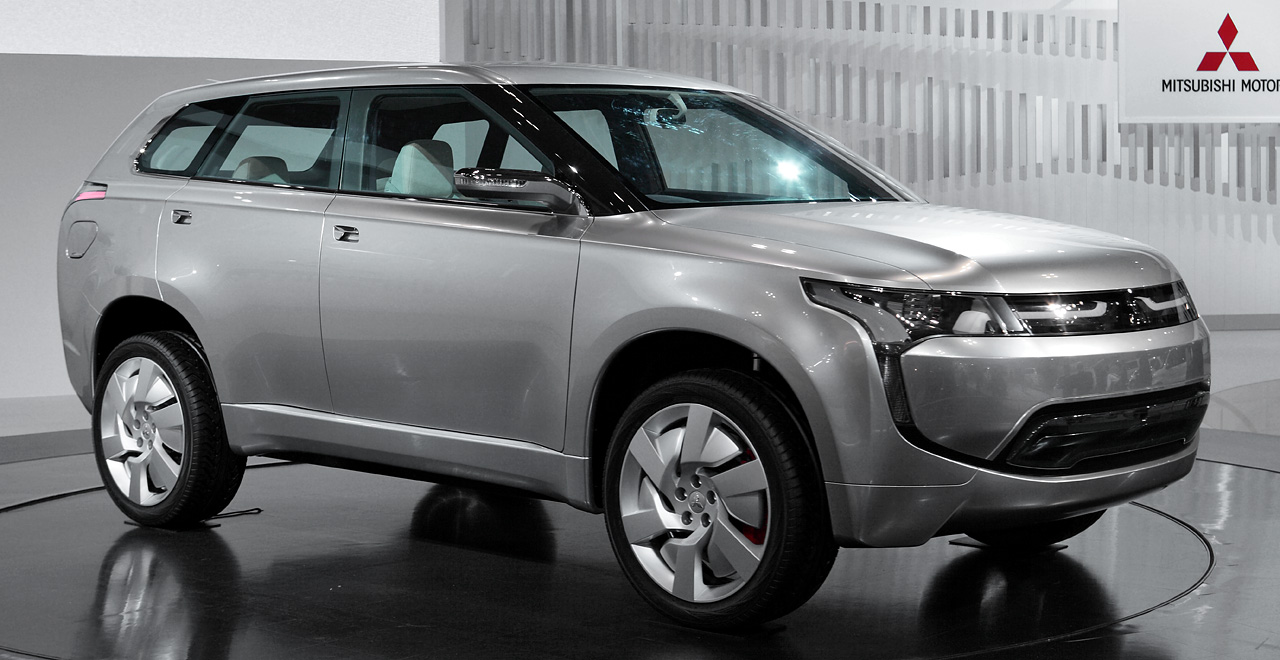

Overview
- Manufacturer: Mitsubishi Motors

Body and chassis
- Class: CUV
- Related: Mitsubishi Outlander PHEV

Powertrain
- Engine: 1.6 L gasoline engine, 2× electric motors

Dimensions
- Wheelbase: 2,630 mm (103.5 in)
- Length: 4,510 mm (177.6 in)
- Width: 1,830 mm (72.0 in)
- Height: 1,655 mm (65.2 in)

The Mitsubishi Concept PX-MiEV is a prototype plug-in hybrid crossover utility vehicle, first exhibited at the Tokyo Motor Show in September 2009. It uses an 85 kW (116 PS; 114 hp) 1.6-litre gasoline engine as a powerplant and generator for two 30 kW electric motors, one on each axle. Mitsubishi claims it to be capable of up to 50 kilometres per litre (141 mpg_{‑imp}; 118 mpg_{‑US}) under optimal driving conditions.

The vehicle's exterior styling supposedly gives clues to the design of the third generation of Mitsubishi Outlander, as well as showcasing some technologies which could make it into production.

The Concept PX was also exhibited at the Los Angeles Auto Show in November 2009 and the Geneva Motor Show in March 2010.

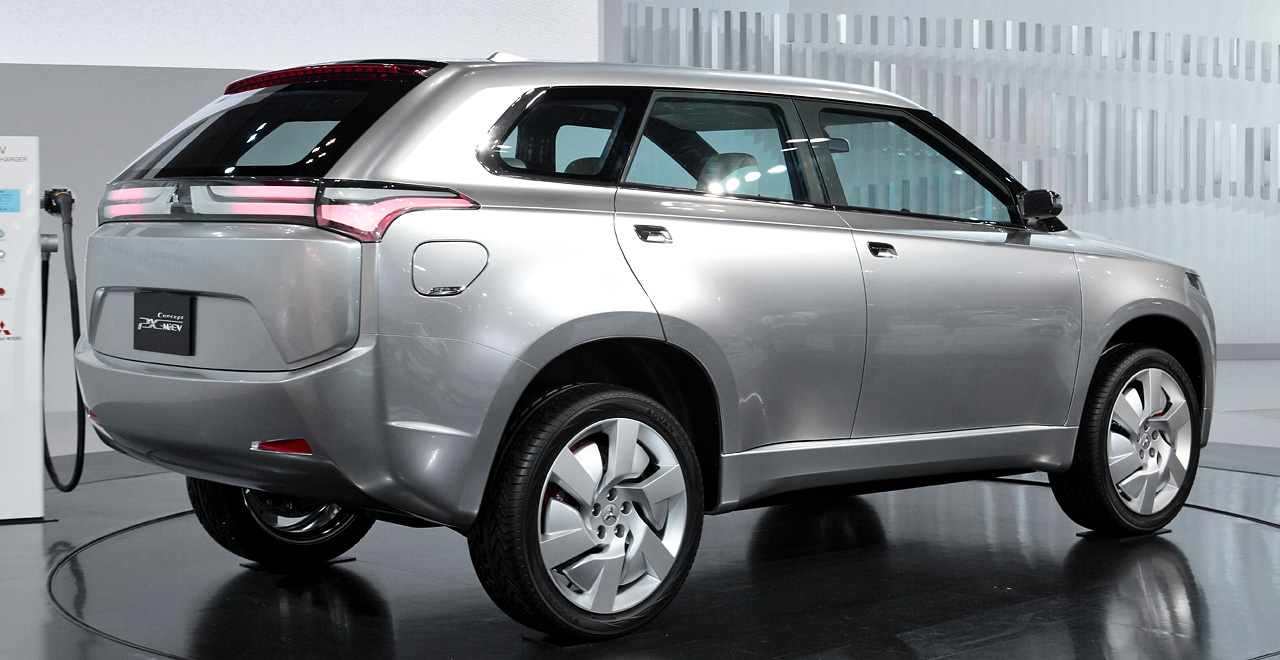
Mitsubishi Concept PX MiEV

== Concept PX-MiEV II ==
At the 2011 Tokyo Motor Show, Mitsubishi unveiled the Concept PX-MiEV II, which is a follow-up to the PX-MiEV study first shown at the 2009 Tokyo Motor Show. Compared with the original concept, it has a higher roofline, more practical and larger side mirrors, more conventional looking alloy wheels, lights and bumper designs. The concept has a larger 2.0-litre MIVEC engine rated at 70 kW (95 PS; 94 hp). It also has a pair of electric motors at both front and rear, delivering an output of 60 kW (82 PS; 80 hp) each.

== See also ==
- Mitsubishi Outlander PHEV
