= Ford Explorer Fuel Cell Prototype =

Ford Explorer Fuel Cell Prototype is a hydrogen car based on the standard Ford Explorer. The car was introduced at the 2007 Greater Los Angeles Auto Show, which was held in November 2006.

== Specifications ==
- The car can hold a maximum of 10 kg of hydrogen compressed to 700 bars giving this SUV vehicle a range of up to 350 miles (563 km).
- Weight 2,560 kg (5,644 lb)
- Seats for 6 passengers
- Powered by 60 kW Fuel Cell delivered by Ballard
- Two 65 kW Electric motors totaling 130 kW
- 50 kW hybrid battery
- 0-60 mph in about 18 seconds
- 87 mph (140 km/h) max speed

Hydrogen storage in the bigger sized center tunnel, replacing the six speed automatic gear
