= MINI Vision Urbanaut =

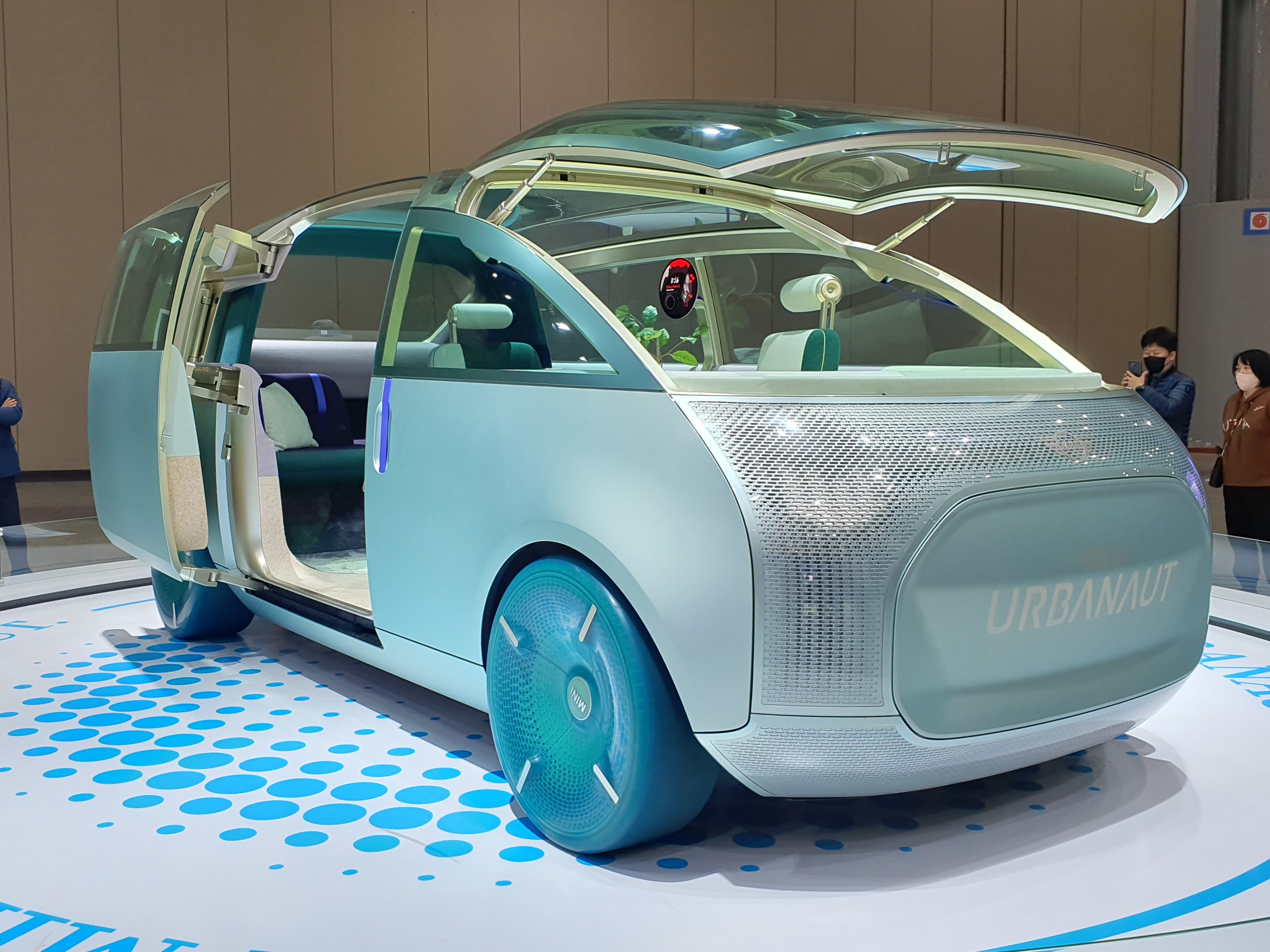

Overview
- Production: 2021
- Designer: Adrian van Hooydonk (design chief)

Body and chassis
- Body style: MPV

Dimensions
- Length: 4,460 mm (175.6 in)

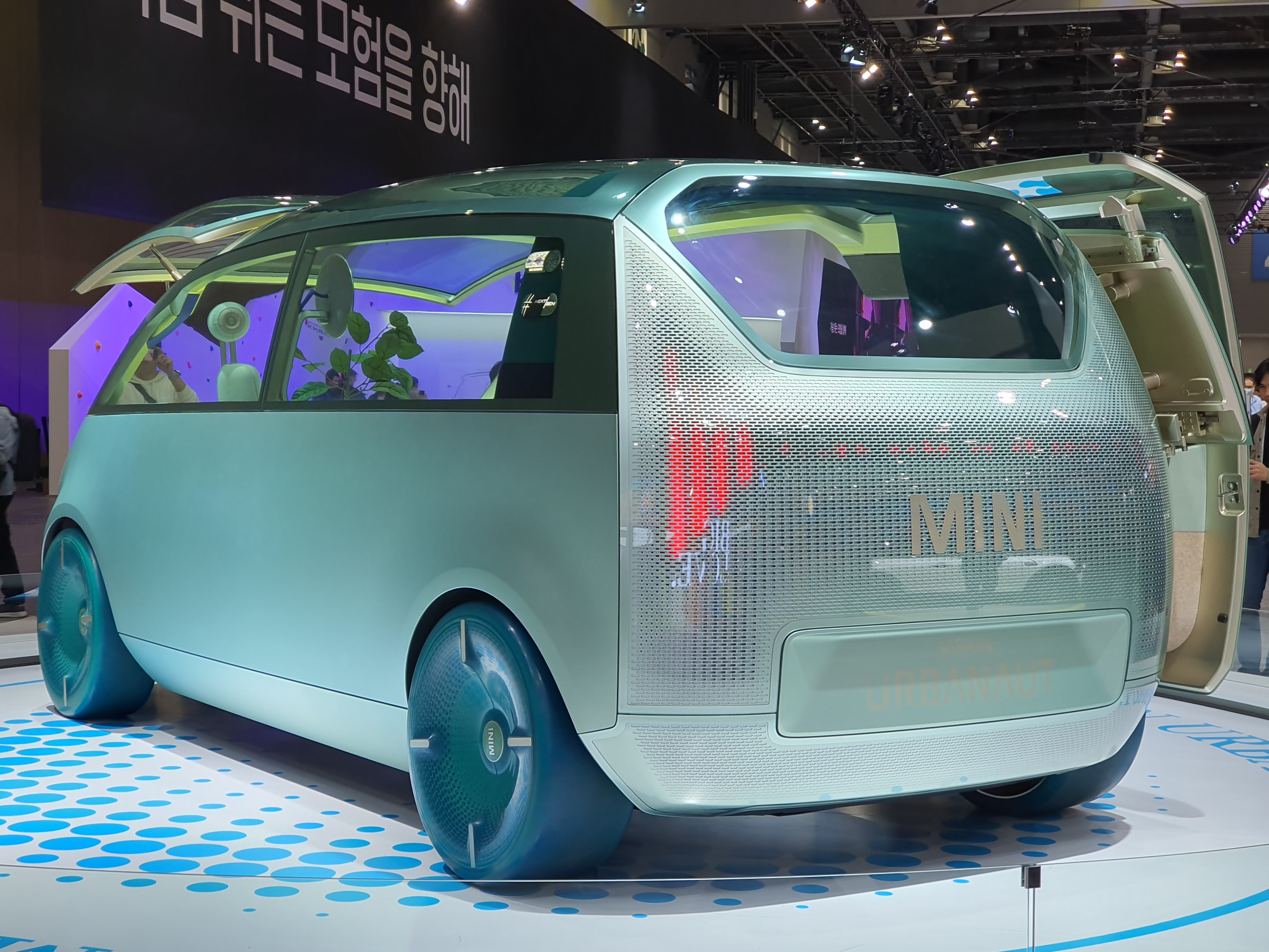
Rear view

The MINI Vision Urbanaut is a concept car developed by MINI. Initially introduced as a digital concept in November 2020, a physical prototype was unveiled at the DLD Summer conference in July 2021.
