= Oldsmobile Profile =

Overview
- Manufacturer: Oldsmobile (General Motors)
- Production: 2000 (Concept car)

Body and chassis
- Class: Compact Wagon
- Body style: 5-door Wagon
- Layout: Front-engine, all-wheel-drive

Powertrain
- Engine: 3.5 L V6 supercharger

The Oldsmobile Profile was a 2000 concept car built by Oldsmobile. The Profile was a compact wagon, with rear sliding doors and 5 seats. The Profile came with a supercharged 3.5 L V6 engine with 250 horsepower, all-wheel drive, and traction control. The gear selector was a dash-mounted rotary knob, freeing up the console for storage. The transmission could be shifted manually by using steering wheel-mounted buttons. A "smart card" keyless ignition system performed all personal driver adjustments including seat, radio, mirror and steering wheel when activated by the driver. Along with many other innovative features, was hands-free phone communication, Internet, on-board vehicle diagnostics and a DVD entertainment system with headrest displays for rear seat passengers.
