= Land Rover DC100 =

Land Rover DC100 Land Rover DC100 Sport
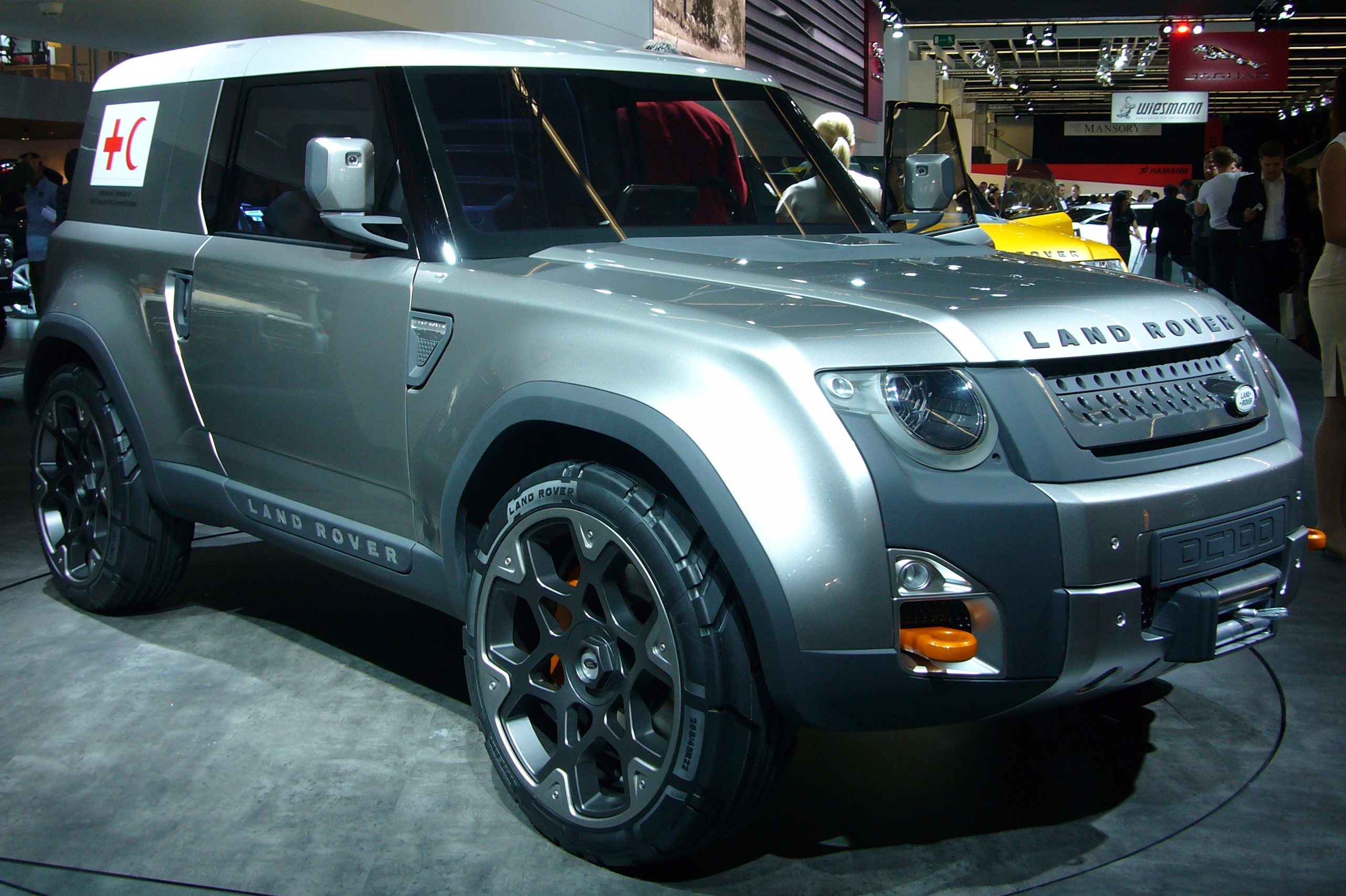

Overview
- Designer: Gerry McGovern

Body and chassis
- Class: concept car
- Body style: 2-door Compact Off-road Concept Vehicle
- Layout: Front engine, four-wheel drive

Powertrain
- Engine: 2.0L I-4 Diesel, 2.0 Litre I-4 Petrol
- Transmission: 8-speed automatic

Dimensions
- Wheelbase: 2,540 mm (100 in)
- Length: 4,300 mm (169.3 in)
- Width: 2,057 mm (81.0 in)
- Height: 1,829 mm (72.0 in)

The Land Rover DC100 (Defender Concept 100") is an off-road concept vehicle from Land Rover originally intended to demonstrate what the vehicle that replaces the long-running Defender in 2020. The DC100 was first unveiled to the public in September 2011 at the Frankfurt Motor Show.

== Versions ==
Land Rover showed two versions at Frankfurt, a three-door panel off road car powered by a diesel engine and a more leisure orientated two-door Sport version with no roof powered by a petrol engine. A closed top SUV version was shown at the Geneva International Motor Show the following year and later an Expedition version.

The design was led by Gerry McGovern, director of design for Land Rover.

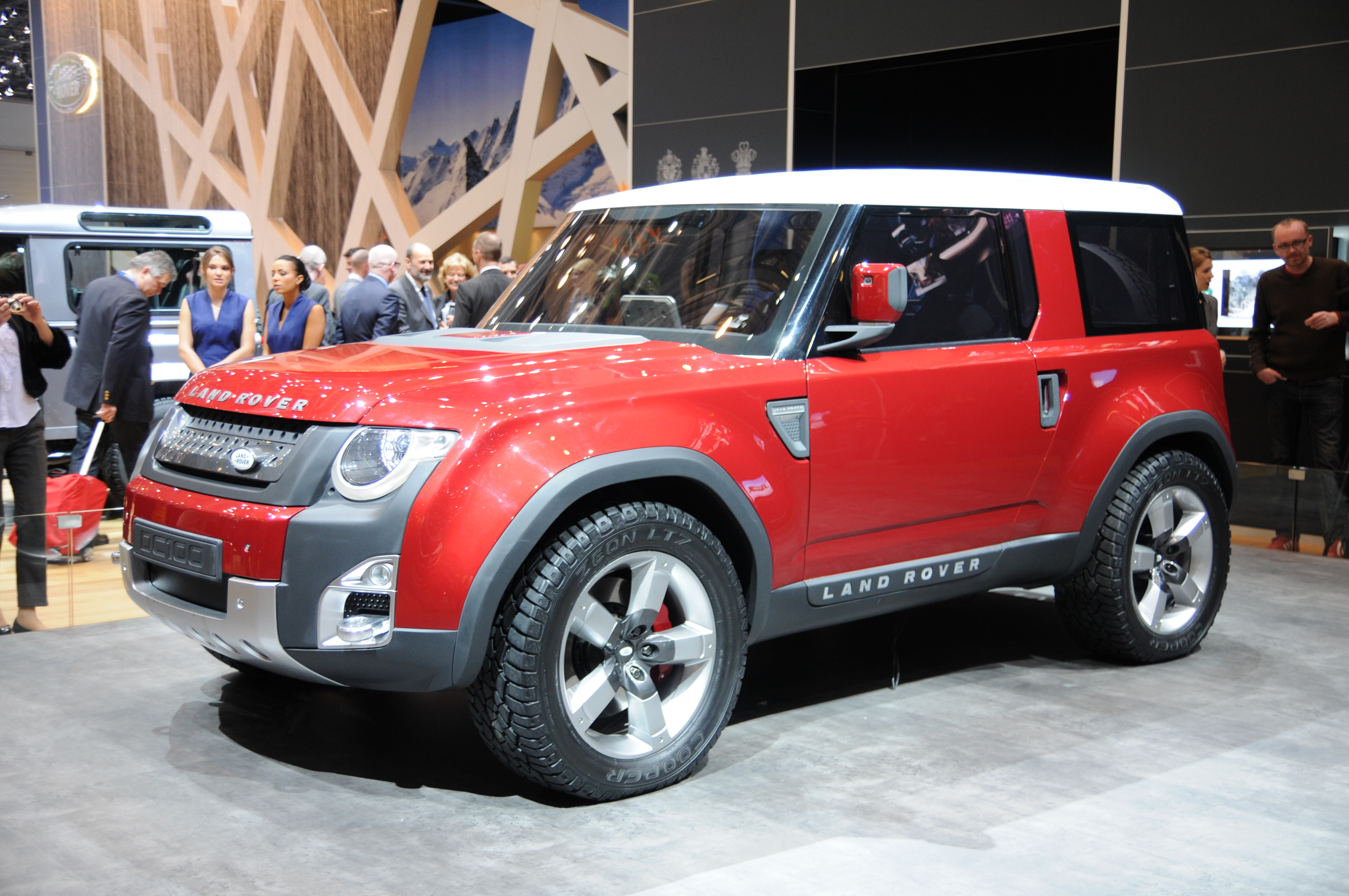
SUV version at Geneva International Motor Show 2012

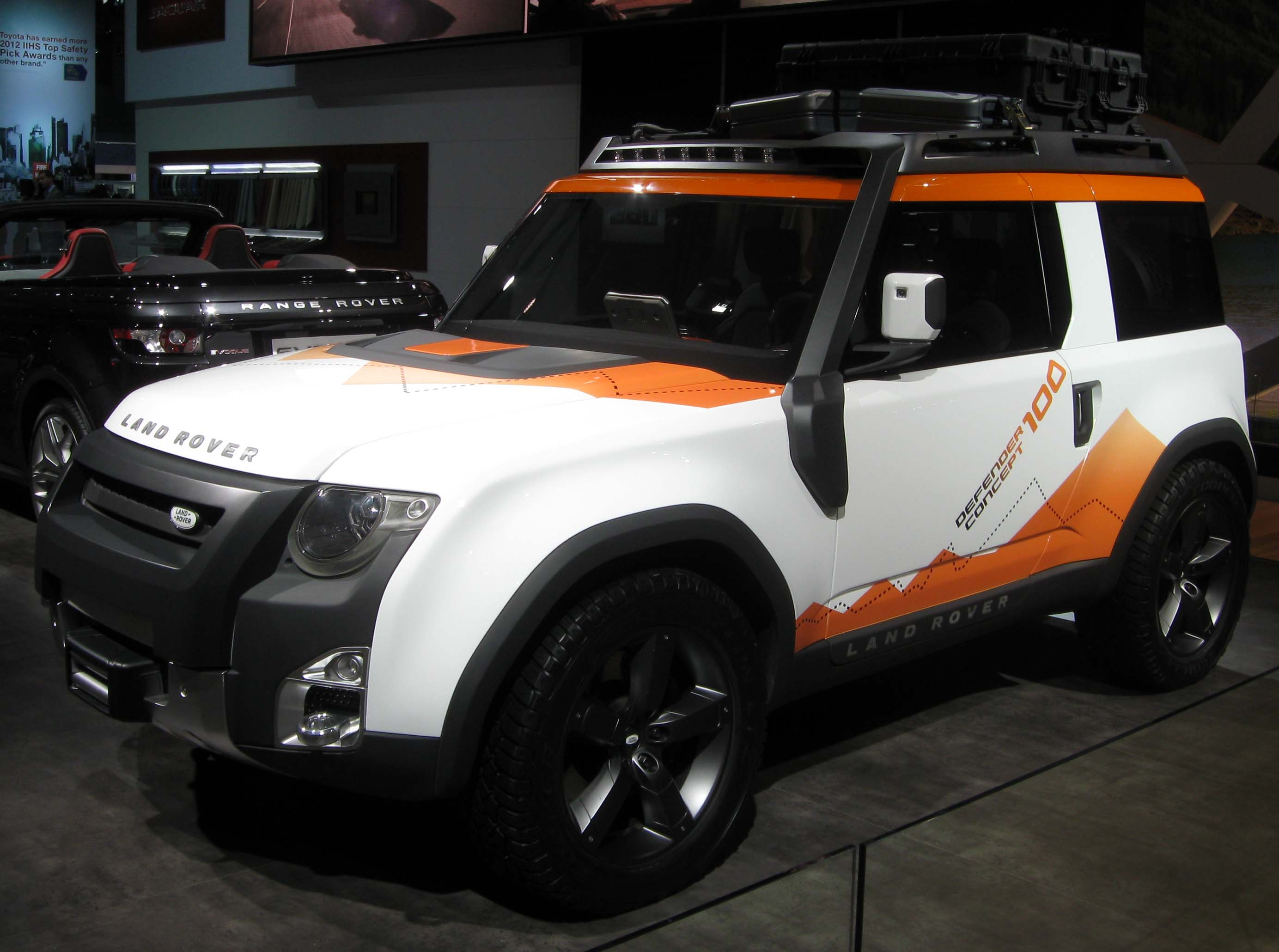
Defender 100 Expedition Concept at NYIAS 2012

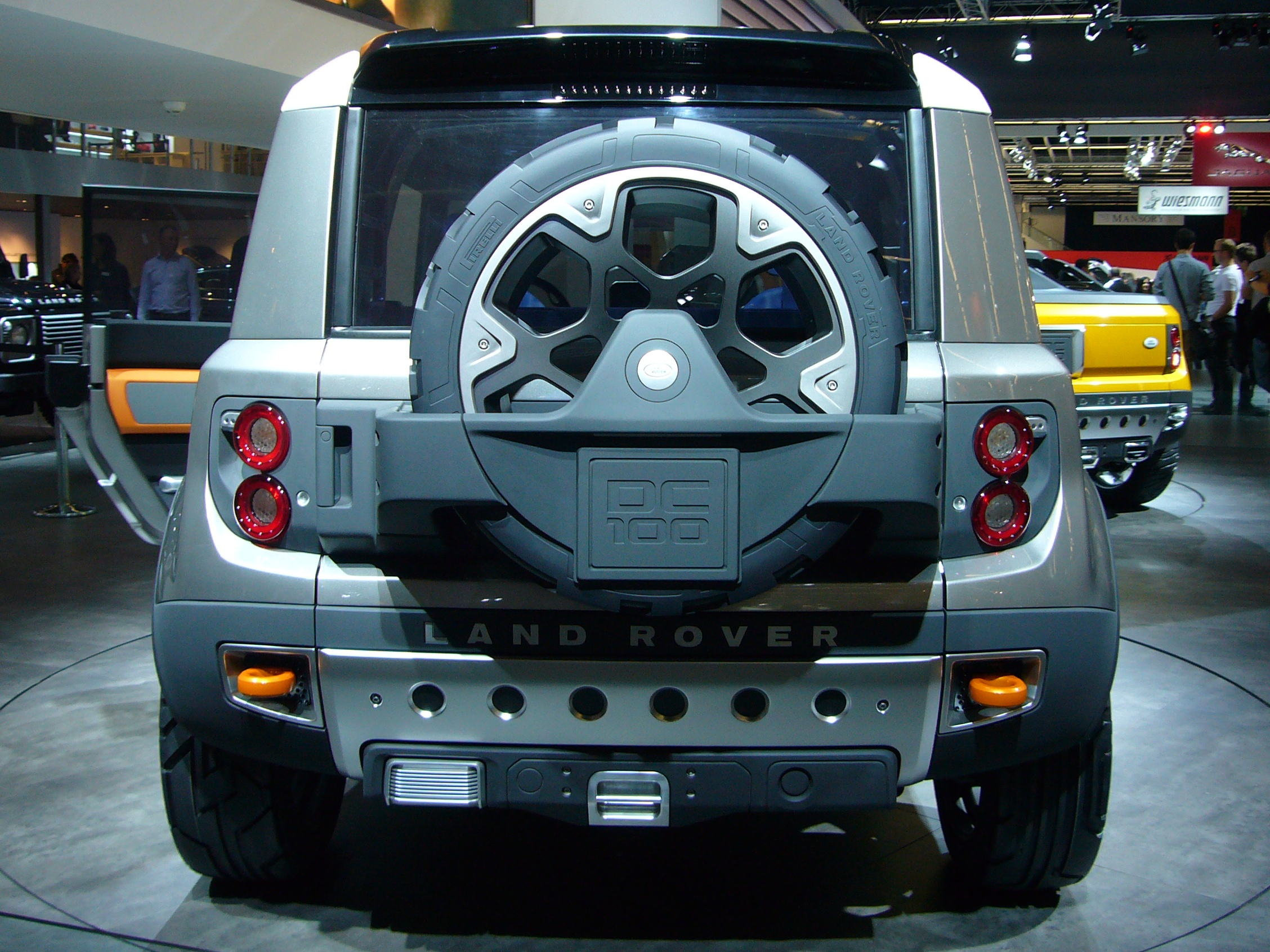
Land Rover DC100- Rear view

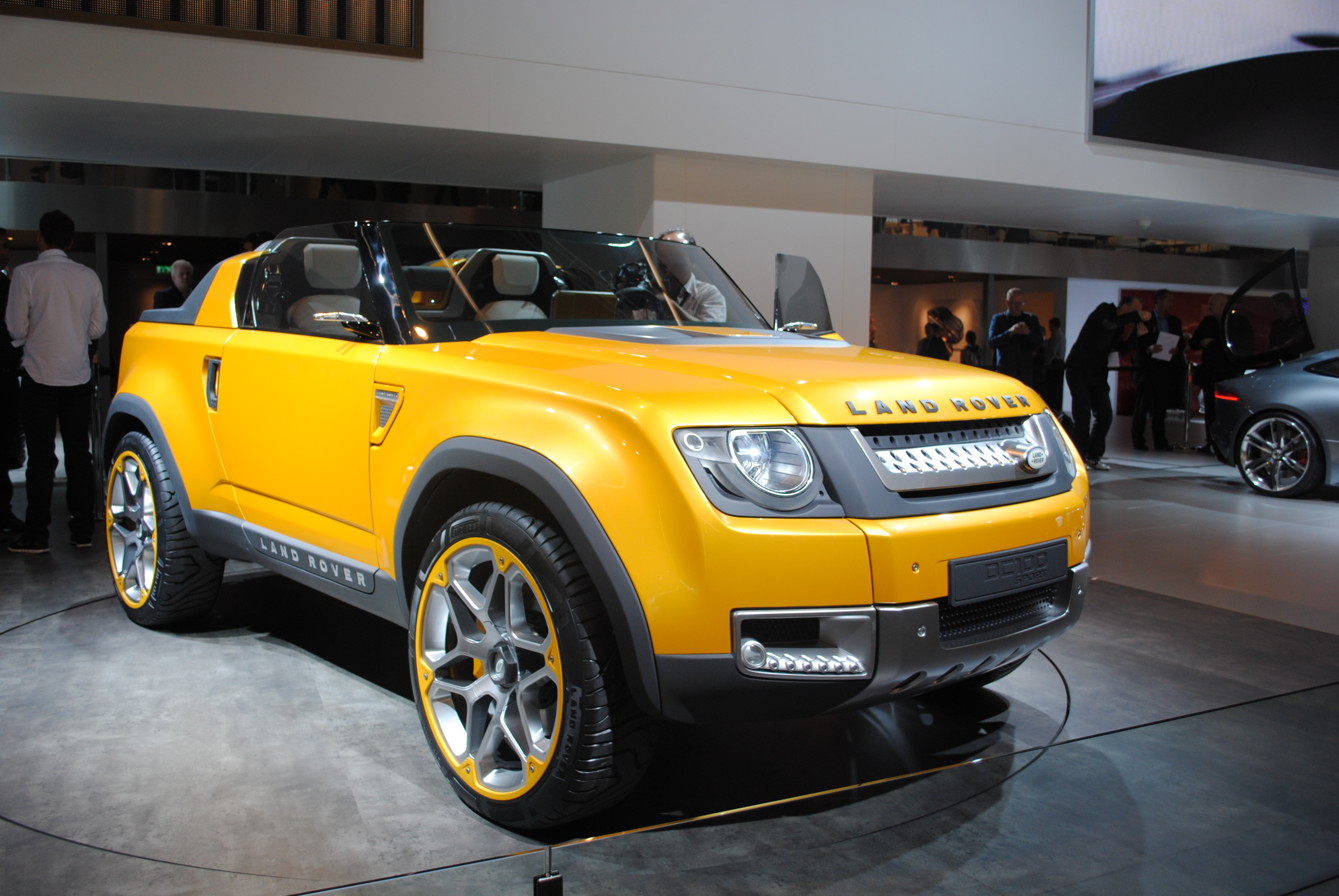
Land Rover DC100 Sport- Front view

== Reception ==
Land Rover’s brand director, John Edwards, revealed to Autocar that he was "massively encouraged" by the reaction to the DC100, and by the fact that people thought they were looking at a £45,000 vehicle. "It’s £20,000 to £25,000 in reality," he said.

The new entry-level model would be part of what Land Rover internally refers to as its leisure-oriented range, the others being utility (Defender) and luxury (Range Rovers, including the Evoque).

== See also ==
- Ineos Grenadier, an offroader inspired by the original Defender.
