= Honda Project 2&4 =

Motor vehicle by Honda

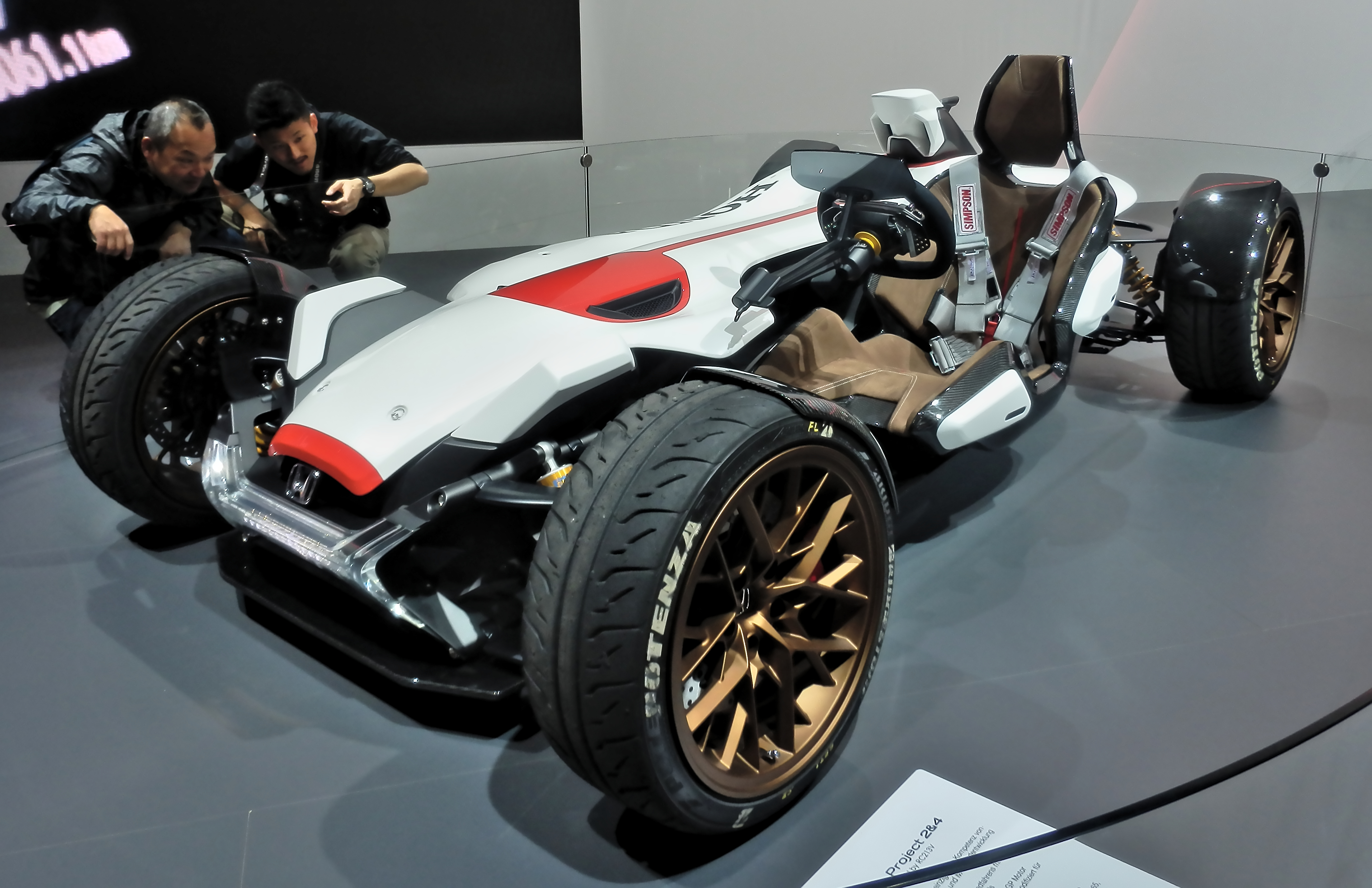

Overview
- Manufacturer: Honda
- Also called: Honda 2&4
- Production: 2015
- Designer: Martin Petersson

Body and chassis
- Class: Concept car
- Body style: open-wheel car
- Layout: Transverse mid-engine, rear-wheel-drive
- Related: Honda RC213V

Powertrain
- Engine: 999 cubic centimetres (61.0 cu in; 1.0 L) RC213V Liquid-cooled, DOHC V4
- Power output: 212 horsepower (215 PS; 158 kW) @ 10,500 rpm 87 pound-feet (118 N⋅m) @ 8,000 rpm
- Transmission: 6-Speed sequential manual cassette type

Dimensions
- Wheelbase: 110.3 inches (2,802 mm)
- Length: 119.7 inches (3,040 mm)
- Width: 72.8 inches (1,849 mm)
- Height: 39.2 inches (996 mm)
- Curb weight: 893 pounds (405.1 kg)

Chronology
- Predecessor: 1997 Honda Side by Side Concept (Direct); Honda RA272 (Spiritual)

The Honda Project 2&4 was an open-wheel concept car that was initially unveiled at International Motor Show Germany in 2015. Its livery was largely inspired by the Honda RA272 Formula One race car, and the car itself was powered by the V4 engine derived from the Honda RC213V MotoGP motorcycle. The car was debuted at the 2015 Frankfurt Motor Show. The cars design was heavily influenced by the 1997 Honda Side by Side concept.
