= Nissan Hi-Cross =

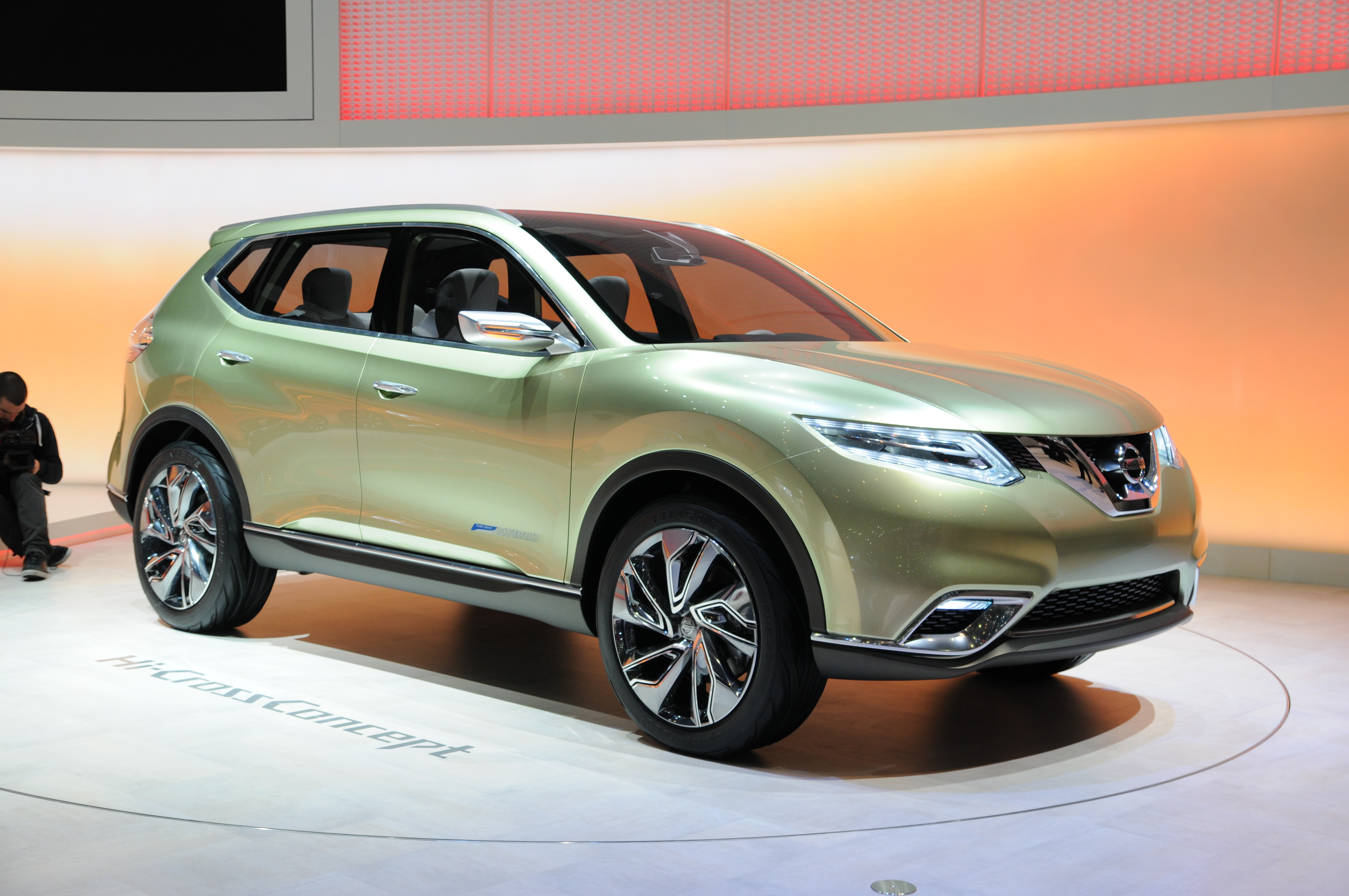

Overview
- Manufacturer: Nissan
- Model years: 2012 (Geneva International Auto Show)

Body and chassis
- Class: Compact crossover SUV
- Body style: 5-door SUV
- Layout: Front-engine, four-wheel drive.

Powertrain
- Engine: [ 2.0L [hybrid] I4]
- Transmission: CVT

Chronology
- Successor: Nissan X-Trail (3rd generation)

The Nissan Hi-Cross is a concept SUV designed by Nissan Motors Company that was unveiled at the 2012 Geneva Motor Show. It was also displayed at the 2012 Los Angeles Auto Show. The Hi-Cross had a 2.0-liter gas and electric hybrid engine.

As the Hi-cross was a compact or middle-size SUV with 5 or 7 seats, it was predicted that the Hi-cross might be a precursor to the third generation of Nissan X-Trail and its main competitors would be the Toyota RAV4, Honda CR-V and Mazda CX-5.

== Overview ==
=== Design ===
Compared to previously conservative form factors, Nissan added more streamlined elements for the Hi-cross, fusing them with existing Nissan SUV designs. In the front, it had a characteristic V-shaped Nissan grille with tapered LED headlamps, compared to previous rectangular halogen lamps. It also featured a metallic splash guard and 21-inch sports alloy wheels. The character line extended from the hood down its flanks and the D-pillar. At the back of the Hi-Cross was a hatchback, extended roof spoiler, and trapezoidal LED taillights that mirrored the headlamps.

The Hi-cross was 4,660 mm long, 1,850 mm wide and 1,670 mm high. Despite its compact footprint, it had a 109.4-inch wheelbase and three rows of seating for seven. The cockpit had a T-wing-shaped dash, which matched the two-tone door panels and steering wheel.

== Technology ==
The main technologies featured in the Hi-cross concept were the new engine and transmission.

=== Engine ===
Instead of the traditional displacement V6 engine, the Hi-cross was equipped with a hybrid 2.0-liter direct injection petrol engine and a lithium-ion battery-powered electric motor. The Hi-cross would mainly rely on the petrol engine for power, while the electric motor reduced emissions and increased the fuel economy. The power output was expected to achieve the level of a 2.5-liter engine. A "one-motor, two-clutch" system involved a first clutch between the patrol engine and the electric motor, for fully decoupling them in electric mode. The second clutch was behind the transmission to make a smooth transition between the two. This led to energy savings and increased efficiency.

=== Transmission ===
The Hi-cross featured a new generation of the XTRONIC CVT. It adopted the HEV drivetrain, which was based on the technology modified by four-wheel drive models rather than front-wheel drive wheels from before. The new system led to a 10 percent improvement in fuel emissions from the previous generation's CVT. The XTRONIC CVT would be low-friction and had smaller shaft-diameter pulleys, which would provide the widest ratio coverage for smoother shifting. It would be better coordinated with the hybrid engine and the new four-wheel system.
