= Dodge M80 =

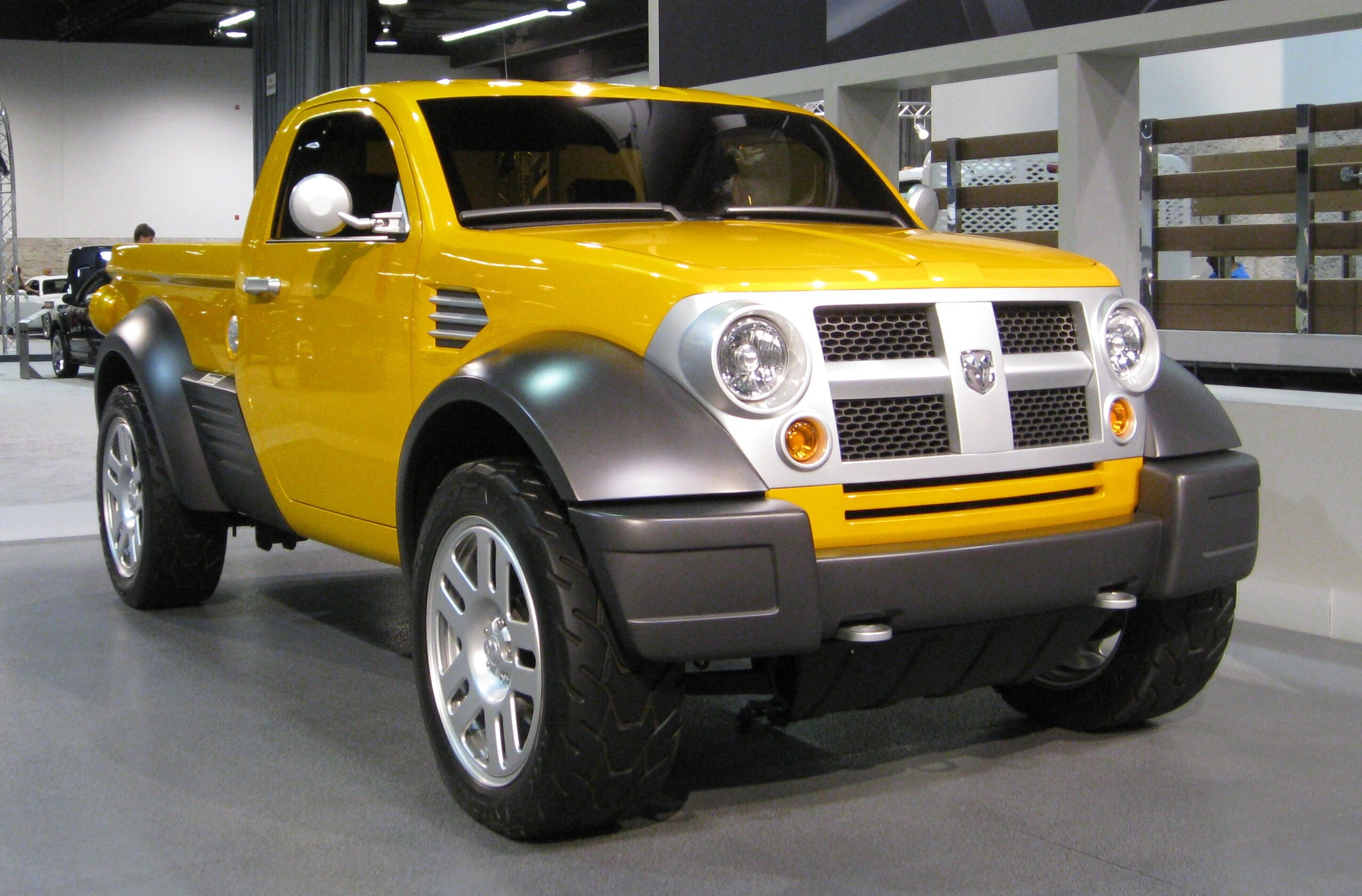

Overview
- Manufacturer: Dodge (Chrysler)
- Production: 2002
- Designer: John Opfer, Jeff Gale

Body and chassis
- Class: Concept car
- Body style: 2-door pickup
- Layout: FR layout
- Platform: Chrysler N platform

Powertrain
- Engine: 3.7 L PowerTech V6
- Transmission: 5-speed NV3500 manual

The Dodge M80 was a concept car created by Dodge, first introduced at the 2002 North American International Auto Show. It was designed as a modern interpretation of Dodge trucks of the 1930s and 1940s.

== History ==
Chrysler considered putting the M80 into production at a new factory in Canada, with plans to base it on the existing Dakota and compete in the small truck segment as a low priced offering aimed at young buyers. The project was killed in May, 2003, though, after they were unable to make the financials of the project work, and the M80 never saw production.

== Specifications ==
The M80 is based on the chassis and powertrain of the Dodge Dakota, and is powered by the Dakota's naturally aspirated 3.7 L EKG V6 engine, producing 210 hp (157 kW) and 235 lb⋅ft (319 N⋅m) of torque, paired to a five-speed manual transmission. Dodge estimated it could accelerate from 0-60 mph (97 km/h) in 8.0 seconds. The M80 is fitted with 20 in (510 mm) wheels and 265/50R20 Goodyear tires.

== Design and features ==
The M80's exterior design is loosely based on pickup trucks of the 1930s and 1940s, with the interior design being described as "rugged", "simple" and "minimalist". It features racks that can hold objects as big as an all-terrain vehicle, a storage compartment underneath the bed, and a flip-open rear window. The interior features seats that can be removed for outdoor use and a removable center console that doubles as a portable cooler.
