= Shelby Dakota =

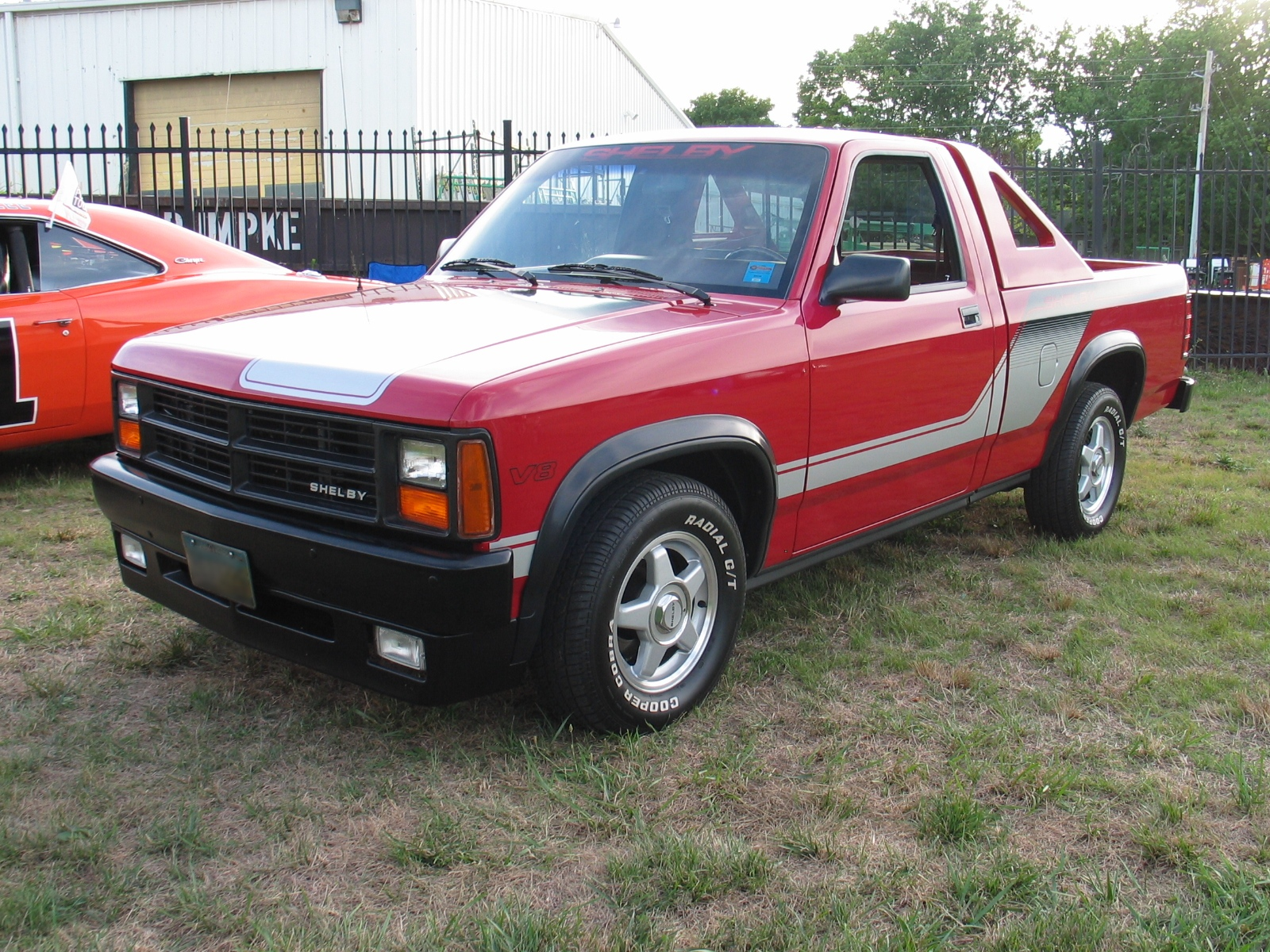

Overview
- Manufacturer: Chrysler; Shelby American
- Also called: Dodge Shelby Dakota; Dodge Dakota Shelby
- Production: 1989

Body and chassis
- Class: Mid-size pickup truck
- Body style: 2-door truck
- Layout: FR layout
- Platform: N-body
- Related: Dodge Dakota (first generation)

Powertrain
- Engine: 5.2 L (318 ci) LA V8
- Transmission: 4-speed A500 automatic

The Shelby Dakota is a limited-production performance version of the Dodge Dakota Sport pickup truck. Offered by Shelby for 1989 only, it was his first rear-wheel drive vehicle in many years, and his first production pickup truck.

The Shelby Dakota started with a short-wheelbase, short-bed, standard-cab, Sport package pickup. The 3.9 L V6 producing 125 hp (93 kW) was replaced by a 5.2 L V8 with throttle-body injection. The tight space in the Dakota's engine compartment necessitated removing the engine-driven fan in front and using a pair of electric ones instead. Removing the belt-driven fan increased the stock 5.2 L V8's output by 5 hp (3.7 kW). With that, the Shelby Dakota produced 175 hp (130 kW) at 4000 rpm and 270 ft⋅lbf (370 N⋅m) of torque at 2000 rpm, with a redline at 4,750 rpm. The only transmission option was a 4-speed automatic, and the truck featured a 3.90:1 limited slip differential. When tested by Motor Trend, the Shelby Dakota clocked a 0-60 mph (97 km/h) time of 8.5 seconds and a quarter mile time of 15.6 seconds.

The Shelby Dakotas featured special graphics, wheels, blacked out trim, wheelarch extensions, a sports bar behind the cab and a front air dam with integrated fog lamps. On the interior, they also featured a Shelby steering wheel, seat inserts, and floormats, and individually numbered dash plaques.

Total production was 1,500; 860 in red and 540 in white. List price was $15,813 plus freight.

Dodge later introduced a high-performance version of the second-generation Dakota in 1998 with the Dakota R/T. Though lacking Shelby involvement, it similarly featured performance and appearance upgrades over the standard Dakota Sport, including special wheels and tires, better suspension components, and a larger, more powerful V8 engine.
