= Mitsubishi Raider =

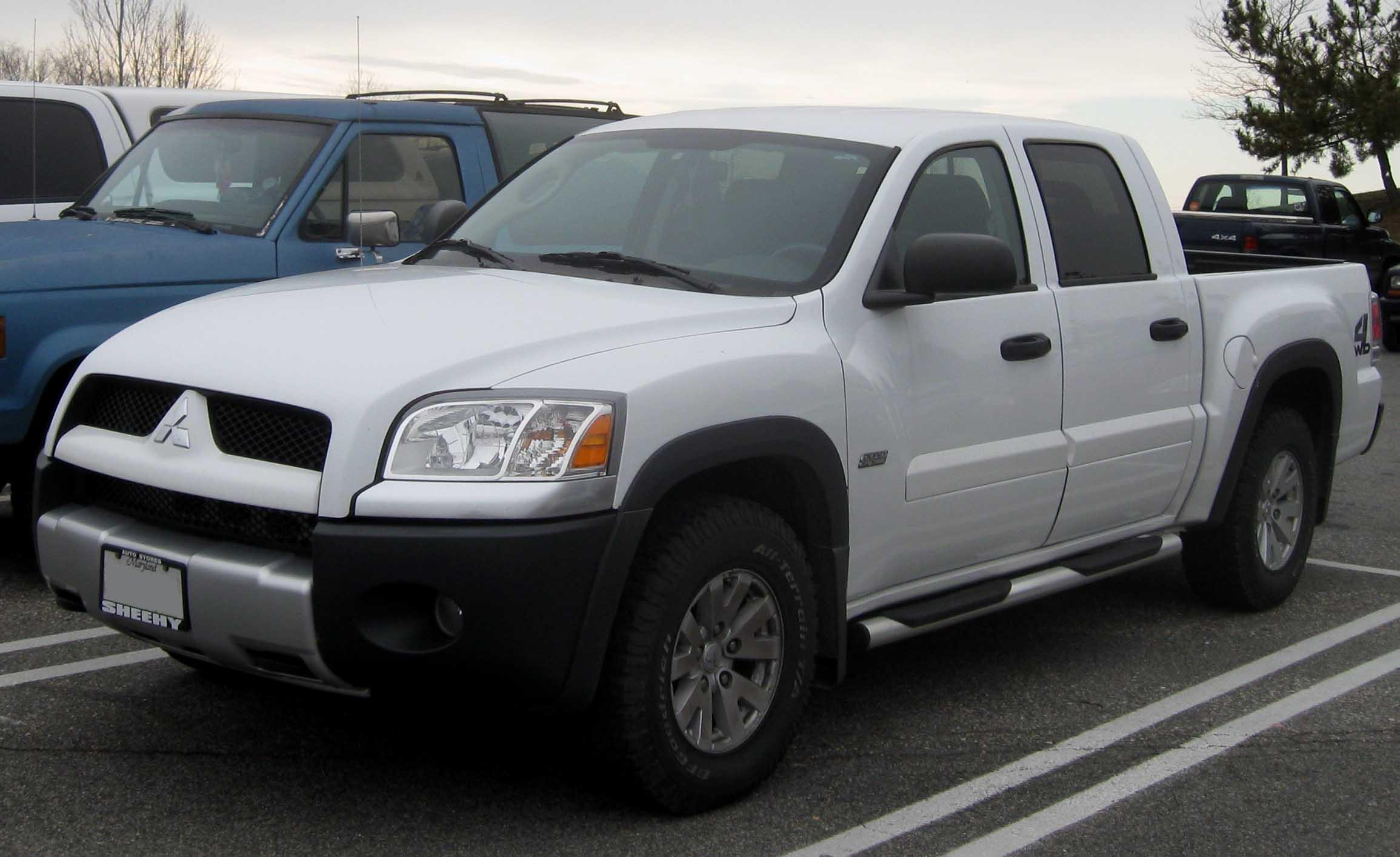
- Mitsubishi Raider DuroCross (Double Cab)

Overview
- Manufacturer: DaimlerChrysler (2006–2007); Chrysler LLC (2007–2009); Chrysler Group LLC (2009)
- Production: Fall 2005–June 11, 2009
- Model years: 2006–2009
- Assembly: United States: Warren, Michigan, Normal, Illinois

Body and chassis
- Class: Mid-size pickup truck
- Body style: 4-door pickup truck; extended cab or double cab
- Layout: Front-engine, rear-wheel-drive; Front-engine, four-wheel-drive
- Platform: Chrysler ND platform
- Related: Dodge Dakota

Powertrain
- Engine: 3.7 L Chrysler PowerTech V6; 4.7 L Chrysler PowerTech V8
- Transmission: 4-speed automatic 5-speed automatic 6-speed manual

Dimensions
- Wheelbase: 131.3 in (3,335 mm)
- Length: 218.5 in (5,550 mm)
- Width: 71.7 in (1,821 mm)
- Height: 68.6 in (1,742 mm)

Chronology
- Predecessor: Mitsubishi Mighty Max

The Mitsubishi Raider is a mid-size pickup truck from Mitsubishi Motors that debuted in the fall of 2005 as a 2006 model for the United States market and is based largely on the Dodge Dakota. The name is recycled from the Dodge Raider SUV sold from 1987 to 1990, which was a rebadged Mitsubishi Montero.

== History ==
The Raider filled the gap in the Mitsubishi lineup since the discontinuation of the Mighty Max in 1996. Though Mitsubishi was still building their own Triton at the time, it would have been subject to the chicken tax, while an American-built pickup was not. Chrysler manufactured the Raider alongside the Dakota at their Warren Truck Assembly plant in Warren, Michigan, but they were sent to Normal, Illinois, for installation of some Mitsubishi-specific parts and for distribution. Engine choices had included a 4.7 L PowerTech V8 making 230 hp (172 kW) and 290 lb⋅ft (393 N⋅m) and a 3.7 L PowerTech V6 which produced 210 hp (157 kW) and 210 lb⋅ft (285 N⋅m), though by the 2008 model year, only the 3.7 L V6 remained available.

Early sales were disappointing, at only one tenth of the Dakota's. As Mitsubishi dealers reportedly had a six-month supply of Raiders on their lots the company was obligated to request that DaimlerChrysler cut production. 9,861 Raiders were built in 2005, and just 297 more were built from the first of the year through March 11, 2006. New for 2006 was the "slammed" DuroCross version, which has lower suspension and an aggressive body kit. The DuroCross had a low payload, of only 1,180 lb (540 kg) and lost most of its off-roading abilities. Approximately 8,200 Raiders were sold in 2007.

A concept truck was rebadged as the Street Raider and designed by Mitsubishi's California design studio. It first appeared at the 2005 SEMA automotive show and since then has been shown at various automotive shows around the United States. It includes 22 inch custom wheels, custom dual exhaust, and a lowered stance among other features not found on a stock Raider. The Street Raider carried a mooted price tag of $60,000, although there were no plans to sell it.

== Gallery ==
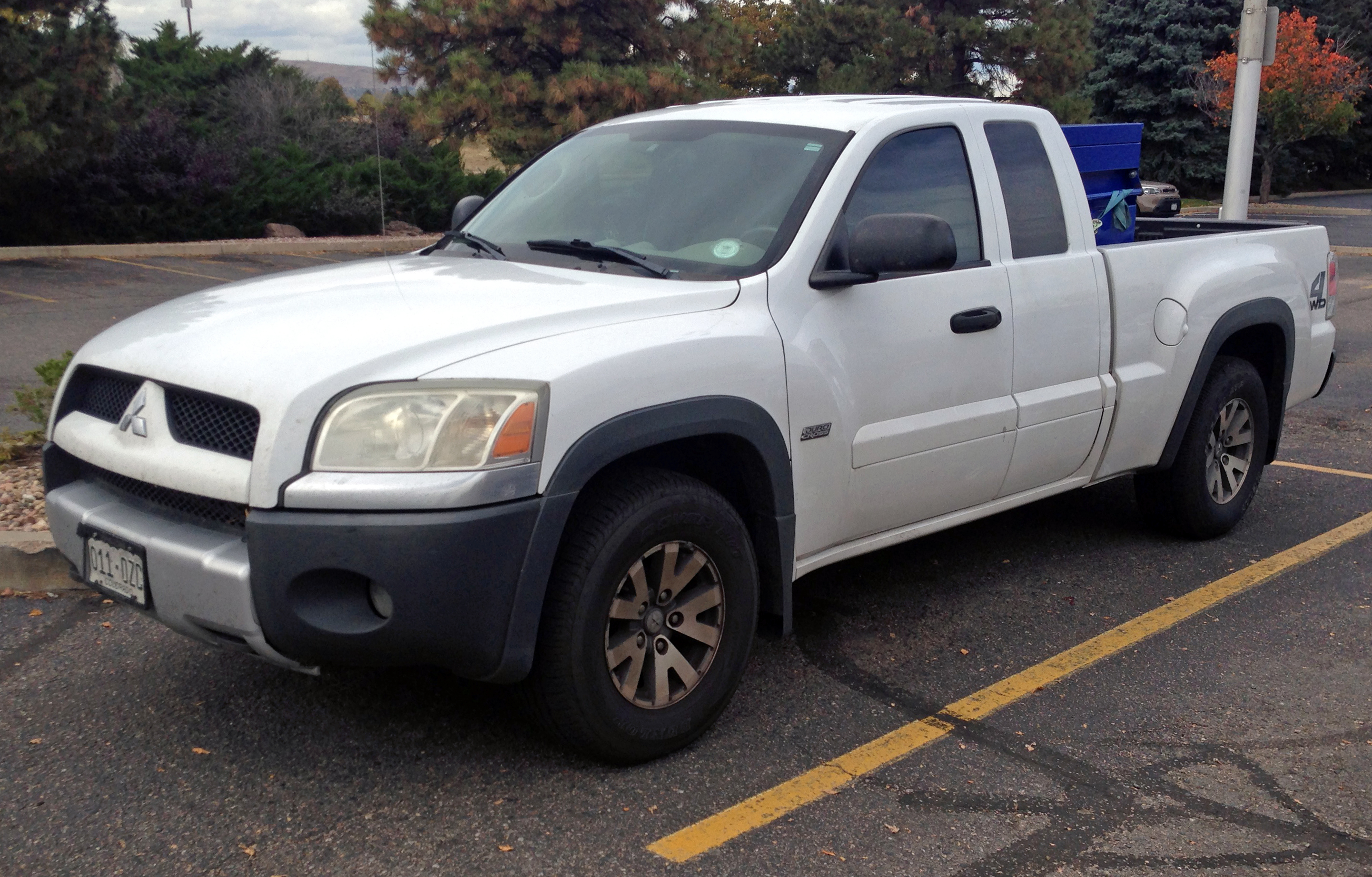
2006 Mitsubishi Raider DuroCross 4WD Extended Cab

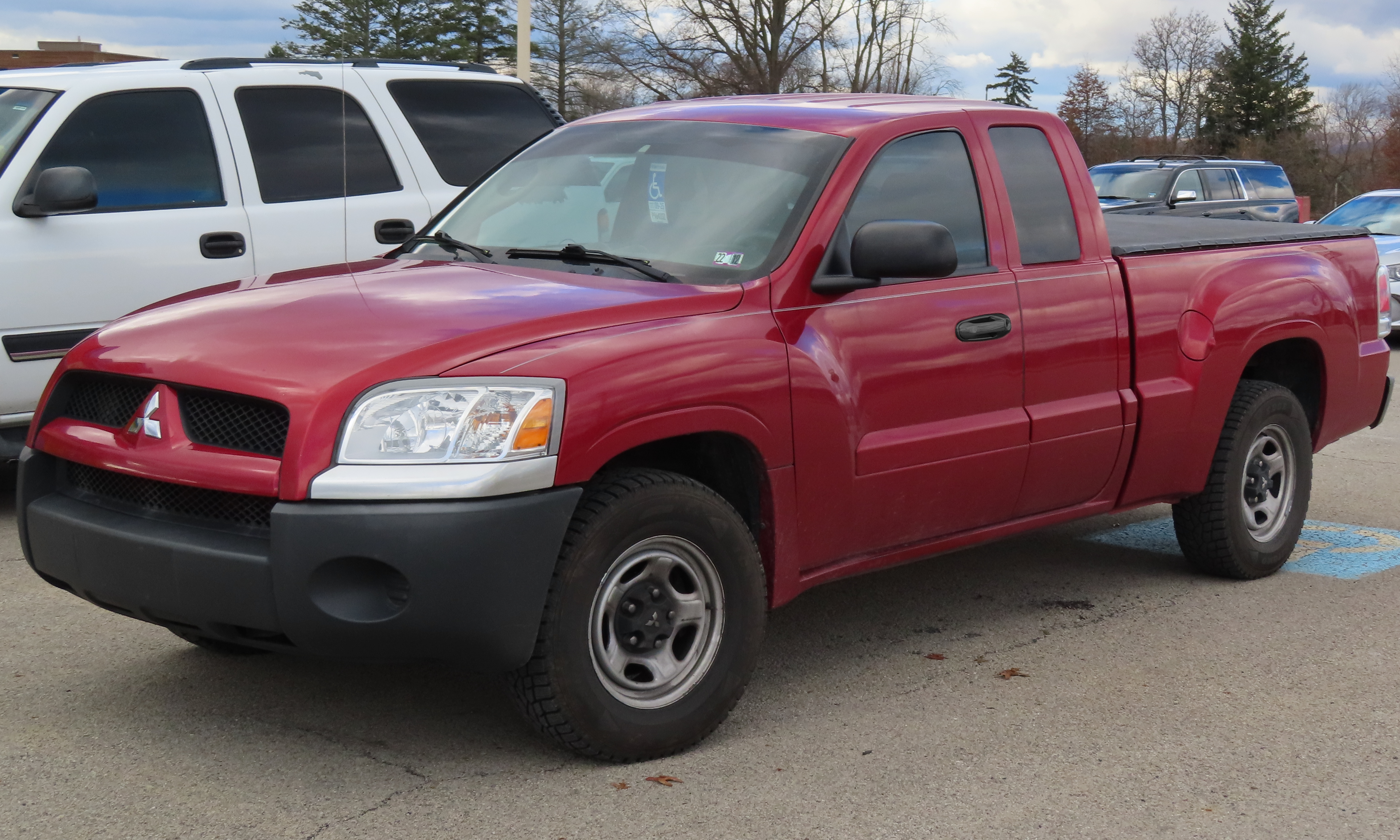
2006 Mitsubishi Raider Extended Cab LS, front

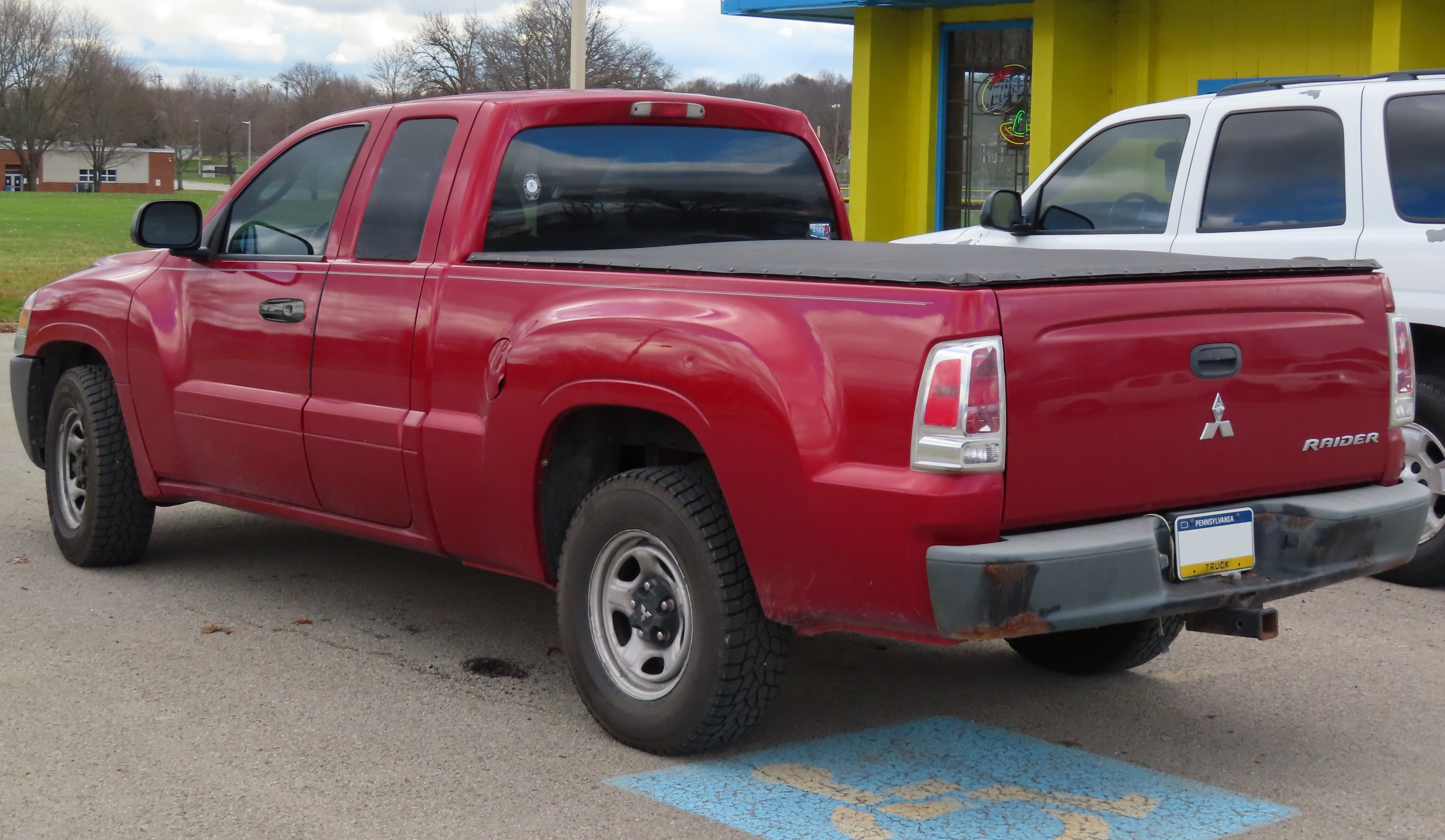
2006 Mitsubishi Raider Extended Cab LS, rear

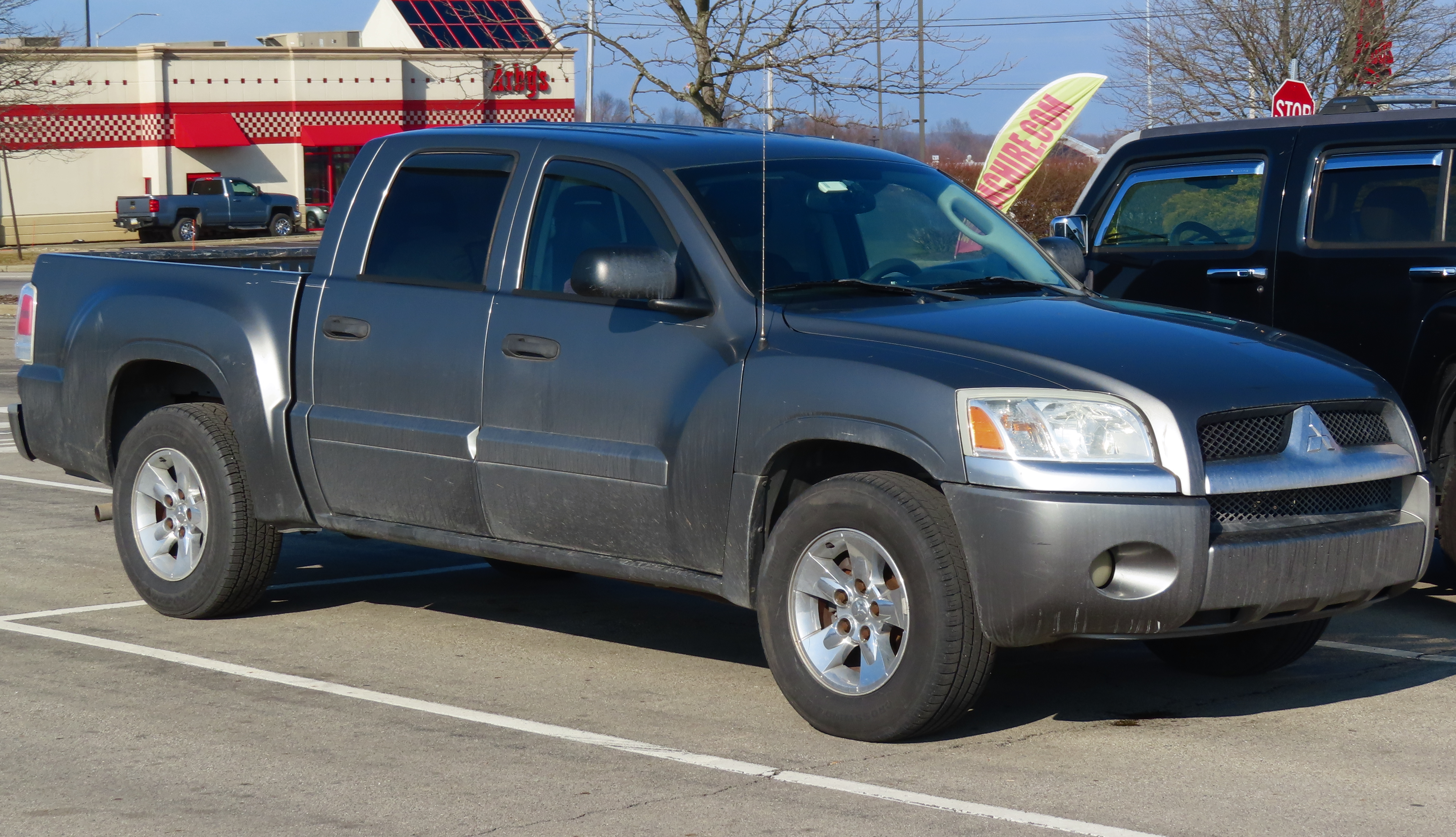
2006 Mitsubishi Raider Double Cab XLS V8

== Annual sales ==
Year	Sales
2005	2,715
2006	7,156
2007	7,479
2008	3,349
2009	1,188
2010	3

(source: Facts & Figures 2008, Facts & Figures 2011, Mitsubishi Motors website)
