= Chrysler PowerTech engine =

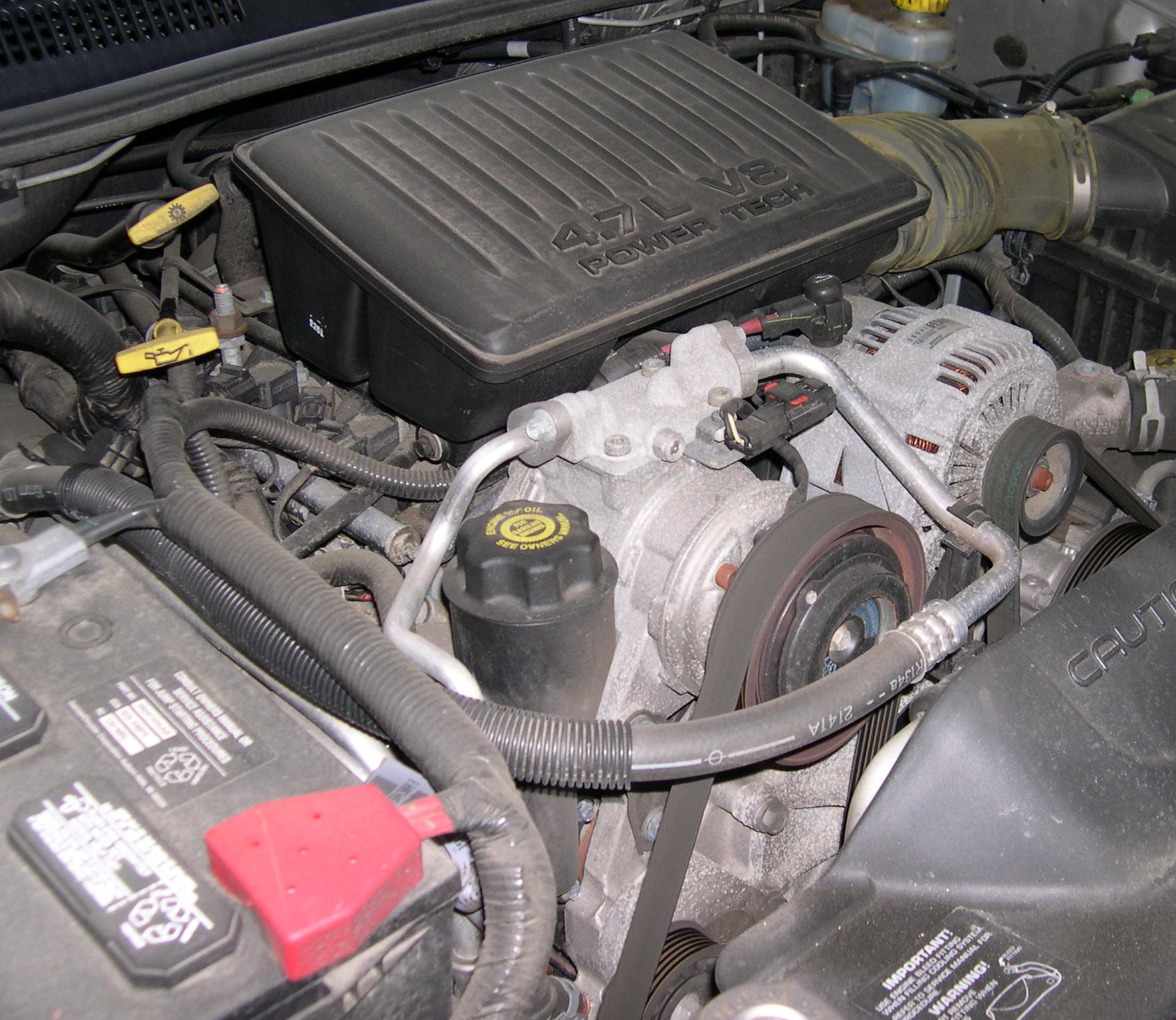

Overview
- Manufacturer: DaimlerChrysler AG (1999–2007); Chrysler LLC (2007–2009); Chrysler Group LLC (2009–2013)
- Also called: Next Generation Magnum
- Production: 1999–April 9, 2013

Layout
- Configuration: Naturally aspirated 90° V6/V8
- Displacement: 3.7–4.7 L; 225.8–286.7 cu in (3,701–4,698 cc)
- Cylinder bore: 3.66 in (93 mm)
- Piston stroke: 3.405 in (86.5 mm); 3.57 in (90.7 mm)
- Cylinder block material: Cast iron
- Cylinder head material: Aluminum
- Valvetrain: Single overhead camshaft with 2 valves per cyl.
- Valvetrain drive system: Timing Chain
- Compression ratio: 9.6:1-9.8:1

Combustion
- Fuel system: Sequential MPFI
- Fuel type: Gasoline; E85
- Oil system: Wet sump
- Cooling system: Water-cooled

Output
- Power output: 210–310 hp (213–314 PS; 157–231 kW)
- Torque output: 235–334 lb⋅ft (32–46 kg⋅m; 319–453 N⋅m)

Chronology
- Predecessor: AMC/Jeep 4.0 (I6); Chrysler LA engine (V8)
- Successor: Chrysler Pentastar engine (V6); Chrysler Hemi Engine (V8)

The initial design development for the PowerTech V6 and V8 engine family was done by American Motors Corporation (AMC) and debuted in 1998 with credit to Chrysler. This was the first new V8 engine for Chrysler since the 1960s. The companion V6 was basically the V8 with two fewer cylinders, another concept that originated at AMC before the company joined Chrysler. These new engines had nothing in common with the Chrysler LA engine V8s, nor the Jeep 4.0 L "PowerTech" I6 engine.

A 4.7 L V8 came first, available in the Jeep Grand Cherokee, and a 3.7 L V6 version debuted in 2002 for the Jeep Liberty. The PowerTech V6 and V8 were direct replacements for Chrysler's Magnum series in the early 2000s, and were also used in the Dodge Ram and started in the 2000 Dodge Durango. They were not used in any cars, but were reserved for truck and SUV use. They are also known as Next Generation Magnum in Dodge applications.

The PowerTech V6 and V8 engines were produced at the Mack Avenue Engine Complex in Detroit, Michigan. E85 compatible versions of some PowerTech engines were developed and used in numerous Chrysler vehicles. On April 9, 2013, the last 4.7 L engine was built; ending 15 years of production with over 3 million units built.

== 4.7 ==
The 4.7-liter version was the first of this family, appearing in the 1999 Jeep Grand Cherokee. The displacement is 4.7 L; 286.7 cu in (4,698 cc) with a bore and a stroke of 3.66 in × 3.405 in (93.0 mm × 86.5 mm). It has a cast iron block and aluminum heads with two valves per cylinder. It uses chain-driven Single overhead camshafts, one in each head. It originally produced 235 hp (175 kW) and 295 lb⋅ft (400 N⋅m) of torque. The 4.7 L V8 is available with four speed and five speed automatic transmissions and a 5 speed manual transmission.

The PowerTech was on the Ward's 10 Best Engines list for 1999.

- 1999–2009 Jeep Grand Cherokee
- 2000–2007 Dodge Dakota
- 2000–2009 Dodge Durango
- 2002–2010 Dodge Ram 1500
- 2006–2009 Jeep Commander
- 2007–2009 Chrysler Aspen
- 2006–2007 Mitsubishi Raider

=== 4.7 HO ===
A "High-Output" version of the 4.7 L PowerTech engine, producing 265 hp (198 kW) and 330 lb⋅ft (447 N⋅m) of torque, was introduced in 2002, first appearing in the Jeep Grand Cherokee Limited as an option and in the Jeep Grand Cherokee Overland as standard equipment.

This engine was discontinued after the 2008 model year, though the non high output 4.7L V8 engine continued to be available in all vehicles.

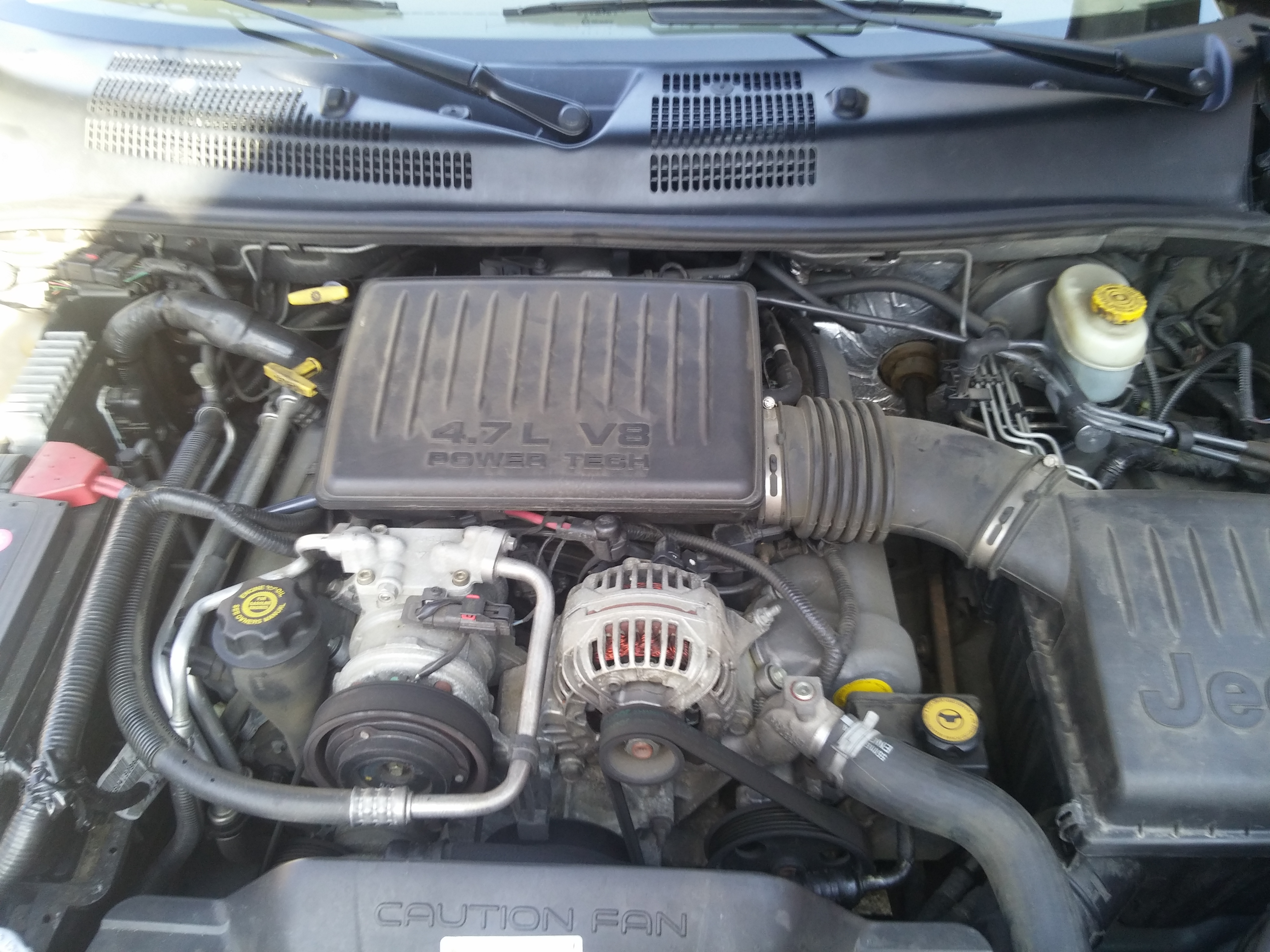
4.7 PowerTech engine Jeep WJ

Applications:

- 2002–2004 Jeep Grand Cherokee
- 2007–2008 Jeep Grand Cherokee
- 2005--2007 Dodge Dakota
- 2007–2008 Dodge Ram 1500

==== 2008 Revisions ====
The 2008 Dodge Dakota and Ram pickup trucks, Dodge Durango and Chrysler Aspen SUV's, Jeep Grand Cherokee, and Jeep Commander came with a Corsair version of the FFV 4.7 L engine, with dual spark plugs per cylinder, a new slant / squish combustion system design, and 9.8:1 compression, raising power to 290–310 hp (216–231 kW) and 320–334 lb⋅ft (434–453 N⋅m) of torque. The 2008 4.7 also features other upgrades including a more aggressive camshaft profile, a 74 mm (2.91 in) throttle body, and an improved intake manifold with shorter runners.

== 3.7 EKG ==
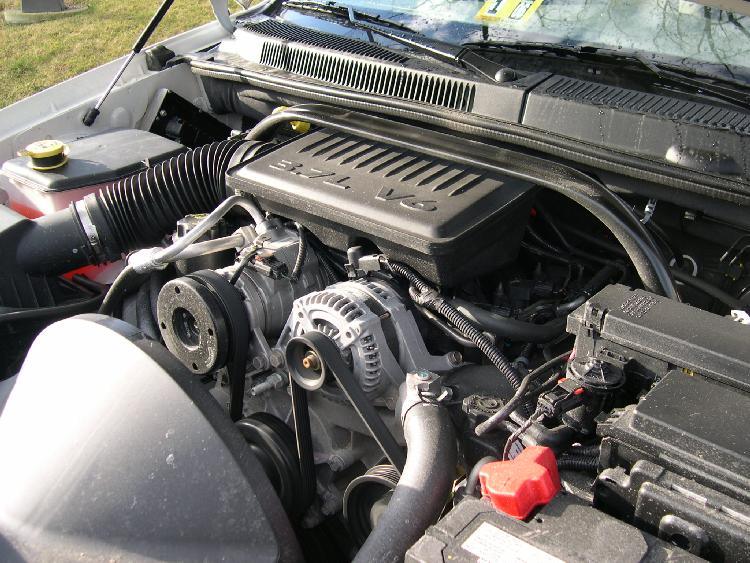
Chrysler PowerTech 3.7 L V6 in a 2005 Jeep Grand Cherokee

The EKG is a 3.7 L V6 version built in Detroit, Michigan. It displaces 3.7 L; 225.8 cu in (3,701 cc). The bore and stroke measure 3.66 in × 3.57 in (93.0 mm × 90.7 mm). It is a 90° V engine like the V8, with SOHC 2-valve heads. It utilizes a counter-rotating balance shaft mounted between the cylinder banks to deal with vibration problems of the 90-degree V6 design, as well as use a 30-degree split pin crankshaft to fire the cylinders every 120 degrees. Output is 210 hp (157 kW) at 5200 rpm with 235 lb⋅ft (319 N⋅m) of torque at 4000 rpm. It has a cast iron engine block and aluminum SOHC cylinder heads. It uses Sequential fuel injection, has roller followers, and features fracture-split forged powder metal connecting rods and an assembled reinforced plastic intake manifold.

The Chrysler 3.7 PowerTech engine used in the 2007–2012 Jeep Liberty KK used a wasted spark ignition system that uses one ignition coil to fire two cylinders.

3.7 Engine Specifications
Description	Specification
Firing Order	1-6-5-4-3-2
Lead Cylinder	#1 Left Bank
Compression Ratio	9.6:1
Oil Pressure at Idle	4 psi (25 kPa)
Oil Pressure @ 3000 RPM	25-110 psi (170-758 kPa)
Max Variation Between Cylinders	25%
Compression	170-225 PSI (1172-1551 kPa)
Cylinder Bore Diameter	3.6619 in. (93.013 mm)
Cylinder Out of Round (max)	0.003 in. (0.051 mm)
Cylinder Taper (max)	0.002 in. (0.051 mm)
Pistons	
Piston Diameter	3.6605 in. (92.975 mm)
Piston Weight	12.87 oz. (365.0 grams)
Ring Groove Diameter	No. 1: 3.282-3.273 in. (85.37-83.13 mm) No. 2: 3.261-3.310 in. (82.833-83.033 mm) No. 3: 3.302-3.310 in. (83.88-84.08 mm)
Piston Pin Diameter	0.9455-0.9456 in. (24.017-24.020 mm)
Piston Pin Clearance	0.0002-0.0005 in. (0.006-0.015 mm)
Piston Ring Gap	
Top Compression Ring	0.0076-0.0142 in. (0.20-0.36 mm)
Second Compression Ring	0.0146-0.0249 in. (0.37-0.63 mm)
Oil Control Ring (Steel Rails)	0.0099-0.30 in. (0.25-0.76 mm)
Piston Ring Side Clearance	
Top Compression Ring	0.0020-0.0037 in. (0.051-0.094 mm)
Second Compression Ring	0.0016-0.0031 in. (0.040-0.080 mm)
Oil Control Ring	0.0007-0.0091 in. (0.019-0.229 mm)
Piston Ring Width	
Top Compression Ring	0.057-0.058 in. (1.472-1.490 mm)
Second Compression Ring	0.057-0.058 in. (1.472-1.490 mm)
Oil Control Ring	0.017-0.018 in. (0.445-0.470 mm)
Connecting Rods	
Bearing Clearance	0.0002-0.0017 in. (0.006-0.044 mm)
Side Clearance	0.004-0.0138 in. (0.10-0.35 mm)
Piston Pin Clearance	0.0006-0.0011 in. (0.015-0.028 mm)
Bearing Bore Out of Round (max)	0.0002 in. (0.004mm)
Total Weight (No Bearing)	21.588 Ounces (612 Grams)
Crankshaft	
Main Bearing Journal Diameter	2.4996-2.5005 in. (63.488-63.512 mm)
Main Bearing Clearance	0.00008-0.0018 in. (0.002-0.048 mm)
Main Bearing Out of Round (max)	0.0002 in. (0.282 mm)
Main Bearing Taper (max)	0.0004 in. (0.006 mm)
Connecting Rod Journal Diameter	2.2798-2.2792 in. (57.908-57.892 mm)
Connecting Rod Bearing Clearance	0.0002-0.0011 in. (0.006-0.044 mm)
Connecting Rod Bearing Out of Round (max)	0.0002 in. (0.005 mm)
Connecting Rod Bearing Taper (max)	0.0002 in. (0.006 mm)
End Play	0.0021-0.0112 in. (0.052-0.282 mm)
Camshaft	
Bore Diameter	1.0245-1.0252 in. (26.02-28.04 mm)
Bearing Journal Diameter	1.0227-1.0235 in. (25.975-25.995 mm)
Bearing Clearance	0.001-0.0026 in. (0.025-0.065 mm)
End Play	0.003-0.0079 in. (0.075-0.200 mm)
Valve Timing	
Valve Overlap	25.7°
Intake	
Opens (Before Top Dead Center)	5.6°
Closes (After Top Dead Center)	240.1°
Duration	245.7°
Exhaust	
Opens (Before Top Dead Center)	241.5°
Closes (After Top Dead Center)	20.1°
Duration	261.6°
Valves	
Face Angle	45°-45.5°
Head Diameter	
Intake	1.9103-1.9205 in. (48.52-48.78 mm)
Exhaust	1.4516-1.4618 in. (36.87-37.13 mm)
Length (Overall)	
Intake	4.4666-4.4965 in. (113.45-114.21 mm)
Exhaust	4.5244-4.5543 in. (114.92-115.68 mm)
Stem Diameter	
Intake	0.2729-0.2739 in. (6.931-6.957 mm)
Exhaust	0.2717-0.2728 in. (6.902-6.928 mm)
Stem-to-Guide Clearance	
Intake	0.0008-0.0028 in. (0.018-0.069 mm)
Exhaust	0.0019-0.0039 in. (0.047-0.098 mm)
Valve Lift (Zero Lash)	
Intake	0.472 in. (12.00 mm)
Exhaust	0.472 in. (12.00 mm)
Valve Springs	
Free Length	
Intake	1.896 in. (48.18 mm)
Exhaust w/ Damper	1.973 in. (49.2 mm)
Spring Force (Closed Valve)	
Intake	74.53-82.72 lbs. @ 1.5795 in (332.0-358.0 N @ 40.12mm)
Exhaust w/o Damper	80.031-88.57 lbs. @ 1.54 in. (356-394 N @ 39.12 mm)
Spring Force (Open Valve)	
Intake	213.2-233.8 lbs. @ 1.107 in. (948.0-1038.0 N @ 28.12 mm)
Exhaust w/o Damper	196.5-214.9 lbs. @ 1.057 in. (874-856 @ 27.12 mm)
Number of Coils	
Intake	7.30
Exhaust	7.15
Wire Diameter	
Intake	0.1878 x 0.1496 in. (4.77 x 3.80 mm)
Exhaust	0.1843 x 0.1464 in (4.66 x 3.72 mm)
Installed Height (Spring Seat to Bottom of Retainer)	
Intake	1.579 in. (40.12 mm)
Exhaust w/ Damper	1.579 in. (40.12 mm)
Cylinder Head	
Gasket Thickness	0.0276 in. (0.7mm)
Valve Seat Angle	44.5°-45.0°
Valve Seat Runout (max)	0.002 in. (0.051 mm)
Valve Seat Width	Intake / Exhaust; 0.0698-0.0928 in. (1.75-2.36 mm) / 0.0673-0.091 in. (1.71-2.32 mm)
Guide Bore Diameter	0.2747-0.2756 in (6.975-7.00 mm)
Cylinder Head Warpage (Flatness)	0.002 in. (0.0508 mm)

Applications

- 2002–2010 Dodge Ram 1500
- 2002 Dodge M80
- 2004–2011 Dodge Dakota
- 2004–2009 Dodge Durango
- 2007–2011 Dodge Nitro
- 2002–2012 Jeep Liberty
- 2005–2010 Jeep Grand Cherokee
- 2006–2010 Jeep Commander
- 2006–2010 Mitsubishi Raider
- 2011–2012 Ram 1500
