= Dodge Dakota =

Mid-size truck

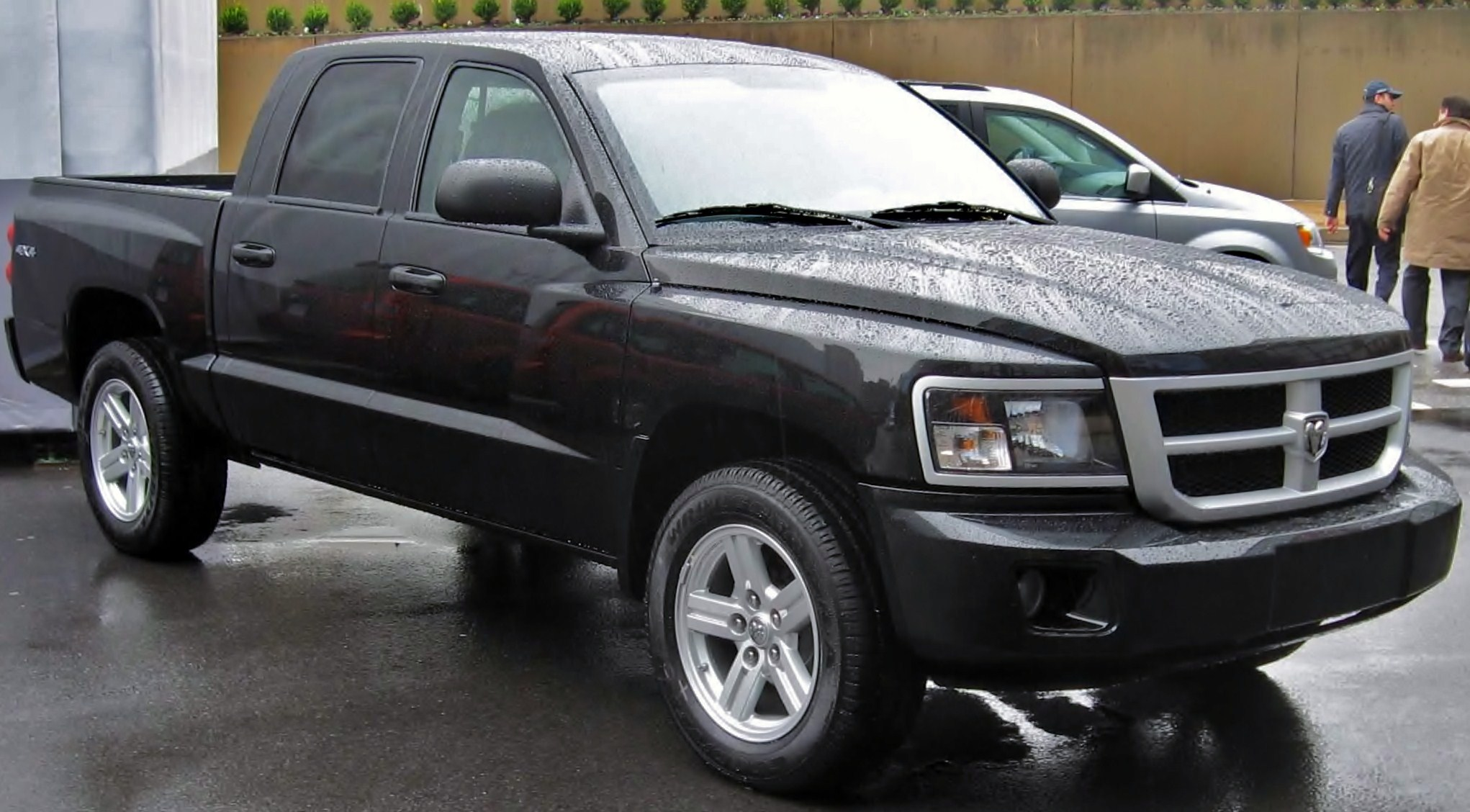

Overview
- Manufacturer: Chrysler Corporation (1986–1998); DaimlerChrysler (1998–2007); Chrysler LLC (2007–2009); Chrysler Group LLC (2009–2011); Stellantis (2025–present, South America)
- Production: 1986–2011; 2025–present (South America)
- Model years: 1987–2011; 2026–present (South America)
- Assembly: United States: Warren, Michigan (Warren Truck Assembly); Brazil: Campo Largo, Paraná (1998–2001)

Body and chassis
- Class: Mid-size pickup truck
- Layout: Front-engine, rear-wheel-drive; Front-engine, four-wheel-drive

Chronology
- Predecessor: Dodge Ram 50

The Dodge Dakota, marketed as the Ram Dakota for the final two years of production, is a mid-size pickup truck manufactured by Chrysler and marketed by its Dodge Truck division (model years 1987–2009) and later its Ram Truck division (2010–2011) — across three generations.

It used body-on-frame construction and a leaf spring/live axle rear end and was the first mid-size pickup with an optional V8 engine. For its entire production, the Dakota was manufactured at Chrysler's Warren Truck Assembly in Michigan.

The Dakota was nominated for the North American Truck of the Year award for 2000. The new 2027 Ram Dakota for South American market was unveiled in August 2025.

== First generation (1987–1996) ==
First generation
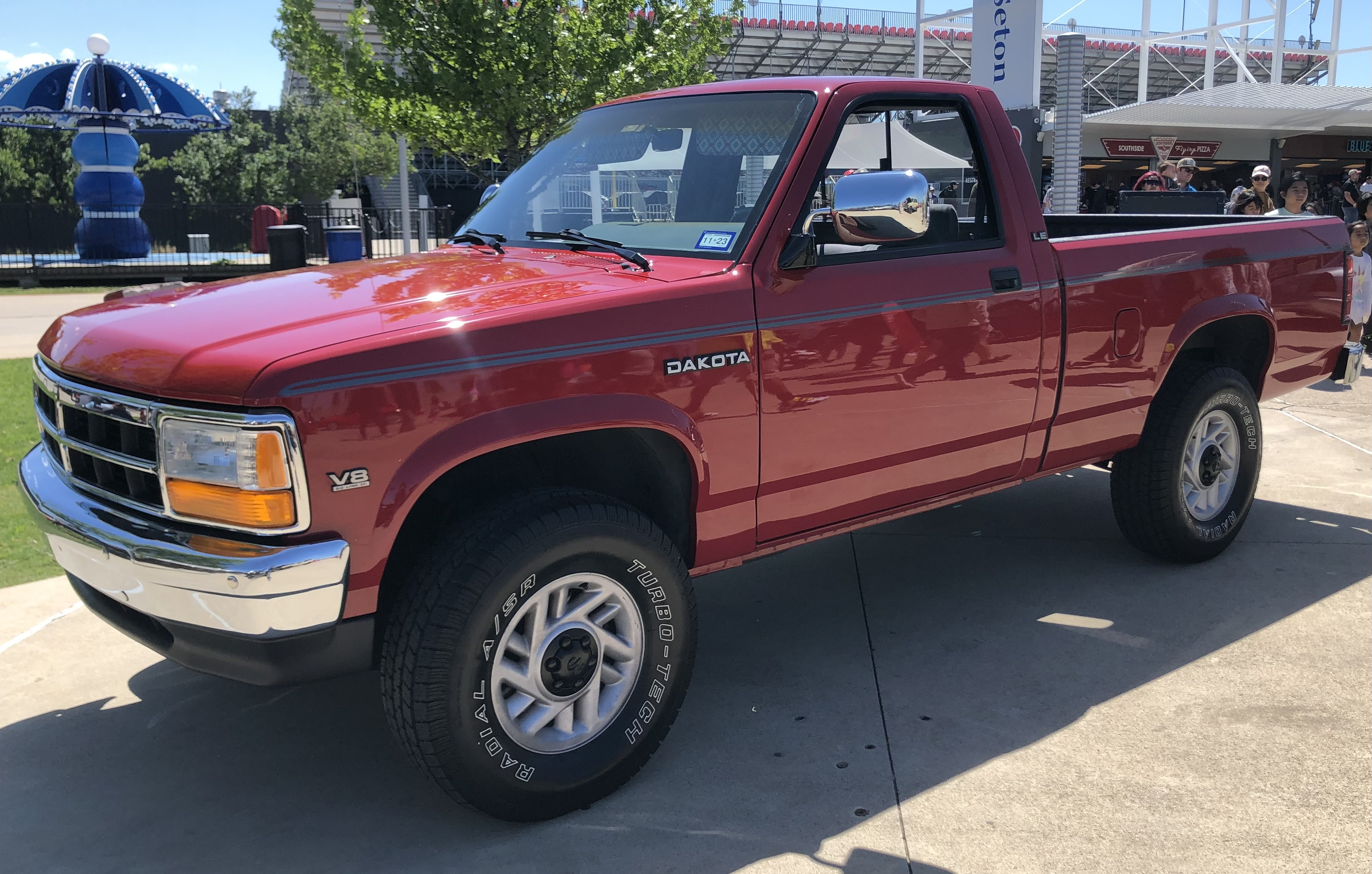
- 1992–1996 Dodge Dakota V8

Overview
- Production: 1986–1996
- Model years: 1987–1996

Body and chassis
- Body style: 2-door pickup truck 2-door convertible 2-door extended cab
- Platform: Chrysler AN platform
- Related: Shelby Dakota

Powertrain
- Engine: 2.2 L (135 cu in) K I4; 2.5 L (152 cu in) K I4; 2.5 L (150 cu in) AMC I4; 3.9 L (239 cu in) LA/Magnum V6; 5.2 L (318 cu in) LA/Magnum V8
- Transmission: 3-speed A998 automatic 4-speed A500 automatic 5-speed manual

Dimensions
- Wheelbase: 111.9 in (2,842 mm); 123.9 in (3,147 mm); 130.9 in (3,325 mm) (Club Cab)
- Length: 1987–1990: 185.9 in (4,722 mm)/204.4 in (5,192 mm); 1989–1990 Club Cab: 211.1 in (5,362 mm); 1991–93: 184.2 in (4,679 mm)/202.7 in (5,149 mm); 1991–93 Club Cab: 203.2 in (5,161 mm); 1994–96: 195.3 in (4,961 mm)/213.8 in (5,431 mm); 1994–96 Club Cab: 214.3 in (5,443 mm)
- Width: 1987–88: 68.4 in (1,737 mm)/68.1 in (1,730 mm); 1989–1996: 69.4 in (1,763 mm)
- Height: 1987–1990: 64.2 in (1,631 mm)/67.1 in (1,704 mm); 1989–1993 Club Cab: 64.7 in (1,643 mm); 1991–93 Club Cab 4WD: 67.7 in (1,720 mm); 1994–96 4WD: 67.3 in (1,709 mm); 1994–96 Club Cab 4WD: 68.5 in (1,740 mm); 1994–96 2WD: 65.0 in (1,651 mm); 1994–96 2WD Club Cab: 65.6 in (1,666 mm)

The Dodge Dakota was developed by Chrysler as a mid-sized pickup. To keep investment low, many components were shared with existing Chrysler products and the manufacturing plant was shared with the full-size Dodge D/W series. The N-body platform was the result of operational efforts by Harold K. Sperlich, who was in charge of Chrysler's product planning in the early 1980s.

The first generation of the Dakota was produced from 1986 through 1996 (for the 1987–1996 model years). The Dakota was the first pickup truck with rack-and-pinion steering (2WD only, and early years were available without power steering). Inline-four, V6, and eventually V8 engines were offered along with either a five-speed manual or three-speed automatic transmission. Four-wheel drive was available only with the V6. Both 6.5- and 8-foot beds were offered.

The sport package was added as a mid-year release. Exterior colors came in black, bright white, and graphic red. Available only with the 3.9-liter V6 engine in both 2WD and 4WD, the Sport option included black grille and bumpers with side stripes and 15-inch aluminum wheels, as well as a front air dam with Bosch fog lamps and a light-bar with Bosch off-road lamps (4WD only). It also received the sliding rear window which had hitherto been reserved for the LE. At the interior, Sport buyers received a full gauge package, floor carpet, an upgraded stereo cassette player and radio, carpeted logo floor mats, a charcoal/silver "deluxe" cloth interior with bench seat with center armrest, a leather-wrapped sport steering wheel, and remote controlled outside mirrors.

Fuel injection replaced the carburettors on the 3.9 L V6 for 1988, but the rated output remained the same. Power windows and locks were now made optional.

For 1989, the Dakota convertible was introduced. It featured a fixed roll bar and a simple manual top. The idea came from Jerry York and they were manufactured by ASC (American Sunroof Company). About 2,482 were sold during the first year.

Another addition that year was Carroll Shelby's V8-powered Shelby Dakota, his first rear-wheel drive vehicle in two decades.

An extended Club Cab model was added for 1990, still with two doors. This model offered six-passenger seating, though the rear seat was best suited for cargo, children, and shorter adults.

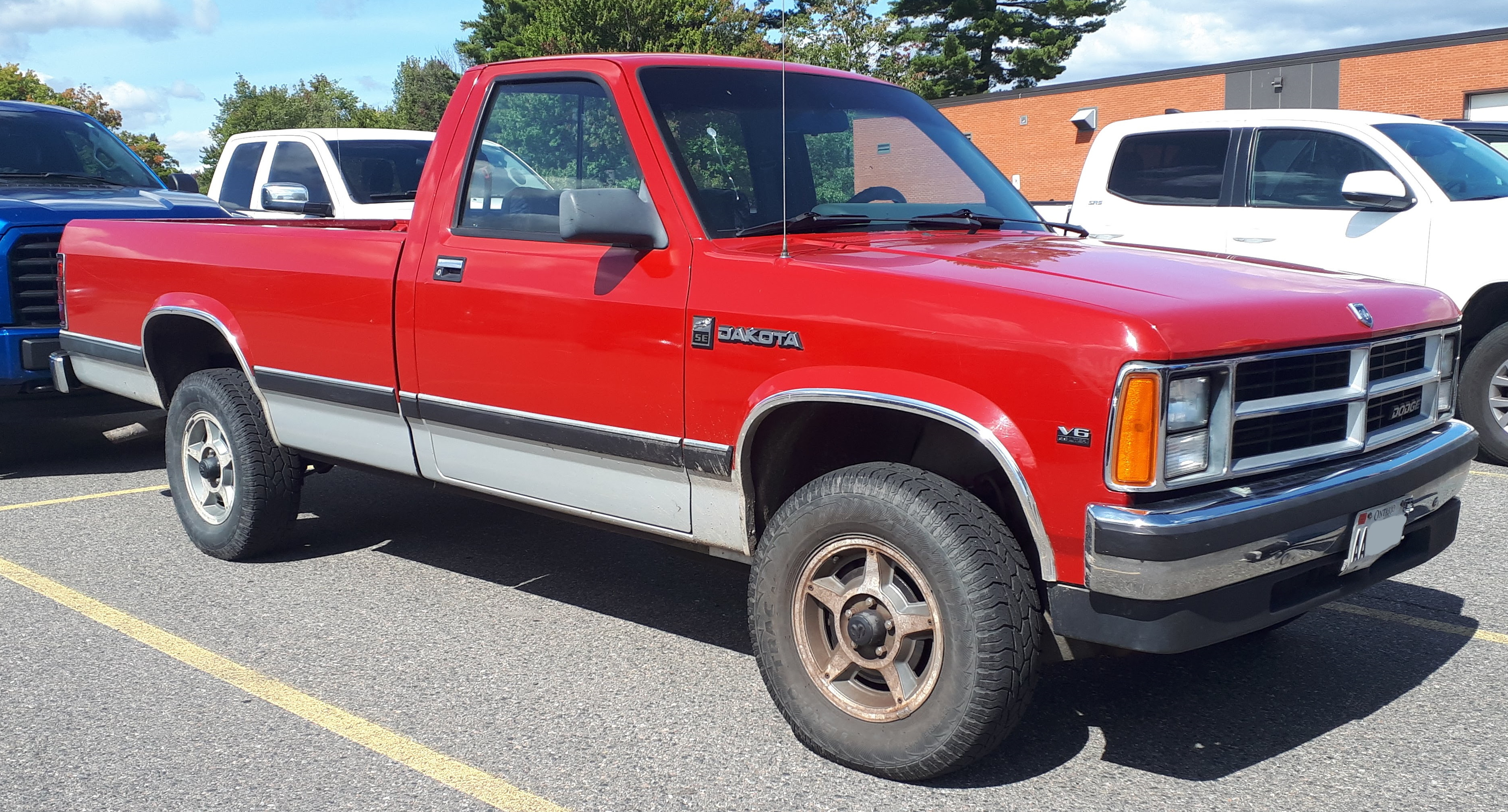
1990 Dodge Dakota

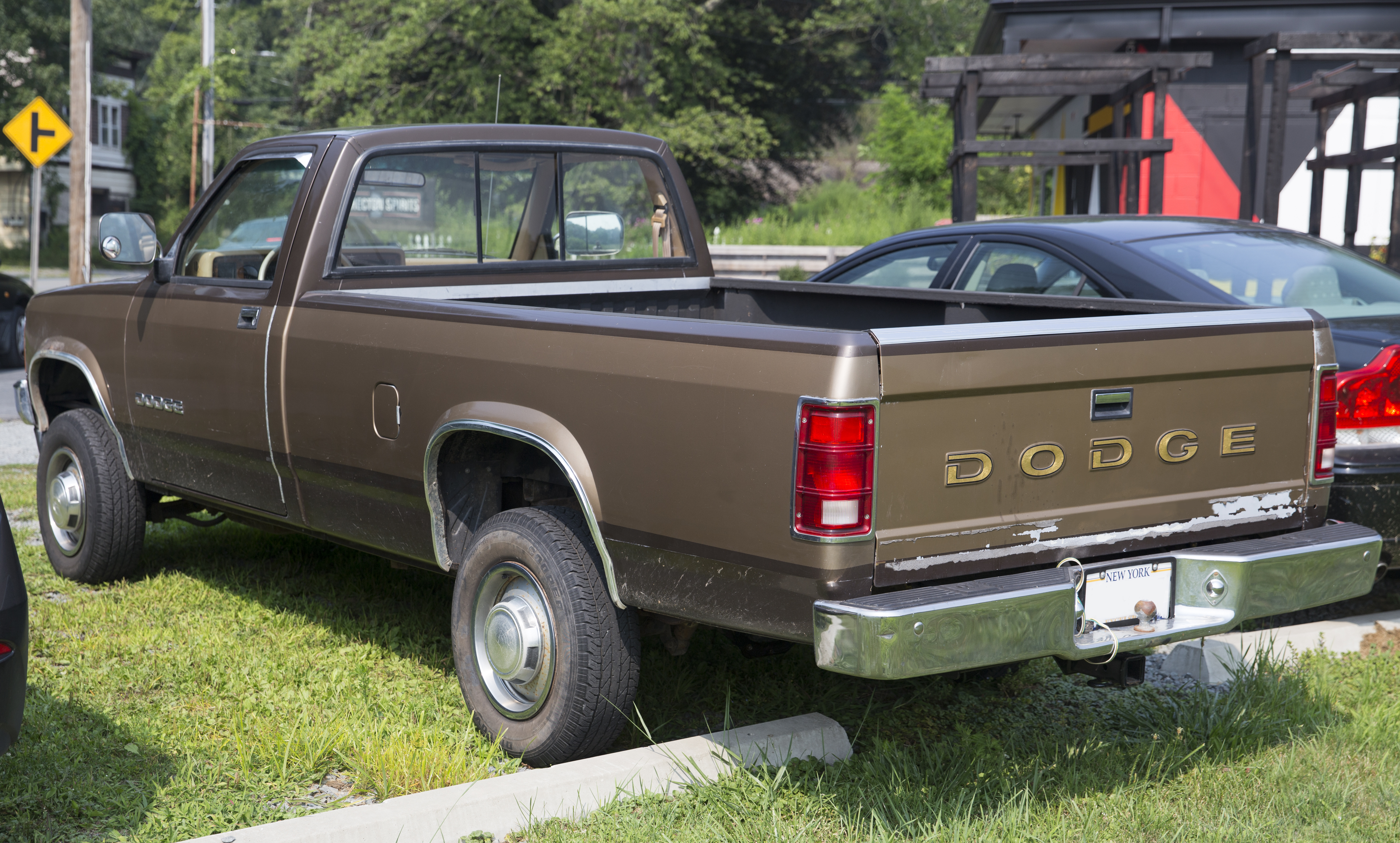
1988 Dodge Dakota; rear view

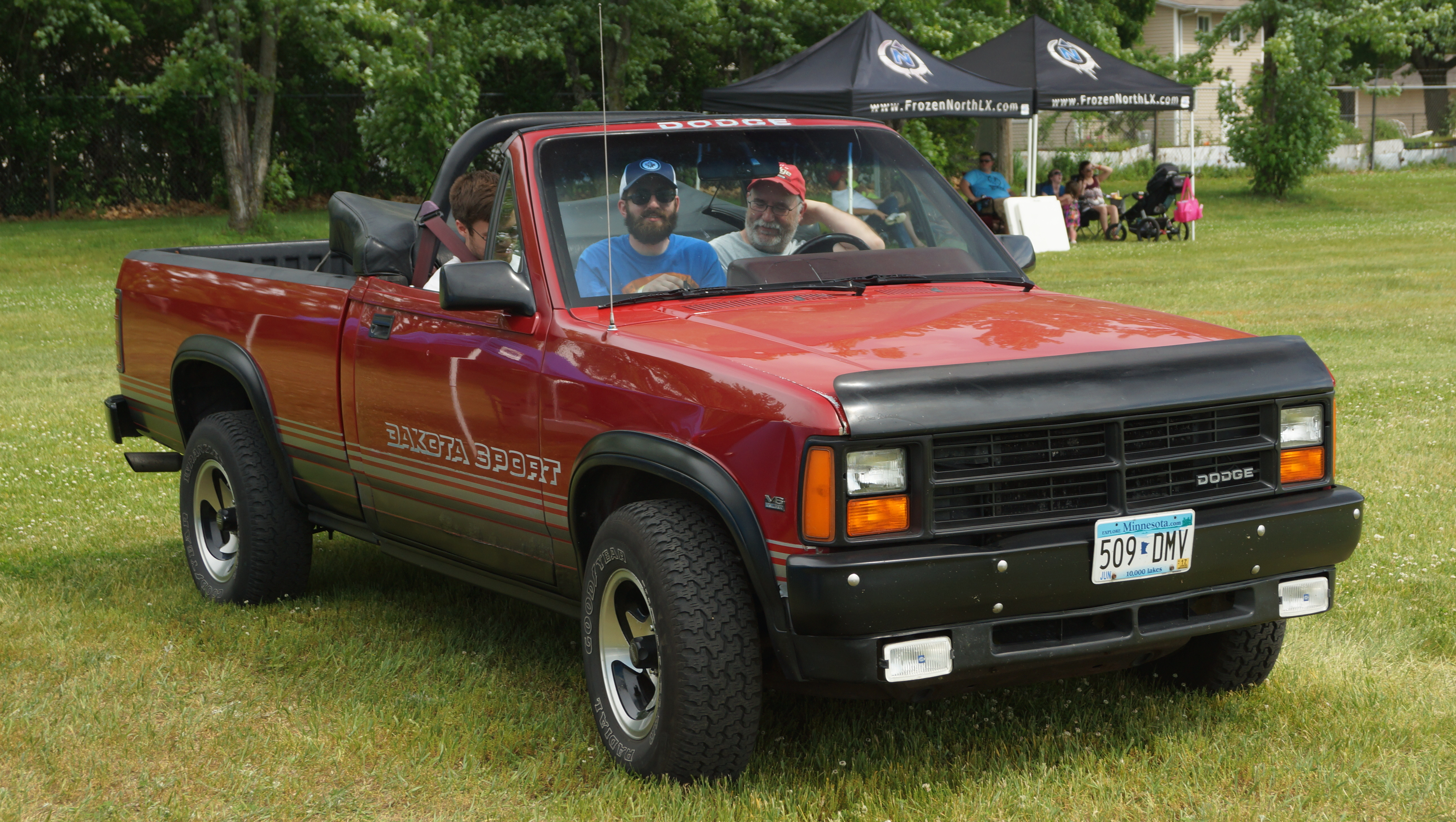
1989 Dodge Dakota Sport convertible

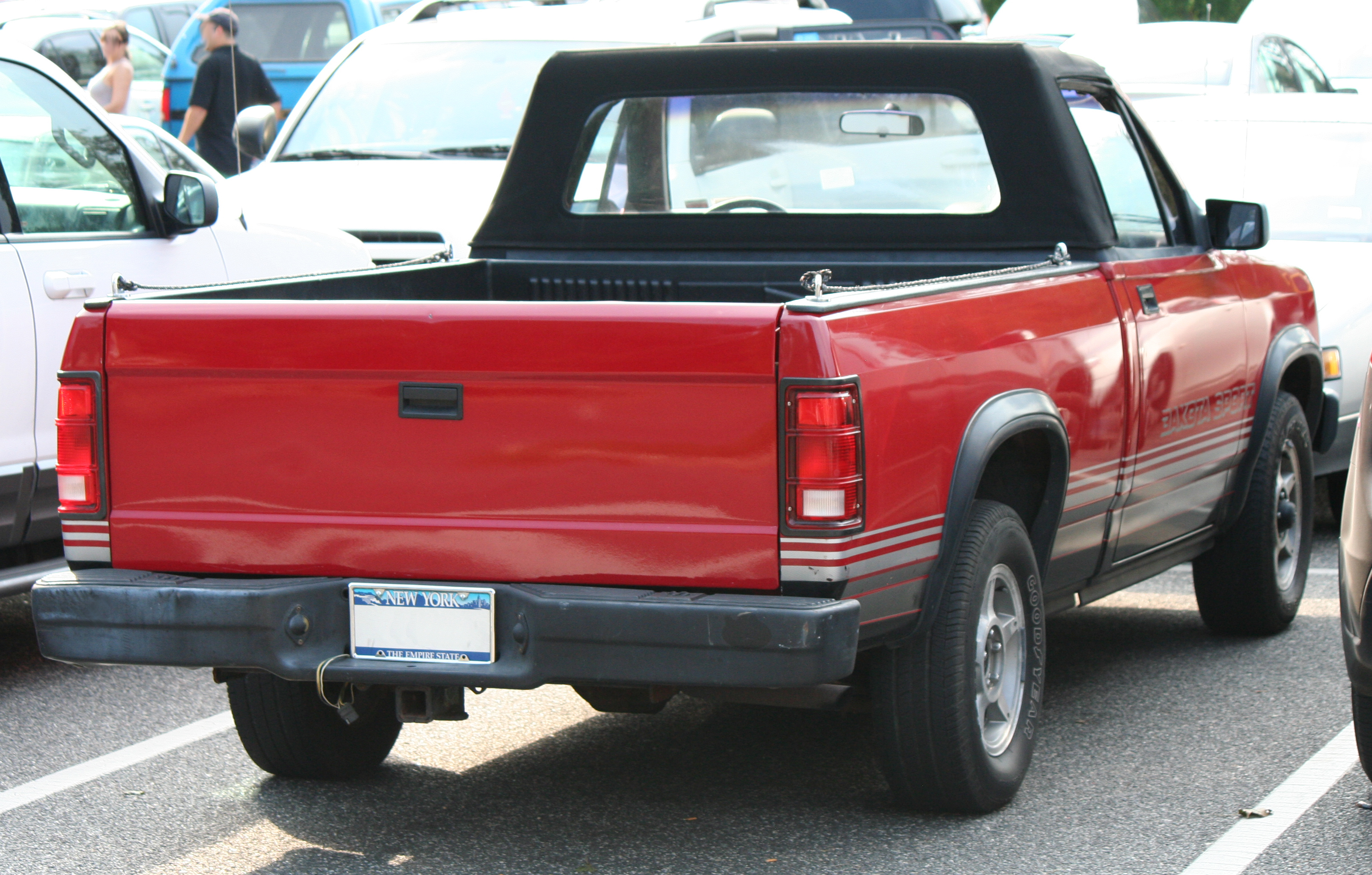
Dakota Sport Convertible; rear view

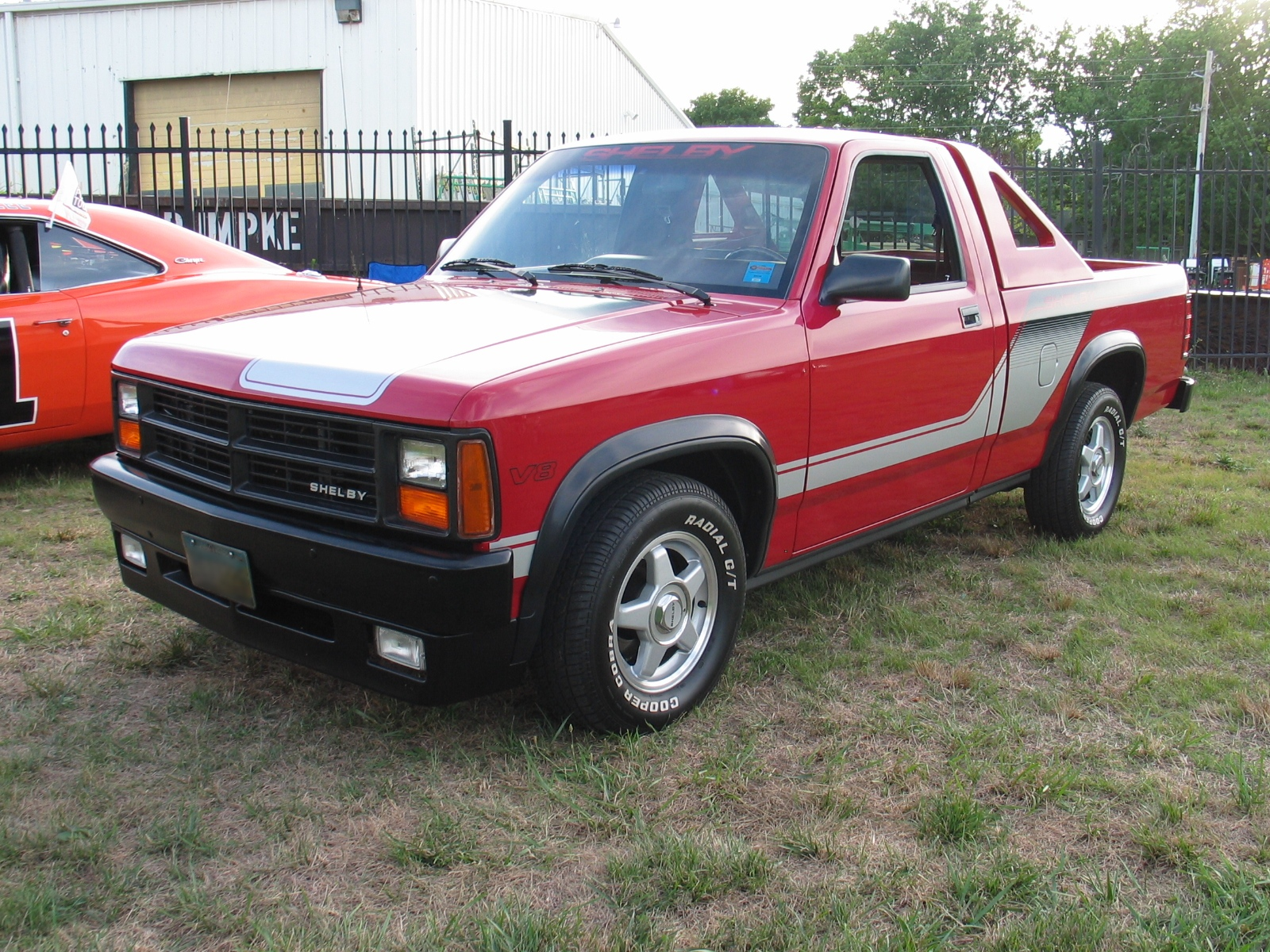
1989 Dodge Shelby Dakota

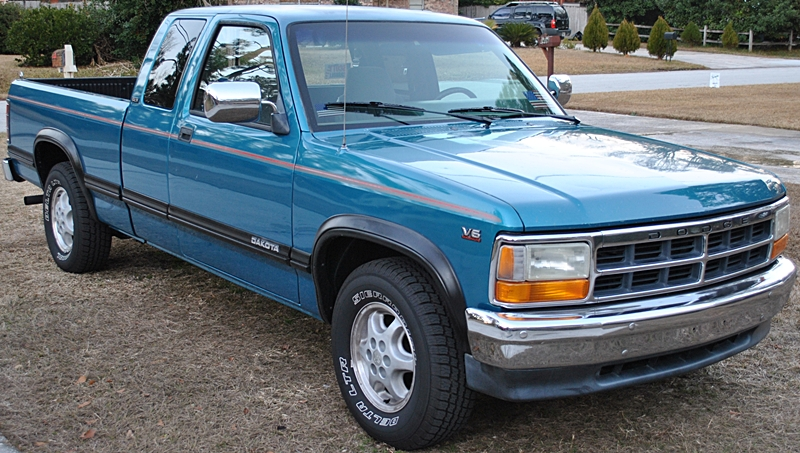
1991–1996 Dodge Dakota Club Cab

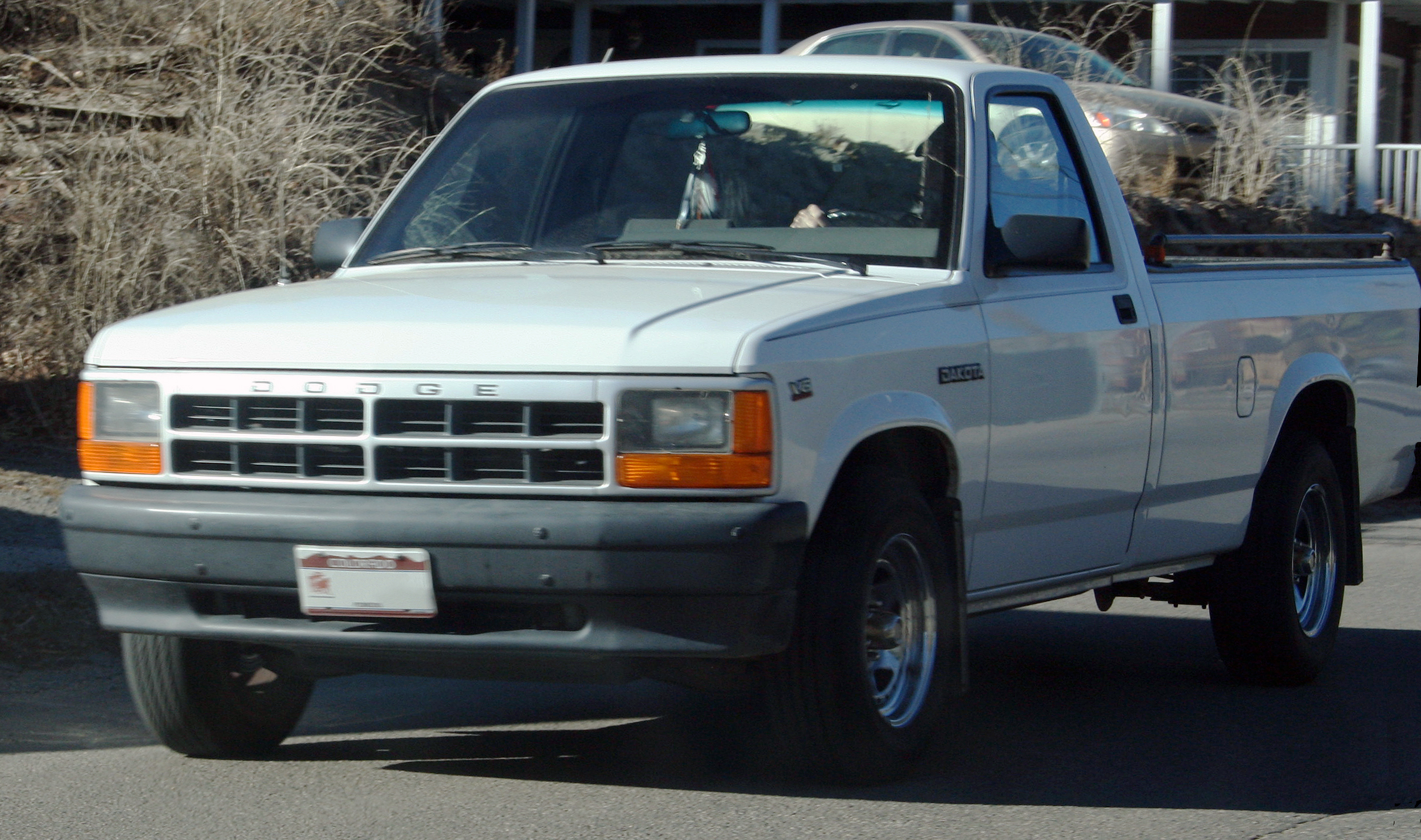
1991-only facelifted Dodge Dakota with sealed-beam headlights

The 1991 model year featured a new grille and hood for better access with optional 170 hp (127 kW) 5.2 L V8, which was included with the previous Shelby Dakota V8 option. By the end of 1991, the standard square sealed-beam glass headlamps were phased out for the aerodynamic-style molded plastic headlamps attached to the grille components. It was equipped with halogen lights, making 1991 the only model year for a unique front-end for the Dakota. Also debuting on 1991 models were six-bolt road wheels (replacing the earlier five-bolt versions).

This was the last year for the Dakota convertible. To fulfill the Dodge division's commitment to the American Sunroof Company, production of the convertible version was extended into the 1991 model year. A total of eight were built. Unlike the previous years, colors and options varied more than before. This version was not advertised and did not appear in sales literature.

The 3.9 L V6 and 5.2 L V8 engines were updated to Magnum specifications for 1992, increasing rated power to 180 and 230 hp (134 and 172 kW), respectively. The engines now had multiport electronic fuel injection (EFI) with Chrysler's powertrain control module which was partially responsible for the improved performance.

The 1994 model year had a few minor changes, with the most notable being the addition of a standard driver's-side airbag, located in a new, two-spoke steering wheel (also found in the Ram). Other changes included the discontinuation of the "SE" and "LE" trims. In following with the all-new Ram full-sized pickups, the top-end trim was renamed to "SLT," with these models (along with select others) including new chrome-finished, styled six-bolt steel wheels styled similar to the five-bolt type found on the larger Ram. Other changes included revisions to color and overall trim options. SRS airbags were also added for 1994. A CD player became optional, as did a combination cassette player and CD player unit. Leather seats were also available on LE models. New alloy wheels were available.

The 1996 model was the final year of the first-generation. The base K-based 2.5-liter SOHC I4 engine was discontinued; it had been considered vastly underpowered compared to the competition. It was replaced by the 2.5 L AMC straight-4 engine, with an OHV valvetrain and rated at 120 hp (89 kW). This was the only major change for 1996, and the AMC 2.5 L engine continued as the standard engine in the new, larger 1997 model.

=== Li'l Red Express Dakota and Dakota Warrior ===
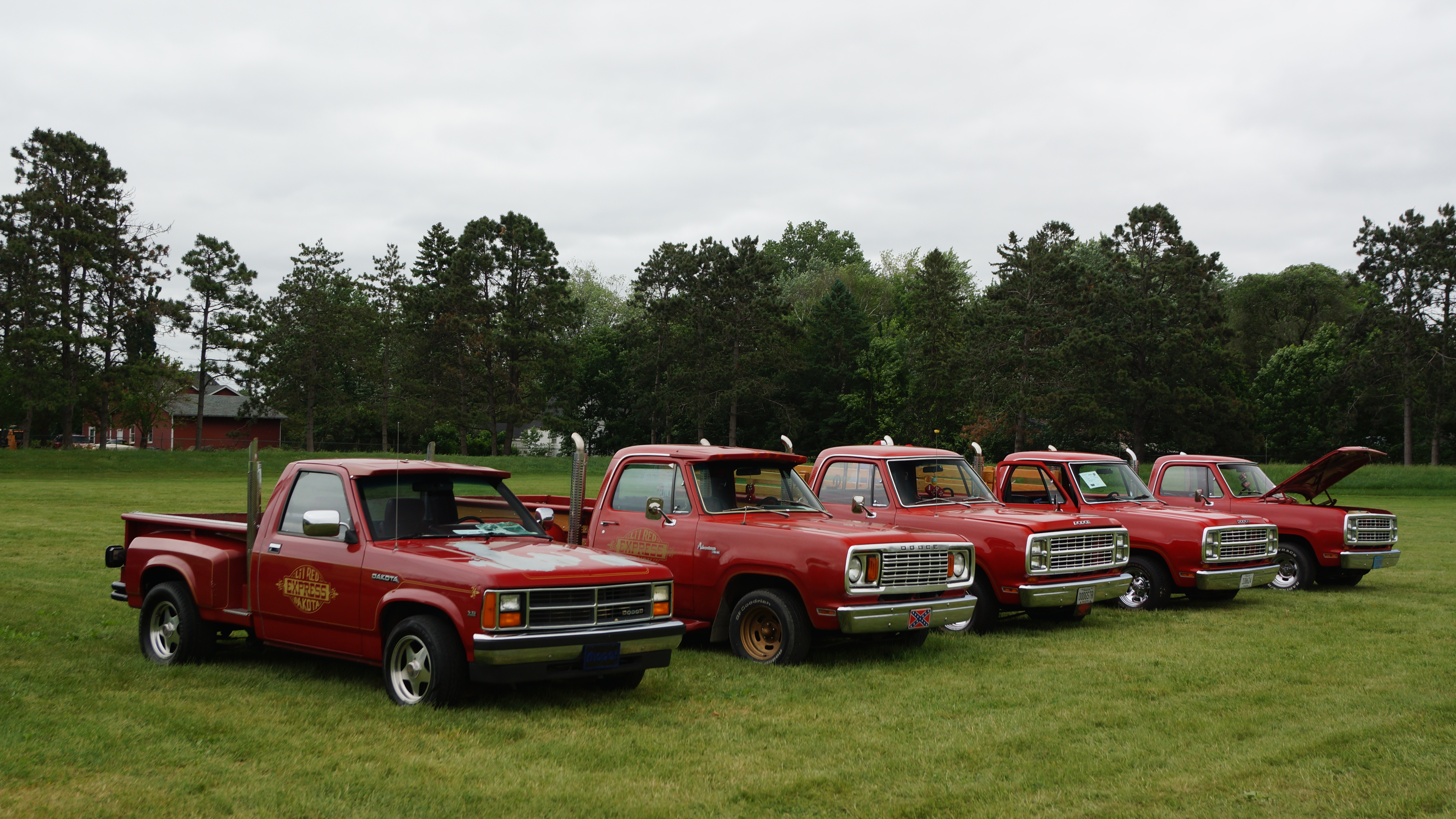
Dodge Dakota Li'l Red Express next to four of the original Dodge Lil Red Express trucks

Two special editions of the first were constructed with step-side beds. Both were constructed by L.E.R. Industries of Edwardsburg, Michigan. The step-side beds were constructed out of fiberglass and galvanneal. Wooden bed rails were also available.

The Li'l Red Express Dakota was made to resemble the original 1978–1979 Express models that were based on the Dodge D series. It featured the step-side bed and dual vertical exhaust stacks behind the cab that were non-functional. The Dakota Warrior was made to resemble the Warlock trim from the late 1970s. Warriors included the bed as the Express, but lacked the vertical exhaust stacks. Both the Express and Warrior Dakotas had a graphics package made to resemble those of the original models.

Production numbers for the Expresses and Warriors were in the hundreds. A few were made with the 5.2 L Magnum V8 engine, which was only an option during 1992, the final model year of Express and Warrior.

=== Models ===
The first generation Dodge Dakota came in three basic models:

The Dakota S was the base trim level. It included the following standard features: base vinyl seating surfaces, radio delete package, and audio system delete package (later, an AM/FM stereo with a two-speaker audio system became standard equipment on the Dakota model with a two-speaker audio system), a heater with fan control, vinyl flooring, a black front grille and front bumper, full-faced steel wheels, all-season tires, and manual "roll-up" windows and door locks. A black painted back step bumper, air conditioning, AM/FM or AM/FM/cassette radio, and power steering were extra-cost options. This model was not typically seen as a Club Cab model, and also was not available with a V8 engine option like the other Dakota models were.

The Sport was the mid-range trim level. It added features such as vinyl-and-cloth-trimmed seating surfaces, an AM/FM stereo with a two-speaker audio system, sport-styled steel wheels, bodyside cladding delete, a tilt-adjustable steering column and wheel, and interior accents to the base Dakota model. Later, it also added chrome-clad steel wheels, as well as a color-keyed front fascia and front grille, and "Sport" decals that adorned the doors and pickup bed sides of the Dakota. V6 and V8 engines were available on the Sport model.

The Sport convertible was the only convertible Dakota available, and only from 1989 until 1991, when it was discontinued. It added the following features to the mid-range Sport trim level: sport-styled alloy wheels, cloth seating surfaces with vinyl inserts and accents, an AM/FM stereo with cassette player and a four-speaker audio system, air conditioning, a manual-folding vinyl convertible roof, and "Sport" decals on the doors of the Dakota. The V6 engine and two-door regular cab was the only available configuration of the Sport convertible.

The LE, later renamed SLT, was the top-of-the-line trim level. It added features such as cloth seating surfaces, air conditioning, an AM/FM stereo with cassette player and a four-speaker audio system, alloy wheels, bodyside cladding, carpeted flooring, and power windows and door locks to the mid-range Sport model. V6 and V8 engines were available on LE or SLT models.

=== Engines ===
- 1987–1988: 2.2 L (135 cu in) K I4, SOHC, 94 hp (70 kW)
- 1987–1991: 3.9 L (239 cu in) LA V6, 125 hp (93 kW)
- 1989–1995: 2.5 L (152 cu in) K I4, 100 hp (75 kW)
- 1991: 5.2 L (318 cu in) LA V8, 170 hp (127 kW)
- 1992–1993: 3.9 L (239 cu in) Magnum V6, 180 hp (134 kW)
- 1992–1993: 5.2 L (318 cu in) Magnum V8, 230 hp (172 kW)
- 1994–1996: 3.9 L (239 cu in) Magnum V6, 175 hp (130 kW)
- 1994–1996: 5.2 L (318 cu in) Magnum V8, 225 hp (168 kW)
- 1996: 2.5 L (150 cu in) AMC I4, 120 hp (89 kW)

== Second generation (1997–2004) ==
Second generation
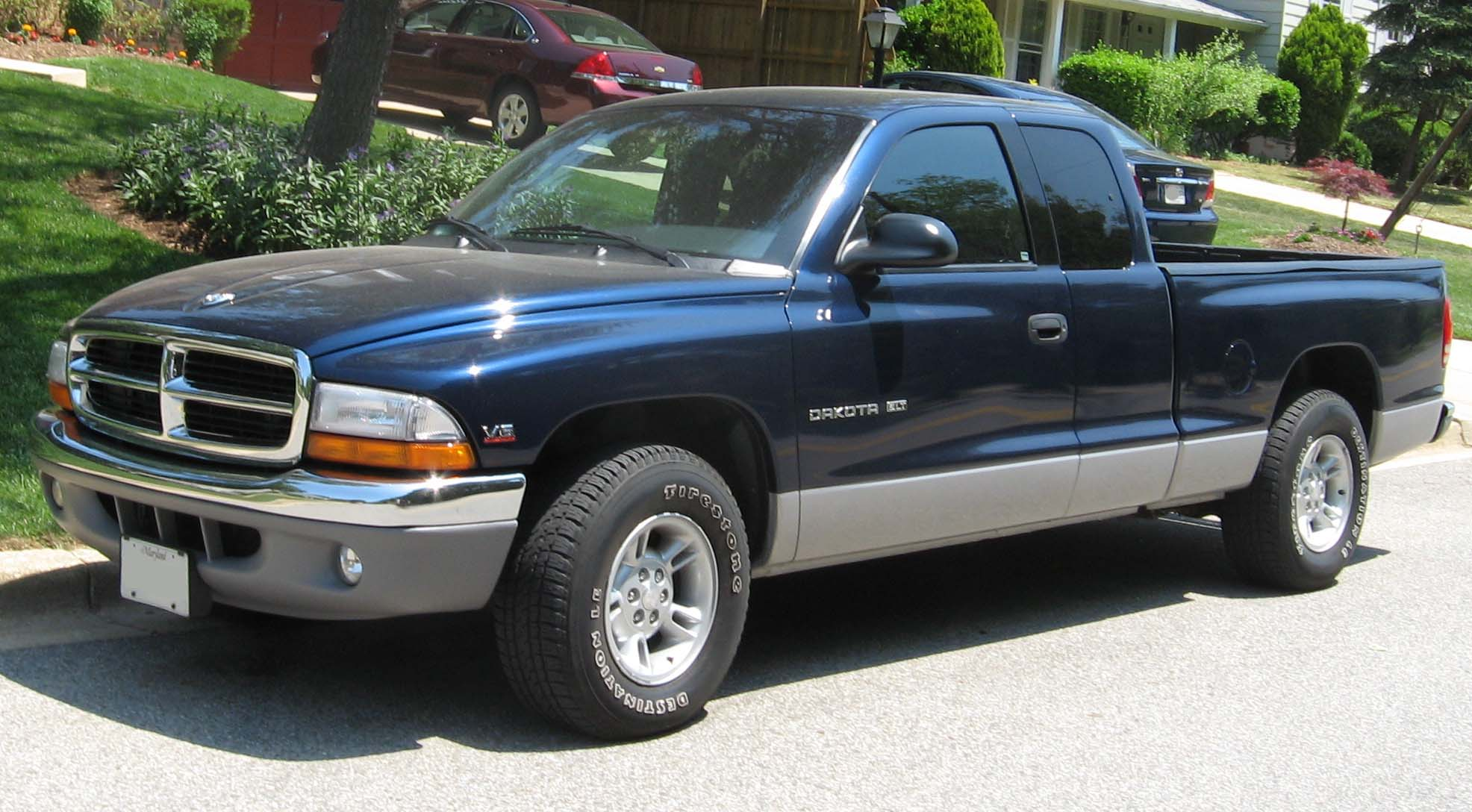

Overview
- Production: July 1996 – July 2004 (North America); 1998–2001 (Brazil)
- Model years: 1997–2004
- Designer: Dennis Myles (1993)

Body and chassis
- Body style: 2-door pickup truck 4-door pickup truck
- Platform: Chrysler DN platform
- Related: Dodge Durango (DN)

Powertrain
- Engine: 2.5 L AMC I4; 2.5 L 425 OHV I4 Diesel (Brazil); 3.9 L Magnum V6; 5.2 L Magnum V8; 5.9 L Magnum V8; 4.7 L PowerTech V8; 3.7 L PowerTech V6
- Transmission: 4-speed 42RE automatic 4-speed 44RE automatic 4-speed 46RE automatic 4-speed 45RFE automatic 5-speed 545RFE automatic 5-speed NV1500 manual 5-speed NV3500 manual 5-speed AX-15 manual

Dimensions
- Wheelbase: 111.9 in (2,842 mm) (regular cab/6.5' bed); 123.9 in (3,147 mm) (regular cab/8' bed); 131.0 in (3,327 mm) (Club Cab, Quad Cab)
- Length: 1997–2001 Regular Cab: 195.8 in (4,973 mm); 1997–2001 Club Cab & 2002–04 Quad Cab: 215.1 in (5,464 mm); 1997–2001 Club Cab: 214.8 in (5,456 mm); 2002–04: 196.0 in (4,978 mm)/215.0 in (5,461 mm)
- Width: 71.5 in (1,816 mm)
- Height: 1997–99 4WD: 68.0 in (1,727 mm); 1997–99 & 2002–04 Club Cab 4WD: 68.5 in (1,740 mm); 1997–2001 2WD: 65.6 in (1,666 mm)/65.3 in (1,659 mm); 2000–01 4WD: 67.9 in (1,725 mm); 2000–01 Club Cab 4WD: 68.6 in (1,742 mm); 2000–01 Quad Cab Sport 4WD: 68.8 in (1,748 mm); 2000–01 Quad Cab Sport 2WD: 66.3 in (1,684 mm); 2002–04 4WD: 67.3 in (1,709 mm); 2002–04 Club Cab 4WD: 67.4 in (1,712 mm); 2002-04 Quad Cab 4WD: 68.5 in (1,740 mm); 2002–04 2WD: 64.7 in (1,643 mm); 2002–04 Club Cab 2WD: 64.9 in (1,648 mm); 2002–04 Quad Cab 4WD: 65.6 in (1,666 mm)

The second-generation Dakota began development in 1991, with an exterior design proposal by Dennis Myles under design director John R. Starr approved in mid-1993 and frozen for production in January 1994, 30 months ahead of Job 1. Design patents were filed on May 20, 1994, under D373,979 at the USPTO. The 1997 model year Dakota was presented by press release in the summer of 1996 and manufactured from July 1996 through July 2004. The Dakota inherited the semi truck styling of the larger Ram, and used mostly the same mechanicals as its predecessor – with the exception of its steering, which was updated to rack-and-pinion.

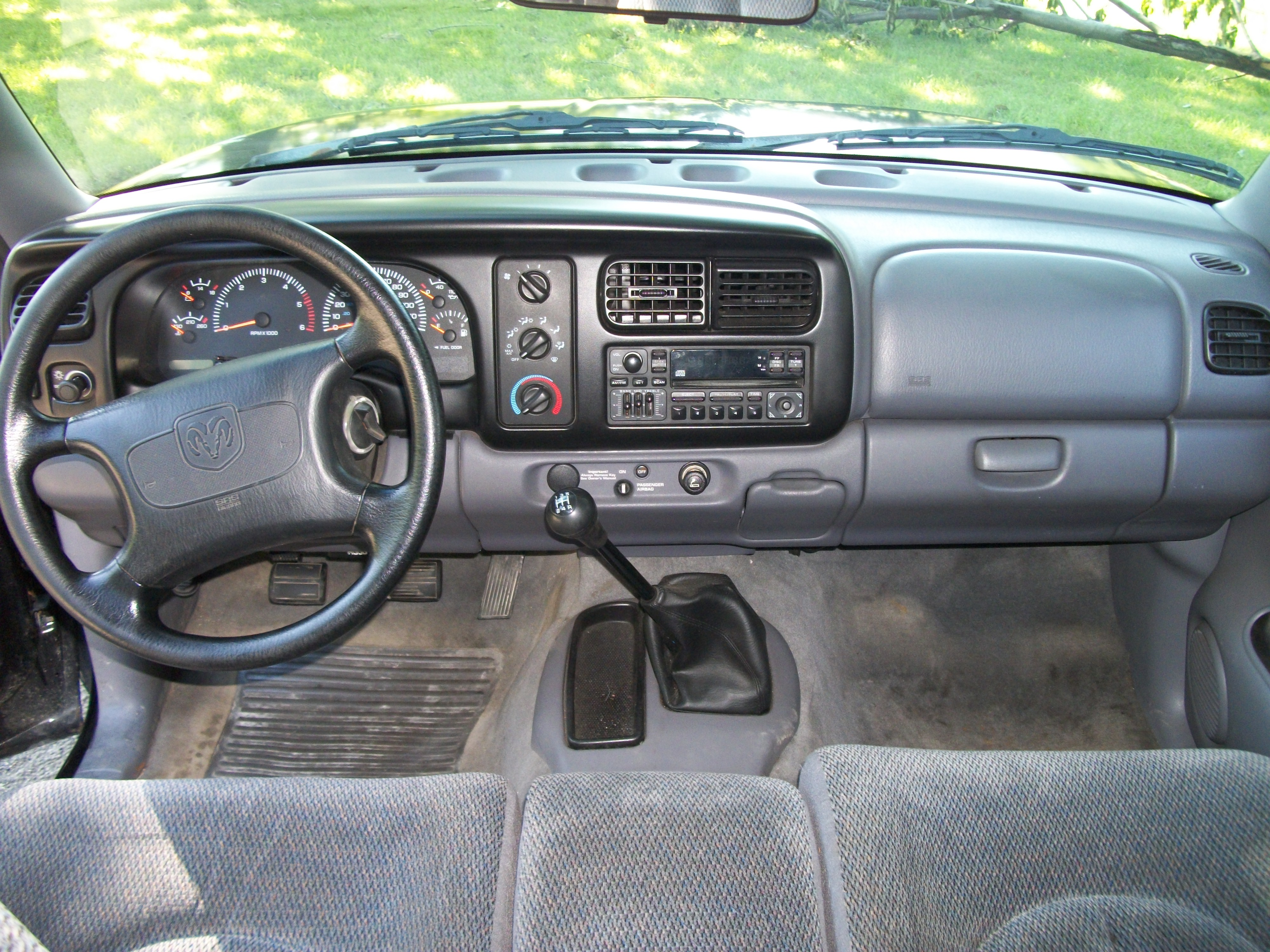
Interior

In the spring of 1998, a limited-edition R/T package was available as an option on the Dakota Sport model from 1998 to 2003. Available in 2WD, it included a 5.9-liter Magnum V8 which produced 250 hp (186 kW) at 4,400 rpm and 345 lb⋅ft (468 N⋅m) of torque at 3,200 rpm, mated to a 46RE four-speed automatic. Notable features included special 17×9" cast aluminum wheels mounted on P255/55R17 tires, monotone paint, bucket seats (with optional center console), thicker front and rear stabilizer bars, a rear axle with limited-slip differential, and suspension, braking, exhaust, and steering systems that were tuned for performance (the steering system from the R/T is the same as that from the standard Dakota), giving the R/T a ride height that was one inch lower than the standard Dakota. Chrome wheels were available on 2002 and 2003 models. Some of the last models made in 2003 came with the new stampede lower body cladding package and a chromed version of the original cast 17×9" aluminum wheels at no extra charge. This version of the R/T Dakota was produced through 2003, with the newer 2003 R/T trucks designated as their own trim line, and no longer as part of an option package on the Dakota Sport trim. The Dakota R/T could accelerate from 0 to 60 mph (97 km/h) in 6.9 seconds and complete a quarter-mile sprint in just over 15 seconds. It had a maximum towing capacity of 1,800 lb (816 kg) and a maximum payload capacity of 970 lb (440 kg).

Also in 1998, the Dakota R1 was released for production in Brazil through the efforts of a small team known as Truck Special Programs and featured a base four-cylinder engine and offered a 2.5 L VMI turbodiesel along with a V8, all designed around a reinforced four-wheel-drive chassis used on both two- and four-wheel-drive models. Altogether, 28 roll-in-chassis R1 configurations were designed for the Brazilian market to be built at the Curitiba assembly facility as CKDs. This program was cancelled when Chrysler was purchased by Daimler.

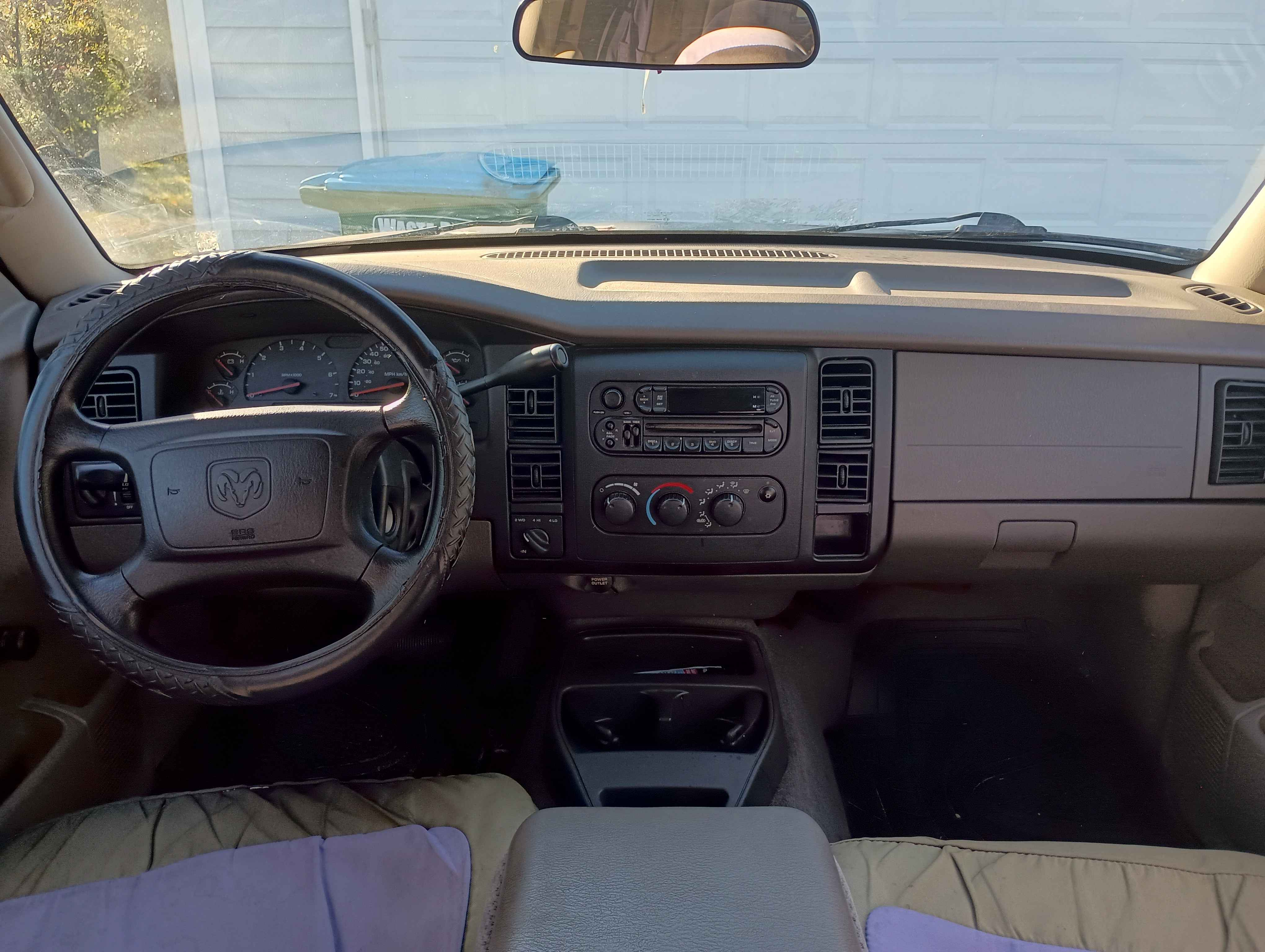
The redesigned interior of post 2001 Dakotas.

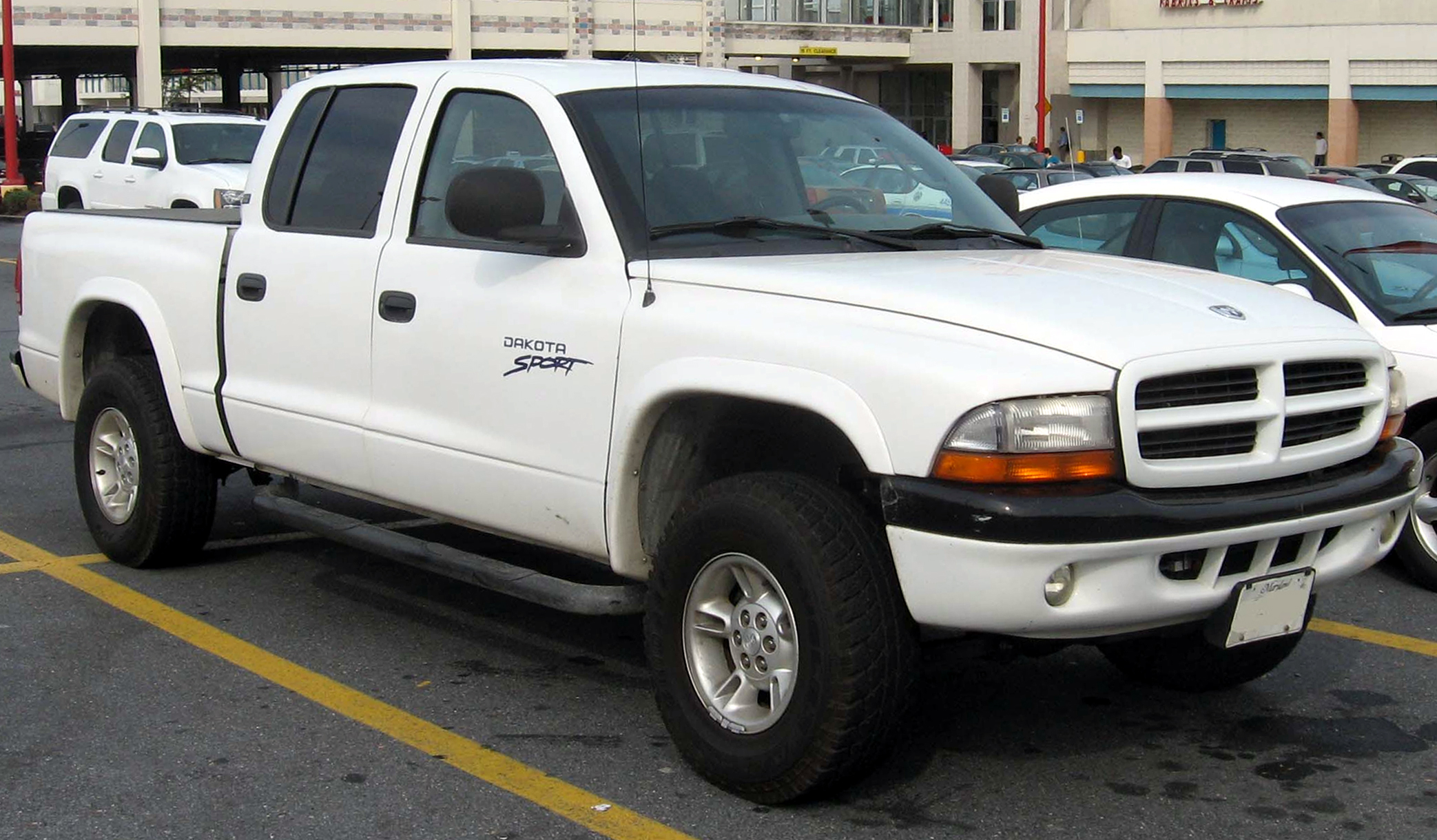
Dodge Dakota Sport Quad Cab

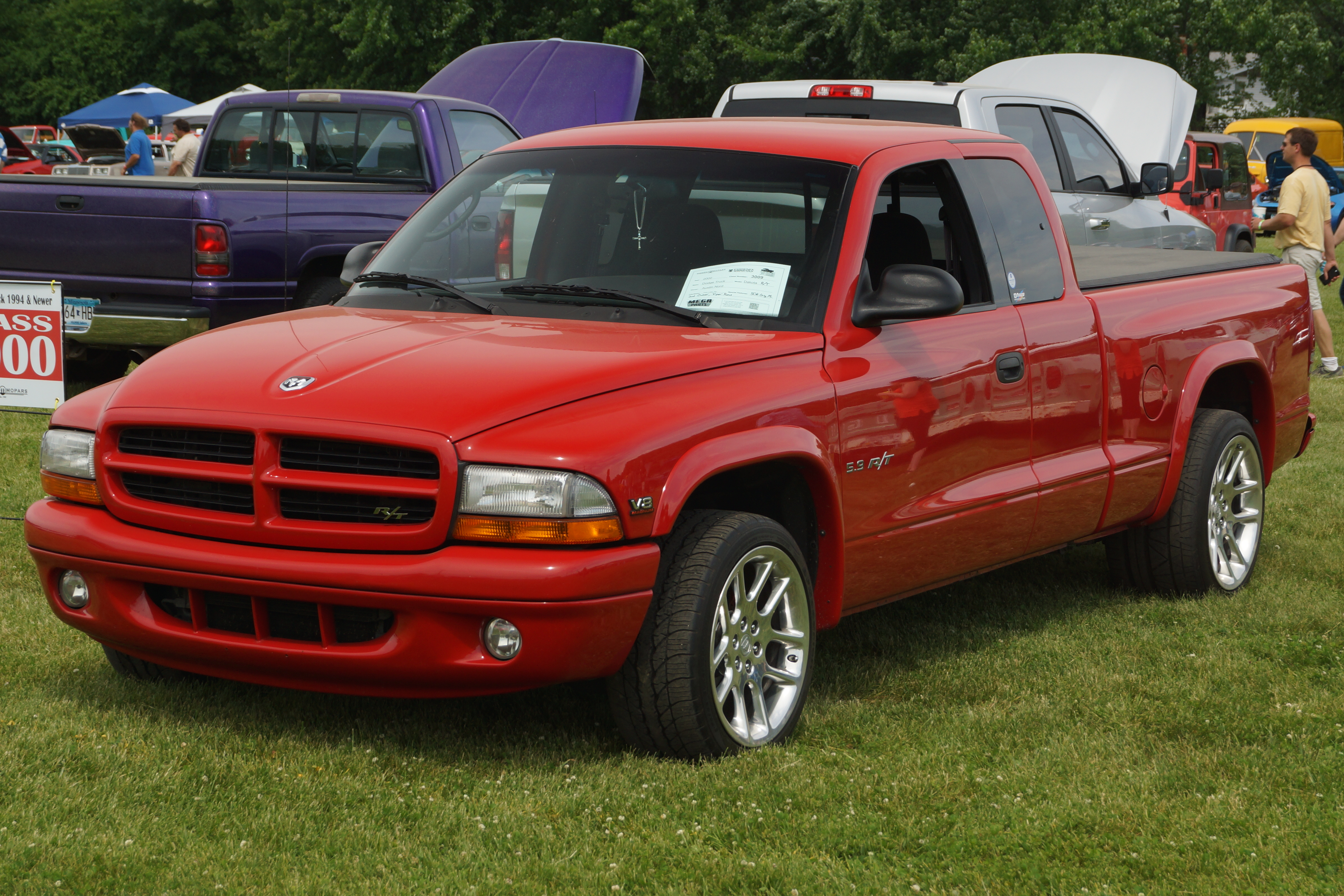
Dodge Dakota 5.9 R/T Extended Cab, with the colour-keyed front bumper

Gone for 2000 was the 8-foot bed on the regular cab, but new for that year was the Quad Cab. Four-door Quad Cab models had a slightly shorter bed, 63 in (1,600 mm), but riding on the Club Cab's 131.0 in (3,327 mm) wheelbase. The Quad Cab featured a full-sized flip-up rear seat to provide room for three passengers in the back or room for cargo. The 5.2 L Magnum V8 was replaced by the 4.7 L SOHC PowerTech V8 that year, and the new 45RFE automatic transmission was introduced.

A revision of the interior was made for the 2001 models, including a completely redesigned dash, door panels, and revised seats. Other minor trim revisions were made, including redesigned aluminum wheels on various models. There were also new radio options, with only the standard AM/FM radio (with no cassette deck) being discontinued, making an AM/FM radio with a cassette deck standard on all models. The AM/FM radio with CD player or with both the cassette and CD players was also available.

The 2002 model was the final year for the four-cylinder engine in the Dakota, as Chrysler ended production of the American Motors Corporation design. Most were built with the V6 or V8 engines that were more powerful. An automatic transmission was not available with the four-cylinder engine. SIRIUS Satellite Radio was also now available as an option, and revised radios with new wiring harnesses could accommodate this new feature. A CD changer radio was also available, eliminating the need for a separately mounted unit located elsewhere inside the truck. The drivers could load up to six discs into the unit at a time and could switch out the discs at any time. Radio Data System became standard equipment on some radios.

The 2003 model marked the end of the OHV V6 and the big R/T V8; the 2004 model year vehicles were available with a new 3.7 L PowerTech V6 engine and the 4.7 L V8 variant.

In 2004, the cassette deck option was discontinued, and a CD player became standard equipment on all models.

This generation was also assembled and sold in Brazil from 1998 to 2001.

=== Trim levels ===
The 1997–2004 Dodge Dakota was available in several different trim levels:

The ST served as the base model of the Dakota. It included features such as an AM/FM stereo (later with cassette player) and a four-speaker sound system, vinyl-trimmed seating surfaces, front (or front and rear) bench seats, styled steel fifteen-inch (later sixteen-inch) wheels, and vinyl flooring. It also included, and was only available with, the 3.9 L (later 3.7 L) V6 engine. The ST was not offered as a four-door Quad Cab model.

The Sport served as the "step-up" Dakota model. It added the following features to the ST model: an AM/FM stereo with a cassette player (later, a single-disc CD player), cloth seating surfaces, sport-styled alloy wheels, and carpeted flooring. It was available with all engines except for the high-performance 5.9 L V8.

The SXT, introduced for the 2001 model year served as the "mid-range" Dakota model. It added the following features to the Sport model: an AM/FM stereo with a single-disc CD player, air conditioning, power windows and door locks with keyless entry (available as an option), and a premium interior. It was available with all engines except for the high-performance 5.9 L V8 engine. An SXT Plus model was available that added "value" features such as an AM/FM stereo with cassette and single-disc CD players with integral CD changer controls, a premium cloth interior, and sixteen-inch alloy wheels.

The SLT was the "top-line" Dakota model from late 2000. It added the following features to the SXT model (2001 to 2004 model years) or the Sport model (1997 to 2000 model years): power windows and door locks (Sport only) with keyless entry, a premium interior (Sport only), and premium-styled alloy or chrome-clad wheels. It was available with all available engines on the Dakota. An SLT Plus Package was available that added "value" features to the SLT model, such as sixteen-inch alloy wheels, an AM/FM stereo with cassette and CD players (and integral CD changer controls on 2001 through 2004 model years), and a premium cloth interior.

The R/T, otherwise known as the 5.9 R/T, was known as the "high-performance" and "top-line" Dakota model from 1998 to 2003. It added the following features to the SLT model: sport front seats, sport-styled chrome-clad wheels, larger performance-rated tires, an AM/FM stereo with cassette and single-disc CD players, a six-speaker Infinity amplified premium audio system, and the high-performance 5.9 L V8 engine. It was available in all available Dakota models except for the 4-door Quad Cab model.

=== Engines ===
Years	Engine	Power	Torque	Notes
1997–2002	2.5 L (150 cu in) AMC I4	120 hp (89 kW)	140 lb⋅ft (190 N⋅m)	
1997–2003	3.9 L (239 cu in) Magnum V6	175 hp (130 kW)	225 lb⋅ft (305 N⋅m)	
1997–1999	5.2 L (318 cu in) Magnum V8	225 hp (168 kW)	295 lb⋅ft (400 N⋅m)	
1998–2003	5.9 L (360 cu in) Magnum V8	250 hp (186 kW)	345 lb⋅ft (468 N⋅m)	R/T
1999–2001	2.5 L (152.5 cu in) VM-425 OHV I4	114 hp (85 kW)	221 lb⋅ft (300 N⋅m)	Brazil only
2000–2004	4.7 L (287 cu in) PowerTech V8	230 hp (172 kW)	295 lb⋅ft (400 N⋅m)	
2004	3.7 L (226 cu in) PowerTech V6	210 hp (157 kW)	235 lb⋅ft (319 N⋅m)	

=== Safety ===
1998 Dodge Dakota (2-door) on IIHS
Category	Rating
Moderate overlap front	Poor

NHTSA crash test ratings (2003, 4-door):

- Frontal Crash Test – Driver:
- Frontal Crash Test – Passenger:
- Side Impact Rating – Driver:
- Side Impact Rating – Rear Passenger:
- Rollover Rating:

== Third generation (2005–2011) ==
Third generation
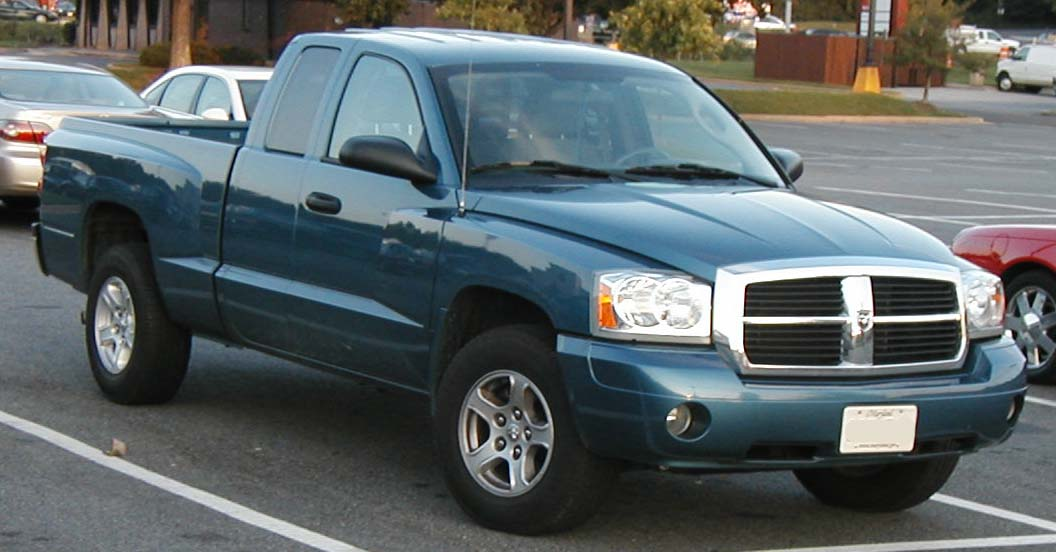

Overview
- Also called: Ram Dakota (2011)
- Production: August 2004 – August 23, 2011
- Model years: 2005–2011
- Designer: Cliff Wilkins (2001)

Body and chassis
- Body style: 4-door pickup truck
- Platform: ND
- Related: Mitsubishi Raider; Dodge Durango (HB)

Powertrain
- Engine: 3.7 L (226 cu in) PowerTech V6; 4.7 L (287 cu in) PowerTech V8
- Transmission: 4-speed 42RLE automatic 5-speed 545RFE automatic 6-speed Getrag 238 manual

Dimensions
- Wheelbase: 131.3 in (3,335 mm)
- Length: 218.8 in (5,558 mm)
- Width: 71.7 in (1,821 mm)
- Height: Club Cab: 68.6 in (1,742 mm); Quad Cab: 68.7 in (1,745 mm)

The redesigned 2005 Dakota still shared its platform with the new Dodge Durango SUV (which was now even more similar to the Ram platform). This model was 3.7 in (94 mm) longer and 2.7 in (69 mm) wider, and features a new front and rear suspension, and rack-and-pinion steering. This new generation model also reverted to five-lug wheels from the prior generation's six-lug wheels to reduce costs and assembly times.

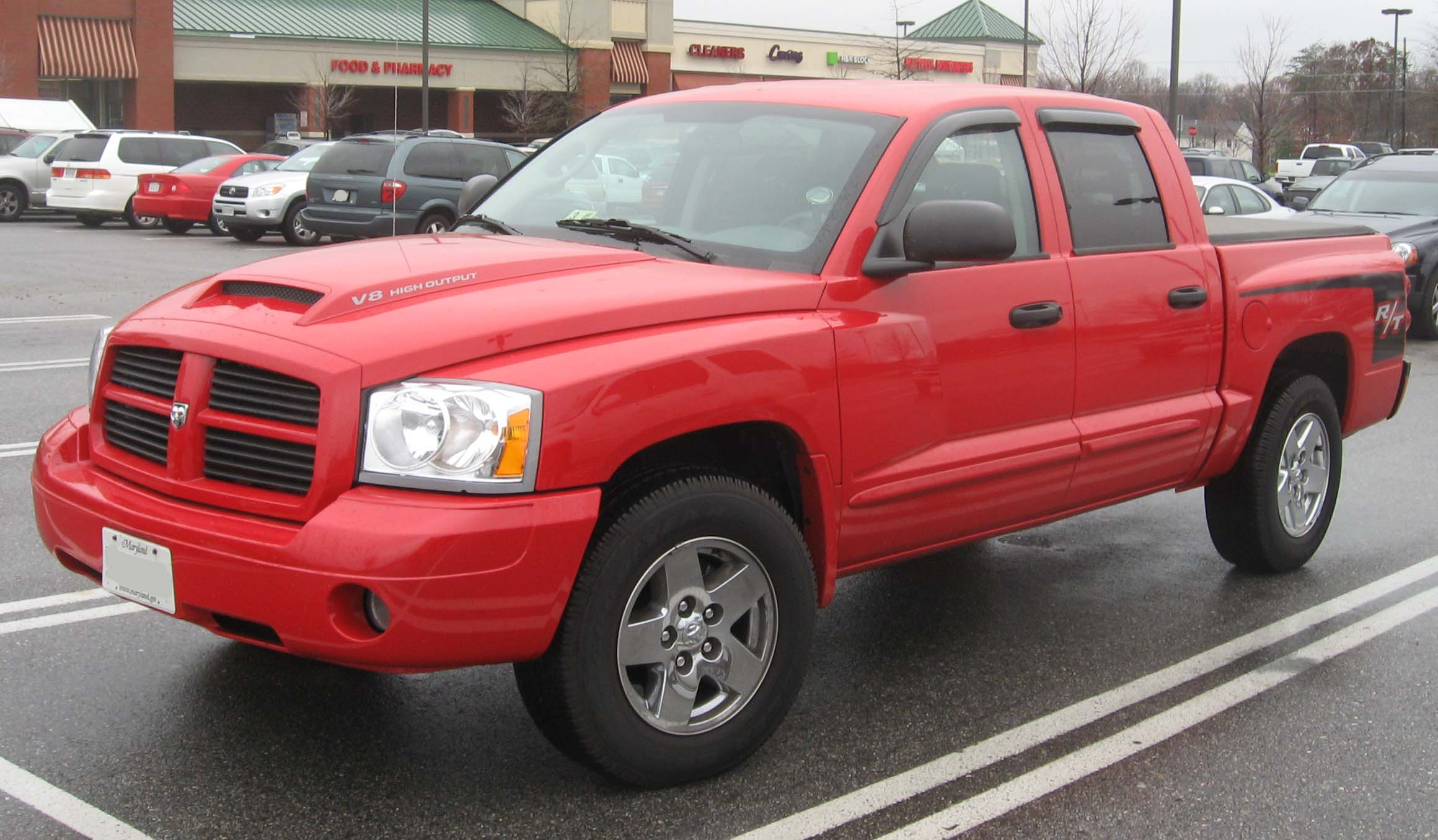
2006 Dodge Dakota R/T

A V6 and two V8 engines were available: The standard engine is a 3.7 L PowerTech V6; the two 4.7 L V8 engines are the standard PowerTech V8 and the V8 High Output or HO. The 3.7 L V6 produces 210 hp (157 kW) and 235 lb⋅ft (319 N⋅m) of torque. The standard-output 4.7 L V8 produces 230 hp (172 kW) and 295 lb⋅ft (400 N⋅m) of torque. The high-output 4.7 L V8 produces 260 hp (194 kW) and 310 lb⋅ft (420 N⋅m) of torque. Both the 3.7 L and standard output 4.7 L V8s were available with the six-speed manual transmission in 2005 and 2006. For 2007, that option was deleted on the V8 models.

In addition to a refresh of the styling, this generation was not offered in a regular cab model. Only the Club and Quad Cab configurations were available. The Dakota R/T returned in late 2005 for the 2006 model year, but only with cosmetic modifications. Despite the "R/T" moniker which signifies "Road and Track," the newest Dakota R/T was simply an option package, characterized by a non-functional hood scoop, exclusive gauge cluster, and hockey stick–style side stripes. The package was available on both two- and four-wheel-drive models.

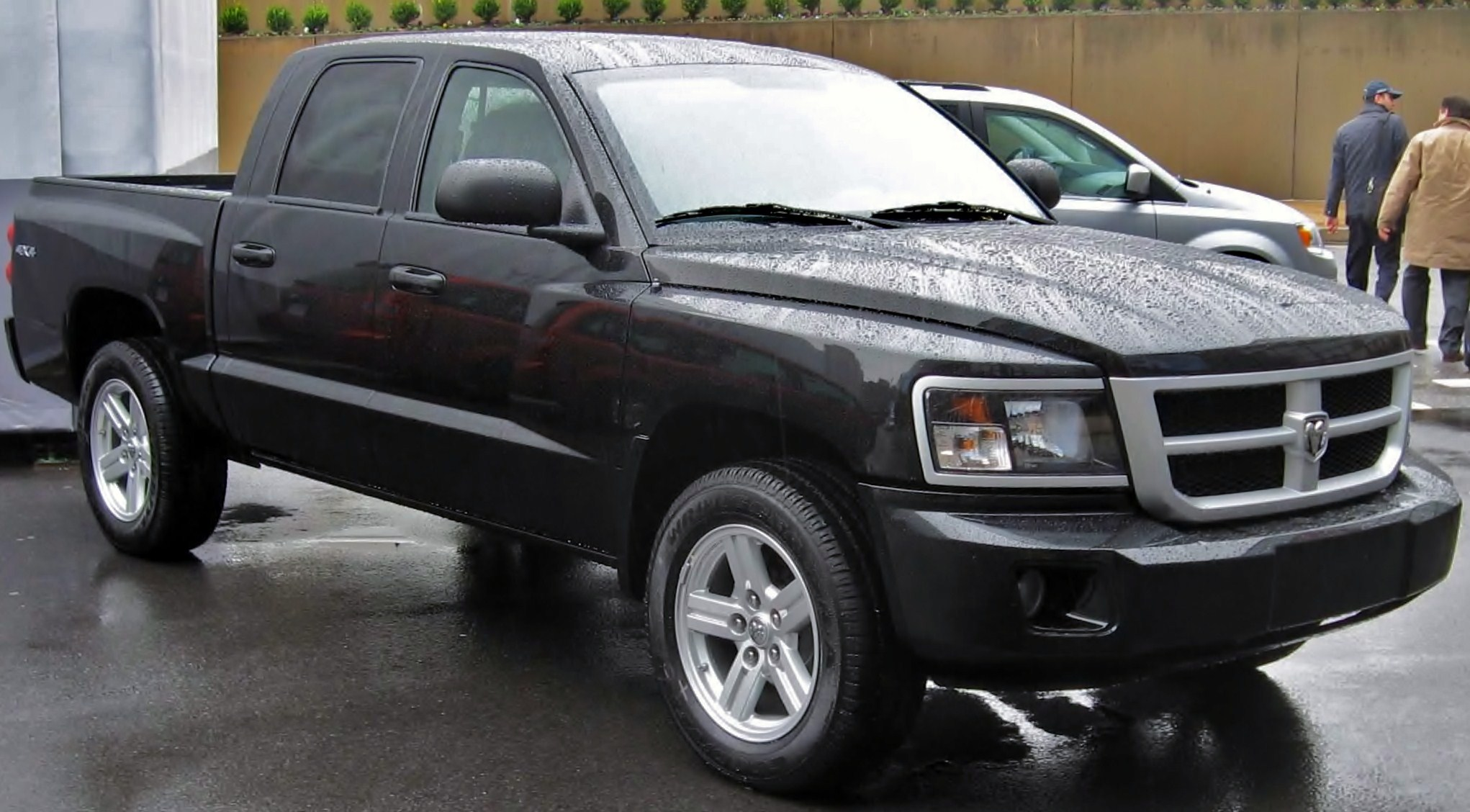
2008 Dakota Quad Cab

The facelifted third-generation Dakota was unveiled at the 2007 Chicago Auto Show as a 2008 model. The Dakota received another facelift and interior upgrade along with a few other upgrades, including built-in cargo-box utility rails, heated bench seats, best-in-class towing (up to 7,050 lb (3,198 kg)), the largest and longest standard bed in the class, and the largest mid-size truck cab. Its new 4.7 L V8 produced 310 hp (231 kW) and 330 lb⋅ft (447 N⋅m) of torque. The standard engine remained the 3.7 L V6 with 210 hp (157 kW) and 235 lb⋅ft (319 N⋅m) of torque. Production began in August 2007.

As of 2010, the Dakota was considered a part of the Ram lineup. However, the "Dodge" emblem still existed on the tailgate, and the truck was interchangeably referred to as a Ram Dakota or Dodge Dakota. Its Mitsubishi Raider sibling was discontinued in 2009.

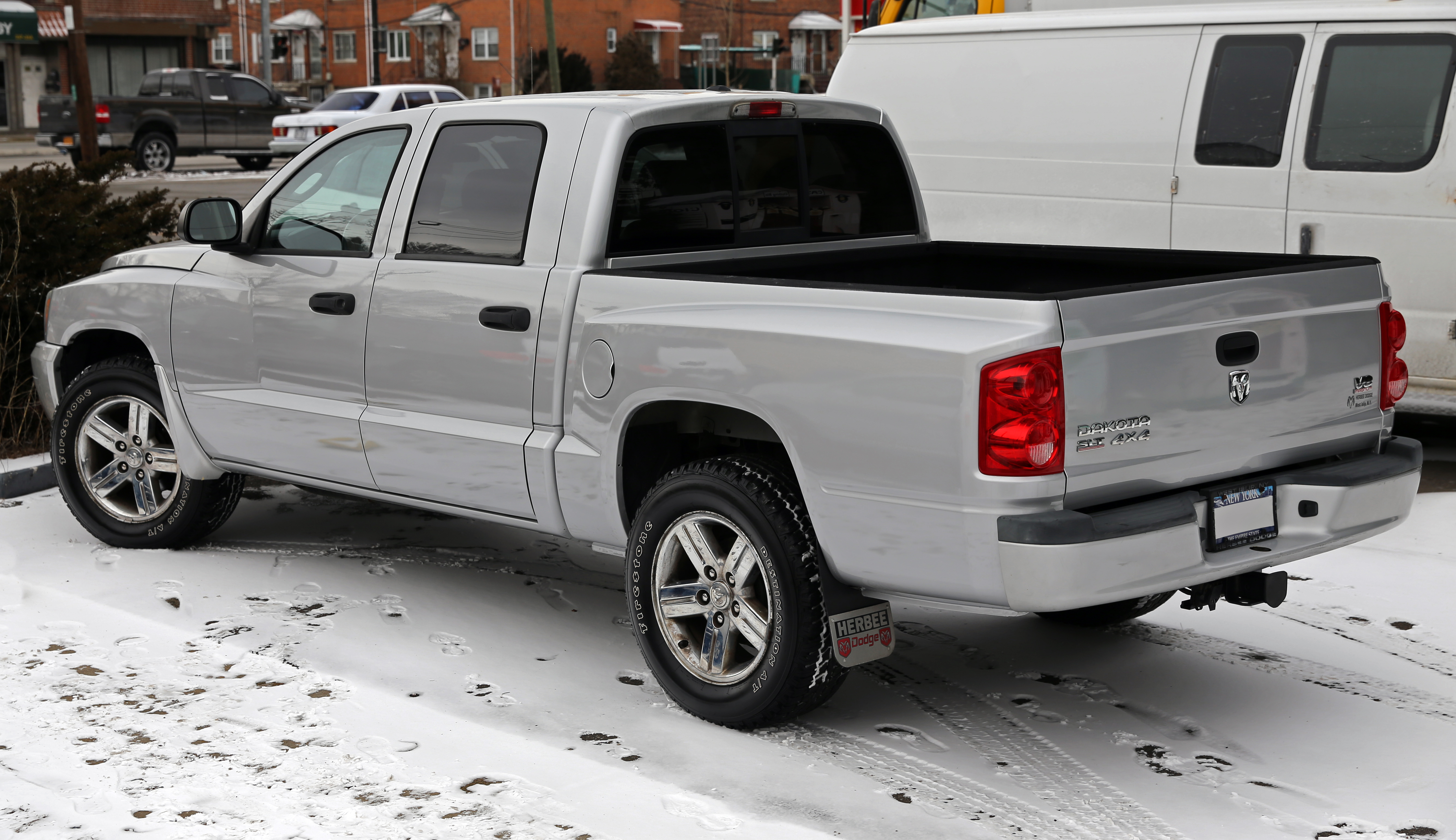
Rear view of a 2007 Dakota Quad Cab

The IIHS gave this generation a "Good" rating in the frontal offset crash test.

=== Models ===
Throughout its production run, the 2005 to 2011 Dodge Dakota was available in three basic models:

The ST served as the base Dakota model. It included the following features: sixteen-inch styled steel wheels, sixteen-inch tires, front cloth bench seats, vinyl-trimmed seating surfaces, manual windows and door locks, black plastic bumpers, an AM/FM stereo with a single-disc CD player (later, single-disc CD/MP3 player), and auxiliary audio input jack (on most models), a four-speaker sound system, air conditioning, a 3.7 L "PowerTech" V6 engine came standard, or the optional 4.7L "PowerTech" V8 Engine also available on the ST model.

The SLT served as the "mid-level" Dakota model. It added the following features to the base ST model: sixteen-inch sport-styled alloy wheels, cloth seating surfaces, and power windows and door locks with keyless entry. The SLT was available with any engine offered on the Dakota. A Big Horn (or Lone Star in Texas) package was also available for the SLT model, which included "value-added" features, as was an SXT package that added a color-keyed front grille, color-keyed front and rear bumpers, and "sport" cloth seating surfaces.

The Laramie, otherwise known as the SLT Laramie, was the "top-line" Dakota model. It added the following features to the "mid-level" SLT model: seventeen-inch chrome-clad alloy wheels, seventeen-inch tires, an AM/FM stereo with a six-disc, in-dash CD/MP3 changer and auxiliary audio input jack (on most models), a premium Infinity (later Alpine) six-speaker amplified audio system, leather-trimmed heated seating surfaces, power front seats, a security system, a five-speed automatic transmission, and the base 4.7 L "PowerTech" V8 engine, though the high-output version of the same engine was also available on the Laramie or SLT Laramie.

=== Safety ===
2008 Dodge Dakota (quad cab) on IIHS
Category	Rating
Moderate overlap front	Good
Side impact	Marginal
Roof strength	Marginal
Head restraints & seats	Acceptable

== Discontinuation ==
The third-generation Dakota was discontinued in 2011, with the last unit coming off the assembly line on August 23, ending the truck's 25-year run. At the time, according to Sergio Marchionne, the CEO of Chrysler Group, the Dakota would not be replaced by a similar vehicle, mostly because of the declining popularity of compact trucks on the North American market. Fiat Chrysler Automobiles announced in September 2014 an agreement with Mitsubishi Motors to codevelop the next-generation Mitsubishi Triton/L200 to be sold globally by both companies. It is sold as RAM 1200 in some Middle Eastern countries.

== Fourth generation (2025–present) ==
=== South American model ===
Fourth generation Dakota (South America)

The South American fourth-generation Dakota released in August 2025, in Argentina. It shares components with the Fiat Titano and is powered by a 2.2-liter diesel producing 197 hp (147 kW) and 332 lb⋅ft (450 N⋅m) of torque. Power is delivered through an 8-speed automatic and standard four-wheel drive.

=== North American model ===
A Dakota for the North American market, a body-on-frame design distinct from the Argentinian model, was confirmed by Stellantis CEO Antonio Filosa in 2025 to be under development.

== Sales ==
Calendar year	US sales
1999	144,148
2000	177,395
2001	154,479
2002	130,712
2003	111,273
2004	105,614
2005	104,051
2006	76,098
2007	50,702
2008	26,044
2009	10,690
2010	13,047
2011	12,156
2012	490
