= StarRotor Corporation =

Startup company founded to commercialize technology

- Type: Private
- Industry: Engineering
- Founded: March 2001
- Headquarters: Bryan, Texas, USA
- Key people: Dr. Mark Holtzapple, President; Dr. Kyle Ross, chemical engineer Andrew Rabroker, mechanical engineer Tom Beck, mechanical engineer
- Products: Compressors; Expanders; Engines (under development); Air Conditioners (under development); Integrated Motors/Generators (under development)
- Website: www.starrotor.com

StarRotor Corporation is a startup company founded to commercialize technology from Texas A&M University. It was incorporated in March 2001 by Dr. Mark Holtzapple and Andrew Rabroker. The company gets its name and logo design from the gerotor the company designed to compress and expand gasses.

== Products Under Development ==
=== StarRotor Engine ===
The StarRotor engine is being designed to use the Brayton cycle instead of the Otto cycle found in almost all gasoline automobiles. It is predicted to be efficient (45%-60% efficiency compared to 15% to 20% efficiency of other engines) and to produce fewer pollutants than traditional engines. Like turbine engines, the StarRotor engine will be capable of running on many types of fuel, including but not limited to gasoline, kerosene, jet fuel, diesel, alcohol, methane, hydrogen, and vegetable oil.

== See also ==
- www.starrotor.com, Company website
- Sustainable Energy and Transportation, April 25, 2006 Texas A&M lecture by Dr. Holtzapple
- The race to 100 mpg, July 2007 article mentioning the StarRotor engine
