= Jeep Grand Cherokee =

Large American 4WD off road sport utility vehicle

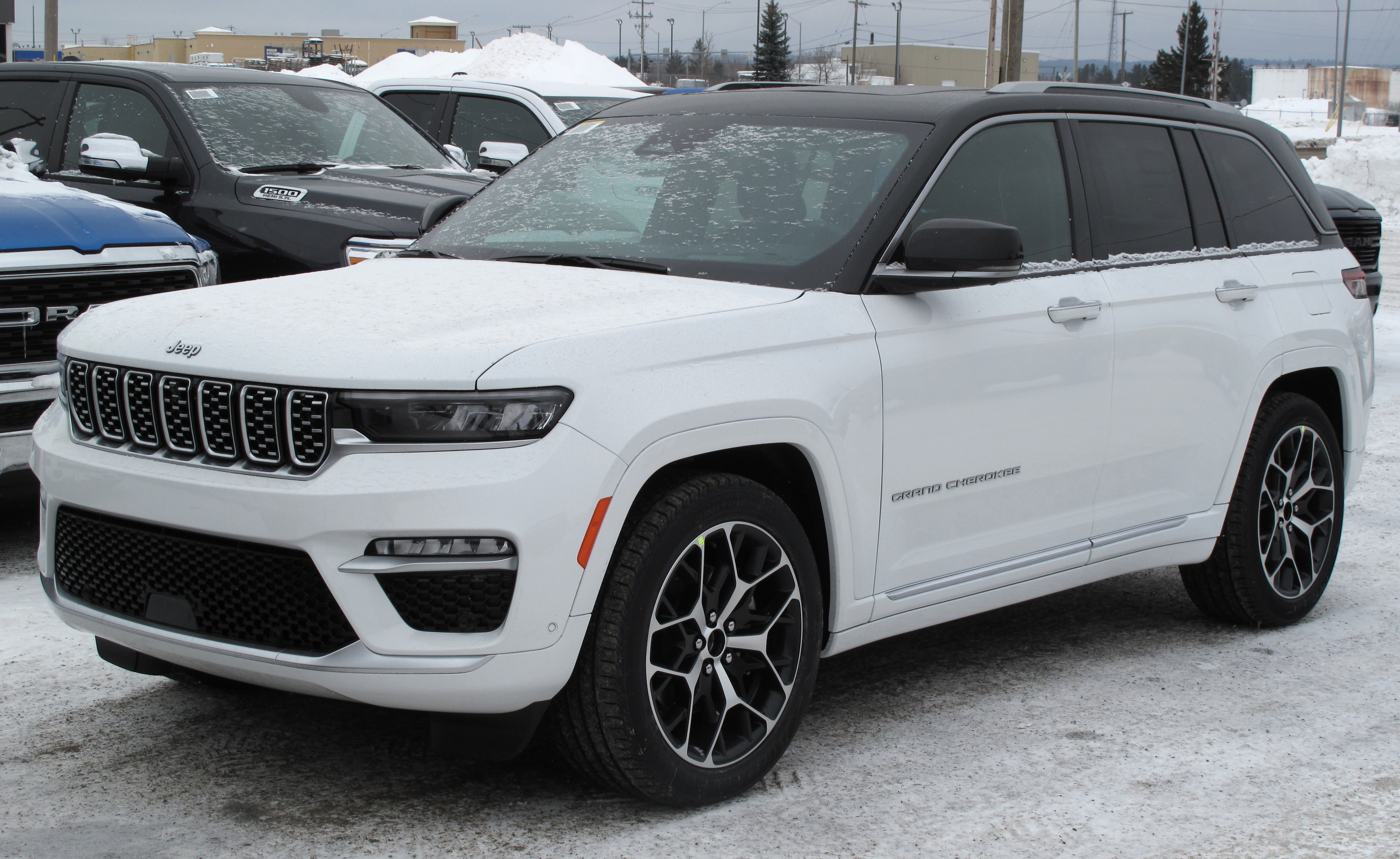

Overview
- Manufacturer: Jeep (Note: Chrysler Corporation (1992–1998); DaimlerChrysler (1998–2007); Chrysler LLC (2007–2009); Chrysler Group LLC (2009–2014); FCA US LLC (2014–2021); Stellantis North America (2021–present))
- Production: 1992–present
- Model years: 1993–present

Body and chassis
- Class: Mid-size SUV (1993–2010); Mid-size crossover SUV (2011–present)
- Body style: 5-door sport utility vehicle
- Layout: Front-engine, rear-wheel-drive; Front-engine, four-wheel-drive
- Chassis: Uniframe

The Jeep Grand Cherokee is a range of mid-sized sport utility vehicles produced by American manufacturer Jeep. It has used a unibody chassis since its introduction in 1992, when most SUVs were still manufactured with body-on-frame construction.

== Development ==
The Grand Cherokee's origins date back to 1983, when American Motors Corporation (AMC) was designing a successor to the Jeep Cherokee. Three outside (non-AMC) designers—Larry Shinoda, Alain Clenet, and Giorgetto Giugiaro—were also under contract with AMC to create and build a clay model of the Cherokee XJ replacement, then known as the "XJC" project. However, the basic design for the Cherokee's replacement was well underway by AMC's in-house designers and the 1989 Jeep Concept 1 show car foretold the basic design.

As AMC began the development of the next Jeep in 1985, management created a business process that is now known as product lifecycle management (PLM). According to François Castaing, vice president for Product Engineering and Development, the smallest U.S. automaker was looking for a way to speed up its product development process to compete better against its larger competitors. The XJC's development was aided by computer-aided design software systems making the engineers more productive. Meanwhile, new communication systems allowed potential conflicts to be resolved faster, thus reducing costly engineering changes, because all drawings and documents were in a central database. The system was so effective that after Chrysler purchased AMC in 1987, it expanded the system throughout its enterprise, thus connecting everyone involved in designing and building products.

The Grand Cherokee thus became the first Chrysler-badged Jeep product. Development work for the new Jeep model continued and Chrysler's employees (after the 1987 buyout of AMC) were eager for a late-1980s release date; however, CEO Lee Iacocca was pushing for redesigned Chrysler minivans, thus delaying the Grand Cherokee's release until late 1992 as an Explorer competitor. Unlike the Explorer, the Grand Cherokee used monocoque (unibody) construction, whereas the Explorer was a derivative of the Ranger pickup with a separate body-on-frame construction. A Dodge-branded version was designed as a precaution should Jeep dealers struggle to handle so many Grand Cherokee units.

The Grand Cherokee debuted in grand fashion at the 1992 North American International Auto Show in Detroit, Michigan. The vehicle that was driven was a Poppy Red Clear Coat 1993 Grand Cherokee ZJ Laredo with a quartz cloth interior and high-back bucket seats. Chrysler's then-president Robert Lutz drove Detroit mayor Coleman Young from the Jefferson North Assembly Plant on North Jefferson Avenue with a police escort to Cobo Hall, up the steps of Cobo Hall, and through a plate-glass window to show off the new vehicle. Sales of the 1993 model year Grand Cherokee began in April 1992.

Production of the Grand Cherokee started shortly afterward in the purpose-built Jefferson North Assembly in Detroit. European Grand Cherokees are manufactured in Austria by Magna Steyr. The Grand Cherokee "played a significant part in reviving Chrysler's fortunes by moving it into the then-nascent market for high-margin sports utility vehicles."

Upon its introduction, it was the first full-scale manufacture of an automobile in the US using HFC-134a refrigerant in place of HCFC-12 for the HVAC system.

== First generation (ZJ; 1993) ==
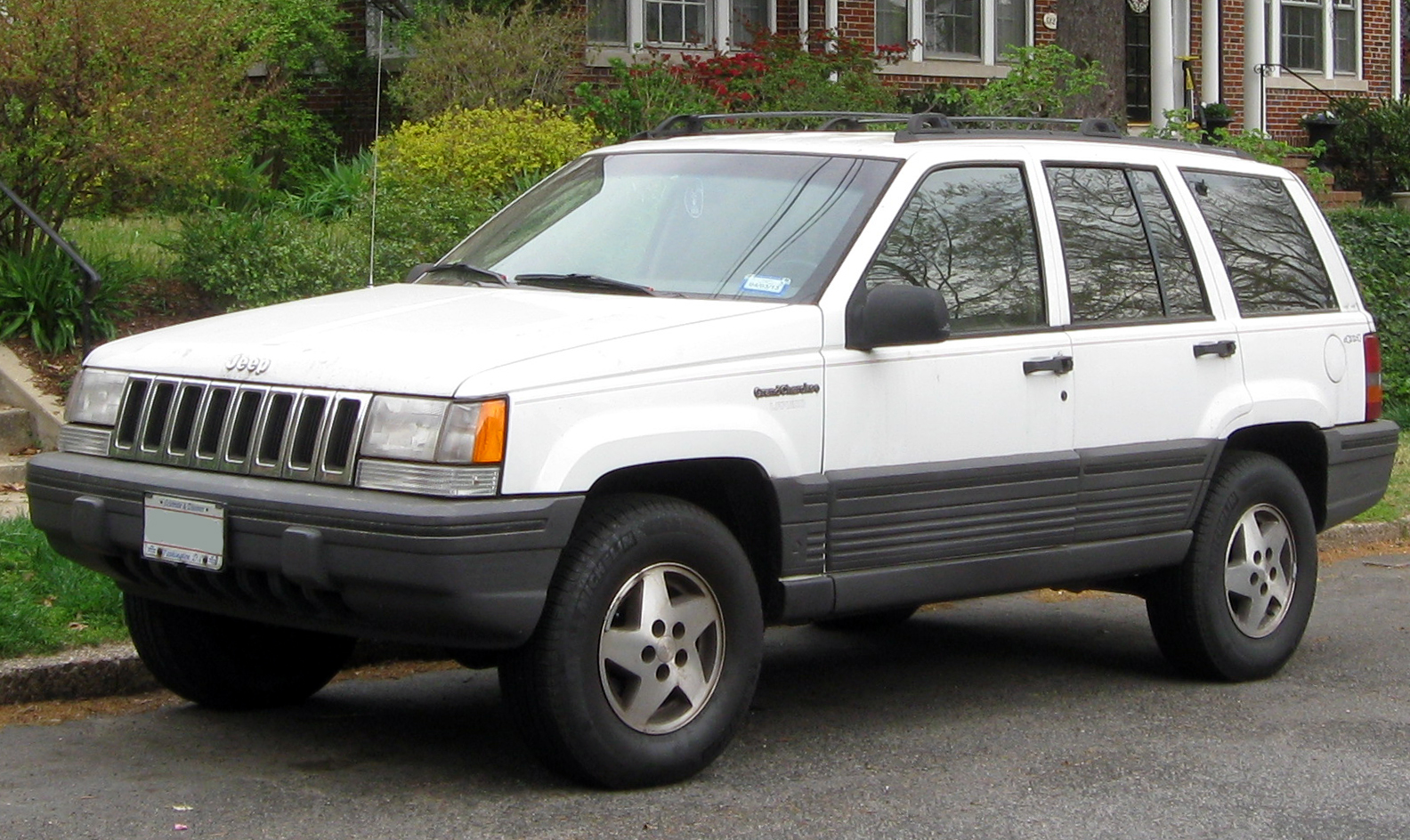
1993–1998 Jeep Grand Cherokee (US)

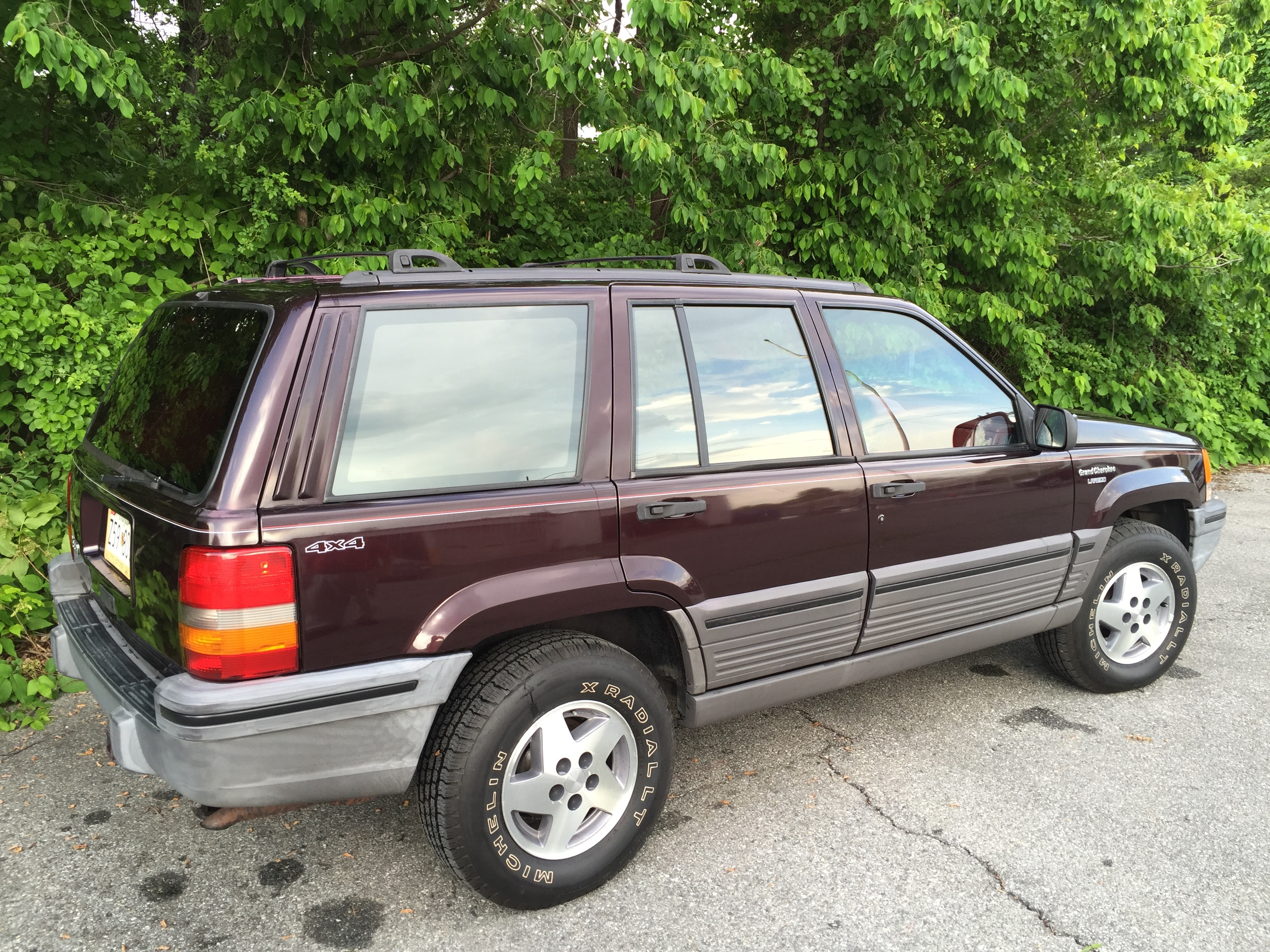
1993 Jeep Grand Cherokee Laredo (USA)

The original Grand Cherokee was launched in 1992 as a 1993 model-year vehicle in the luxury SUV segment. The "ZJ" models, manufactured from 1992 until 1998, originally came in three trim levels - base (also known as SE), Laredo, and Limited; subsequent trims were added, including Orvis (MY 95–98) and TSI (MY97–98). The base model included features such as full instrumentation, a cloth interior, and a standard five-speed manual transmission, while gaining the "SE" moniker for the 1994 model year. Power windows and locks were not standard equipment on the base trim. The minimal price tag differential resulted in low consumer demand, and as a result, the low-line model was eventually discontinued. Additional standard features included a driver-side airbag and a four-wheel antilock braking system (ABS). The Laredo was the mid-scale model with standard features that included power windows, power door locks, cruise control, and a leather-wrapped steering wheel. Exterior features included medium-grey plastic paneling on the lower body and five-spoke alloy wheels. The Limited was the premium model, featuring body-color lower body paneling and gold exterior accents. The Limited also boasted standard features such as leather seating, heated mirrors, front power seats, a keyless entry system, woodgrain interior appliqué, lace-style alloy wheels, a driver information center with a compass, digitized climate control, an electrochromic rearview mirror, and Jensen brand stereo with a multiband equalizer. By 1996, the options list grew to include heated seats. Standard was the 4.0 L engine, with the 5.2 L V8 (and 5.9 L in 1998) being optional, as with other models. Package groups with various trim levels included fog lamps and skid plates, as well as convenience, lighting, luxury, power, security, and trailer-towing packages.

When it was first introduced in April 1992 as an early 1993 model year vehicle, the Grand Cherokee only had one powertrain choice: the 4.0 L AMC-derived straight-six engine that made 190 horsepower (193 PS; 142 kW). This became the "volume" engine for the Grand Cherokee. Transmission choices included a four-speed automatic transmission (early production ZJs used the AW4—the A500SE (later 42RE) replaced the AW4 during the latter half of the 1993 model year) or an Aisin AX15 manual transmission. Low demand for the manual transmission resulted in its discontinuation after 1994, but European-market ZJs retained it when coupled to the diesel engine (which was unavailable in North America). The drive-train choices included rear-wheel drive or four-wheel-drive. In 1995, the engine's rating was reduced by 5 horsepower (5 PS; 4 kW) to 185 horsepower (188 PS; 138 kW) due to new EPA regulations starting with the 1996 model year.

In 1997, for the 1998 model year, a variant of the top-level Grand Cherokee Limited, the "5.9 Limited", was introduced. Jeep ads claimed it to be the "world's fastest sport utility vehicle", verified by third-party testing. The primary improvements in the 5.9 Limited version included a 245-horsepower (248 PS; 183 kW) 5.9 L OHV V8 engine, heavy-duty 46RE automatic transmission, functional heat-extracting hood louvers, unique wide-slot body-colored grille with mesh inserts, special rocker moldings, low-restriction exhaust with three-inch chrome tip, a low-profile roof rack, and special 16-inch Ultra-Star wheels. The 5.9 Limited also received a 150-amp alternator and a two-speed electric cooling fan. Other features included a standard 180-watt, 10-speaker Infinity Gold sound system with a rear roof-mounted soundbar, standard sunroof, and an interior swaddled with unique "calf's nap" soft leather and faux wood trim. The 5.9 Limited was awarded "4×4 of the Year" for 1998 by Petersen's 4-Wheel & Off-Road magazine. The production of this model was 14,286 units.

Export models produced at the plant in Graz, Austria, were given the vehicle designation of "ZG".

=== Engines ===
Years	Engine	Displacement	Power	Torque	Notes
1992–1995	4.0 L Straight-6	242 CID	190 hp (193 PS; 142 kW)	225 lb⋅ft (305 N⋅m; 31 kg⋅m)	
1995–1998	4.0 L Straight-6	242 CID	185 hp (188 PS; 138 kW)	220 lb⋅ft (298 N⋅m; 30 kg⋅m)	new emission standards introduced
1992–1994	5.2 L V8	318 CID	220 hp (223 PS; 164 kW)	285 lb⋅ft (386 N⋅m; 39 kg⋅m)	
1994–1998	5.2 L V8	318 CID	220 hp (223 PS; 164 kW)	300 lb⋅ft (407 N⋅m; 41 kg⋅m)	
1995–1998	2.5 L TURBO DIESEL	VM Motori/Detroit Diesel	115 hp (86 kW; 117 PS)	221 lb⋅ft (300 N⋅m; 31 kg⋅m)	Not Available in North America
1998	5.9 L V8	360 CID	245 hp (248 PS; 183 kW)	345 lb⋅ft (468 N⋅m; 48 kg⋅m)	

=== Production numbers ===
Model	1993	1994	1995	1996	1997	1998	Total
ZJ Grand Cherokee	250,143	257,557	290,132	299,726	277,789	271,841	1,647,188

== Second generation (WJ/WG; 1999) ==
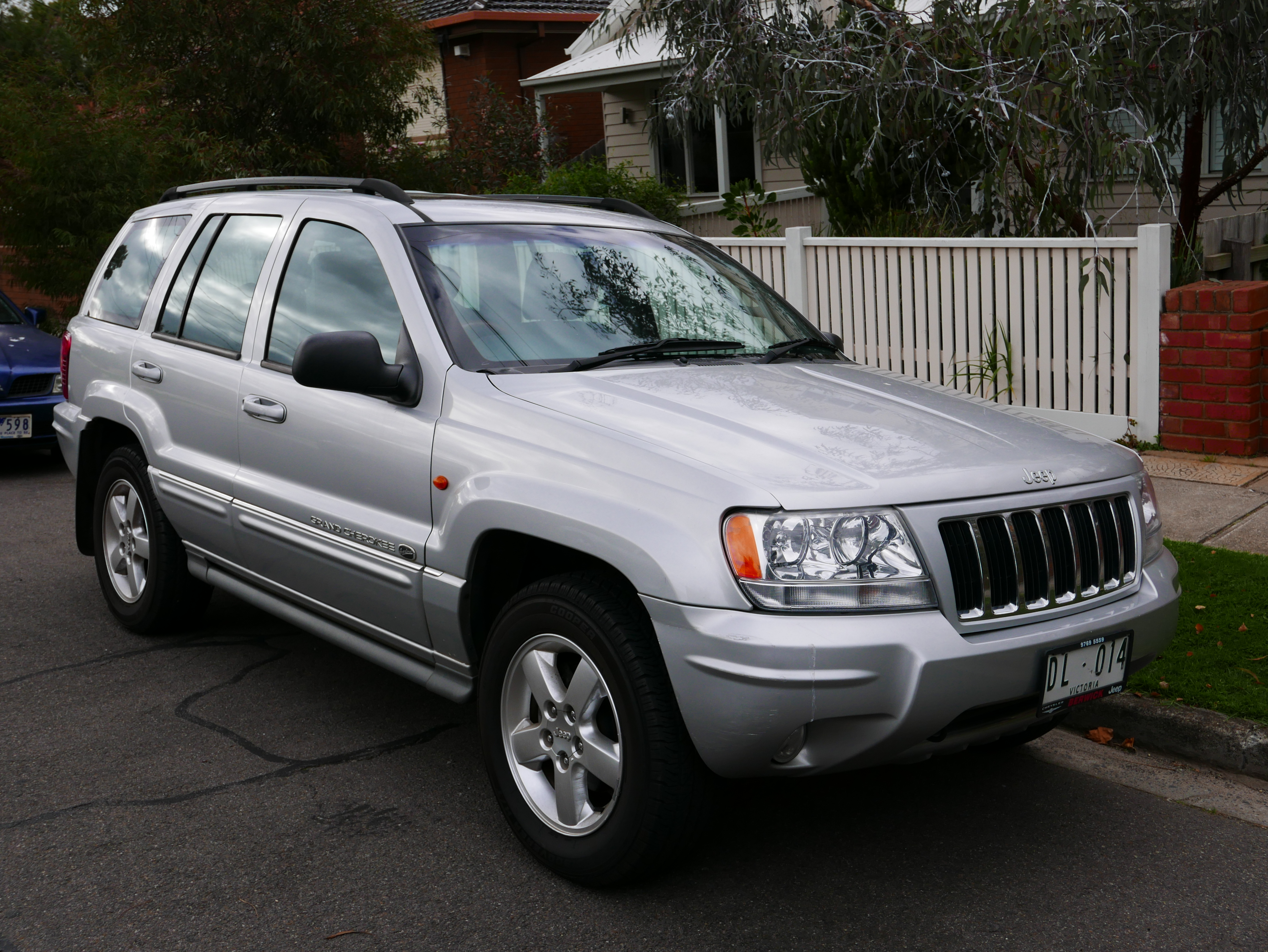

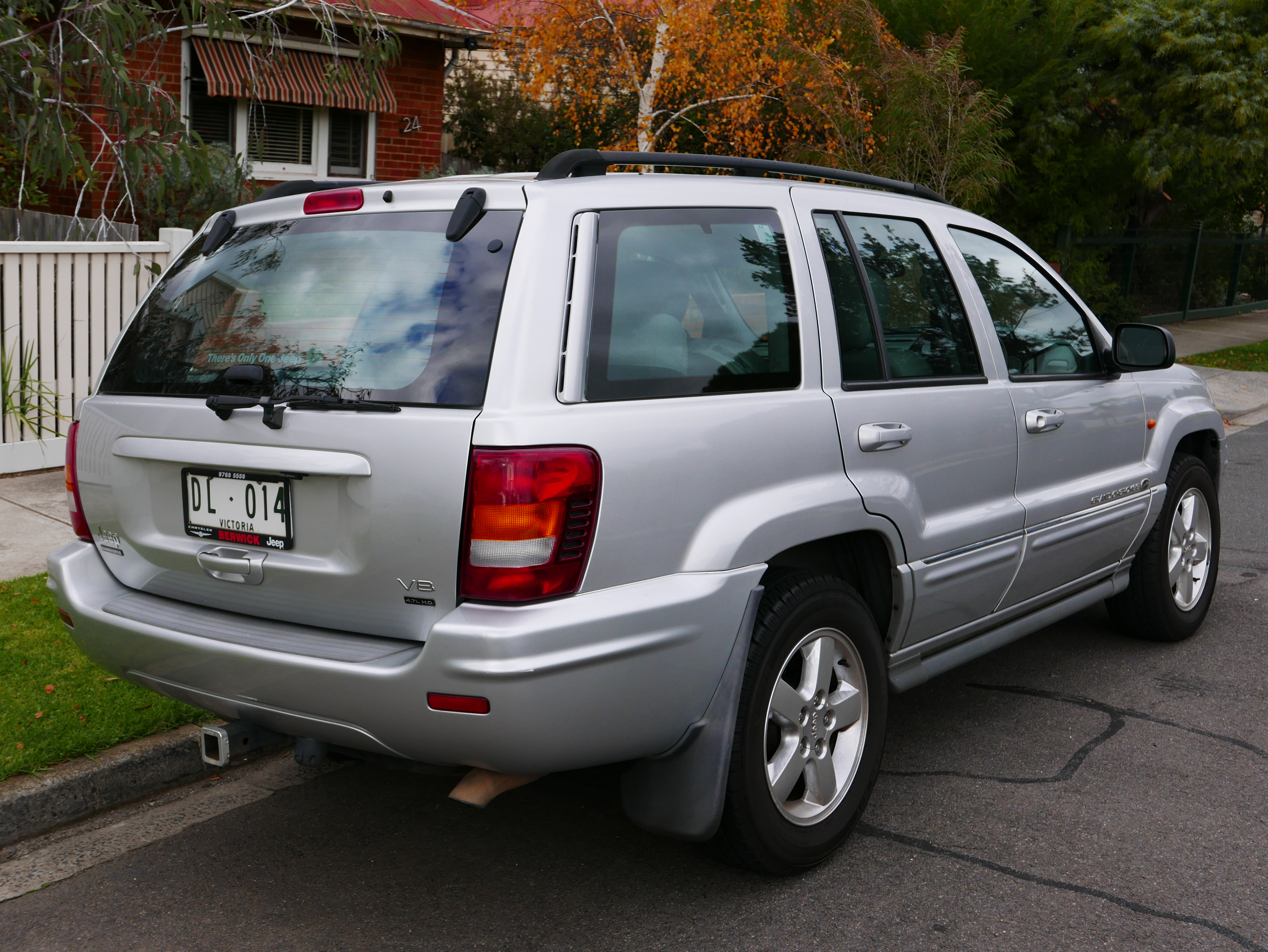
Second generation (WJ) 1999–2004

Launched in September 1998, the redesigned WJ 1999 Grand Cherokee shared just 127 parts with its predecessor (mostly fasteners). The European model was coded WG. The spare tire was relocated from the side of the cargo compartment to under the floor. (Like the 1998MY ZJ, the rear tailgate glass opened separately.) The two heavy pushrod V8 engines were replaced by Chrysler's then-new PowerTech. The new V8 engine produced less torque than the old pushrods, but was lighter, offered better fuel economy, and provided similar on-road performance figures (the 23-US-gallon (87 L; 19 imp gal) fuel tank was replaced with one of a 20.5-US-gallon (78 L; 17.1 imp gal) capacity). The straight-six engine was also updated. A redesign of the intake manifold added 10 horsepower (10 PS; 7 kW). While other Jeep vehicles used the Mopar 5 × 4.5 bolt circle, this was the first Jeep following the 1987 Chrysler buyout to receive a wider bolt pattern—5 × 5.

A notable feature available in this generation was the automatic four-wheel drive option called Quadra-Drive, which employed the New Venture Gear NV247 transfer case. This two-speed chain-driven transfer case uses a gerotor, a clutch pack coupled to a hydraulic pump, to transfer torque between the front and rear axles. The transfer case contains three modes: 4-All Time, Neutral, and 4-Lo. In 4-All Time, 100% of torque is sent to the rear axle in normal conditions. If the rear axle starts spinning at a higher rate than the front axle, hydraulic pressure builds up in the gerotor and causes the clutch pack to progressively transfer torque to the front axle until both axles return to the same speed. A neutral mode is intended for towing the vehicle. In 4-Lo, the front and rear axles are locked together through a 2.72 reduction gear ratio. The NV247 transfer case is mated to front and rear axles containing Jeep's Vari-Lok differentials. Vari-Lok differentials also use a gerotor to transfer torque between the wheels on either side of the axle. The major advantage of Quadra-Drive was that the combined transfer case and progressive locking differentials in each axle could automatically control traction between all four wheels. However, only the center differential could be permanently locked, and only in 4Lo. The Quadra-Trac II system included the NV247 transfer case with the standard open front and rear differentials.

The 45RFE and 545RFE automatic transmission in the WJ was notable. It included three planetary gear sets rather than the two normally used in a four-speed automatic. This gave it six theoretical speeds, and it would have been the first six-speed transmission ever produced in volume, but it was programmed to only use five of these ratios. Four were used for upshifts, with a different second gear for downshifts. Although five of the six ratios were used, Chrysler decided to call it a "4-speed automatic". For MY 2001, the programming was changed to make use of all six ratios. Rather than have six forward gears, the transmission was programmed to act as a five-speed with the alternate second gear for downshifts. The rpm at 70 miles per hour (110 km/h) on a 545RFE is 2,000 rpm, 200 rpm less than the 45RFE programming. 1999 and 2000 model-year WJ owners can have their 45RFE transmission's programming flashed to enable the extra gear as both transmissions are physically the same. (Must purchase new PCM and ABS module and program them with a fake VIN to make this work.) The 42RE 4-speed automatic remained the transmission for the inline 6 engine. It had slight changes from the previous model Grand Cherokee.

The interior was also completely redesigned. The redesign allowed for larger rear doors and more space for rear passengers. Controls for various items like headlights, heated seats, and rear wiper were moved to more convenient locations. The electronic Vehicle Information Center was moved from below the radio to above the windshield and was standard on 2000–2004 models. Limited models included automatic dual-zone climate control. A 10-CD changer was also available with the Infinity Audio package.

In addition to Jeep's UniFrame construction, Daimler Chrysler partnered with Porsche to further strengthen the frame. This was done to reduce Noise Vibration Harshness (NVH). UniFrame is an unusual construction scheme; it incorporates all of the strength and durability of a body-on-frame construction into a unitized construction. By adding stiffness and rigidity to the structure, they enhanced the ride and strengthened the network of steel beams, rails, and pillars (or "safety cage") that surround and protect occupants. More than 70 percent of the underbody is high-strength steel. All Jeep Grand Cherokees feature UniFrame construction.

The Grand Cherokee received a minor facelift for 2004, including round fog lamps, a lower front fascia, and a new body color-matched inset grille design.

Export models produced at the plant in Graz, Austria, were given the vehicle designation of "WG".

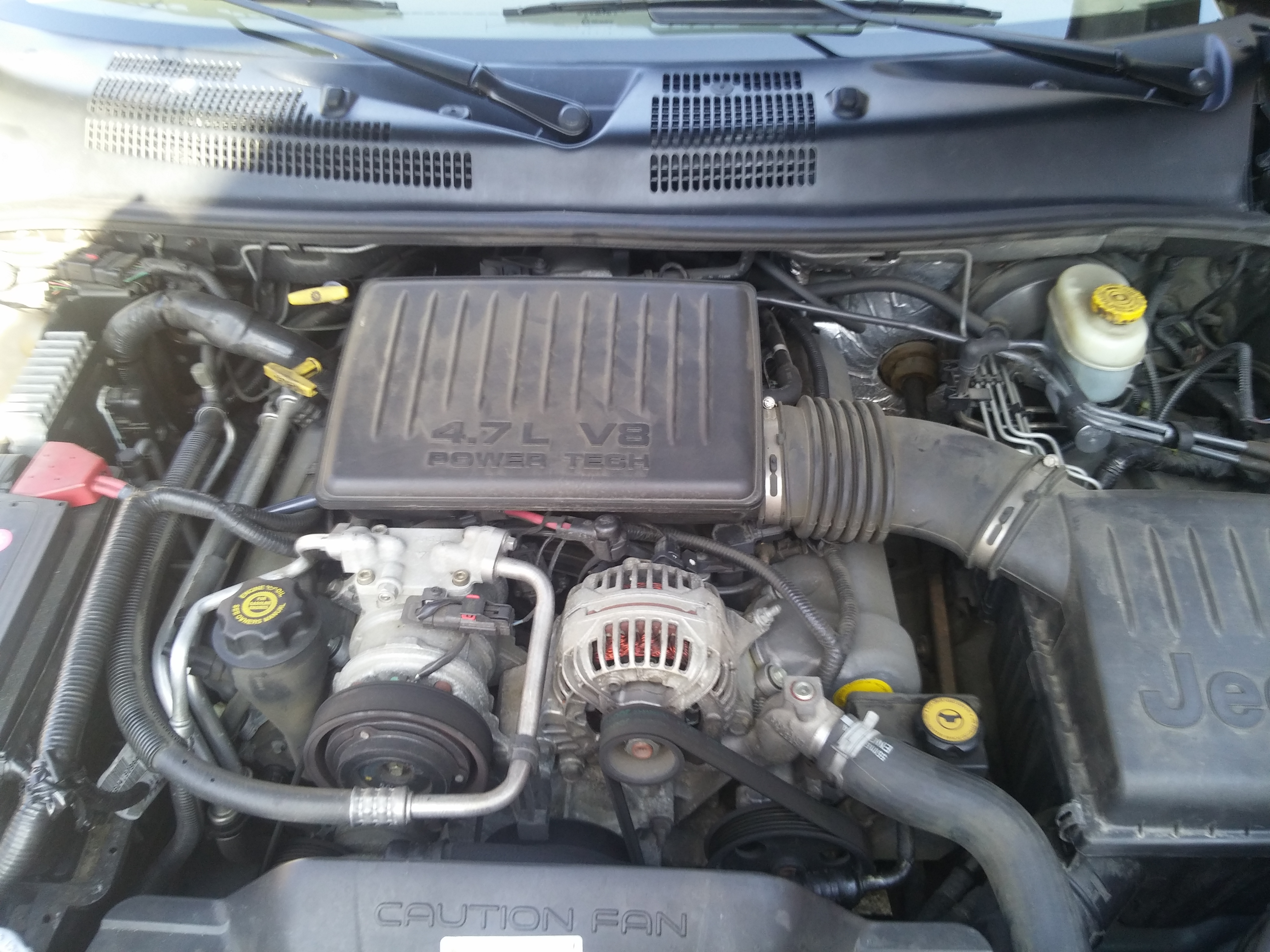
4.7 Powertech engine Jeep WJ

=== Engines ===
Model years	Engine	Displacement	Power	Torque	Notes
1999–2002	3.1 L turbodiesel straight-5	3.1 liters (189 CID)	140 hp (142 PS; 104 kW)	271 lb⋅ft (367 N⋅m; 37 kg⋅m)	Not available in North America, manufactured by VM Motori
1999–2004 (1999–2005 outside North America)	4.0 L straight-6	4.0 liters (242 CID)	195 hp (198 PS; 145 kW)	230 lb⋅ft (312 N⋅m; 32 kg⋅m)	
1999–2004 (1999–2005 outside North America)	4.7 L V8	4.7 liters (287 CID)	235 hp (238 PS; 175 kW)	295 lb⋅ft (400 N⋅m; 41 kg⋅m)	
2002–2005	2.7 L CRD diesel straight-5	2.7 liters (165 CID)	163 hp (165 PS; 122 kW)	295 lb⋅ft (400 N⋅m; 41 kg⋅m)	Not available in North America, manufactured by Mercedes-Benz
2002–2004 (2002–2005 outside North America)	4.7 L "High Output" V8	4.7 liters (287 CID)	265 hp (269 PS; 198 kW)	325 lb⋅ft (441 N⋅m; 45 kg⋅m)	

== Third generation (WK; 2005) ==
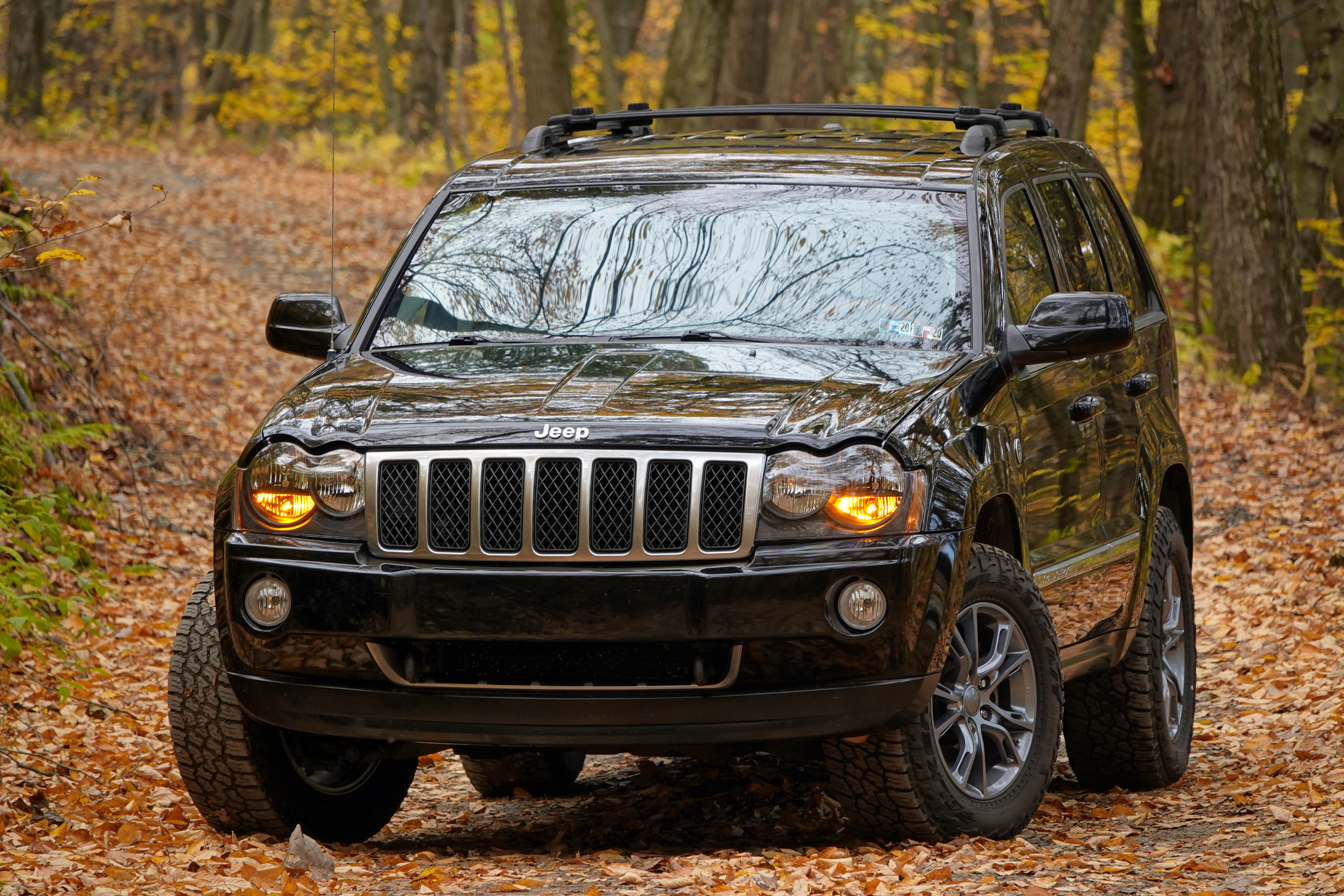
2007 Grand Cherokee Overland

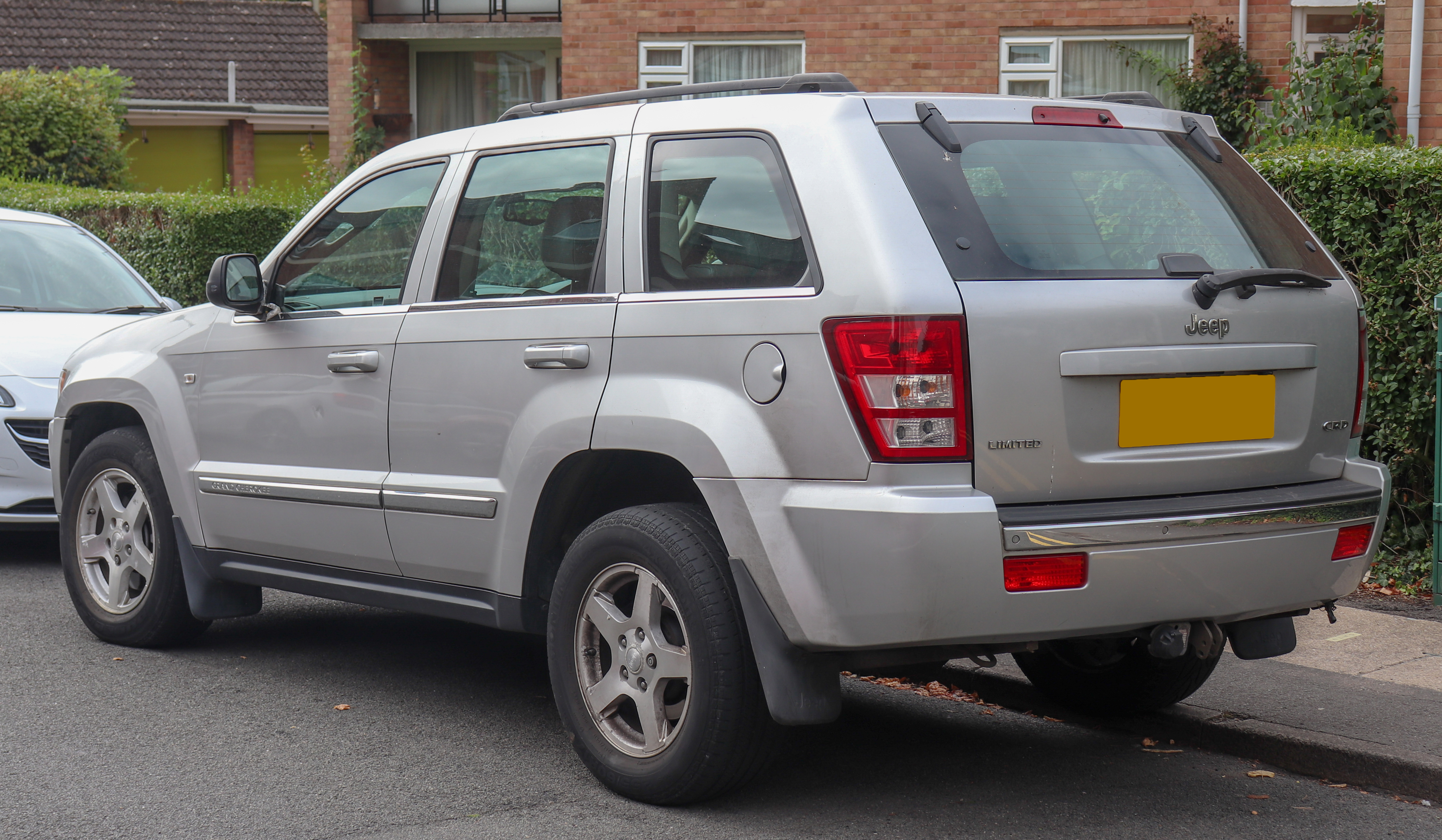
2006 Jeep Grand Cherokee (UK)

The WK Grand Cherokee debuted in 2004 for the 2005 model year at the 2004 New York International Auto Show with available Quadra-Drive II four-wheel drive, rear-seat DVD player and optional 5.7 L Hemi V8. The 3.7 L V6 engine replaced the 4.0 L straight-6. A Mercedes-Benz-sourced 3.0 L V6 Common Rail Diesel (CRD) was available outside of North America from launch.

Jeep replaced the XJ-era leading-arms live-axle front suspension (found in the ZJ and WJ) with an independent double-wishbone setup like that which debuted in the 2002 Liberty. Classed as a truck-based SUV, the WH/WK Grand Cherokee offers "crossover" refinement, capability, and NVH.

The 2007 Jeep Grand Cherokee made its European debut at the Euro Camp Jeep in Ardèche, France. This Jeep has gained 4 stars in the Euro NCAP crash safety tests conducted in 2005.

The Grand Cherokee received a minor facelift for 2008 with revised headlights and available High-Intensity Discharge (HID) Headlamps with auto-leveling. The lower portion of the front bumper was still removable, as it was from launch, to increase the approach angle for off-road use. The 4.7 L was refined, now producing 305 hp (227 kW; 309 PS), and 334 lb⋅ft (453 N⋅m; 46 kg⋅m).

The 2009 Jeep Grand Cherokee is available with an improved 5.7 L Hemi engine rated at 357 hp (362 PS; 266 kW) and 389 lb⋅ft (527 N⋅m; 53.8 kg⋅m) of torque. The engine uses variable valve timing to increase fuel economy.

=== Engines ===
Years	Engine	Displacement	Power	Torque	Notes
2005–2010	3.7 L V6	225 CID (3,687 cc)	215 hp (218 PS; 160 kW)	235 lb⋅ft (319 N⋅m; 32 kg⋅m)	Base, Laredo, Laredo X, Limited
2005–2007	4.7 L V8	287 CID (4,698 cc)	230 hp (233 PS; 172 kW)	295 lb⋅ft (400 N⋅m; 41 kg⋅m)	Laredo, Laredo X, Limited
2008–2009	4.7 L V8	287 CID (4,698 cc)	305 hp (309 PS; 227 kW)	334 lb⋅ft (453 N⋅m; 46 kg⋅m)	Laredo, Laredo X, Limited
2005–2008	5.7 L Hemi V8	345 CID (5,654 cc)	325 hp (330 PS; 242 kW)	369 lb⋅ft (500 N⋅m; 51 kg⋅m)	Laredo X, Limited, Overland
2009–2010	5.7 L Hemi V8	345 CID (5,654 cc)	357 hp (362 PS; 266 kW)	389 lb⋅ft (527 N⋅m; 54 kg⋅m)	Laredo X, Limited, Overland
2006–2010	6.1 L Hemi V8	370 CID (6,059 cc)	420 hp (426 PS; 313 kW)	420 lb⋅ft (569 N⋅m; 58 kg⋅m)	SRT8
2005–2010 Europe/ 2007–2009 North America	3.0 L Mercedes-Benz OM642 V6	182 CID (2,988 cc)	215 hp (218 PS; 160 kW)	376 lb⋅ft (510 N⋅m; 52.0 kg⋅m)	CRD, Predator, Model S, Laredo X, Limited, Overland

== Fourth generation (WK2; 2011) ==
Fourth-generation Jeep Grand Cherokee (WK2)
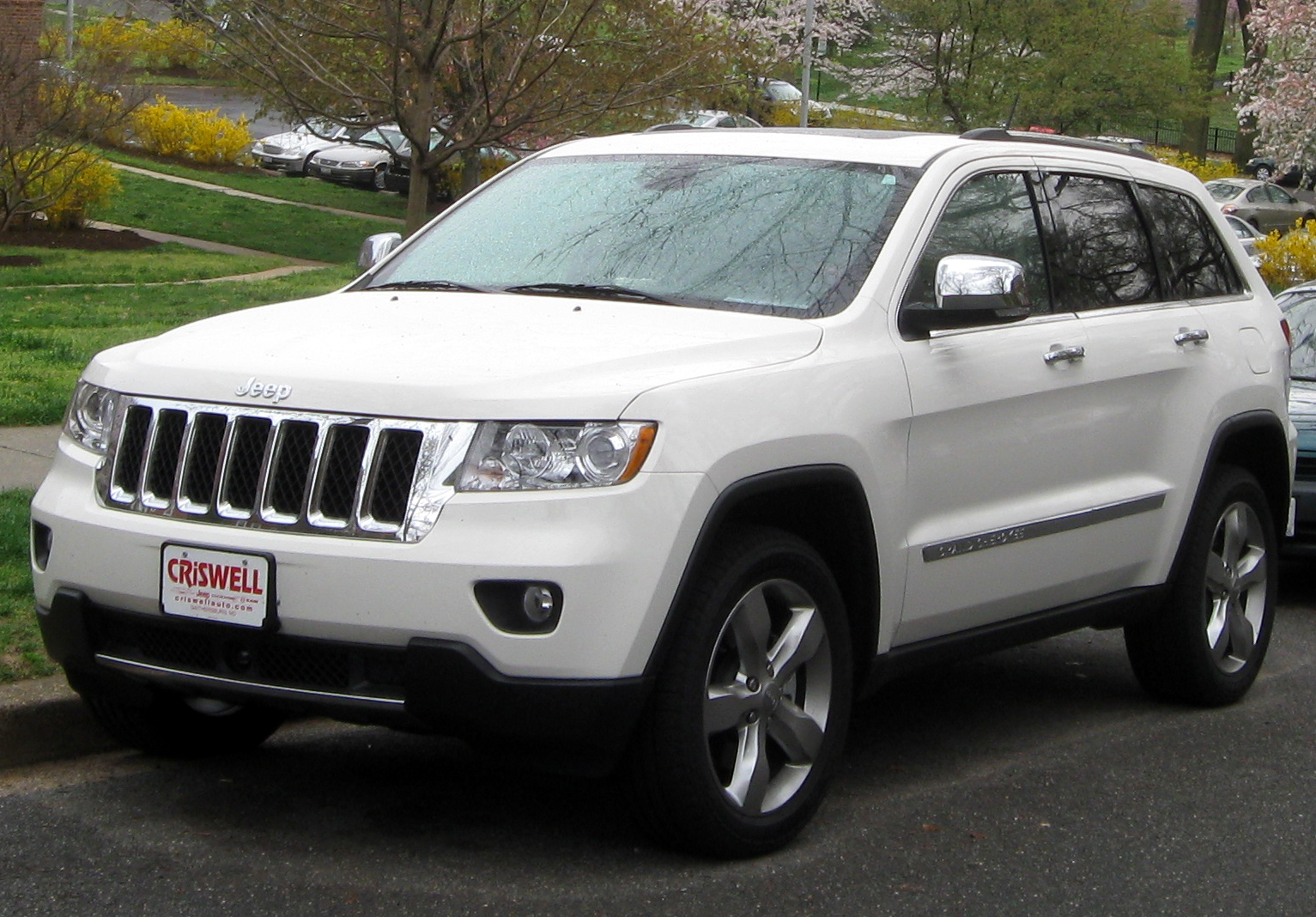

Overview
- Manufacturer: Jeep (Note: Chrysler Group LLC (2010–2014); FCA US LLC (2014–2021); Stellantis North America (2021-2022))
- Also called: Jeep Grand Cherokee WK (2022)
- Production: May 2010–2022
- Model years: 2011–2022
- Assembly: United States: Detroit, Michigan; Mexico: Toluca (German Shields for FCA Mexico) (armor modifications only for Mexican market Grand Cherokee Armored model); Venezuela: Valencia, Carabobo (Carabobo Assembly); Egypt: Cairo (AAV)
- Designer: Mark Allen

Body and chassis
- Class: Mid-size SUV
- Layout: Front-engine, rear-wheel-drive or four-wheel-drive
- Related: Dodge Durango (WD)

Powertrain
- Engine: Gasoline: 3.0 L Pentastar V6 (China); 3.6 L Pentastar V6; 5.7 L Hemi V8; 6.2 L supercharged Hellcat Hemi V8 (Trackhawk); 6.4 L Hemi V8 (SRT); Diesel: 3.0 L VM Motori A 630 DOHC V6
- Transmission: 5-speed automatic W5A580; 5-speed automatic 545RFE; 6-speed automatic 65RFE; 8-speed automatic 845RE; 8-speed automatic 850RE; 8-speed automatic 8HP70

Dimensions
- Wheelbase: 114.8 in (2,915 mm)
- Length: 189.8 in (4,821 mm)
- Width: 76.3 in (1,938 mm)
- Height: 69.3 in (1,760 mm)
- Curb weight: 4,533 lb (2,056 kg) (V6 RWD); 5,264 lb (2,388 kg) (V8 4WD)

Chronology
- Predecessor: Jeep Grand Cherokee (WK)
- Successor: Jeep Grand Cherokee (WL)

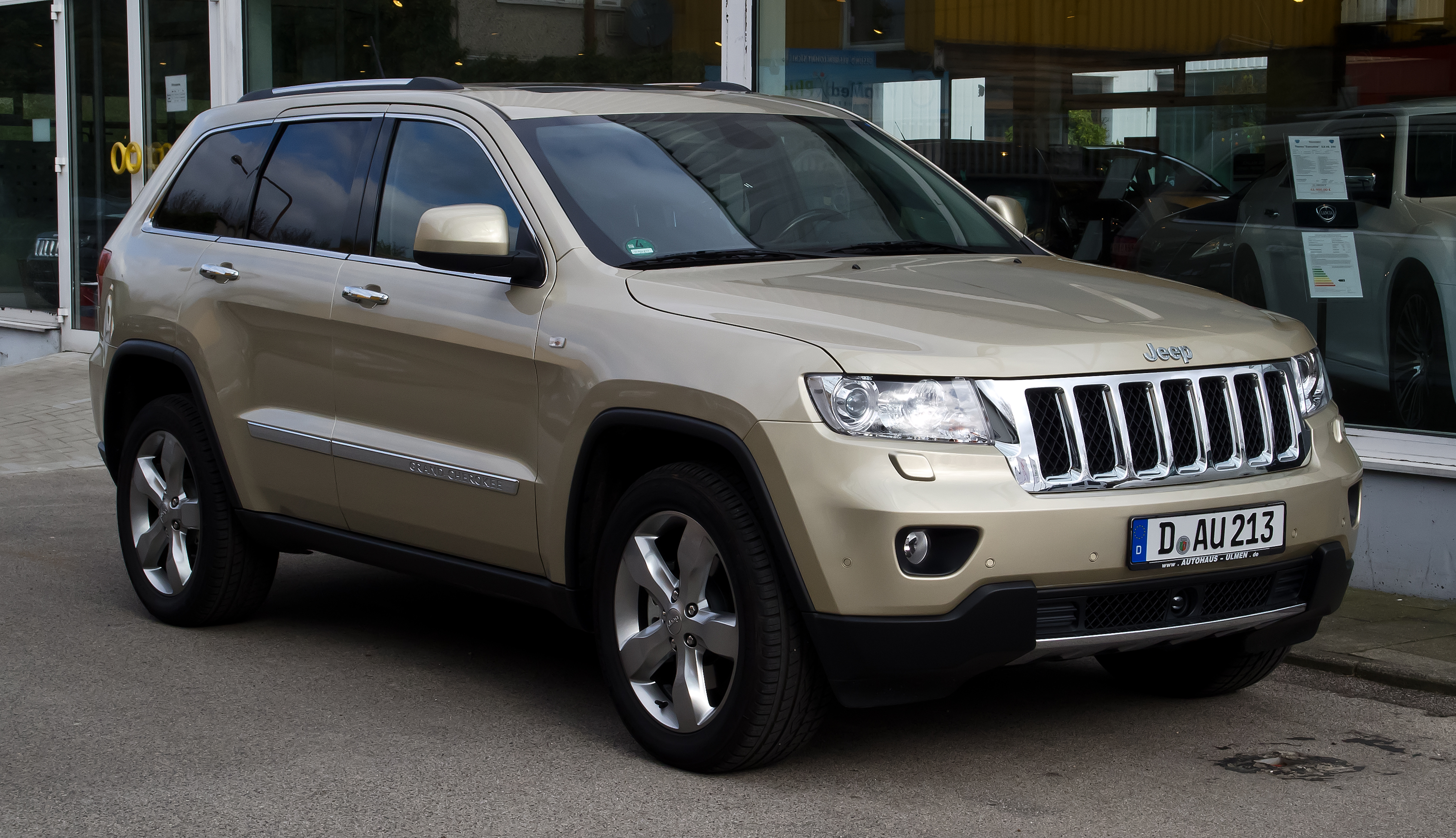

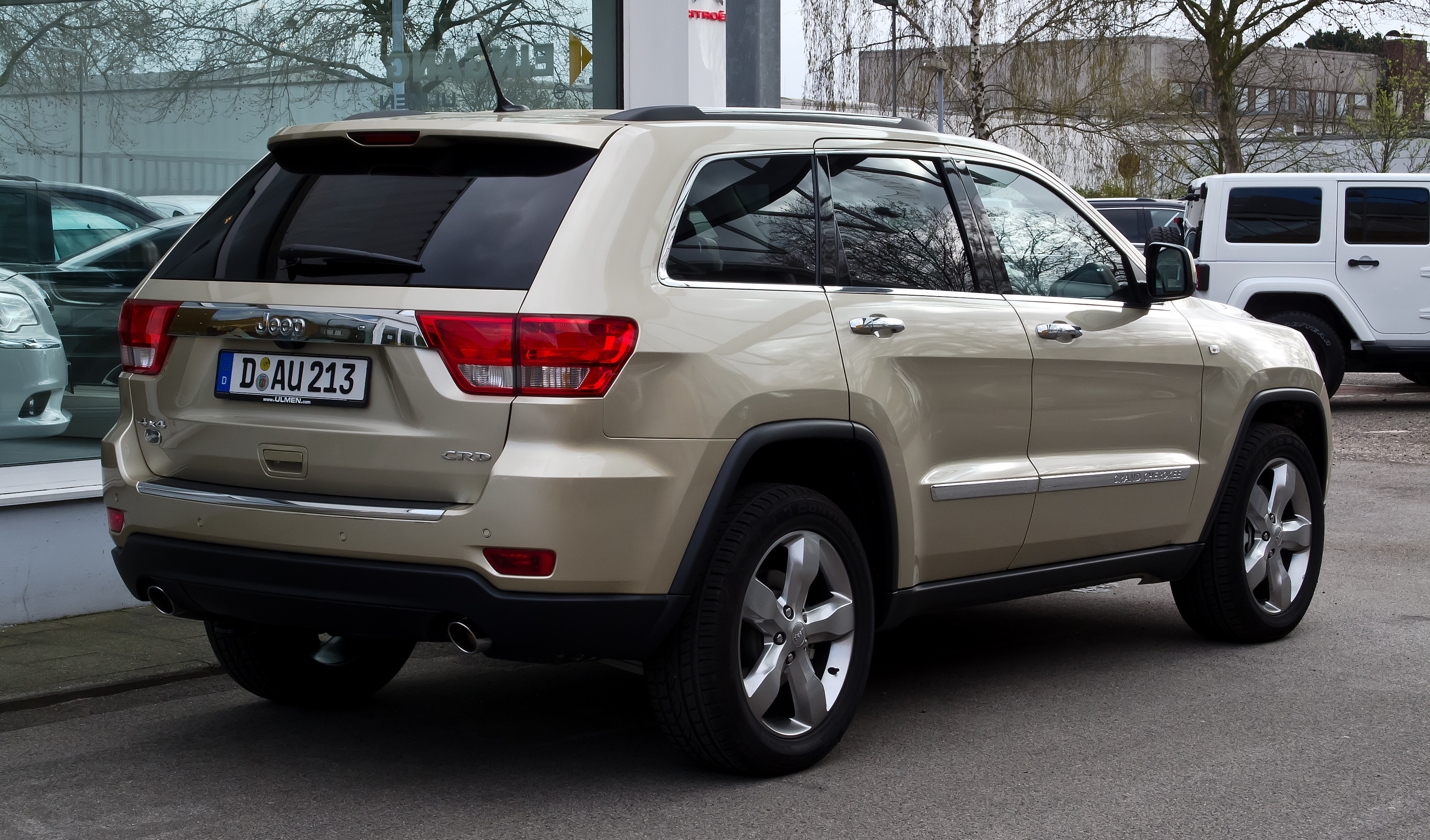
2012 Jeep Grand Cherokee Overland

The fourth-generation WK2 Grand Cherokee went on sale in summer 2010 as a 2011 model. It was unveiled at the 2009 New York Auto Show. In 2009, during its development, Chrysler management used it as an example of future products to convince United States, federal regulators of Chrysler's future viability, for the purpose of requesting a federal loan. This culminated in the Chrysler Chapter 11 reorganization that same year.

Like previous generations, the WK2 Grand Cherokee chassis is a steel unibody. Unlike previous generations, it features four-wheel independent suspension for better on-road handling. The WK2 and 2011 Durango use a Chrysler-designed and engineered platform/chassis that Mercedes-Benz later used for the Mercedes-Benz W166 series. The Chrysler-designed platform was part of the DaimlerChrysler engineering projects that were to launch the WK2 Grand Cherokee, with the Mercedes-Benz ML to follow.

Engine choices include the all-new 3.6 L Pentastar V6 and 5.7 L Hemi V8. The Hemi V8 retains the Multiple Displacement System (MDS) that shuts down four cylinders in low-power driving situations. The V8 included a multi-speed automatic transmission featuring Electronic Range Selection (ERS) to manually limit the high gear operating range. Trailer towing is rated 7,400 pounds (3,357 kg) for Hemi models and 6,800 pounds (3,084 kg) for Pentastar models. A 3.0 L turbocharged diesel V6 developed and built by Fiat Powertrain Technologies and VM Motori (with Multijet II injection) rated at 177 kW (241 PS; 237 hp) and 550 N⋅m (406 lb⋅ft; 56 kg⋅m) of torque offered in export markets from mid-2011. The new 3.0 L CRD turbodiesel engine is available in European markets as 140 kW (190 PS; 188 hp) low-power version.

The Grand Cherokee SRT8, which started production on July 16, 2011, is equipped with a 470-horsepower (350 kW; 477 PS) 6.4 L Hemi V8 engine. Jeep claims the new SRT8 gets 13 percent better fuel economy than its predecessor.

For the 2022 model year, Jeep marketed the outgoing Grand Cherokee WK2 alongside the all-new Grand Cherokee WL model as the Grand Cherokee WK (not to be confused with the Grand Cherokee (WK), which was produced from 2005 until 2010). The lineup is condensed to base Laredo "E", mid-level Laredo "X", and range-topping Limited trims, with the only engine option being the base 3.6 L Pentastar V6 gasoline engine.

=== Engines ===
Years	Engine	Displacement	Power	Torque	Notes
2011–2022	3.6 L Pentastar V6	220 CID (3,604 cc)	295 hp (299 PS; 220 kW)	260 lb⋅ft (353 N⋅m; 36 kg⋅m)	Laredo, Laredo E, Laredo X, Altitude, Limited, Sterling Edition, Trailhawk, Overland, High Altitude, Summit
2011–2021	5.7 L Hemi V8	345 CID (5,654 cc)	360 hp (365 PS; 268 kW)	390 lb⋅ft (529 N⋅m; 54 kg⋅m)	Laredo X (up to 2013), Altitude (up to 2013), Limited, Sterling Edition, Trailhawk, Overland, High Altitude, Summit
2012–2021	6.4 L Hemi V8	392 CID (6,417 cc)	470 hp (477 PS; 350 kW)	470 lb⋅ft (637 N⋅m; 65 kg⋅m)	SRT8, SRT
2018–2021	6.2 L supercharged Hemi V8	376 CID (6,166 cc)	707 hp (717 PS; 527 kW)	645 lb⋅ft (875 N⋅m; 89 kg⋅m)	Trackhawk
2011–2018	3.0 L CRD V6	182 CID (2,988 cc)	140 kW (190 PS; 188 hp)	440 N⋅m (325 lb⋅ft; 45 kg⋅m)	US-spec lower output to meet emission standards
2014–2020	3.0 L CRD V6	182 CID (2,988 cc)	179 kW (243 PS; 240 hp)	569 N⋅m (420 lb⋅ft; 58 kg⋅m)	Available outside North America from launch. US-spec Limited, Overland, Summit

== Fifth generation (WL; 2021) ==
Fifth generation
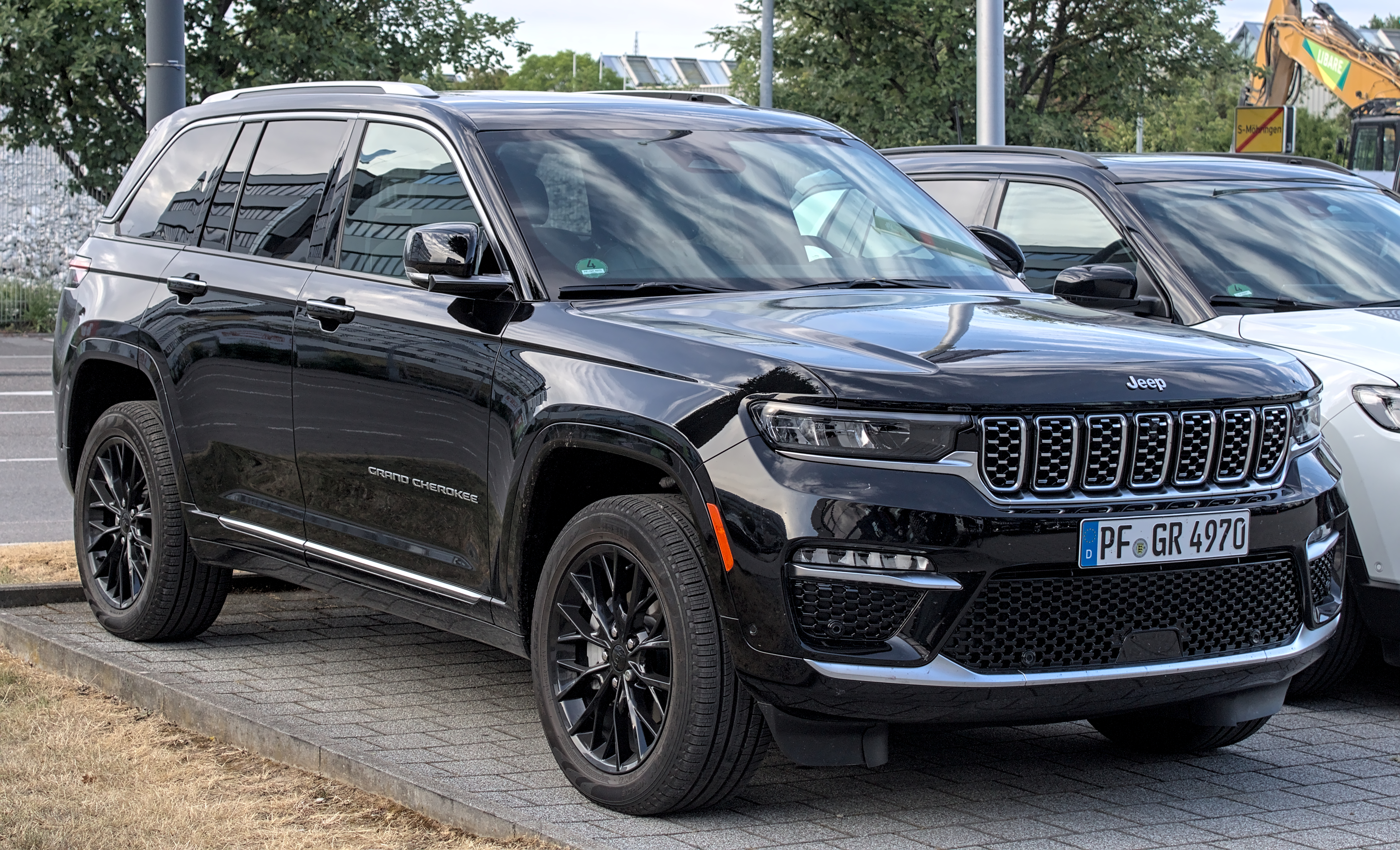
- 2022 Jeep Grand Cherokee (WL)

Overview
- Model code: WL74; WL75 (Grand Cherokee L)
- Production: 2021–present
- Model years: 2021–present (Grand Cherokee L); 2022–present (Grand Cherokee)
- Assembly: United States: Detroit, Michigan (Jefferson North Assembly Plant, Grand Cherokee); (Mack Avenue Assembly Complex; Grand Cherokee L); India: Ranjangaon, Maharashtra (FIAPL); Egypt: Cairo (AAV)
- Designer: Ralph Gilles

Body and chassis
- Class: Mid-size crossover SUV
- Platform: WL platform
- Related: Maserati Grecale, Alfa Romeo Stelvio

Powertrain
- Engine: Gasoline: 2.0 L Hurricane 4 EVO turbo I4 (gasoline) (2026–); 3.0 L Hurricane twin-turbo I6 (2028–); 3.6 L Pentastar V6 (eTorque); 5.7 L Hemi V8 (2021-2023); 2.0 L GME-T4 T I4 (export) (2021-2025); Gasoline plug-in hybrid: 2.0 L GME turbo I4 (4xe, 2022–2025)
- Electric motor: Rear 33 kW (44 hp; 45 PS) FCA IPMSM and 100 kW (134 hp; 136 PS) integrated transmission-traction motor (4xe)
- Transmission: 8-speed Torqueflite 850RE automatic
- Hybrid drivetrain: PHEV (4xe) MHEV (eTorque)
- Battery: 17.3 kWh, 400 V, 96-cell Li-ion, nickel manganese cobalt battery (LiNiMnCoO2; PHEV)

Dimensions
- Wheelbase: 116.7 in (2,964 mm) (SWB); 121.7 in (3,091 mm) (LWB)
- Length: 193.5 in (4,915 mm) (SWB); 204.9 in (5,204 mm) (LWB)
- Width: 77.9 in (1,979 mm)
- Height: 71.5 in (1,816 mm)
- Curb weight: 4,513–5,558 lb (2,047–2,521 kg) (SWB); 4,618–5,353 lb (2,095–2,428 kg) (LWB)

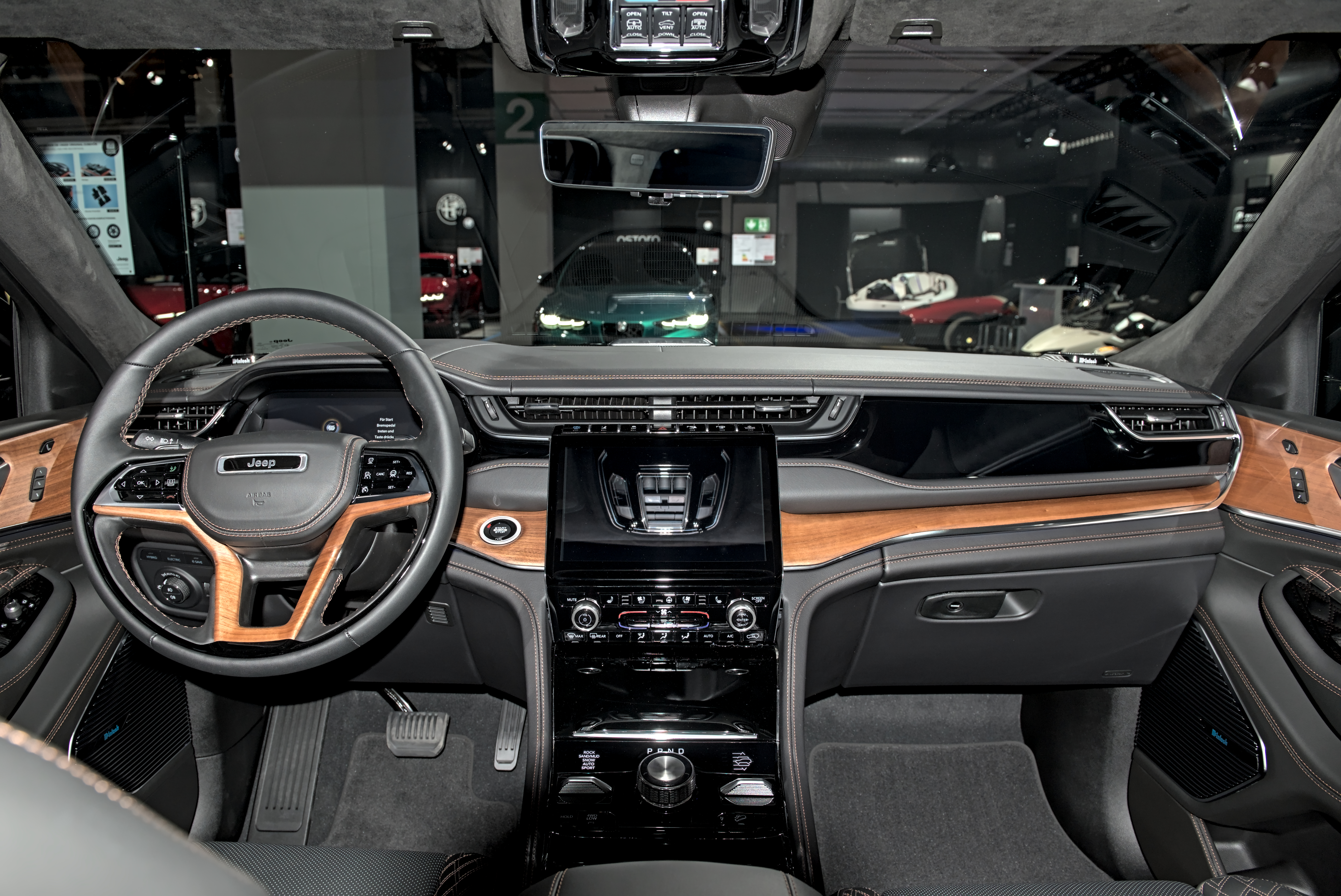
Interior (4xe)

The fifth-generation (WL) Grand Cherokee was revealed as the three-row LWB version, Grand Cherokee L on January 7, 2021. The two-row version was revealed on September 30, 2021. The Grand Cherokee L is assembled at the new Mack Avenue Assembly Complex, which is built on the grounds of the Mack Avenue Engine Complex in Detroit, Michigan. The two-row Grand Cherokee will continue to be assembled at the nearby Jefferson North Assembly Plant, where it has been assembled since its introduction in 1992 for the 1993 model year.

Three different four-wheel-drive systems will be available: Quadra-Trac I, Quadra-Trac II featuring low range, and Quadra Trac II with Electronic Limited Slip Differential (ELSD) also known as Quadra-Drive II with low range and "Quadra Lift" air suspension system, as well as rear-wheel drive. When properly equipped, the Grand Cherokee will be able to tow up to 7,200 pounds (3,300 kg). The Grand Cherokee will also be able to ford up to two feet (24 in) of water (when equipped with the Quadra Lift air suspension system). All engines will be mated to a ZF-sourced eight-speed automatic transmission that is controlled via a rotary shift knob. The Selec Terrain system, first introduced on the Jeep Grand Cherokee (WK2), will also be available on the Grand Cherokee WL, and is now controlled via a toggle switch in the center console.

The 2021 Grand Cherokee is the third Fiat Chrysler Automobiles product to offer the new UConnect 5 infotainment suite, which will offer either an 8.4-inch or 10.1-inch high-resolution touchscreen display, SiriusXM Satellite Radio with 360L, SiriusXM Travel Link services, UConnect Guardian (powered by SiriusXM), a 4G LTE wireless Internet hotspot, wireless Apple CarPlay and Android Auto smartphone integration, and an integrated virtual assistant that can be activated by the phrase, "Hey UConnect", or "Hey Jeep", and can control multiple features of the vehicle, as well as provide other pertinent information.

=== Grand Cherokee L ===
The Grand Cherokee L went on sale in June 2021. Its wheelbase is 6.9 inches (175 mm) longer than the previous generation two-row model, and 5 inches (127 mm) longer than its two-row counterpart. It is equipped with an independent front and multi-link rear suspension. It arrived in Mexico in September 2021, offered only in the Summit Reserve 4X4 trim.

The Grand Cherokee L is available in five trim levels: Laredo (and Laredo X), Altitude (and Altitude X), Limited, Overland, and Summit (and Summit Reserve). While all models include a 3.6 L Pentastar V6 gasoline engine producing 290 hp (294 PS; 216 kW) and 257 lb⋅ft (348 N⋅m; 36 kg⋅m) (now assisted by the eTorque Mild Hybrid system), Overland and Summit models will also offer the 5.7 L Hemi V8 gasoline engine with Multi Displacement System (MDS) rated at 357 hp (362 PS; 266 kW) and 390 lb⋅ft (529 N⋅m; 54 kg⋅m) of torque.

For the first time, the Grand Cherokee will offer a 950-watt, nineteen-speaker McIntosh premium amplified surround sound audio system, replacing the previous 825-watt, eighteen-speaker Harman Kardon system on the Grand Cherokee WK2. Other new features available for the first time on a Grand Cherokee include massaging front seats, a rear seat view camera, a surround-view (360-degree) camera system, an inside fam cam for viewing different seats, a rearview camera digital mirror, wireless Apple CarPlay and Android Auto smartphone integration, Qi-compatible wireless device charging, a passenger side screen with HDMI interface, heated and ventilated second-row seats, second-row captain's chairs, twenty-one inch tires and wheels, Level 2 semi-autonomous driving technology, and power-folding second and third-row seats.

For 2021, the Grand Cherokee L, along with the all-new 2022 two-row Grand Cherokee, received the front passenger interactive touchscreen display, which was first introduced on the Wagoneer and Grand Wagoneer. Integrated into the woodgrain trim on the passenger side of the dashboard, the widescreen display with HDMI interface allows the passenger to stream music wirelessly via Bluetooth to the vehicle's audio system, view the GPS navigation map, and send destinations directly to the central touchscreen display's navigation system. The display features a special coating that allows only the front passenger to view it while the vehicle is in motion.

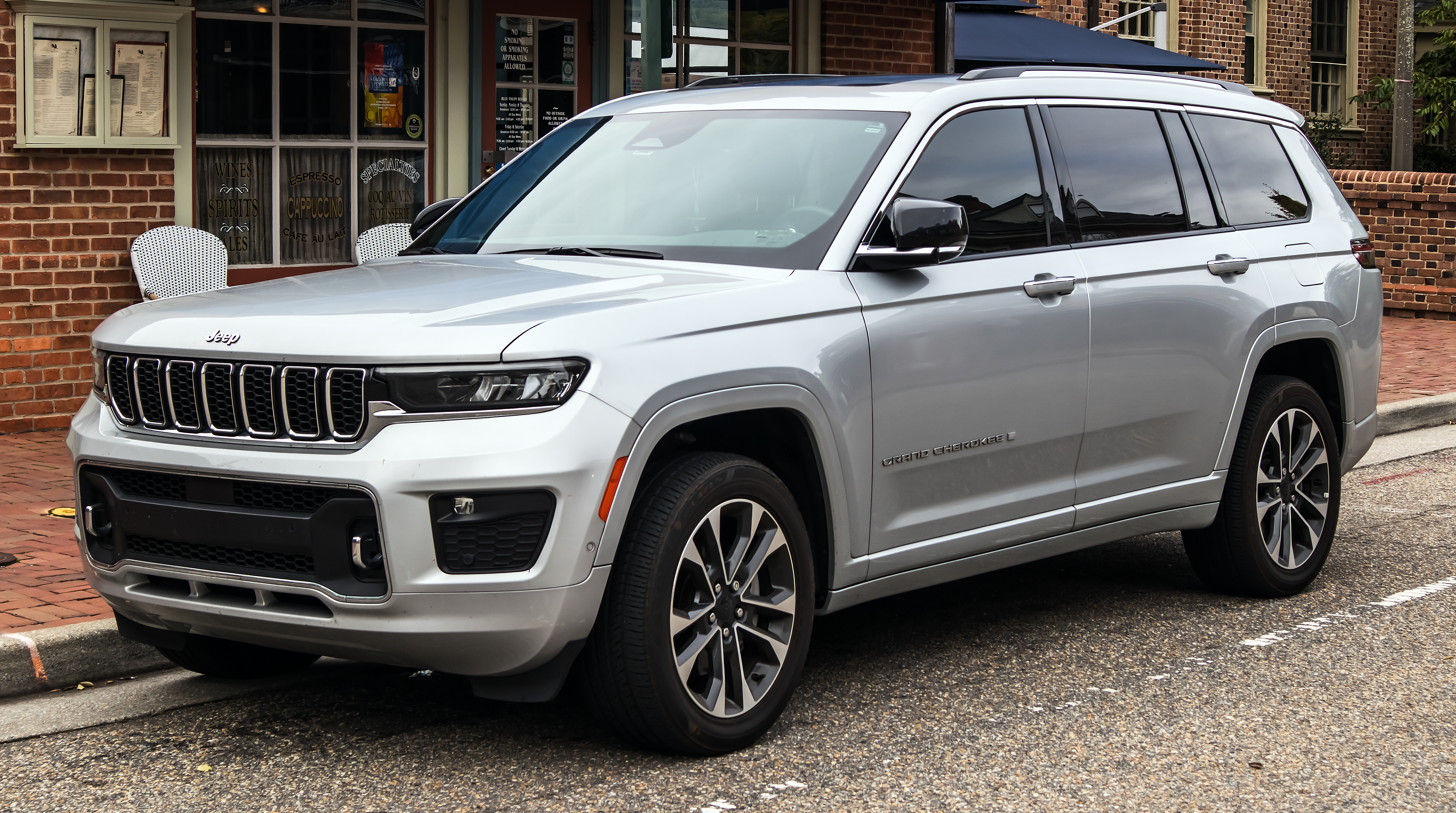
Grand Cherokee L Overland

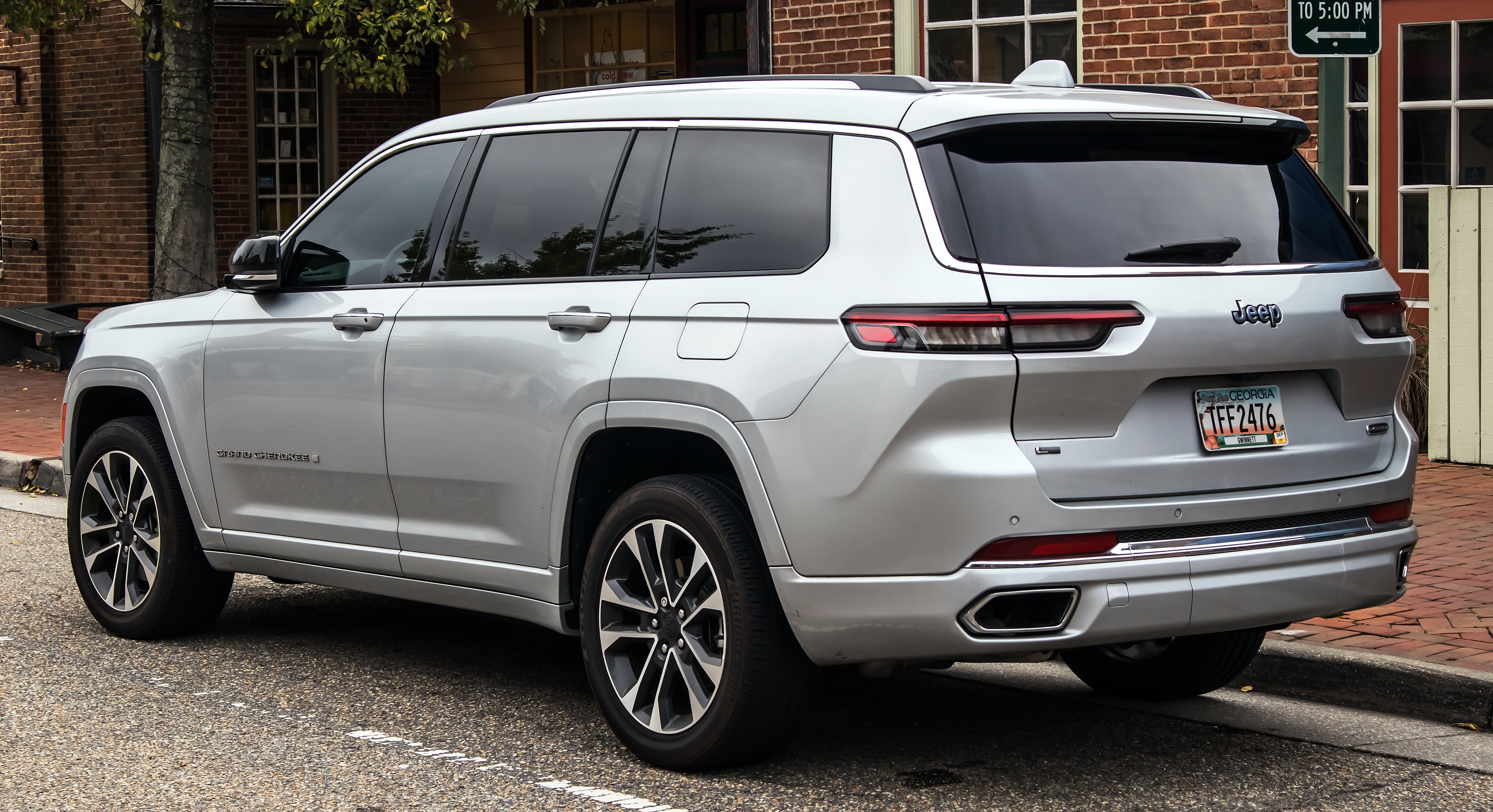
Grand Cherokee L Overland

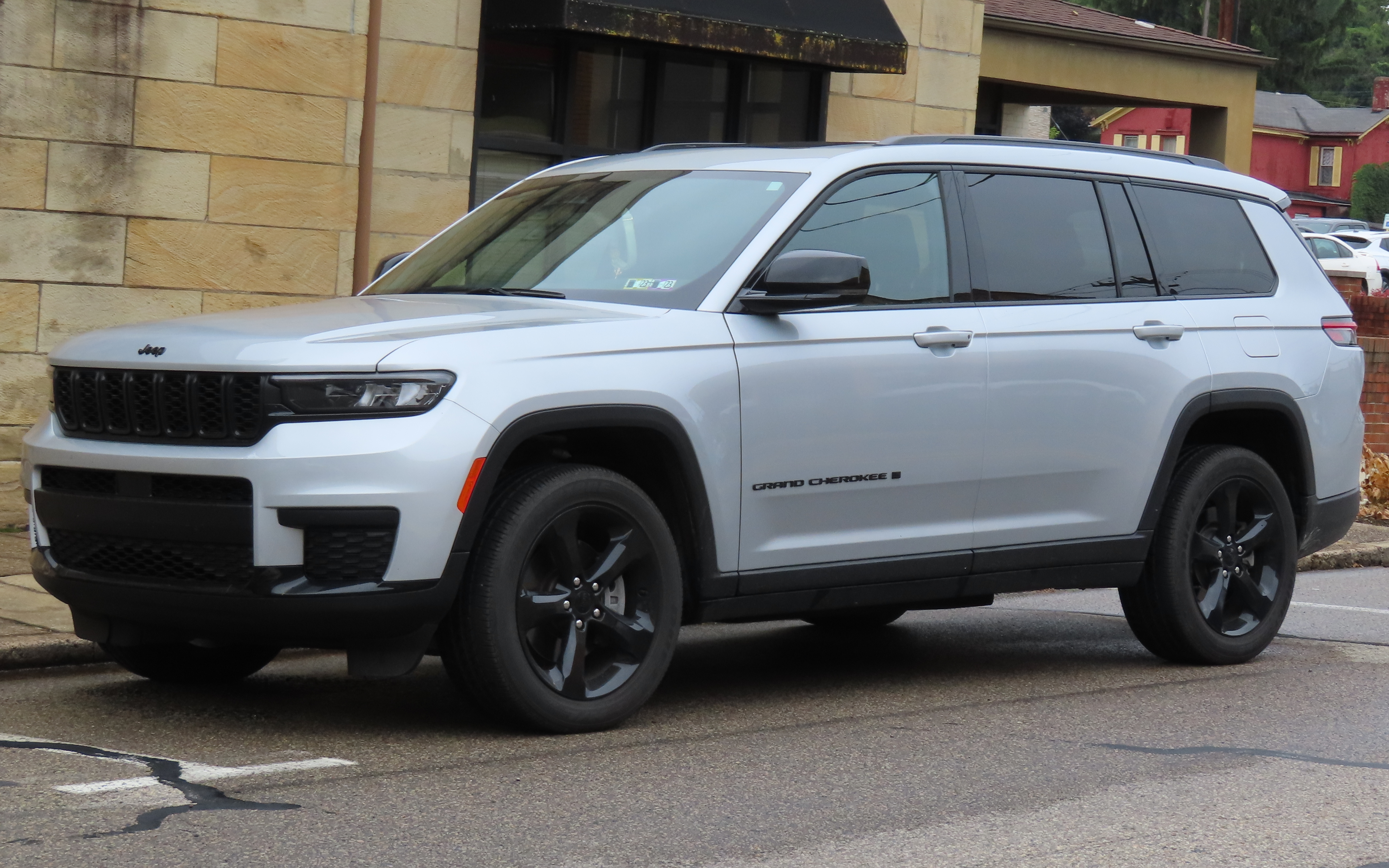
2023 Jeep Grand Cherokee L Altitude

=== Grand Cherokee ===
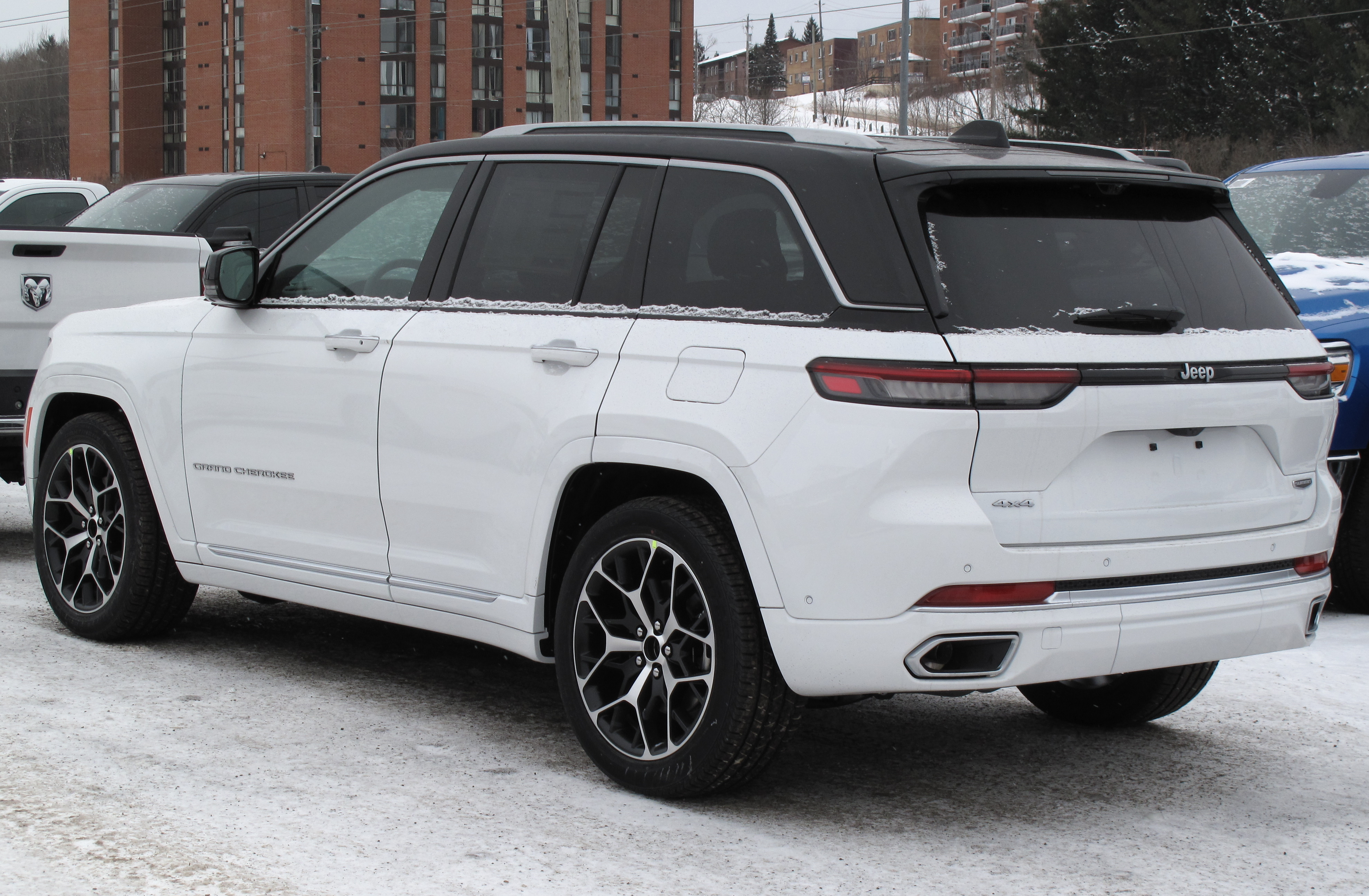
2022 Grand Cherokee Summit Reserve

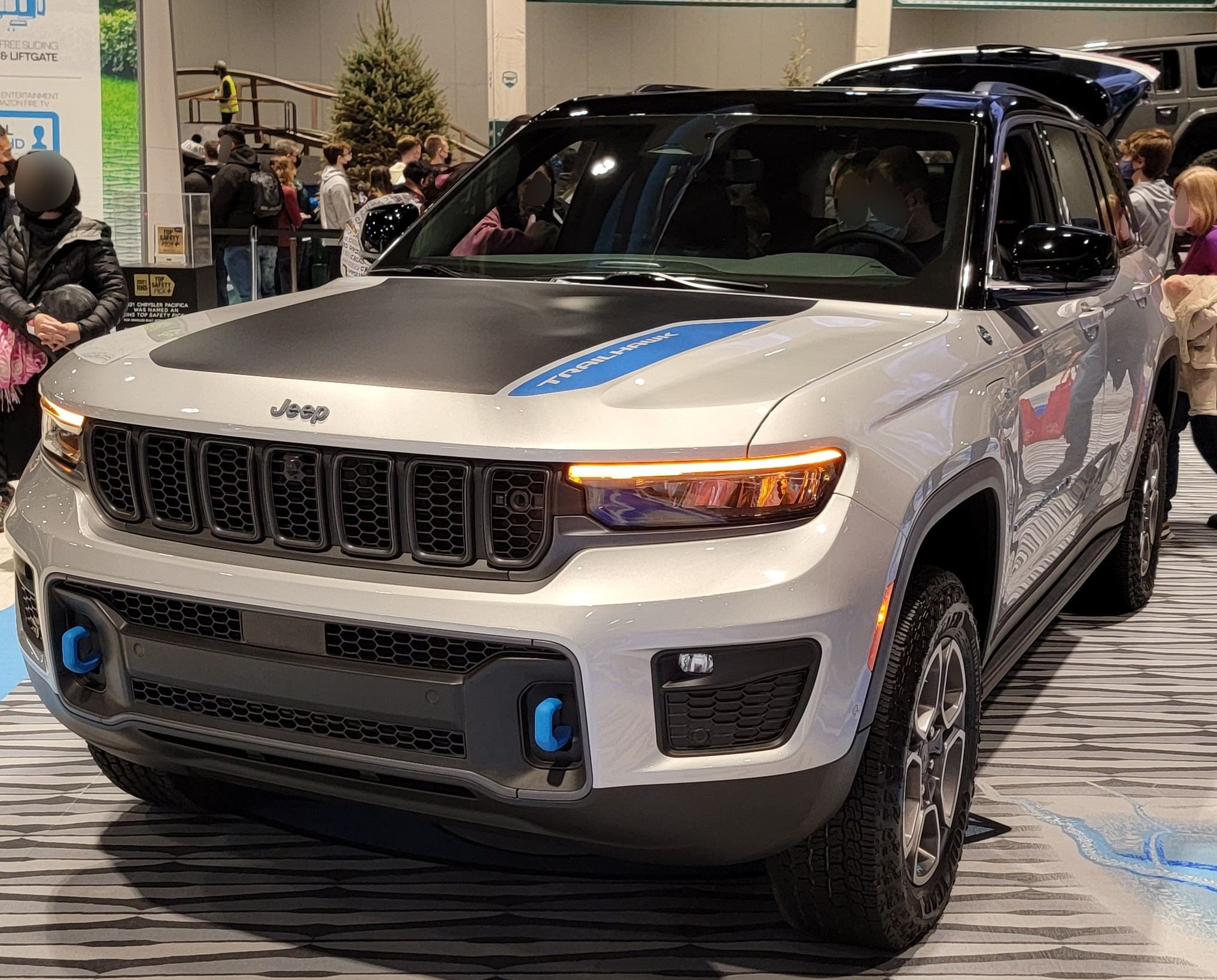
2022 Grand Cherokee 4xe Trailhawk

Originally scheduled to be released for the 2021 model year, but delayed until 2022, The two-row Grand Cherokee is available in seven trim levels: Laredo, Altitude, Limited, Overland, Trailhawk, Summit, and Summit Reserve (the off-road-oriented Trailhawk trim will not be available on the long wheelbase Grand Cherokee L model). Compared to the previous generation two-row Grand Cherokee, the total passenger volume increases by 4.1 cubic feet (120 L), while cargo space is up 1.4 cubic feet (40 L).

Engine choices are carried over from the previous generation Grand Cherokee (WK2), with two naturally-aspirated units, but also added a turbocharged gasoline/electric plug-in hybrid (PHEV) powertrain.

The base engine on all non-PHEV Grand Cherokees is the 3.6 L Pentastar V6 gasoline engine, producing 290 hp (294 PS; 216 kW), and 257 lb⋅ft (348 N⋅m; 36 kg⋅m) of torque.

The optional engine, available on all non-PHEV Grand Cherokee trims aside from the Laredo, Altitude, and Limited, is the 5.7 L Hemi V8 gasoline engine with the Multi Displacement System (MDS) cylinder deactivation system, producing 360 horsepower (365 PS; 268 kW), and 390 lb⋅ft (529 N⋅m; 54 kg⋅m) of torque. When equipped with the 5.7 L HEMI V8 gasoline engine, the all-new Grand Cherokee has a maximum towing capacity of 7,200 pounds (3,300 kg). However, the 2023 models no longer offer this V8 option.

The 4xe PHEV powertrain, first available in Jeep Wrangler (JL), is introduced to the Grand Cherokee in this generation. It is available on the Limited, Trailhawk, Overland, Summit, and Summit Reserve trim levels. It uses an electrically assisted 2.0 L turbocharged four-cylinder making a total of 375 hp (380 PS; 280 kW) and 470 lb⋅ft (637 N⋅m; 65 kg⋅m). The 17 kWh battery pack provides an estimated 25 miles (40 km) of range when running solely on electric power. It can tow 6,000 pounds (2,722 kg). Starting from 2023 models, Trailhawk trim will only available in 4xe PHEV.

All engines, including the PHEV powertrain, are paired with an eight-speed automatic transmission, with Stellantis manufacturing the 850RE transmission for the 3.6 L model, and ZF manufacturing the 8HP70 transmission for the 5.7 L model (all transmissions are based on the design of the ZF 8HP transmission, and use a new rotary controller in the center console). In addition to rear-wheel-drive, three different four-wheel-drive systems are available, and use a new Selec-Terrain toggle controller (the Quadra Drive II four-wheel-drive system also features the Quadra-Lift air suspension system). The Quadra-Lift system can raise or lower the vehicle to different heights and is standard on all Trailhawk models.

At the 2022 New York International Auto Show (NYIAS), Jeep introduced the 2022 Grand Cherokee 4xe High Altitude Edition Package. Available on both Summit and Summit Reserve trims, the High Altitude Edition Package features dark exterior accents and unique 21-inch wheels. Following the introduction of the Grand Cherokee 4xe, the High Altitude Edition Package will also be available on the 2022 Jeep Grand Cherokee L in both Summit and Summit Reserve trims. A new exterior color, Hydro Blue Pearlcoat, will also be available on most Grand Cherokee, Grand Cherokee 4xe, and Grand Cherokee L models.

=== Safety ===
ANCAP test results Jeep Grand Cherokee SWB petrol variants (2022, aligned with Euro NCAP)
Test	Points	%
Overall:	4 /5 stars	
Adult occupant:	31.06	81%
Child occupant:	45.89	93%
Pedestrian:	43.79	81%
Safety assist:	13.60	84%

ANCAP test results Jeep Grand Cherokee LWB petrol & SWB PHEV variants (2022, aligned with Euro NCAP)
Test	Points	%
Overall:	4 /5 stars	
Adult occupant:	31.83	83%
Child occupant:	45.89	93%
Pedestrian:	43.79	81%
Safety assist:	13.60	84%

Euro NCAP test results Jeep Grand Cherokee 2.0 PHEV 'Overland' (LHD) (2022)
Test	Points	%
Overall:	5 /5 stars	
Adult occupant:	31.9	84%
Child occupant:	44	89%
Pedestrian:	43.8	81%
Safety assist:	13	81%

2022 Jeep Grand Cherokee L Laredo IIHS scores
Small overlap front (Driver)	Good	
Small overlap front (Passenger)	Good	
Moderate overlap front (Original test)	Good	
Moderate overlap front (Updated test)	Poor	
Headlights	Poor	
Front crash prevention (Vehicle-to-Vehicle)	Superior	standard
Front crash prevention (Vehicle-to-Pedestrian, day)	Advanced	standard
Front crash prevention (Vehicle-to-Pedestrian, night)	Superior	
Seatbelt reminders	Marginal	

== Sales ==
Calendar year	United States	Canada	Australia	Europe	China	Egypt	Outside North America	Total
1992	128,960							
1993	217,430							
1994	238,512							
1995	252,168							
1996	279,195		2,001					
1997	260,875		2,139	17,991				
1998	229,135		1,179	16,532				
1999	300,031		2,130	26,028				
2000	271,723		2,219	24,731				
2001	223,612		1,816	18,865				
2002	224,233		1,800	23,836				
2003	207,479		1,778	20,681				
2004	182,313	7,454	1,399	18,684				
2005	213,584	9,166	1,346	16,855				
2006	139,148	7,075	1,365	20,597			4,058	
2007	120,937	8,078	1,077	15,934			3,250	
2008	73,678	7,617	629	8,384			2,856	
2009	50,328	6,254	404	4,215			14,869	71,451
2010	84,635	7,255	441	3,785				
2011	127,744	10,283	3,374	6,161				
2012	154,734	10,416	8,373	10,383			165,150	223,196
2013	174,275	11,587	12,931	11,155			69,143	255,005
2014	183,786	13,150	16,582	13,820			82,631	279,567
2015	195,958	11,605	11,964	13,719			69,673	277,236
2016	212,273	15,091	6,379	13,191				
2017	240,696	16,877	5,356	10,167				
2018	224,908	14,099	3,939	7,963				
2019	242,969	19,459	2,986	7,129				
2020	209,786	15,521	2,870	4,636				
2021	264,444	19,442	3,010	534				
2022	223,345	16,682		189				
2023	244,594	14,753			520			
2024	216,148	12,584	645		17	176		
2025	210,082	9,094			304	285		

== Recalls ==
=== Fuel system integrity ===
In 2010, the National Highway Traffic Safety Administration (NHTSA) launched an investigation into 1993–2004 model year Jeep Grand Cherokees, which involved the fuel tanks of these SUVs. In moderate- to high-energy rear collisions, the fuel tank (located behind the rear axle) could be compromised structurally, resulting in fuel leakage and fire. The NHTSA claims that it has reports of 157 deaths resulting from fires caused by Grand Cherokees crashing. Also affected are 2002–2007 Jeep Liberty models and 1986–2001 Jeep Cherokee models, which total about 5.1 million affected vehicles.

In June 2013, Chrysler Corporation responded to the recall, agreeing to recall 2.7 million Jeeps, though eliminating both the 1986–2001 Jeep Cherokee (XJ) and 1999–2004 Jeep Grand Cherokee WJ from the recall. The recall will include 2.7 million 1993–1998 Jeep Grand Cherokee ZJ and 2002–2007 Jeep Liberty KJ vehicles.

Two weeks prior to this recall, Chrysler Corporation claimed that the affected Jeep vehicles were safe, citing the vehicles' rates of fatal rear-impact crashes involving fire as well as their compliance with then-current requirements of FMVSS standard No. 301, though agreed to recall the affected vehicles later. To remedy the problem, Jeep dealerships will install a trailer hitch onto the rear bumpers of the vehicles that will protect the fuel tank if the vehicle is involved in a rear impact. If an affected vehicle is not currently equipped with a trailer hitch, one will be installed onto it, and older Jeep and non-factory aftermarket trailer hitches will be replaced with one from Chrysler Corporation. Despite the recall, the market for these Jeep vehicles has not suffered.

=== Transfer case actuator ===
In May 2013, there was a recall of WKs with the Quadra-Drive II and Quadra-Trac II systems. This followed cases of cars rolling away due to the transfer case moving into neutral of its own accord, and the owner not having applied the parking brake. The recall revised the Final Drive Control Module (FDCM) software. However, following the recall, there were widespread reports on enthusiast websites of both the neutral and low ratio modes of the transfer case ceasing to function, and a survey showed that fewer than 10% of respondents had experienced no issues with the recall. Attempting to resolve these issues, some dealers subsequently replaced the transfer case actuator, FDCM, and even the transfer case itself, often at customer expense and usually to no avail.

The cause of the roll-aways was faulty soldering in the transfer case actuator. It has been deduced that the revised software detects this by noting any deviation in resistance and, thereupon, locks the transfer case in the high ratio for safety, but it is overreacting to minor resistance variations from other causes. Originally, Chrysler dealers claimed that the loss of neutral and low ratios following the recall was a coincidence; then they claimed that the revised software was revealing pre-existing faults in the system, despite it occurring even with new parts. Chrysler has also claimed that only a small fraction of cars have issues following the recall; but most users never have to use the low ratio and may never discover the fault. Four years after this recall, its issues remain unresolved.

=== Transmission parking pawl ===
In April 2016, the National Highway Traffic Safety Administration (NHTSA) ordered a recall of 2014 and 2015 Jeep Grand Cherokees and other cars that use an electronic gear shifter because it sometimes does not go into (or does not remain in) the park position, despite the operator's best intentions. Consumers reported that they put the car in park and left the engine running, and then were surprised when the car rolled away under power.

An investigation by FCA US and the National Highway Traffic Safety Administration found that some drivers have exited their vehicles without first selecting "PARK." Such behavior may pose a safety risk if a vehicle's engine is still running. The company is aware of 41 injuries that are potentially related. It was also the cause of actor Anton Yelchin's death. The vehicles involved in these events were inspected, and no evidence of equipment failure was found. The vehicles also deliver warning chimes and alert messages if their driver-side doors are opened while their engines are still running and "PARK" is not engaged. However, the investigation suggested these measures may be insufficient to deter some drivers from exiting their vehicles without selecting "PARK," so FCA US will enhance the warnings and transmission-shift strategy on these vehicles. The enhancements will combine warnings with a transmission-shift strategy to automatically prevent a vehicle from moving, under certain circumstances, even if the driver fails to select "PARK."

The final fix was Safety Recall S27 / NHTSA 16V-240, a software update that adds an "auto park" feature that will automatically put the vehicle in park if the driver's door is opened and the driver's seatbelt is unlatched while the vehicle is stopped or moving slowly.

Jeep has now replaced the shifter with a conventional lever, which stays in position for late-2016 models.

=== Other recalls ===
In July 2017, 2012–14 Jeep Grand Cherokee SUVs were recalled due to possible alternator failure. If the alternator fails, the vehicle may stall, and/if the alternator has a short circuit, a fire may occur.

In October 2017, 2011–14 model year Grand Cherokees were recalled due to improperly installed brake shields in some vehicles.

On February 25, 2022, Stellantis and Jeep issued a stop-sale order for 2022 Grand Cherokee and Grand Cherokee L models in dealership inventory. The order was issued after it was discovered that the Radio Frequency Hub Module (RFHM) would cause some vehicles to not recognize the key fob, rendering the vehicles unable to start. This would require the vehicles to be towed to the dealership. This order only affected a limited number of vehicles, and parts were shipped to dealerships as soon as they became available.

== See also ==
- Jeep Cherokee (SJ), the similarly named 1974–1983 predecessor
