= Milt Sunde =

American football player (1942–2020)

No. 64
- Position: Guard

Personal information
- Born: February 1, 1942; Minneapolis, Minnesota, U.S.
- Died: April 21, 2020 (aged 78); Bloomington, Minnesota, U.S.
- Listed height: 6 ft 2 in (1.88 m)
- Listed weight: 250 lb (113 kg)

Career information
- High school: Bloomington (Bloomington, Minnesota)
- College: Minnesota (1960–1963)
- NFL draft: 1964: 20th round, 271st overall pick

Career history
- Minnesota Vikings (1964–1974); New York Jets (1975)*
- * Offseason or practice squad member only

Awards and highlights
- NFL champion (1969); Pro Bowl (1966); Minnesota Vikings 25th Anniversary Team; National champion (1960)

Career NFL statistics
- Games played: 147
- Games started: 112
- Fumble recoveries: 1
- Stats at Pro Football Reference

Milton John Sunde (February 1, 1942 – April 21, 2020) was an American professional football player. He played professionally as a guard in the National Football League (NFL) for the Minnesota Vikings from 1964 to 1974. Sunde attended Bloomington High School and the University of Minnesota.

== Early life ==
Sunde was born on February 1, 1942, in Minneapolis, Minnesota, and grew up and resided in nearby Bloomington, Minnesota. His father George, a Swedish immigrant, raised Sunde and his two brothers after his mother died while the boys were very young. They lived in an apartment above George's welding shop business. Sunde attended Bloomington High School. He played tackle on the football team under coach Shorty Cochran. The team was 0–8 in 1958, and then went 8–0 in 1959, led by Sunde and running back Jerry Pelletier. Sunde was known for his determination and strong work ethic. He won All-State honors in football.

He was 185 pounds (83.9 kg) when he graduated high school.

== College ==
Sunde attended the University of Minnesota and played college football for the Golden Gophers under coach Murray Warmath, at tackle, from 1961 to 1963. During his sophomore season, the team went 8–2 and won the Rose Bowl. Pelletier was also his teammate at Minnesota, playing running back. Sunde was a serious and team-oriented person. During their sophomore year, Pelletier was having academic problems. Sunde worked with Pelletier and helped turn his grades around by their junior year. In 1963 as a senior, Sunde became a team captain.

Future Hall of Fame defensive lineman Carl Eller was Sunde's Golden Gophers' teammate, as well as his future teammate on the Minnesota Vikings from 1964 to 1974. As a sophomore and junior, Sunde and Eller also played with Bobby Bell at Minnesota, the 1962 Outland Trophy winner, who has been named multiple times as one of the top 100 professional football players ever.

Sunde played in the north–south college all-star game at tackle.

Sunde had built himself up to 225 pounds (102.1 kg) in college. However, by the end of the 1963 football season, after playing in the north–south game, he was down to 210 pounds (95.3 kg).

== Professional career ==
The Vikings selected Sunde in the 20th round of the 1964 NFL draft (271st overall), having selected Eller in the first round of the same draft with the sixth pick. Until he was drafted, because of his small size for a lineman, Sunde did not consider it was possible for him to play in the NFL.

Sunde played his entire 11-year career with the Vikings as a guard (1964–1974). Sunde played under head coach Norm Van Brocklin from 1964 to 1966 (who reached the Hall of Fame as a quarterback) and then from 1967 to 1974 under Hall of Fame coach Bud Grant. From 1964 to 1967, he started 40 games at left guard next to left tackle Grady Alderman. From 1968 to 1973 he started at right guard, mostly playing alongside future Hall of Fame right tackle Ron Yary from 1969 to 1973. Throughout his entire career with the Vikings, he played alongside future Hall of Fame center Mick Tingelhoff.

By training camp in 1964, Sunde increased his weight to 240 (108.9 kg) or 245 pounds (111.1 kg). By the time the season started, however, he was down to 233 pounds. He began the season playing on special teams. By mid-season he was starting some games at left guard. He finished the 1964 season having started in five games; but his weight fell below 230 pounds by the end of the 1964 season.

Sunde became the Vikings' full-time starter at left guard in 1965, starting all 14 games. In the season's first game, he filled in at left tackle for Grady Alderman, but played guard the rest of the season. In 1966, Sunde again started all 14 games at left guard, and he was named to the Pro Bowl for the first and only time of his career. Tingelhoff and Alderman were also named to the Pro Bowl that year. In 1966, the Vikings were fourth in the NFL in total yards gained, third in rushing and seventh in passing.

Bud Grant became the Vikings' head coach in 1967, and Sunde remained at starting left guard. However, Sunde suffered a sprained knee in an October game against the Baltimore Colts and missed four games that season, while starting only seven games. He was replaced by Jim Vellone. In 1968, Vellone continued as a full-time starter, but Sunde took over for veteran guard Larry Bowie, who originally had to be hospitalized because of severe headaches. Sunde started six games that season; though himself missing a game in December with an ankle injury and being replaced by Bowie.

By 1969, Sunde was the full-time starter at right guard, with Vellone starting at left guard. On running plays, he was considered the Vikings best pulling guard, and was a fine downfield blocker. The 1969 Vikings won the NFL's Central Division with a 12–2 record. They defeated the Los Angeles Rams, 23–20 in the divisional round of the 1969 playoffs. In the Rams game, Sunde faced off against future Hall of Fame defensive tackle Merlin Olsen, one of the NFL's greatest lineman ever. The Vikings went on to win the NFL Championship over the Cleveland Browns, 27–7. The Vikings lost to the Kansas City Chiefs, 23–7 in Super Bowl IV. Sunde was matched against future Hall of Fame left tackle Curley Culp in the Super Bowl.

Sunde started all 14 games each season at right guard from 1970 to 1972. During those years, the Vikings went 12–2, 11–3 and 7–7, respectively. In 1973, Sunde was replaced in the starting lineup with John Ward. Sunde returned to starting right guard later in the season when Ward broke his ankle in a November 1973 game against the Detroit Lions, and Sunde came in to replace Ward. After that game, coach Grant said Sunde's playing was as good as it had ever been. He started the remaining five games of the regular season. The Vikings finished the season 12–2, again winning the NFC's Central Division. The Vikings defeated the Dallas Cowboys, 27–10 in the NFC Championship Game, but Sunde suffered a knee injury that kept him out of Super Bowl VIII, a 24–7 loss to the Miami Dolphins.

1974 was Sunde's last season in the NFL. He played in 11 games, starting three. The Vikings finished the season 10–4, winning the Central Division again. They reached the Super Bowl, for the third time in six years, but lost Super Bowl IX to the Pittsburgh Steelers, 16–6. Sunde did not start in the game. The Vikings waived Sunde before the start of the 1975 season. He was claimed by the New York Jets, but chose to retire. He was not progressing at the Jets training camp as he would have liked, and said "'I didn't want to be remembered as the guy who couldn't do it'".

== Legacy and honors ==
In 1974, Sunde received the YMCA-Brian Picolo Award for Humanitarian Service, as the chair of Walk for Mankind, a charitable organization in the Minneapolis-St. Paul region serving the needs of those in poverty. He and 11 other Vikings and their families formed a Bible study group in 1974.

== Personal life ==
Sunde worked as a substitute teacher at Bloomington's Kennedy High School in the off season. He worked toward a Master's degree in physical education at the University of Minnesota while playing for the Vikings. During his NFL career, he would travel with an independent basketball team of Vikings players to raise money for charitable causes. He operated a fitness and training business after retiring.

== Death ==
Sunde died on April 22, 2020, at the age of 78. He suffered from Parkinson's disease and Alzheimer's disease. He was survived by his wife of 54 years, Barbara, four daughters and eight grandchildren.
