= Mark Holtzapple =

American chemical engineer

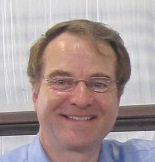
- Born: 1956; Enid, Oklahoma

Mark Holtzapple is a chemical engineering professor at Texas A&M University. His research focuses on technologies that improve sustainability.

== Life ==
=== Childhood ===
In 1956, Mark Holtzapple was born to Joan Carol and Arthur Robert Holtzapple in Enid, Oklahoma. In his early years, Mark's father was an Air Force pilot, so the family moved frequently. After Enid, his family moved to Dover, Delaware, and then to Japan. In 1961, his father left the Air Force to become an architect and his family returned to the United States to live in York, Pennsylvania. In 1972, the family moved to Bloomington, Minnesota where he graduated from Bloomington Lincoln High School in 1974.

=== Education ===
In 1978, Mark Holtzapple earned his B.S. in chemical engineering at Cornell University. In 1981, he earned his Ph.D. in chemical engineering from the University of Pennsylvania.

=== Career ===
From 1981 to 1985, Mark Holtzapple served in the U.S. Army, mostly stationed at the United States Army Natick Soldier Research, Development and Engineering Center, where he rose to the rank of captain. There, he researched water desalination and microclimate cooling, a method to prevent heat stress in soldiers encapsulated in chemical protective clothing.

In 1986, he joined the Department of Chemical Engineering at Texas A&M University. Dr. Holtzapple's research interests include the following: fuels and chemicals from biomass, food and feed processing, water desalination, high-efficiency air conditioning, high-efficiency engines, jet ejectors, compressors, expanders, conversion of waste heat to electricity, high-torque electric motors, and vertical-lift aircraft.

== Awards and honors ==
=== Teaching ===
- Fluor Distinguished Teaching Award, 2012
- Professor of the Year, AIChE Student Chapter, 2008
- Corps of Cadets Teaching Award, 2002
- Tenneco Meritorious Teaching Award, 2001
- AIChE Student Chapter Award of Excellence, 1992
- Tenneco Meritorious Teaching Award, 1991
- Texas A&M Association of Former Students Distinguished Teaching Award for Texas A&M, 1991
- Dow Excellence in Teaching Award (Tenured Faculty), 1991
- Texas A&M Association of Former Students Distinguished Teaching Award for the College of Engineering, 1990
- General Dynamics Excellence in Teaching Award, 1990
- AIChE Student Chapter Award of Excellence, 1989
- AIChE Student Chapter Award of Excellence, 1988
- Dow Excellence in Teaching Award (Untenured Faculty), 1988

=== Research ===
- Dean of Engineering Excellence Awards, 2016
- Odebrecht Award for Sustainable Development, 2014
- William Keeler Memorial Award for Contribution, 2014
- College of Engineering Faculty Fellow (sponsored by George Armistead, Jr.), 2014
- USAA (United Services Automobile Association) Distinguished Lecture, 2010
- Commercialization Rising Star Award, Research Valley Partnership, 2008
- Chevron Faculty Fellow, 2008
- Halliburton Professorship Award for Excellence in Teaching and Research, 2008
- Excellence in Innovation Award, Texas A&M University, 2007
- Walston Chubb Award for Innovation, Sigma Xi, 2006
- Top 100 Energy Technology, New Energy Congress, 2006
- Texas A&M University Distinguished Lecture, 2006
- Texas A&M Ingenuity Award, 2003
- Testified at field hearing before U.S. House of Representatives, 2003
- Halliburton Professorship, 2002–03
- Ford Fellowship, 2001
- Brockett Professor, 2000
- TEES Senior Fellow, 1999
- TEES Faculty Fellow, 1998
- McGraw-Hill Environmental Champion Award, 1997
- TEES Fellow, 1996
- Presidential Green Chemistry Challenge Award, 1996
- TEES Fellow, 1995
- Who's Who in Science and Engineering, 2nd Edition

=== Military ===
- First Prize, Army Science Symposium, 1986
- U.S. Army Meritorious Service Medal, 1985
- Petroleum Basic Course Distinguished Military Graduate, 1982
- Officer Basic Course Distinguished Military Graduate, 1981
- ROTC Distinguished Military Graduate, 1978
- American Society of Military Engineers National Citation, 1977
- American Society of Military Engineers Scholarship, 1977
- Four-year Army ROTC Scholarship, 1974

=== Academic ===
- Texas A&M Commencement Keynote Speaker, 2009
- McGraw-Hill Science, Engineering, and Mathematics Group's First Edition of the Year Award, 2006
- Who's Who Among America's Teachers, 1996
- Cornell Graduate with Distinction, 1978

=== Public Service ===
- Bush Excellence Award for Faculty in Public Service, 2013

== Teaching ==
Dr. Holtzapple currently teaches thermodynamics, unit operations laboratory, foundations of engineering, bioprocess engineering, and seminar. Previously, he has taught introduction to chemical engineering, reaction kinetics, and bioprocess engineering. He co-authored Foundations of Engineering and Concepts in Engineering.

== Commercialization Activities ==
Dr. Holtzapple's research has resulted in two spin-off companies.

=== Earth Energy Renewables ===
Earth Energy Renewables was founded to commercialize the following technologies:

- MixAlco process — involves the bioconversion of biomass to mixed alcohol fuels, industrial chemicals, and hydrocarbon fuels such as gasoline and jet fuel.
- SoluPro — involves the conversion of proteins, such as chicken feathers, into a soluble syrup

=== StarRotor Corporation ===
StarRotor Corporation was founded to commercialize the following technologies:

- Compressors — these high-efficiency devices employ gerotor geometries to compress gases and vapors
- Expanders — these high-efficiency devices employ gerotor geometries to expand gases and vapors
- Engines — a gerotor compressor and expander are combined in a recuperated Brayton cycle that is 2 to 3 times more efficient than traditional piston engines

== Sources ==
- Texas A&M Department of Chemical Engineering Faculty: Mark Holtzapple
- Texas A&M Department of Chemical Engineering Faculty: Mark Holtzapple
- StarRotor Corporation personnel
- Texas A&M Department of Chemical Engineering Research: Mark Holtzapple
