= Conical screw compressor =

Type of gas compressor

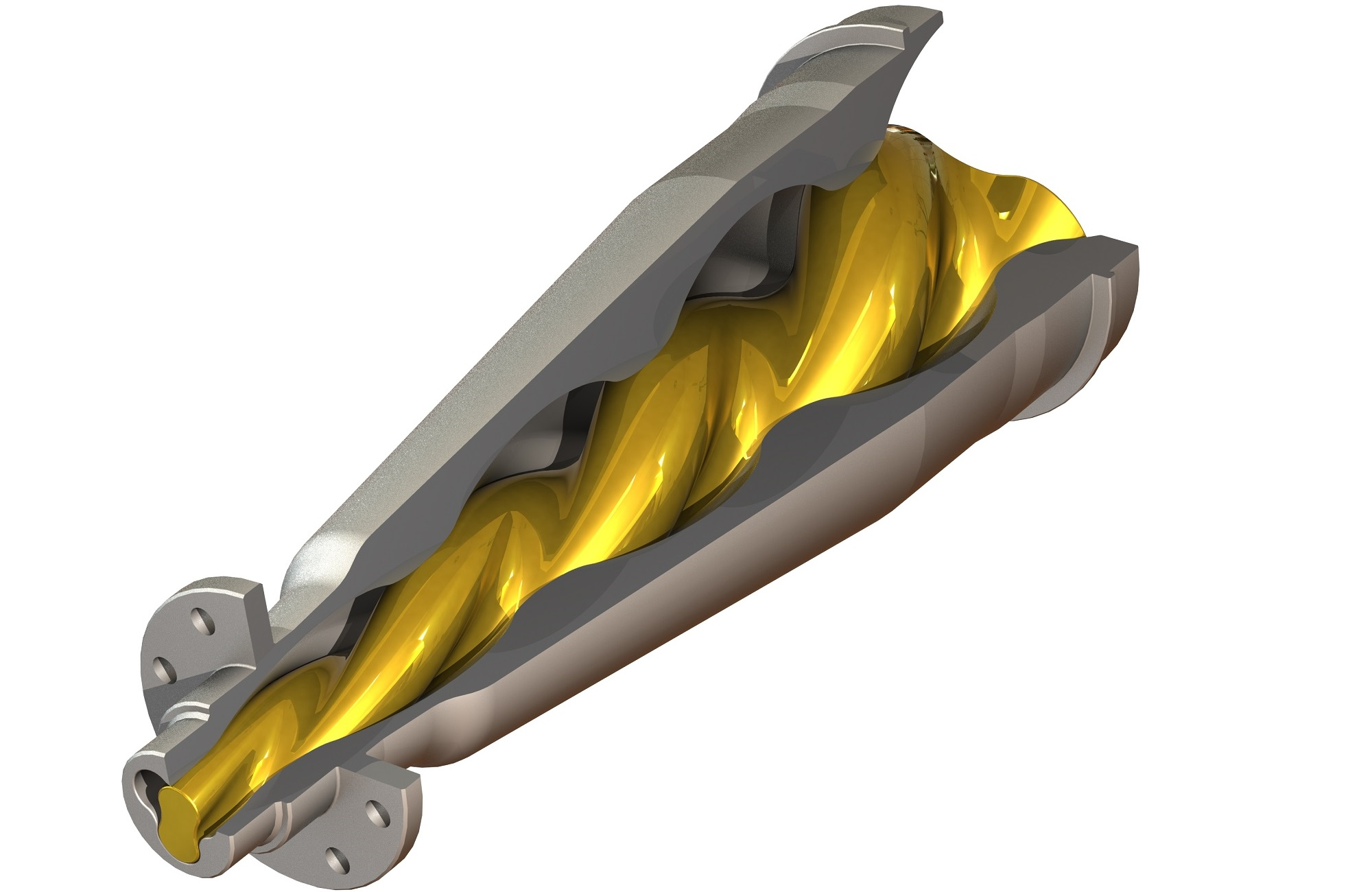
A conical screw compressor. Both parts rotate but the axis of the inner rotor is offset by a small angle.

A gerotor, which approximately illustrates the motion in a cross section of a conical screw compressor.

The conical screw compressor is a type of rotary-screw compressor using a different topology from the typical dual-screw type. In effect it can be thought of as a conical spiral extension of a gerotor, although the exact geometry is somewhat different due to the angular offset. Because of this it does not have the inherent "blow-hole" leakage path which in typical screw compressors is responsible for significant leakage through the assembly and makes low-speed operation impractical. This theoretically allows much smaller rotors to have practical efficiency since at smaller sizes the leakage area does not become as large a portion of the pumping area as in straight screw compressors. In conjunction with the tapering geometry allowing a high compression ratio, this theoretically allows much higher pressures to be achieved in a single stage.

A significant impediment to production is the machining of the outer rotor to the tolerances required. Although the inner rotor can be manufactured with precise CNC machines using common methods, the outer rotor presents significant difficulties due to the restricted access to the interior for precision tooling, and assembling the outer rotor from easier to machine segments presents its own problems. The cost of units is currently very high, but development is ongoing, development is primarily being performed by VERT Rotors who hold patents on this topology.
