= Abraham Lincoln High School (Minnesota) =

School in Bloomington, Minnesota, U.S.

Coordinates: 44°50′30″N 93°18′40″W

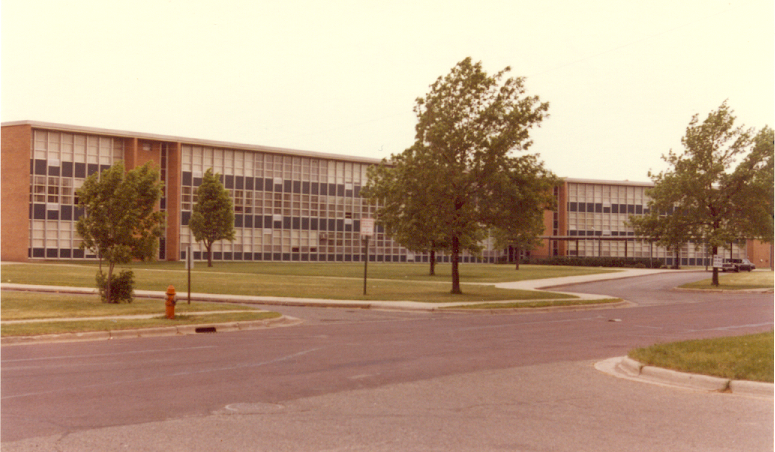
- Lincoln Senior High in 1983
- 8900 Queen Ave. S., Bloomington, MN 55431

Information
- Former name: Bloomington High School
- Established: c. Fall, 1957
- Closed: 1982
- Grades: 9–12
- Mascot: Bear

In 1918, Bloomington, Minnesota opened its first secondary school, Bloomington High School at 10025 Penn Ave. S., the school remaining at this location until a new building opened in the fall of 1957. The new Bloomington High School at (8900 Queen Ave. S., Bloomington MN 55431) with the adjacent Bloomington Stadium, was renamed Abraham Lincoln Senior High School in 1965 when a second high school, John F. Kennedy Senior High School opened. The original location, then known as the "annex", served as the tenth grade school for 1000 sophomores prior to the second high school. Robert Vinatieri was the tenth grade principal.

The school's mascot of Bloomington HS and Lincoln HS was the Bears. School colors were green and white, with gold. The school was a member of the Lake Conference from 1957 to 1982, preceded by membership in the Minnesota Valley Conference. Principals of the school were P. Arthur Hoblit, Dr. Raymond Hanson and Dr. Kent O. Stever. Hubert Olson and Fred Atkinson served as Superintendent of Schools during the 1950s and 1960s to guide the school district to exceptional success.

Additional high schools. John F. Kennedy Senior High School opened in the fall of 1965. Thomas Jefferson Senior High School opened in 1970.

Due to declining enrollments in the late 1970s, Lincoln closed in 1982. Until the 2025-26 school year, Kennedy and Jefferson continued to play their home football games at Bloomington Stadium adjacent to the former Lincoln site. In 2018, a Dallas investor who bought Bloomington High School in 2015 for $20.1 million, sold the property as office space for $26.25 million to Green Door Capital, a Chicago-based private equity firm invested in office spaces. Bloomington High School is now being used as office space, primarily by General Dynamics and Bloomington Public Schools, according to CoStar Group.

== Athletics ==
State Championships
Season	Sport	Number of Championships	Year
Fall	Soccer, Boys	2	1974, 1976
Winter	Alpine (Slalom) Skiing, Boys	3	1971, 1972, 1977
Spring	Golf, Boys	1	1976
Spring	Softball, Girls	1	1957
Total		7	

== Notable alumni ==
- Jim Gustafson – former NFL wide receiver, Minnesota Vikings
- Monte Johnson – former NFL linebacker, Oakland Raiders; Super Bowl XI champion
- Mark Holtzapple – professor of chemical engineering, Texas A&M University
