= Gerotor =

Pistonless trochoidal rotor engine

A gerotor. (Image does not show intake or exhaust ports.)

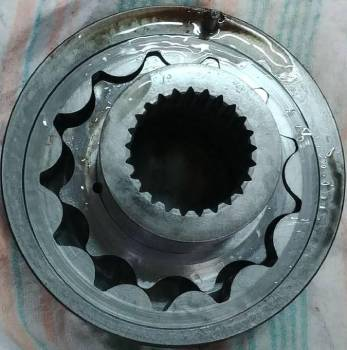
A gerotor

A gerotor (pronounced /dʒəˈroʊtər/) is a type of positive-displacement rotary gear pump. The name gerotor is derived from "generated rotor." A gerotor unit consists of an inner and an outer rotor. The inner rotor has n teeth, while the outer rotor has n + 1 teeth, with n defined as a natural number greater than or equal to 2. The axis of the inner rotor is offset from the axis of the outer rotor and both rotors rotate on their respective axes.

The two rotors are normally fully enclosed in a circular housing with two radial partitions which viewed axially, isolate the inlet half of the gerotor where volume expansion takes place, and the outlet half where volume contraction takes place. In common with a number of other designs of pump, the gerotor pumping function relies on this change in volume.

During the assembly's rotation cycle, fluid trapped in the enclosed voids between the gerotor teeth passes from the inlet side of the pump housing to the outlet side of the pump housing, this process occurring continuously as the gerotor rotates. This process causes fluid to be transferred from the pump inlet to the pump outlet and creates fluid flow and/or pressure to be generated. Gerotor pumps are considered to be positive displacement pump type meaning that their flow rate is closely proportional to rpm and largely independent of pressure.

Gerotor pumps are generally designed using a trochoidal inner rotor and an outer rotor formed by a circle with intersecting circular arcs.

Gerotor pumps are widely used in the pressure lubrication systems of petrol and diesel car engines, also other types of internal combustion powered vehicle and other IC engine applications.

A gerotor can also function as a pistonless rotary engine or fluid/hydraulic motor. High-pressure gas or fluid enters the intake and pushes against the inner and outer rotors, causing both to rotate as the volume between the inner and outer rotor increases. During the volume expansion compression phase, the waste exhaust fluid is allowed to escape to atmosphere and/or pumped out.

== History ==
At the most basic level, a gerotor is essentially one that is moved via fluid power. Originally, this fluid was water; today, the wider use is in hydraulic devices. Myron F. Hill, who might be called the father of the gerotor, in his booklet "Kinematics of Ge-rotors", lists efforts by Galloway in 1787, by Nash and Tilden in 1879, by Cooley in 1900, by Professor Lilly of Dublin University in 1915, and by Feuerheerd in 1918. These men were all working to perfect an internal gear mechanism by a one-tooth difference to provide displacement.

Myron Hill made his first efforts in 1906, then in 1921, gave his entire time to developing the gerotor. He developed a great deal of geometric theory bearing upon these rotors, coined the word GE-ROTOR (meaning generated rotor), and secured basic patents on GE-ROTOR.

Gerotors are widely used today throughout industry and are produced in a variety of shapes and sizes by a number of different methods.

== Uses ==
- Automatic Transmission
- Engine
- Fuel pump
- Gas compressor
- Hydraulic motor
- Limited-slip differential
- Oil pump (internal combustion engine)
- Power steering units

== See also ==
- Conical screw compressor
- Gear pump
- Wankel engine
