= Dodge Durango =

American mid-size SUV

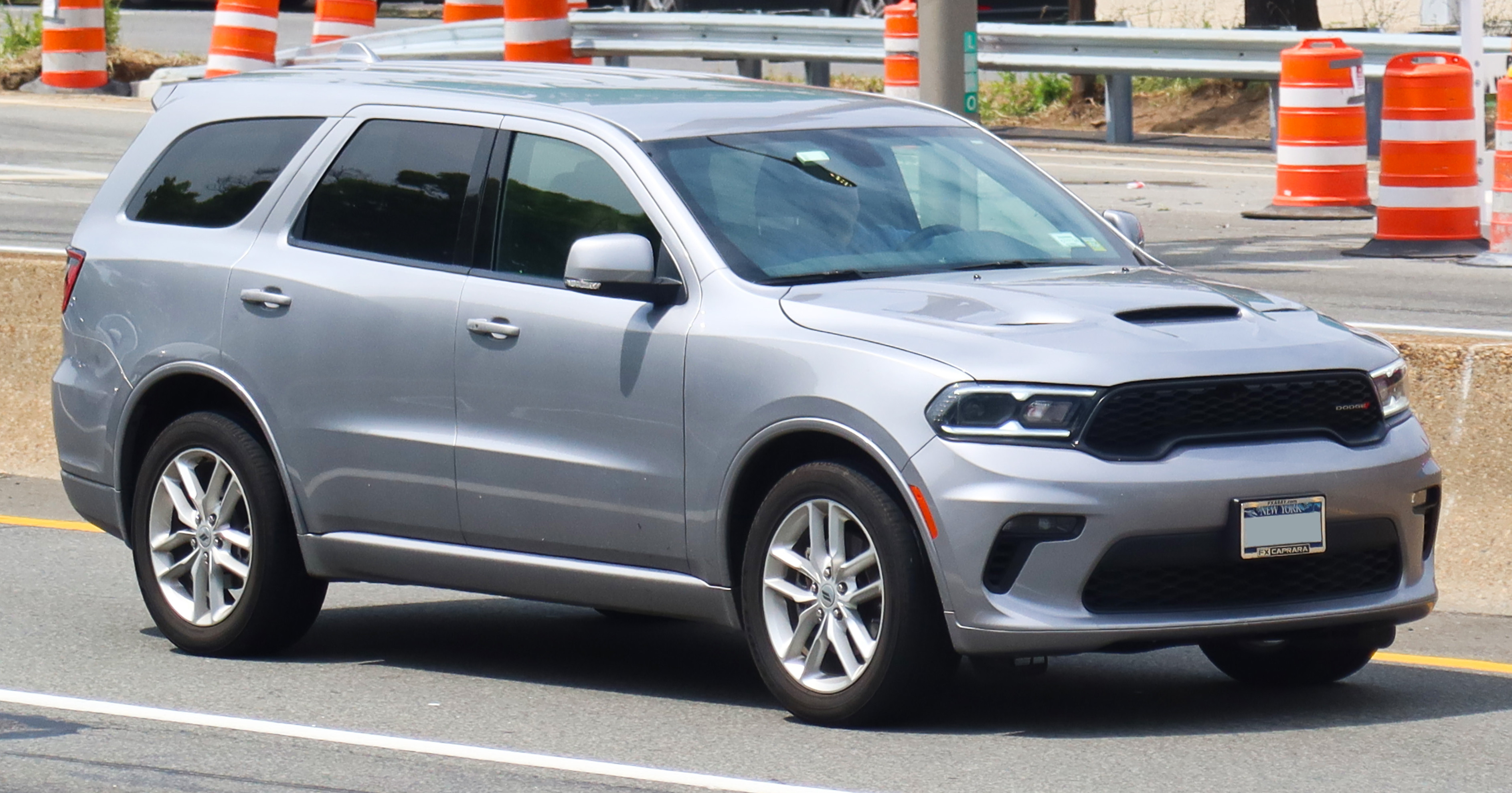
- 2021 Dodge Durango GT

Overview
- Manufacturer: Dodge (Note: Chrysler Corporation (1997–1998); DaimlerChrysler (1998–2007); Chrysler LLC (2007–2009); Chrysler Group LLC (2009–2014); FCA US LLC (2014–2021); Stellantis North America (2021–present))
- Production: 1997–present
- Model years: 1998–2009; 2011–present

Body and chassis
- Class: Mid-size SUV (1998–2009); Mid-size crossover SUV (2011–present)
- Body style: 5-door SUV
- Layout: Front engine, rear-wheel drive / Four-wheel drive
- Chassis: Body-on-frame (1998–2009); Unibody (2011–present)
- Related: Dodge Dakota/Dodge Ram (1998–2009); Jeep Grand Cherokee (2011–2022)

Chronology
- Predecessor: Dodge Ramcharger; Dodge Town Wagon

The Dodge Durango is a mid-size SUV produced by Dodge starting with the 1998 model year. The first two generations were very similar in that both were based on the Dodge Dakota and Dodge Ram, both featured a body-on-frame construction and both were produced at the Newark Assembly Plant in Newark, Delaware through the 2009 model year.

The third-generation Durango began with the 2011 model year. It is built on the same platform as the Jeep Grand Cherokee, features unibody construction, and has been assembled at the Jefferson North Assembly Plant in Detroit, Michigan, since late 2010.

Each generation had options for different engine sizes and power ratings, with different transmissions also. In 2009 a hybrid variant was introduced, but ended quickly with the second generation Durango. From 2007 to 2009 the Durango was available as the Chrysler Aspen from Chrysler. Over two million Durangos have been sold since it was introduced in 1998.

== First generation (DN; 1998) ==
First generation
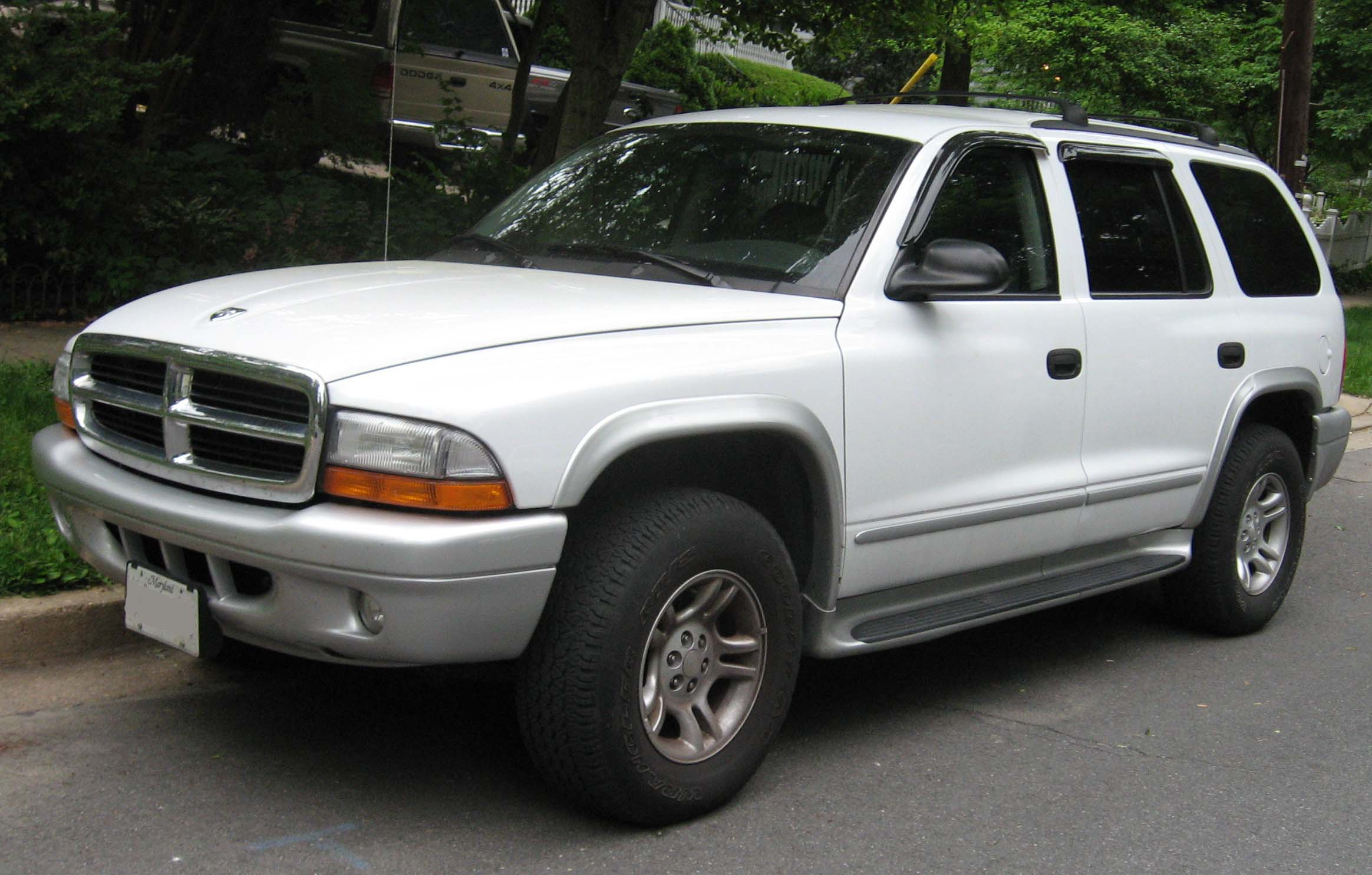
- 1998–2003 Dodge Durango

Overview
- Production: 1997–2003
- Model years: 1998–2003
- Assembly: Newark, Delaware, United States (Newark Assembly)
- Designer: Dennis Myles (1995)

Body and chassis
- Platform: Chrysler DN platform
- Chassis: Body-on-frame
- Related: Dodge Dakota

Powertrain
- Engine: 3.9 L (239 cu in) Magnum V6; 4.7 L (287 cu in) Power Tech V8; 5.2 L (318 cu in) Magnum V8; 5.9 L (360 cu in) Magnum V8
- Transmission: 4-speed TorqueFlite automatic 4-speed RFE automatic 5-speed RFE automatic

Dimensions
- Wheelbase: 116.2 in (2,951 mm)
- Length: 193.5 in (4,915 mm) (2001–2003); 193.3 in (4,910 mm) (1997–2000)
- Width: 71.5 in (1,816 mm) (1997–2000); 71.3 in (1,811 mm) (2000–2003)
- Height: 70.0 in (1,778 mm) (2001–2003); 72.9 in (1,852 mm) (1997–2000)
- Curb weight: 4,689 lb (2,127 kg)

The Durango was marketed as a sturdy truck-based SUV designed to hold up to seven passengers and tow up to 7,500 lb (3,400 kg) when properly equipped. The Durango shared a front end, instrument panel, and front seats with the Dakota pickup on which it was based, and its taillights and liftgate handle with Chrysler's minivan models of the time (the Dodge Caravan, Plymouth Voyager and Chrysler Town & Country). Original designs of the eight-passenger Durango featured a rear-facing third-row similar to many older station wagons. To make room for a more practical forward-facing third row, Dodge shortened the length of the front doors and raised the roof two inches (5 cm) beyond the front seats, allowing for stadium seating. The Durango's roof rack was designed to mask the appearance of the raised roof.

The 4.7 L PowerTech V8 replaced the 5.2 L Magnum V8 engine for 2000; however, the 5.2 was still available in the early 2000 models. In that same year, a special AWD performance version called the R/T was released with a 5.9 L Magnum V8. In 1999 and 2000, a limited-edition Shelby S.P.360 version was offered that featured a supercharged version of the 5.9 L Magnum V8 engine. Output is 360 hp (268 kW; 365 PS) and 412 lb⋅ft (559 N⋅m) of torque. Exterior modifications include unique wheels, tires, suspension, and bumpers. It came standard with Viper blue paint with two racing stripes down the center of the truck. It had a 0 to 60 mph (0 to 97 km/h) time of 7.1 seconds. The top speed was 142 mph (229 km/h).

=== Model year changes ===
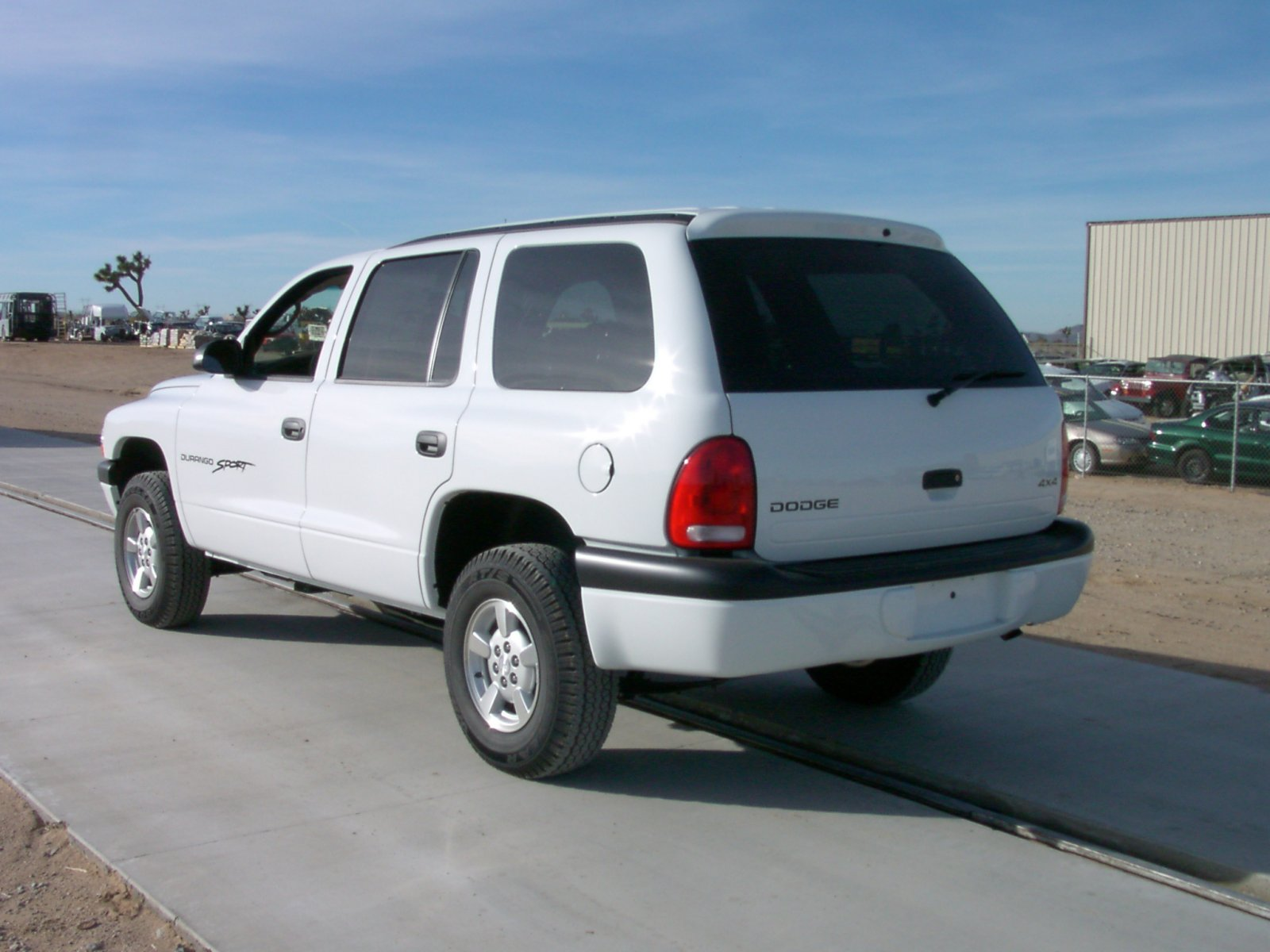
Dodge Durango Sport

For 1999, the Durango was made available with two-wheel drive. A 3.9 L Magnum V6 engine was available, but few were sold. Minor changes were made for the second year, two new paint colors, and options that included 6-by-9-inch (150 mm × 230 mm) heated rearview mirrors and steering-wheel-mounted radio controls. Leather seats became standard on SLT Plus models, and body-color wheel flares became standard on SLT Plus and four-wheel drive models.

The 2000 model year included a new 4.7 L Magnum V8 engine, which replaced the reliable 5.2 L Magnum V8, as the standard engine for four-wheel drive models. The 3.9 L Magnum V6 engine was no longer available, leaving only V8s for the rest of the production run. The high-performance Durango R/T came equipped with a performance-tuned 5.9 L Magnum V8 and all-wheel drive.

For 2001, Dodge focused on interior upgrades as Durango's interior trim panels, dash-mounted controls, instrument panel, overhead console, and steering wheel were all redesigned. The transfer case selector on 4X4 models changed from a manual lever on the console to a switch on the dash. The instrument cluster was updated, and an electronic vehicle information center was incorporated into the overhead console. For improved rear passenger comfort, a dual-zone climate-control system was added as standard equipment. Sound systems were improved on all models and now came standard with six speakers. Other minor changes included door panels, revised seats, aluminum wheels, and minor changes to trim options.

In 2002, the new SXT version of the Durango was offered as the entry-level trim package. Optional side curtain airbags were added for safety. The 2003 Durango featured minor mechanical changes, most notable was the addition of four-wheel disc brakes.

In 1999, the 4WD 5.2 L V8 and the 4WD 5.9 L V8 held the best crash test results, earning a 6.8 out of 10 total rating.

=== Trim levels ===
- 1998–2003 - SLT: Most basic trim level of the Durango from 1998 to 2000. Midrange trim level of the Durango from 2001 to 2003. SLT emblem. Included: cloth upholstery, keyless entry, power doors, locks and windows, 15-inch alloy wheels, and an AM/FM stereo with cassette player and four speakers.
- 1998–2003 - SLT PLUS: Most luxurious trim level of the Durango from 1998 to 2003. Included luxury features. Based on the SLT trim level. Never featured an SLT Plus emblem, but only an SLT emblem. Added: fog lamps, floor mats for the rear seat area, leather upholstery, power driver's seat, security alarm, and an AM/FM stereo with single CD and cassette players with a graphic equalizer, Infinity sound system with 8 speakers, and steering wheel audio controls.
- 2000–2003 - Sport: More basic trim level of the Durango from 2000 to 2003. Included basic features. Based on the SXT trim level. Sport decals.
- 2000–2003 - SXT: Most basic trim level of the Durango from 2000 to 2003. Included basic features. SXT decals.
- 2000–2003 - R/T: "high-performance" trim level of the Durango from 2000 to 2003. Included luxury and performance-oriented features. Based on the SLT Plus trim level. R/T emblems.

The SLT, SLT Plus, and Sport trim levels offered the 3.9 L Magnum V6 engine as standard equipment (late availability starting in 1999), with the 5.2 L and 5.9 L Magnum V8 engines being available options, later switching to the 4.7 L Power-Tech V8 engine, with the 5.9 L Magnum V8 engine optional. The R/T and S.P. 360 trim levels included the 5.9 L Magnum V8 engine as standard equipment.

=== Engines ===
- 1998–2000 — 5.2 L (318 cu in) Magnum V8, 230 hp (172 kW) & 300 lb⋅ft (407 N⋅m) of torque
- 1998–2003 — 5.9 L (360 cu in) Magnum V8, 245 hp (183 kW) & 330 lb⋅ft (447 N⋅m) of torque
- 1999 — 3.9 L (238 cu in) Magnum V6, 175 hp (130 kW) & 225 lb⋅ft (305 N⋅m) of torque
- 1999–2000 — 5.9 L (360 cu in) Supercharged Magnum V8, 360 hp (268 kW) & 412 lb⋅ft (559 N⋅m) of torque
- 2000–2003 — 5.9 L (360 cu in) Magnum V8, 250 hp (186 kW) & 345 lb⋅ft (468 N⋅m) of torque
- 2000–2003 — 4.7 L (287 cu in) PowerTech V8, 235 hp (175 kW) & 295 lb⋅ft (400 N⋅m) of torque

=== Transmissions ===
- 42RE 4-speed TorqueFlite automatic - 3.9 L V6
- 45RFE 4-speed RFE automatic (2000–2002) - 4.7 L V8
- 545RFE 5-speed RFE automatic (2003) - 4.7 L V8
- 44RE 4-speed TorqueFlite automatic - 5.2 L V8
- 46RE 4-speed TorqueFlite automatic - 5.9 L V8

== Second generation (HB; 2004) ==
Second generation
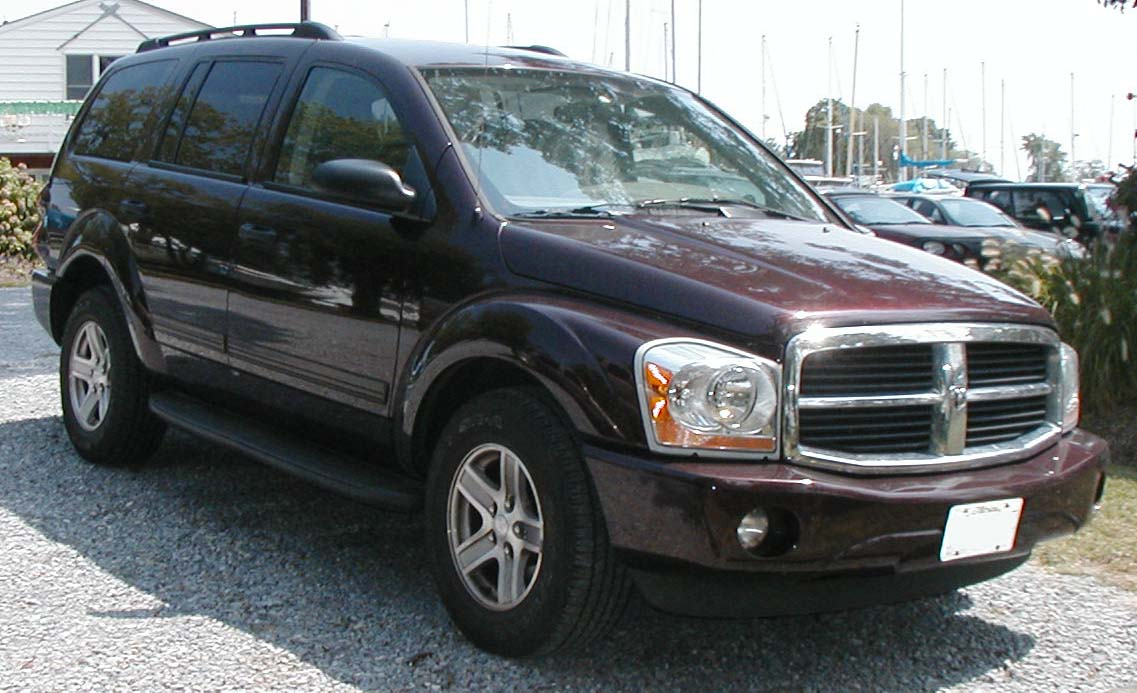

Overview
- Also called: Chrysler Aspen
- Production: September 2003–December 19, 2008
- Model years: 2004–2009
- Assembly: United States: Newark, Delaware (Newark Assembly)

Body and chassis
- Chassis: Body-on-frame
- Related: Dodge Dakota

Powertrain
- Engine: 3.7 L Magnum V6 (gasoline); 4.7 L Magnum V8 (E85 / gasoline); 5.7 L Hemi V8 (gasoline); 5.7 L Hemi Eagle V8 (Hybrid)
- Electric motor: electric motors 87 hp and 235 lb.-ft (Chrysler Aspen/Dodge Durango Hybrid)
- Transmission: 4-speed 42RLE automatic; 5-speed 545RFE automatic; CVT Two-Mode automatic

Dimensions
- Wheelbase: 119.2 in (3,028 mm)
- Length: 200.8 in (5,100 mm); Hybrid: 202.1 in (5,133 mm)
- Width: 76.0 in (1,930 mm)
- Height: 74.3 in (1,887 mm); Hybrid: 73.6 in (1,869 mm)

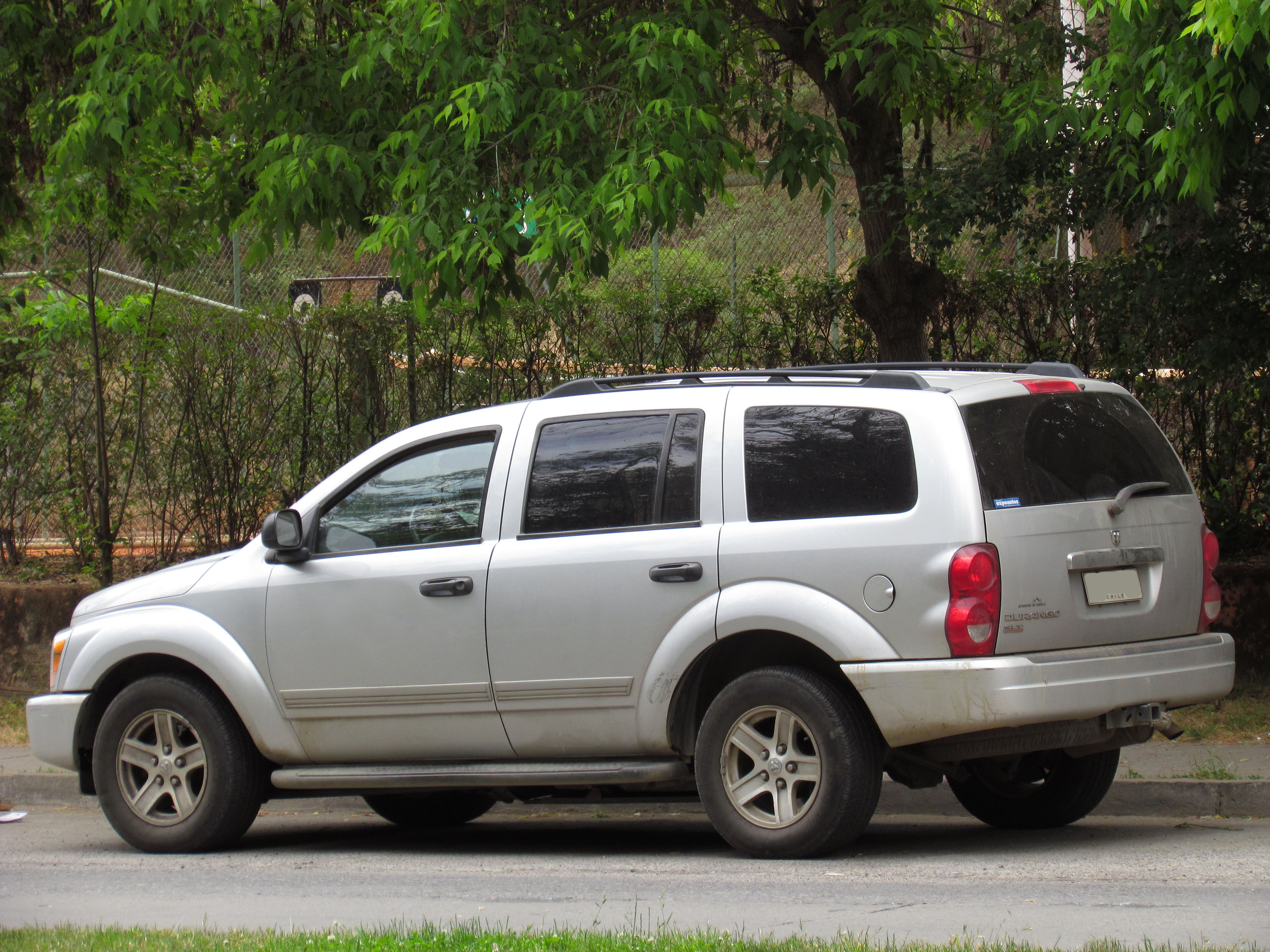
Pre–facelift Dodge Durango SLT

The second-generation Durango was first shown as a concept dubbed Dodge Durango R/T concept at the 2003 Detroit Auto Show. It debuted shortly before the companion Dakota. Like the Dakota, it has much in common with the large Dodge Ram pickup, including a fully boxed frame. It is 7 in (180 mm) longer, 2 in (51 mm) wider, and 3 in (76 mm) taller than the previous model. It also offered a third-row bench with three seats, giving it an eight-seat capacity. The design took its styling primarily from the Dodge Powerbox concept, which was itself based on the 1999 Dodge Power Wagon concept, and the 2003–2004 Durango R/T concept. The steering wheel and gauges are shared with the Dakota (2005–2011), and the steering wheel was only shared with the Ram Pickup (2004–2008).

Debuting for 2004 was a new coil-spring rear suspension for the solid rear axle. A Watt's linkage system is fitted to the rear axle, centering the axle and reducing rear-end skate over rough surfaces, and allowing a lower and wider cargo floor.

=== Trim levels ===
- ST (renamed SE later): 2005–2009: Most basic trim level, basic features. Included: cloth upholstery, 17-inch steel wheels with hubcaps, antilock brakes, keyless entry, tilt steering wheel with speed control, an AM/FM stereo with a single CD player, and air conditioning. SXT added grey running boards and an AM/FM stereo with a 6-disc CD changer with MP3 capability.
- SXT: 2004–2009: Most basic trim level, basic features.
- SLT: 2004–2009: Value-oriented trim level, value-added features, optional luxury features. Added: premium cloth upholstery, power driver's seat, 7-passenger seating, rear air conditioning, and fog lamps. SLT G package added overhead console with compass, temperature, trip odometer, average fuel economy, and distance to empty, an AM/FM stereo with 6-disc CD changer with MP3 capability, 276-watt Infinity audio system with 8-speakers, 17-inch alloy wheels, Sentry Key, security alarm, garage door opener, and dual sun visors.
- Adventurer: 2005–2007: Value-oriented and "off-road-look" trim level, value-added features, optional luxury features. Added: V8 engine, 17-inch alloy wheels, rear cargo organizer, and floor mats.
- Limited: 2004–2009: Most luxurious trim level, luxury features. Added: leather upholstery, power-adjustable pedals, auto-dimming rearview mirror, an AM/FM stereo with 6-disc CD changer with MP3 capability, a 378-watt Infinity sound system with 8 speakers and subwoofer, a memory system for driver's seat, mirrors, stereo, and pedals, automatic headlamps, automatic temp control, power mirrors, and leather-wrapped steering wheel with audio and speed controls.

All trim levels offered the 4.7 L Power-Tech V8 engine as standard equipment, though the 5.7 L Hemi V8 engine was available on all trim levels, except for the base SXT trim level. The base SXT trim level also offered the 3.7 L Power-Tech V6 engine as standard equipment in place of the 5.7 L Hemi V8 engine option, though the V6 engine option was only available on the base SXT trim level, and only between 2004 and 2007.

The 2004 Dodge Durango was the first SUV in DaimlerChrysler's lineup to introduce the 5.7 L Hemi V8 engine, as well as a new radio design and modernized interior features.

=== Facelift ===
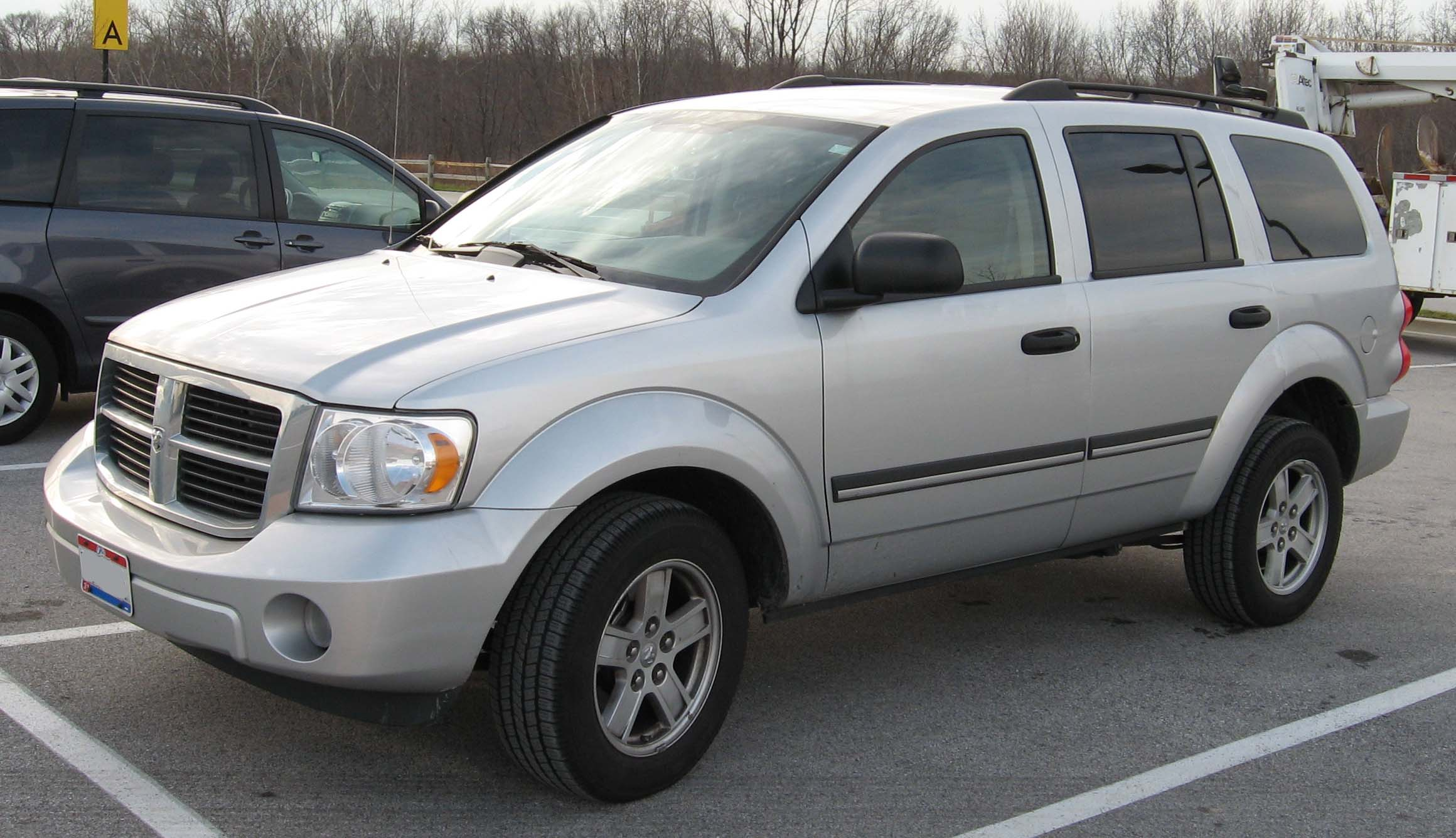
2007–2009 Dodge Durango

The 2007 model year featured a facelift that debuted at the Dallas Auto Show in April 2006. It featured a redesigned grille, hood, headlamps, fenders, and wheels. New features included electronic stability control, rear park assist, and a one-touch turn signal.

In 2006, DaimlerChrysler introduced a full-size luxury SUV based on the Durango, called the Chrysler Aspen, for the 2007 model year.

=== Engines ===
- 2004–2009 - 3.7 L (226 cu in) Magnum V6, 210 hp (157 kW) at 5200 rpm and 235 lb⋅ft (319 N⋅m) at 4000 rpm.
- 2004–2007 - 4.7 L (287 cu in) Magnum V8, 235 hp (175 kW) at 4500 rpm and 300 lb⋅ft (407 N⋅m) at 3600 rpm
- 2008–2009 - 4.7 L (287 cu in) Corsair V8, 303 hp (226 kW) at 5,650 rpm and 330 lb⋅ft (447 N⋅m) at 3,950 rpm
- 2004–2008 - 5.7 L (345 cu in) Hemi V8, 335 hp (250 kW) at 5200 rpm and 370 lb⋅ft (502 N⋅m) at 4200 rpm (MDS equipped for 2006+ 5.7 L engines for improved fuel mileage)
- 2009 - 5.7 L (345 cu in) Hemi V8, 376 hp (280 kW) at 5200 rpm and 401 lb⋅ft (544 N⋅m)
- 2009 Hybrid - 5.7 L (345 cu in) Hemi V8, 360 hp (270 kW) at 5200 rpm and 390 lb⋅ft (529 N⋅m), Electric Motors: 87 hp (65 kW) and 235 lb⋅ft (319 N⋅m), Combined: 390 hp (290 kW) at 5300 rpm and 499 lb⋅ft (677 N⋅m) at 2500 rpm

=== Hybrid ===
For 2009, a hybrid variant of the Dodge Durango and its brother, the Chrysler Aspen, was introduced, This system used the GM-designed two-stage hybrid system and added two 87 hp electric motors to the 5.7L V8 with a total system output of around 400 horsepower. All Durango and Aspen hybrids came standard with 4-wheel drive. The whole hybrid setup increased the weight of the car by 400 pounds (180 kg) and cost an additional $4,000 over the standard 5.7L Durango/Aspen. The fuel economy for the Durango/Aspen hybrid was improved to 19 miles per gallon in the city, and 20 on the highway, increased from the Hemi's 13 city, 18 highway. But, two months after the car debuted, Chrysler discontinued the hybrid, citing demand had dropped for their full size SUVs due to economic slowdown. They also announced the shutting down of Newark Assembly plant where the hybrid versions were made. Estimated overall production figures for the Durango and Aspen hybrid is around 800 cars.

=== Chrysler Aspen ===
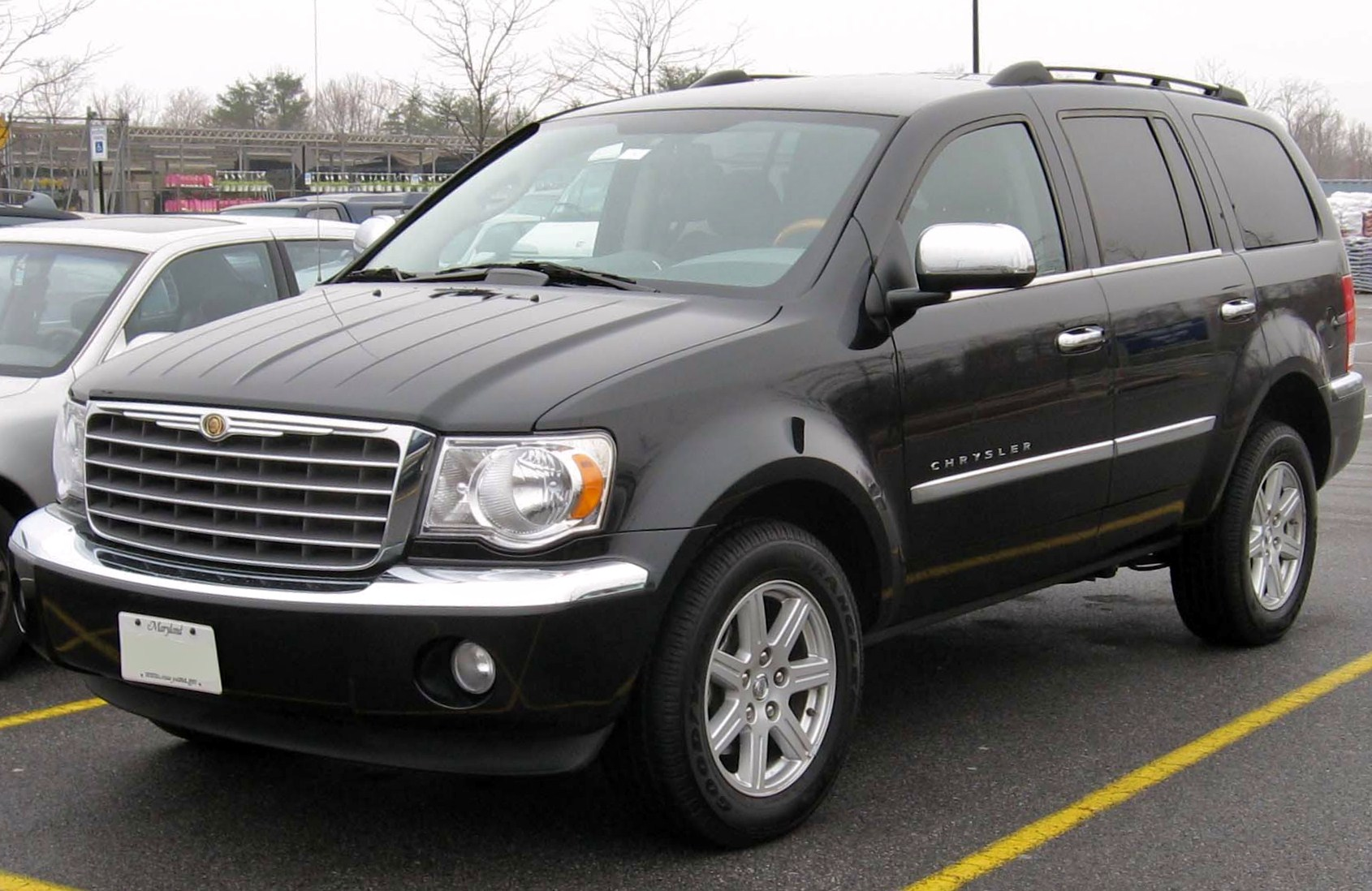
Chrysler Aspen

The Chrysler Aspen is a luxury SUV from Chrysler. Launched for the 2007 model year, the Aspen was based on the second generation Durango.

The Aspen was the first truck-based SUV commercialized under the Chrysler brand, although the PT Cruiser was the first truck-based Chrysler brand vehicle as classified under Corporate Average Fuel Economy's (CAFE) regulation. With this introduction, as of 2007, all American automobile brands had an SUV in their range. The Aspen was unveiled at the 2005 North American International Auto Show. It came equipped with three rows of seating for eight passengers and available all-wheel drive, and was only available in one single trim, Limited.

The vehicle appears in the 2006 film Deck the Halls and game The Movies: Stunts and Effects released the same year.

Partly due to slow sales, but mostly because the Chrysler-Dodge-Jeep network of dealers merged, it was discontinued after the 2009 model year. However, the Dodge Durango Citadel covers the mid-size luxury SUV segment as of 2011.

=== Discontinuation ===
In October 2008, Chrysler announced that the shutdown of the Newark Assembly facility, which produced the Durango and the Chrysler Aspen, would be moved up to the end of 2008, thereby ending production of the Aspen and Durango after the 2009 model year. Production ceased on December 19, 2008.

== Third generation (WD; 2011) ==
Third generation
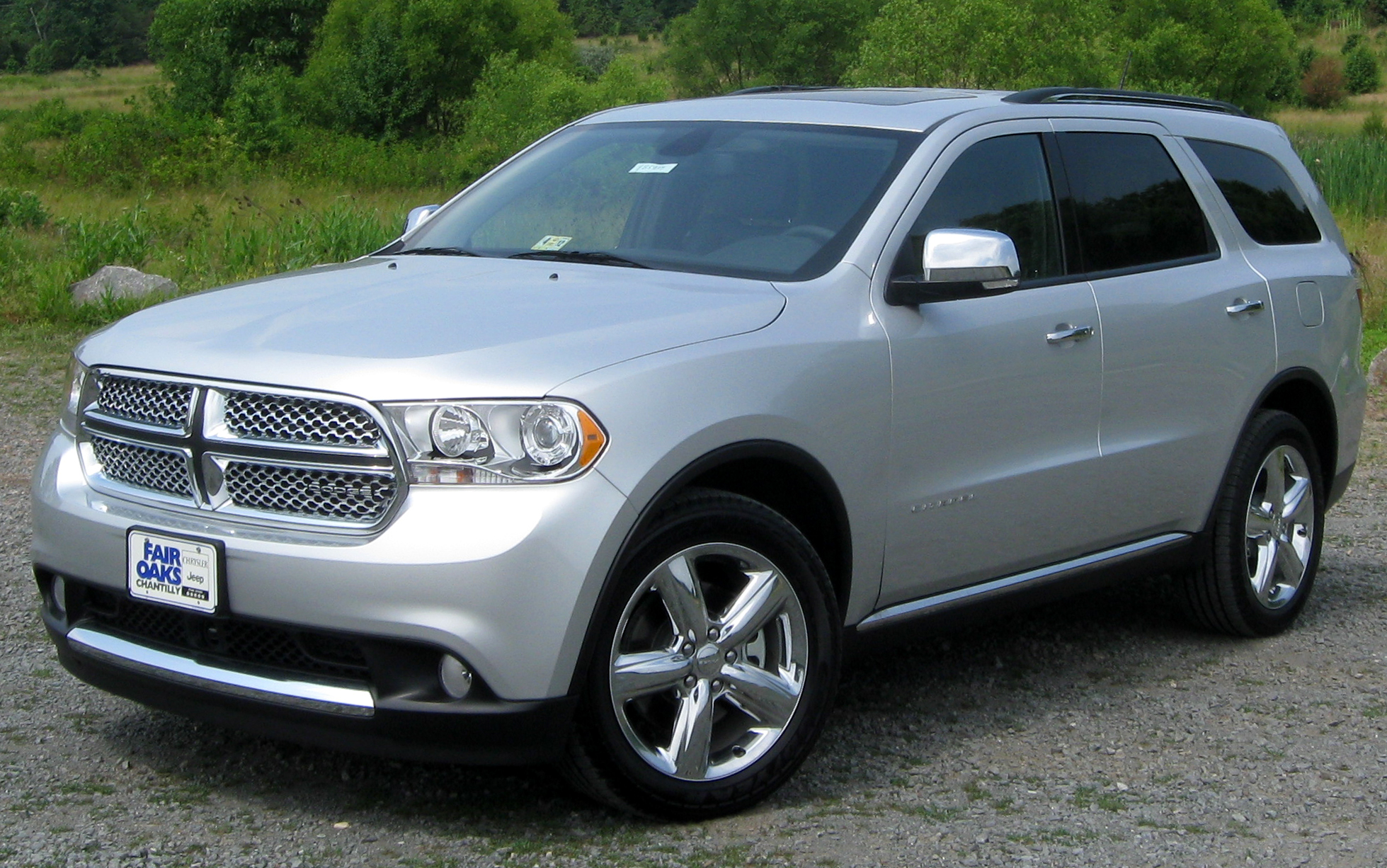

Overview
- Production: 2010–present
- Model years: 2011–present
- Assembly: United States: Detroit, Michigan (Jefferson North Assembly)
- Designer: Mark T. Allen and Don Renkert

Body and chassis
- Platform: Chrysler WK/WK2
- Chassis: Unibody
- Related: Jeep Grand Cherokee (WK2)

Powertrain
- Engine: 3.6 L Pentastar V6; 5.7 L Hemi V8; 6.4 L Hemi 392 V8; 6.2 L SRT Hellcat supercharged V8
- Transmission: 5-speed W5A580 automatic; 5-speed 545RFE automatic; 6-speed 65RFE automatic; 8-speed 845RE automatic (2014-17 Pentastar 2018-on 850RE ); 8-speed 8HP70 automatic (2014-24 Hemi); 8-speed 8HP95 automatic (2021, 2023-26 Hellcat)

Dimensions
- Wheelbase: 119.9 in (3,045 mm)
- Length: 199.8 in (5,075 mm)
- Width: 75.8 in (1,925 mm)
- Height: 70.9 in (1,801 mm)

=== Overview ===
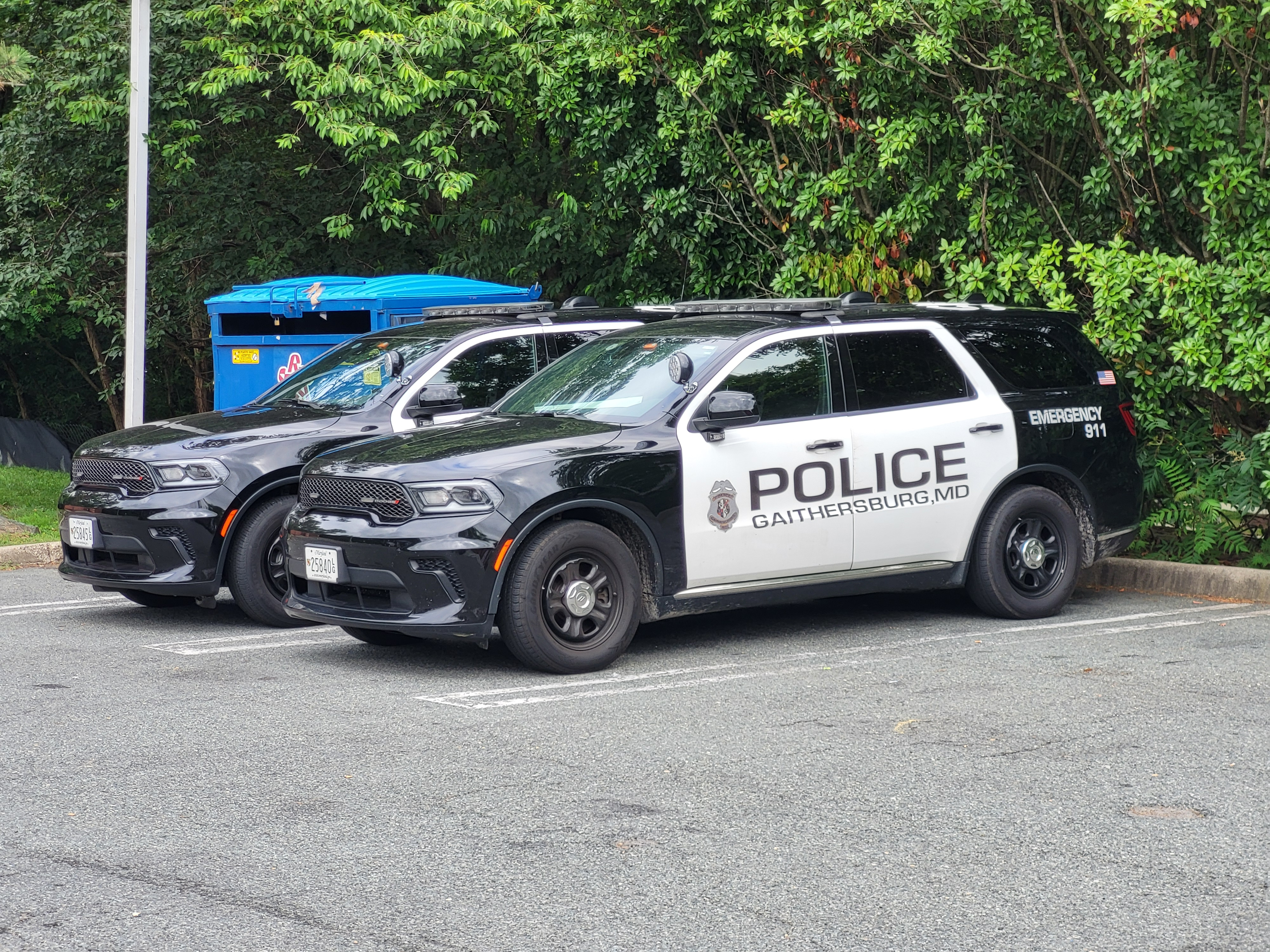
Dodge Durango Pursuit variant in service with the Gaithersburg Police Department in Maryland.

After announcing the discontinuation of the Durango after the 2009 model year, Dodge released an Internet site and teaser photos of the third-generation Dodge Durango on August 16, 2010.

The 2011 Dodge Durango entered production on December 14, 2010, alongside the second-generation Charger in the 2011 vehicle lineup. It went on sale for general dealership availability in mid-January 2011.

The third-generation Durango is built alongside the Jeep Grand Cherokee at the Jefferson North Assembly Plant in Detroit, Michigan, sharing the assembly line, running gear, powertrains, and chassis parts with the Grand Cherokee. With a slightly longer wheelbase than the Grand Cherokee, the Durango features three rows of seating.

=== Trim levels ===
The third generation Durango has been available in several trim levels:

- Express - 2011 only: Base trim level, base features, 3.6 L Pentastar V6 engine only.
- Crew - 2011-2013: Value-added trim level, added features, optional luxury features, 3.6 L Pentastar V6 and 5.7 L Hemi V8 engines.
- SXT - 2012–present: Base trim level, base features, 3.6 L Pentastar V6 engine only.
- SXT Plus - 2014–present: Basic trim level, basic features, 3.6 L Pentastar V6 engine only.
- Crew Plus - 2011-2013: Luxury trim level, luxury features, 3.6 L Pentastar V6 or 5.7 L Hemi V8 engines.
- Limited - 2014–2016: Luxury trim level, luxury features, 3.6 L Pentastar V6 or 5.7 L Hemi V8 engines.
- GT - 2017–present: Sporty trim level that replaces the Limited trim, 3.6 L Pentastar V6 engine only.
- GT Plus - 2019–present: GT trim with selected luxury amenities, 3.6 L Pentastar V6 engine only.
- R/T - 2011–2025 (2026-present, 6.4 L V8): Sporty trim level, sporty details, 5.7 L HEMI V8 (2011-2025) 6.4 L 392 HEMI V8 (2026-present). First, return to the Dodge Durango lineup since 2001.
- Citadel - 2011– 2024: Highest trim level, luxurious features, 3.6 L Pentastar V6 or 5.7 L Hemi V8 engines.
- Pursuit - 2018–Present, Police Model, V6-AWD and V8-AWD.
- SRT 392 - 2018–2024: High performance trim level; 6.4 L Hemi V8 engine only.
- SRT Hellcat - 2021–present: High performance trim level; 6.2 L supercharged Hemi V8 engine only
- Special Service Package (e.g., for police vehicles) was available from 2012

=== Engines ===
The third-generation Durango features four engines. The base engine is a new 3.6-liter V6 engine producing 290 hp (216 kW; 294 PS) and 260 lb⋅ft (353 N⋅m; 36 kg⋅m) of torque at 4,800 rpm; 90% of peak torque is available from 1,600 to 6,400 rpm. The Pentastar V6 engine is backed by a Mercedes W5A580 five-speed automatic, with Chrysler's controls and the driver-interactive control. Since 2014, Dodge had exclusively used the ZF eight-speed gearbox in two versions in the Durango. All V8's have the ZF 8HP, with all V6s using the Chrysler-built 850re version of the ZF 8HP. The 5.7-liter Hemi VVT V8 returned with 360 hp (268 kW; 365 PS) and 390 lb⋅ft (529 N⋅m; 54 kg⋅m) of torque, which features the 545RFE five-speed automatic. The Hemi V8 also comes with a "fuel-saver" (cylinder deactivation) mode. This feature is primarily used when the vehicle is cruising at constant speeds on level ground. In 2021, a supercharged 6.2-liter Hemi V8 was introduced for the SRT Hellcat trim level. The supercharged 6.2 L Hemi V8 along with the Durango SRT Hellcat trim level was discontinued for the 2022 model year as the engine was unable to be modified further to comply with more stringent automotive emissions requirements. However, emissions changes were adopted for the 2023 model year that allowed the SRT Hellcat trim to return. The 6.4-liter Hemi returned for the 2026 model year in the R/T 392 model.

Engine	Displacement	Power @ rpm	Torque @ rpm	Years	Note
3.6 L V6 Pentastar	3,604 cc (219.9 cu in)	290 hp (216 kW; 294 PS) @ 6400 rpm	350 N⋅m (258 lb⋅ft; 36 kg⋅m) @ 4800 rpm	2010–Present	Normal V6
5.7 L V8 Hemi	5,654 cc (345.0 cu in)	360 hp (268 kW; 365 PS) @ 5150 rpm	530 N⋅m (391 lb⋅ft; 54 kg⋅m) @ 4250 rpm	2011–Present	MDS
6.4 L V8 Hemi	6,417 cc (391.6 cu in)	475 hp (354 kW; 482 PS) @ 6000 rpm	637 N⋅m (470 lb⋅ft; 65 kg⋅m) @ 4300 rpm	2018–2024 2026–present	SRT 392, R/T 392
6.2 L V8-S Hemi	6,166 cc (376.3 cu in)	710 hp (529 kW; 720 PS) @ 6000 rpm	875 N⋅m (645 lb⋅ft; 89 kg⋅m) @ 4000 rpm	2021, 2023–present	SRT Hellcat

=== Updates ===
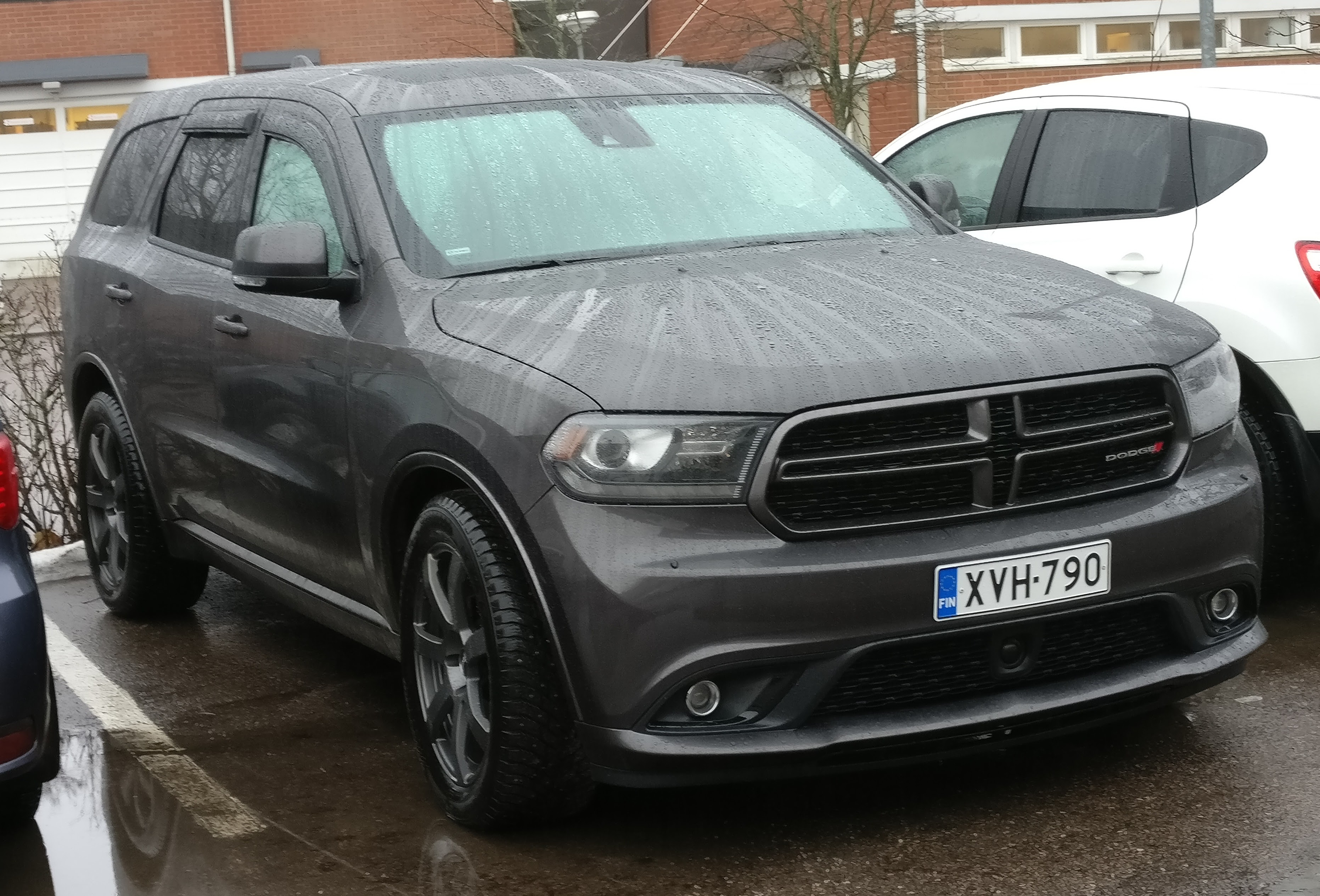
Refreshed headlights and grille for 2014

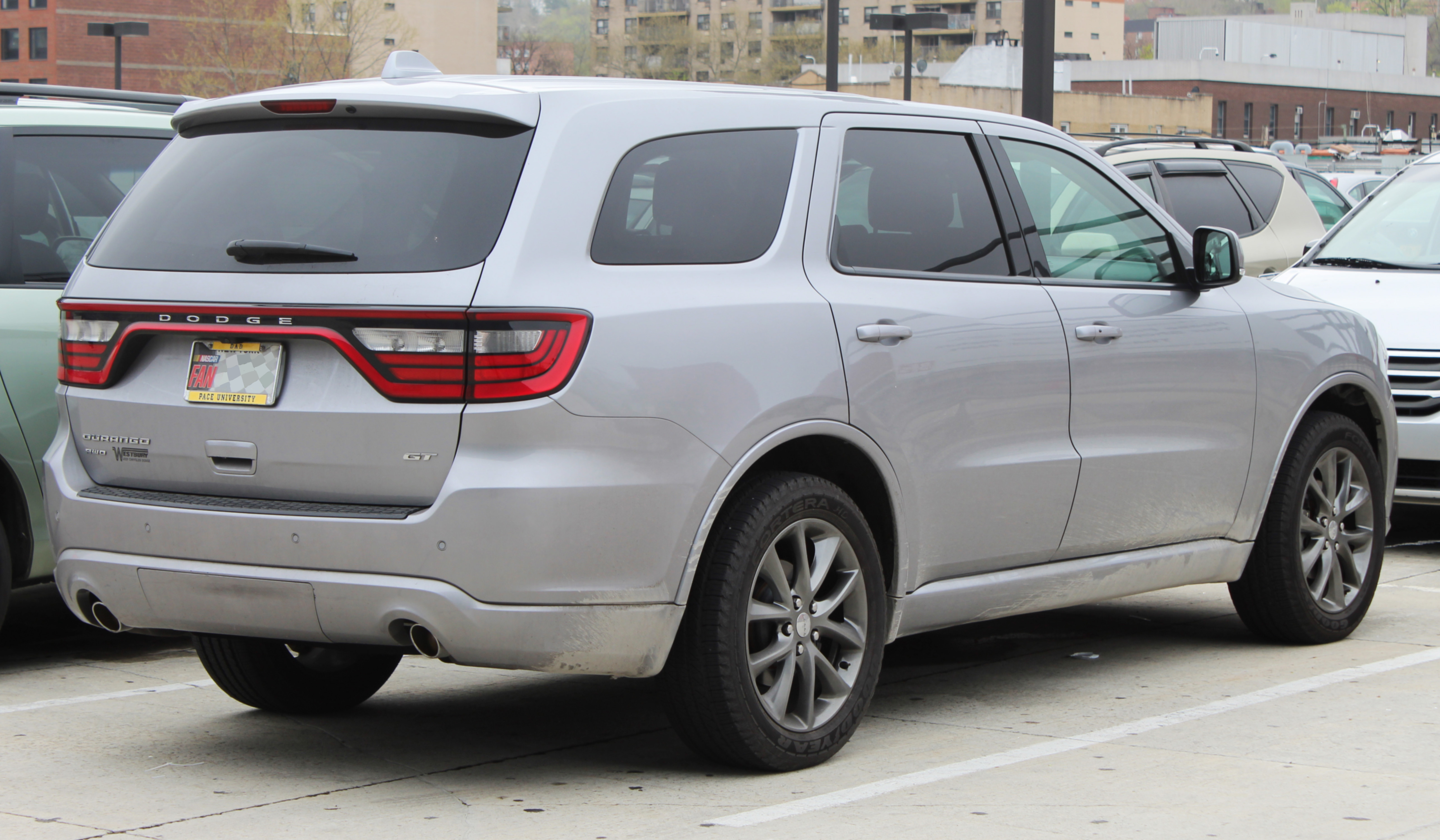
The rear of a post-facelift Dodge Durango.

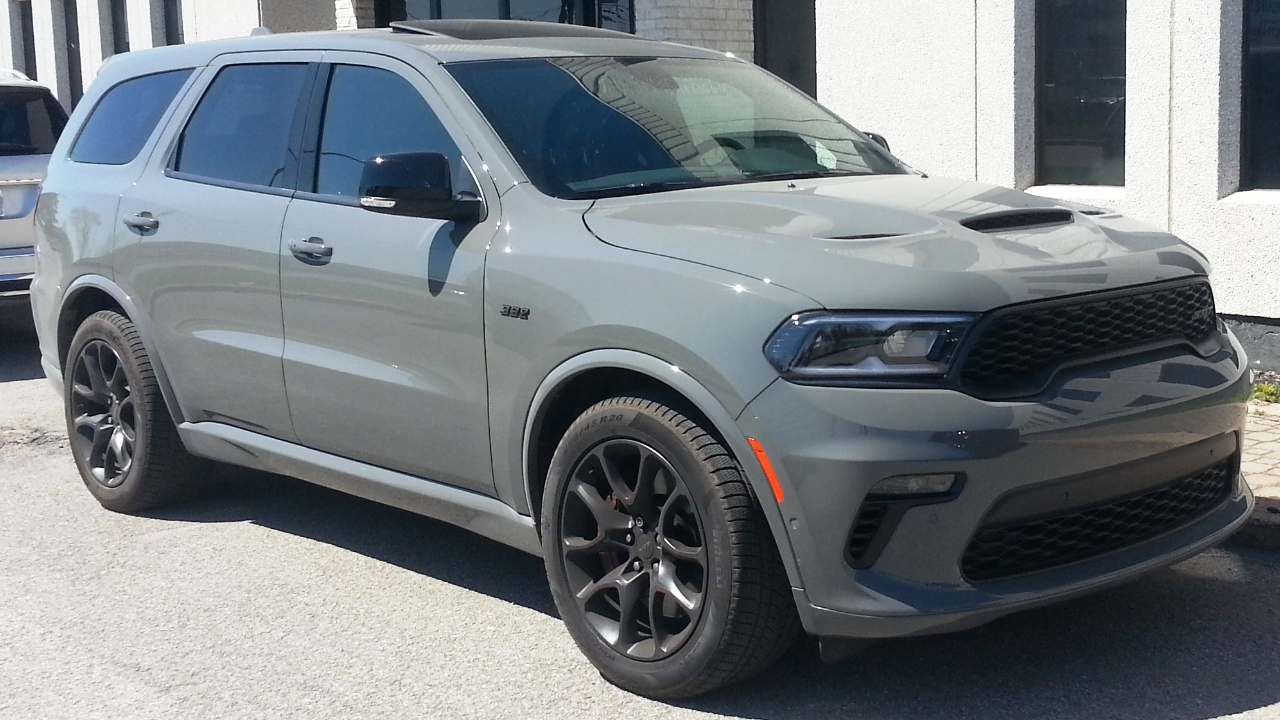
Front-right quarter of the 2021 Durango SRT 392

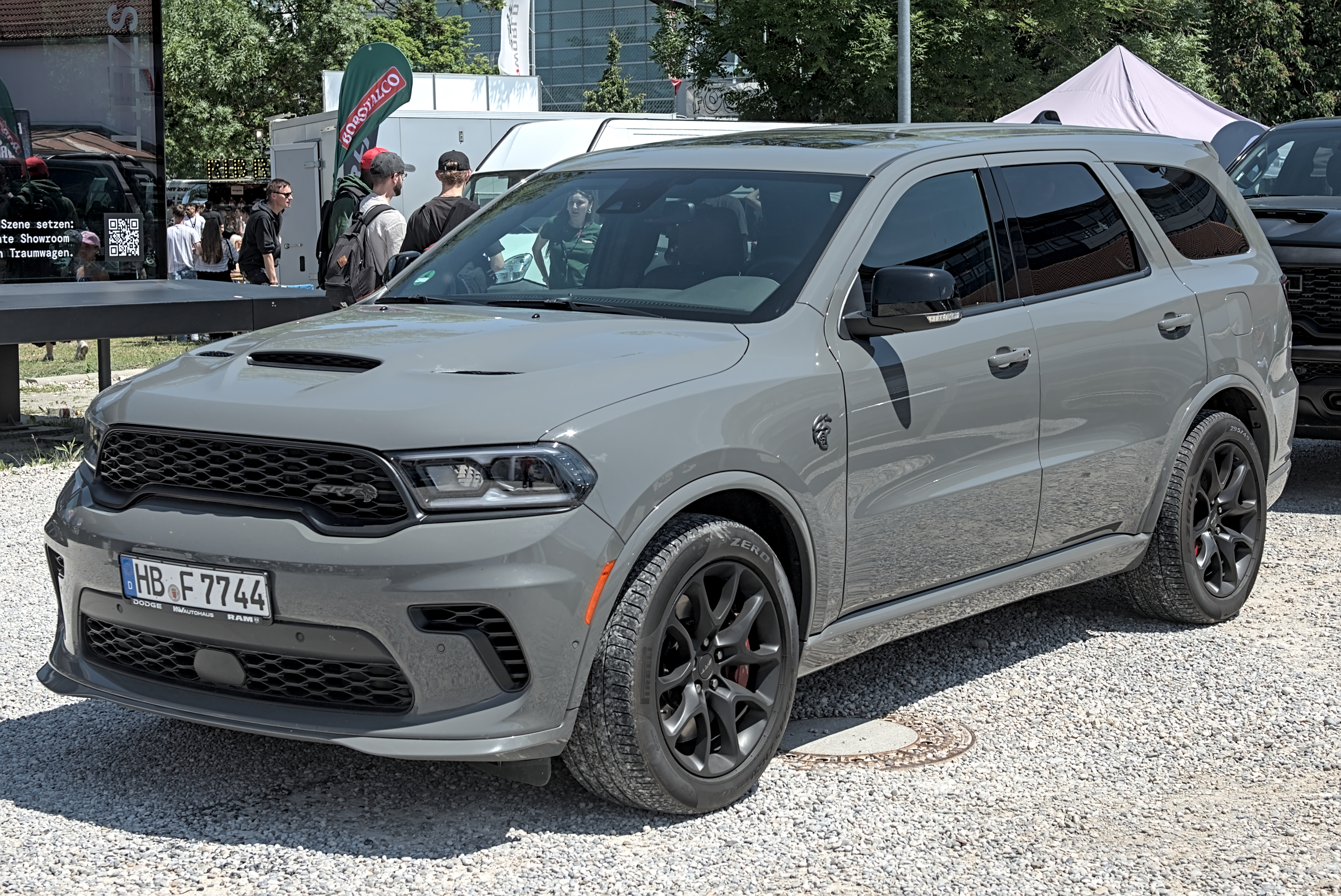
Dodge Durango SRT Hellcat

Dodge unveiled its revised 2014 model Durango at the 2013 New York International Auto Show. The 2014 Durango was redesigned with sportier-looking lines, an eight-speed automatic transmission, and a new design trim similar to the Rallye, with a blackened plastic bumper and outline. The taillights were reworked to feature a single LED 'Racetrack' tail lamp similar to the Charger and Dart. On the inside, Dodge added a revised steering wheel, instrument cluster, rotary shift knob, and a reconfigurable 20 in (510 mm) thin film transistor display first seen on the Dart.

The 2015 Durango received a new package available for the R/T trim, consisting of a Premium Nappa Leather Group option featuring radar red leather seats, 0.8-inch-lower ride height (20 mm), black headlamp bezels, HID low beams and LED DRL'S, optional R/T embroidery on the seats, a nine-speaker sound system with a subwoofer, a 360 hp (268 kW; 365 PS) 5.7 L Hemi paired with ZF's eight-speed transmission, and a 20-inch (510 mm) Granite Crystal wheel finished in black.

For 2016 the Durango received the Pentastar Upgrade V6 which adds Stop/Start, Variable Valve Lift and better engine refinement through a 15% enhanced torque curve and increasing the Variable Valve Timing from 50 degrees to 70 degrees. Other technologies include Cooled EGR and friction reduction. Despite the added tech, the engine weighs 4 pounds (1.8 kg) less. Power output and torque remain the same at 293 horsepower (218 kW; 297 PS) and 260 pound-feet (353 N⋅m; 36 kg⋅m) (single exhaust) or 295 horsepower (220 kW; 299 PS) and 260 pound-feet (353 N⋅m; 36 kg⋅m) torque (dual exhaust). The Durango also added new packages to its two trims, with the Anodized Platinum package for the Citadel trim and the Brass Monkey package for the Limited trim.

For 2017, the Dodge Durango Limited trim was discontinued and replaced by the new GT trim and the Base SXT trim level will now be available with three-row seating fitting seven passengers.

For 2018, all models received the new Uconnect radios and the second-generation ZF 8-speed automatic transmission. The rotary transmission gear shifter has been replaced with a T-grip handle like in the Dodge Charger. The steering wheel has also been changed to a more sporty wheel like found in the Dodge Charger. Other changes include suede insert leather seats and black chrome inserts in the interior on the GT model.

For 2019: The Tow Group IV package gets an integrated trailer brake controller. The Dodge Durango GT trim gets the R/T- and SRT-style grille. A new GT Plus trim is added which adds several amenities to the GT trim, such as heated front and second-row seats and steering wheel; 6-way passenger power seat with 4-way lumbar adjustment; two-position memory for the driver's seat, radio, and mirrors; a power liftgate; and 150W inverter.

For 2021, the Durango receives updated exterior styling, with a revised bumper and headlights, three grille textures, and six new wheel designs. The interior features a new instrument panel with Uconnect 5; an 8.4-inch screen is standard on SXT and GT models, while R/T and Citadel models have a 10.1-inch touchscreen. An SRT Hellcat model with a 710 hp supercharged 6.2 L Hemi V8 was available for 2021 only, after which it was discontinued due to emissions requirements. With the discontinuation of the smaller Journey, the Durango becomes the only SUV in the Dodge vehicle lineup as of 2021. In 2023, the Dodge Hornet was introduced making the Durango the largest vehicle in the Dodge lineup.

For 2023, Dodge restructured the entire Durango lineup, dividing each individual model into three different trim levels: "Base" (without an additional trim level designation), "Plus", and "Premium" (the latter available on GT models and above). A new "HEMI Orange Edition" R/T model, based on the R/T Premium trim, adds an asymmetrical HEMI Orange accent strip on the front hood of the vehicle, as well as a HEMI Orange-accented Dodge emblem on the front grille, HEMI orange-painted brake calipers (only when equipped with the R/T HEMI Orange Tow N Go Package), dark exterior accents, and HEMI orange stitching on the interior. Due to the restructuring of the trim lineup, there are now fewer available options and package on each model, as the previously-available options and packages are now consolidated into the three trim levels. The SXT Plus now carries a lower Manufacturer's Suggested Retail Price (MSRP) than the base SXT, starting $450 less at $40,140 versus $40,590. SXT, SXT Plus, and GT are now the only trims of the Durango lineup to feature the standard U Connect 5 8.4 infotainment system, as all other trims now feature the upgraded U Connect 5 10.1 infotainment system as standard equipment.

=== Safety ===
==== NHTSA ====
NHTSA 2018 Durango
Overall	4/5 stars
Frontal driver	4/5 stars
Frontal Passenger	5/5 stars
Side Driver	5/5 stars
Side Passenger	5/5 stars
Side Pole Driver	5/5 stars
Rollover RWD	4/5 stars
Rollover AWD	3/5 stars

==== IIHS ====
IIHS 2017-20 Durango
Small overlap front (Driver):	Marginal	
Moderate overlap front	Good	
Side (original test)	Good	
Roof strength	Good	
Head restraints & seats	Good	
Headlights	Marginal	
Front crash prevention (Vehicle-to-Vehicle)	Superior	optional
Child seat anchors (LATCH) ease of use	Acceptable	

=== Recalls ===
On August 16, 2012, Chrysler recalled 1,661 2013-model Dodge Durango sport utility vehicles in the United States and Canada because some airbags may not deploy in an accident. The recall affects 1,449 of the seven-passenger versions of the SUVs in the United States and 212 in Canada and other markets.

On July 24, 2015, Chrysler recalled all 2014-2015 Dodge Durangos with the 8.4-inch (210 mm) touch-screens due to security concerns with the software that controls the vehicle because it could be hacked. The vulnerability was discovered by software engineers Charlie Miller and Chris Valasek and initially posted on Wired. This vulnerability would allow hackers to remotely access and take over a variety of features, including those key parts of driving via a vulnerability in the Uconnect infotainment system.

On November 26, 2019, Chrysler issued a recall of 700,000 2011-2013 Durangos and Jeep Grand Cherokees in the United States, Canada, and Mexico, because of an electrical failure that can cause the engine not to start or stop functioning while it is driving. There are no reports of accidents. The FCA group announced a free revision to both models and replacement of these pieces involved in the problem.

== Total sales ==
=== Dodge Durango sales ===
Calendar year	USA	Canada	Mexico	Europe
1997	20,263			
1998	156,923			
1999	189,840			
2000	173,567			197
2001	130,799			94
2002	106,925			53
2003	108,010			32
2004	137,148	6,394		
2005	115,439	4,310	3,831	
2006	70,606	3,836	3,480	
2007	45,503	1,634	2,880	
2008	21,420	1,115	2,074	
2009	3,521	97	582	
2010	572	6	2	
2011	51,697	2,549	1,345	84
2012	42,589	2,398	1,361	346
2013	60,727	2,045	1,128	258
2014	64,398	2,977	1,151	492
2015	64,186	3,659	1,185	210
2016	68,474	6,266	827	171
2017	68,761	6,505	370	212
2018	65,947	6,951	352	563
2019	67,599	9,220	291	616
2020	57,828	5,668	360	
2021	65,936	5,764	607	424
2022	55,433	7,765	836	226
2023	69,196	7,739		
2024	59,357	9,384		
2025	81,168	8,206		
Subtotal sales	2,211,460	102,003	21,190	3,978
Total sales	2,338,631			

=== Chrysler Aspen sales ===
Calendar year	United States	Mexico
2006	7,656	256
2007	28,788	982
2008	22,254	772
2009	5,996	245
2010	30	4
Subtotal sales	64,724	2,259
Total sales	66,983	
