= Dodge Powerbox =

Concept car developed by Dodge

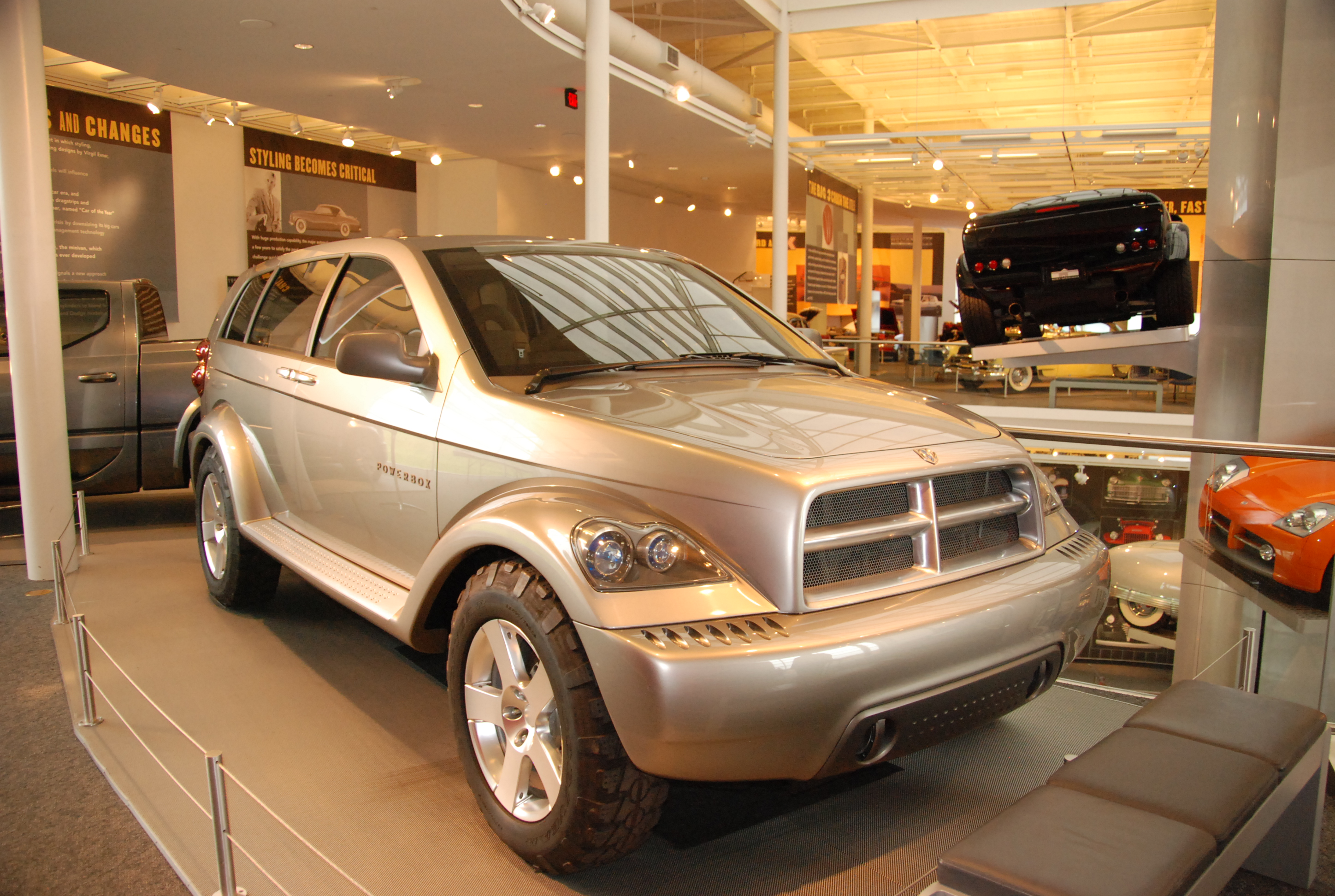

Overview
- Manufacturer: Dodge (Chrysler)
- Production: 2001

Body and chassis
- Body style: 5-door SUV
- Layout: FR layout
- Doors: Conventional doors (front); Swing-slide door (rear)

Powertrain
- Engine: 2.7L LH supercharged V6, 250 hp + compressed natural gas (CNG) fuel
- Electric motor: 70 hp Siemens electric motor
- Battery: Li-ion

The Dodge Powerbox was a concept car created by Dodge. It was first introduced at the 2001 Los Angeles International Auto Show. The Powerbox demonstrated DaimlerChrysler's attempt in trying to improve hybrid automobiles.

The Powerbox used a supercharged V6 engine that ran on compressed natural gas (CNG) in addition to an electric motor that boosted the acceleration of the Powerbox. The Powerbox could go from 0 to 60 mph (0 to 97 km/h) in about seven seconds. The top speed of the Powerbox was 120 mph (193.1 km/h).

Some of the Powerbox's styling would be seen in the second-generation Durango, introduced in 2004.
