= Rockville City Police Department =

Coordinates: 39°4′53″N 77°9′6″W

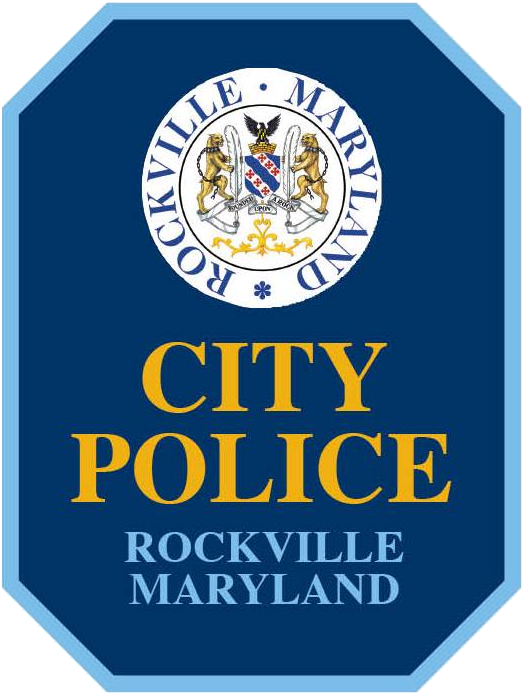
- Current patch of the RCPD, in use since the late 1990s

- Badge of a Rockville City Police Department Corporal
- Common name: Rockville Police Department
- Abbreviation: RCPD
- Motto: "If You See Something, Say Something!"

Agency overview
- Employees: 92
- Annual budget: $12,624,380 (in 2017)

Jurisdictional structure
- Operations jurisdiction: U.S.
- Legal jurisdiction: Rockville, Maryland, U.S.

Operational structure
- Headquarters: 2 West Montgomery Avenue, Rockville, Maryland, U.S.
- Sworn officers: 77 (approved as of 2024)
- Unsworn civilians: 33 (as of 2016)
- Agency executive: Jason West, Chief of Police

Facilities
- Cars: Ford Police Interceptor Sedan, Dodge Charger, Chevy Impala
- SUVs: Chevy Tahoe and Ford Police Interceptor Utility

Website
- http://www.rockvillemd.gov/index.aspx?nid=248

The Rockville City Police Department (RCPD) is a U.S. law enforcement agency responsible for patrolling the city of Rockville, the fourth largest city in the U.S. state of Maryland. The RCPD patrols the city in cooperation with the Montgomery County Police Department (MCPD). The agency serves a jurisdiction consisting of over 65,000 people and has been a CALEA-accredited agency since 1994. According to the RCPD, its mission is to protect and promote community safety, ensure the safe and orderly movement of traffic, and seek solutions to any problem that creates fear or threatens the quality of life in its jurisdiction.

== History ==
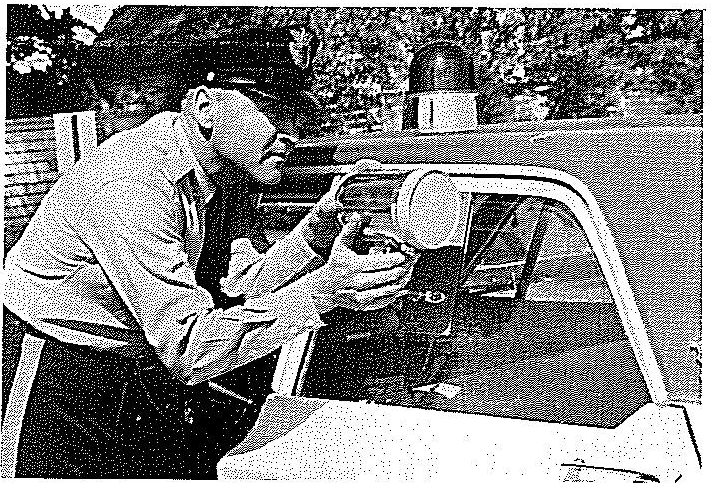
Lieutenant Walter Kent Atwell of the RCPD in 1963

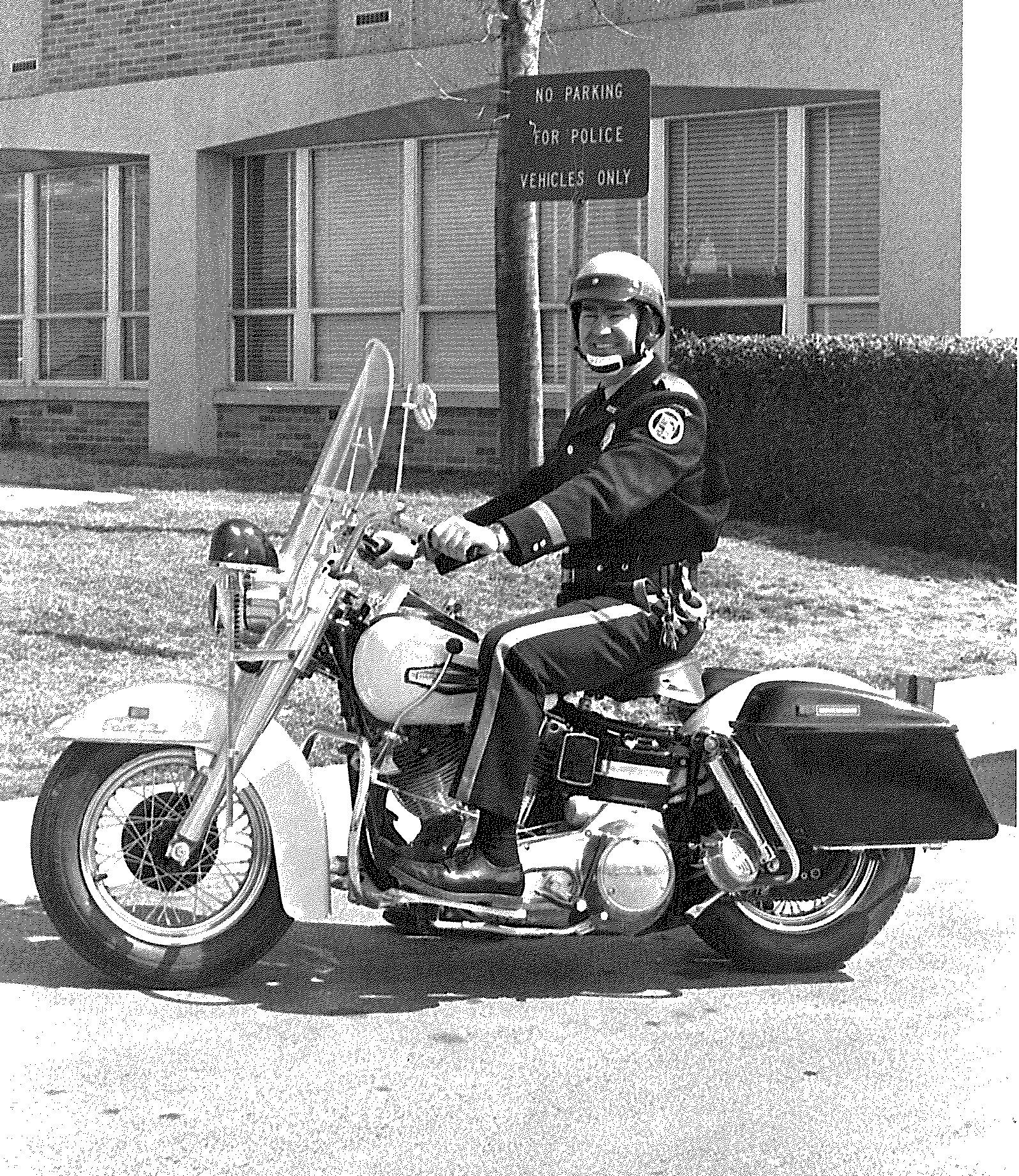
Vintage RCPD motorcycle unit, circa late 1960s/early 1970s

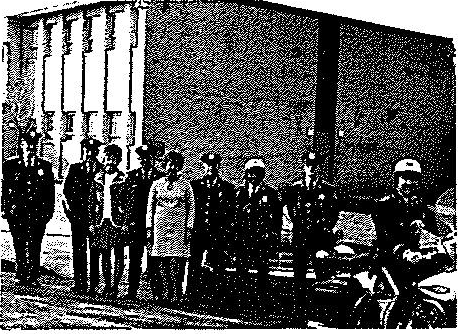
The entire RCPD in 1972

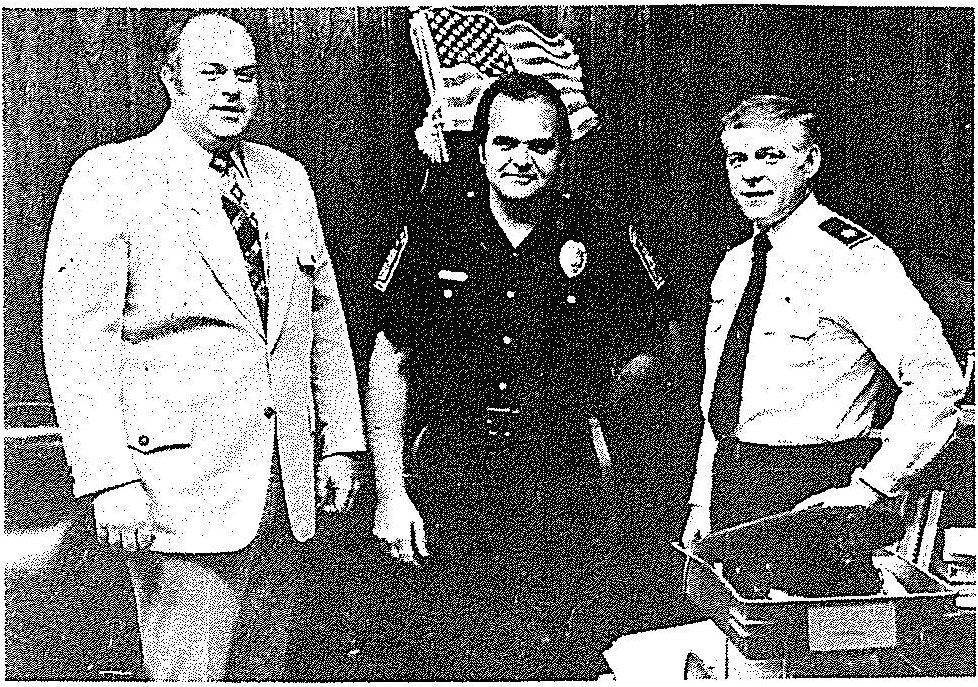
An RCPD captain and a USAF colonel in 1976

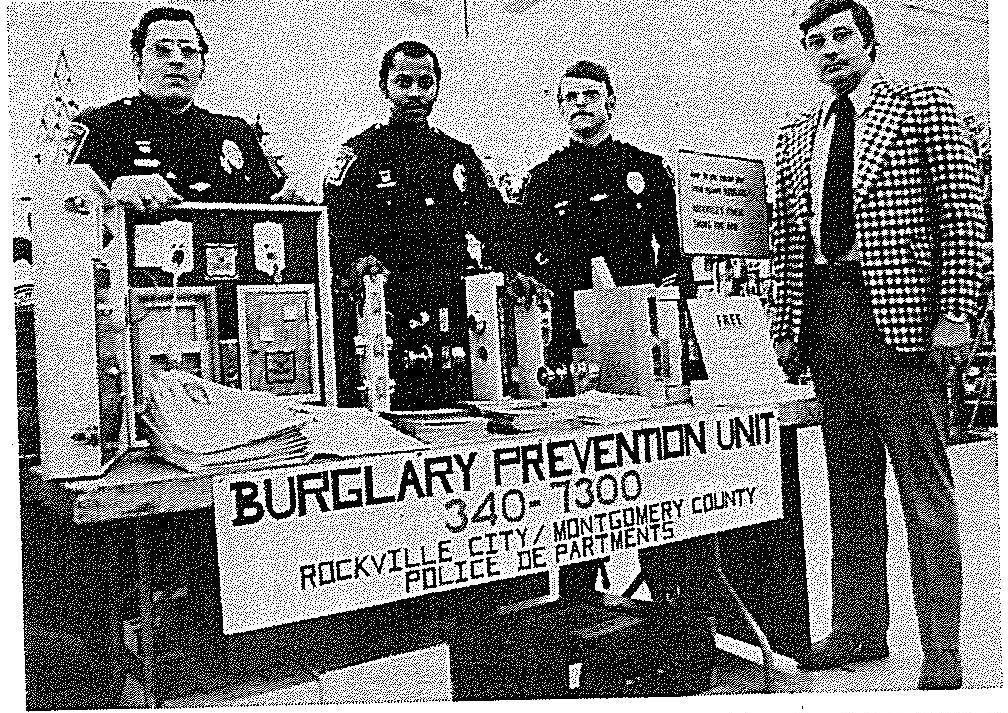
The RCPD's burglary prevention unit and an MCPD sergeant in 1976

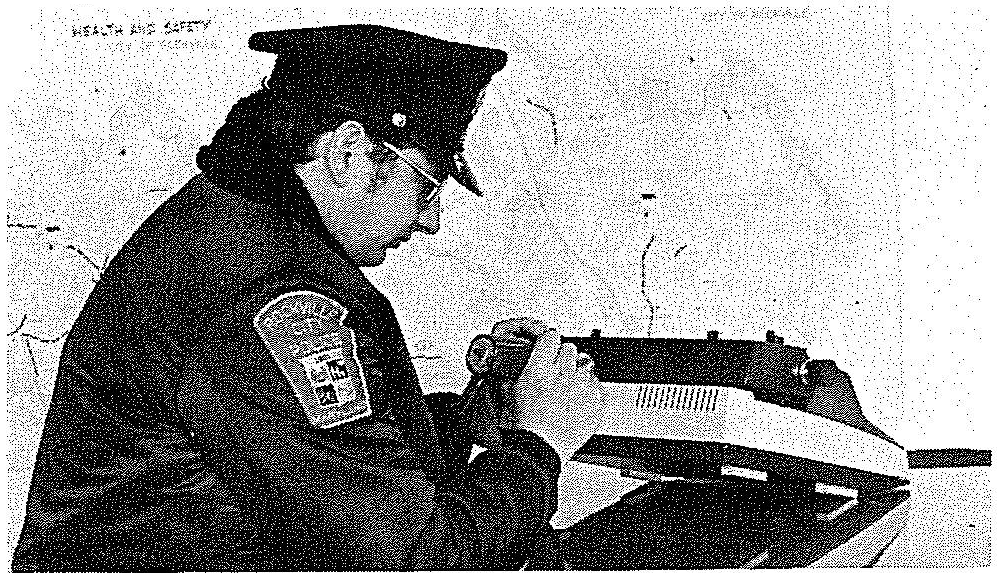
An RCPD policeman in 1977

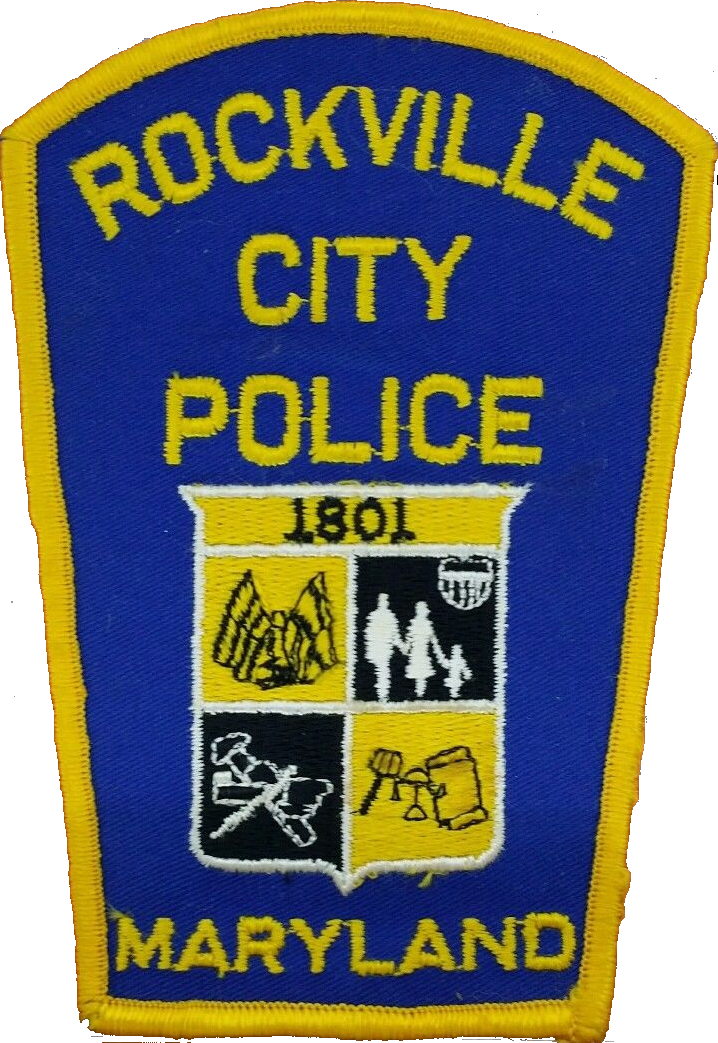
Former patch of the RCPD, used during the late 1970s and early 1980s.

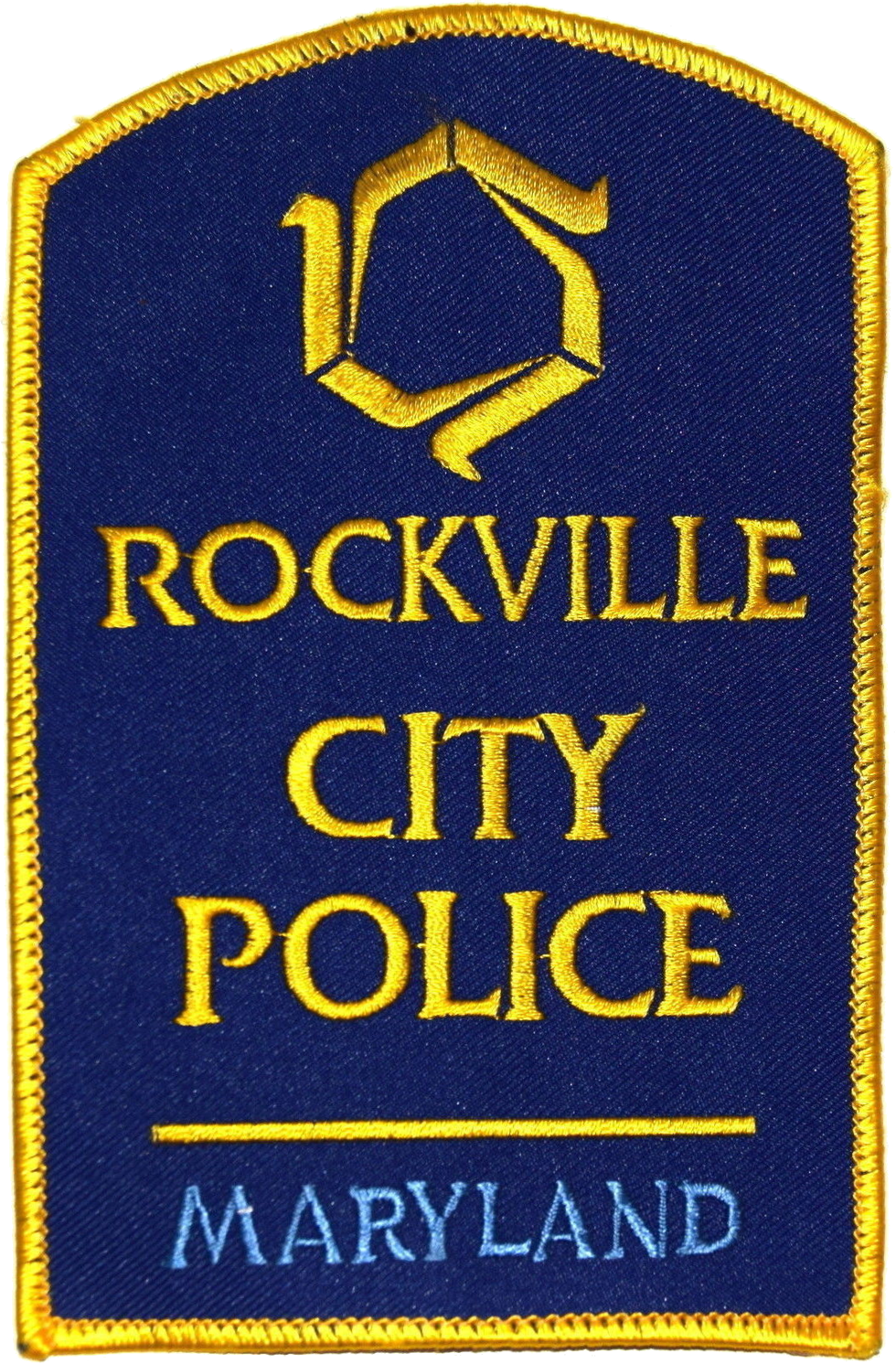
Former RCPD patch; no longer in use.

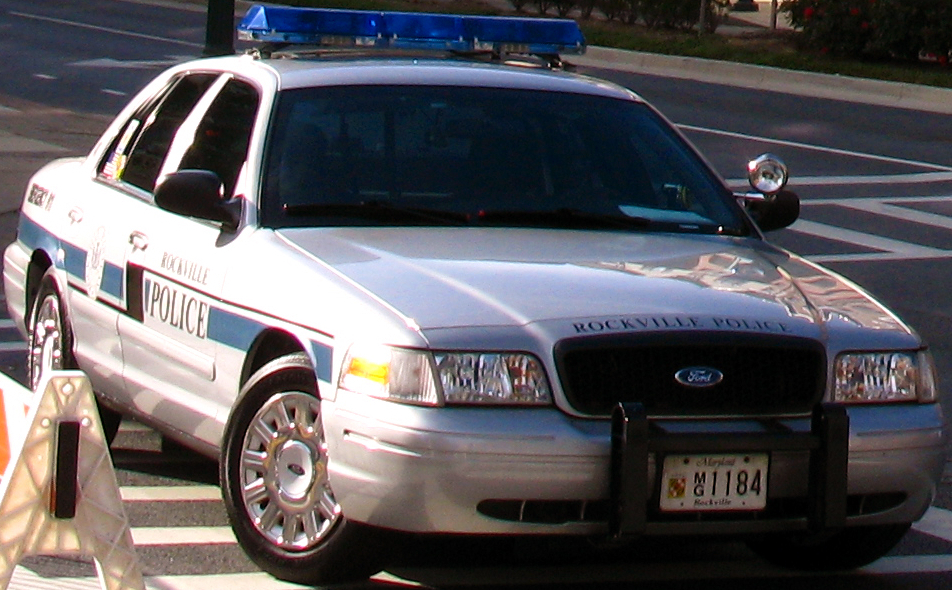
An RCPD Ford Crown Victoria Police Interceptor in October 2009

=== 1960s ===
In 1963, the RCPD began the use of radar to enforce speed limit compliance.

In 1968, the RCPD hired its first black policeman, Richard "Gene" Eugene Dyson. By 1972, the RCPD only had 9 policemen.

=== 1970s and 1980s ===
In 1976, the RCPD and the Montgomery County P.D. formed a burglary prevention unit to help deter and investigate burglaries in the city.

In June 1976, Dennis Dempsey became the RCPD's first captain. Under Chief Charles Wall, a former New Jersey police chief, a Burglary Prevention Unit composed of RCPD patrol officers and Montgomery County Police detectives was created. Jared Stout, a former Fairfax County Police media director, was chief from 1979 through 1989. Under Chief Stout, relations were formalized to allow Rockville City officers to respond to 911 calls.

=== 1990s ===
On March 26, 1994, the RPCD was accredited by the Commission on Accreditation for Law Enforcement Agencies (CALEA).

In 1996, the RCPD was awarded the Excellence in Community Policing Award by the National League of Cities.

In 1998, the City of Rockville annexed 900 acres of land, increasing the RCPD's jurisdiction by the same.

In 1999, the RCPD had 45 sworn policemen and 18 unsworn civilian employees. In 2000, the RCPD had 45 sworn policemen and 18 unsworn civilian employees.

=== 2000s ===
In 2001, the RCPD had 50 sworn policemen and 20 unsworn civilian employees.

=== 2010s ===
In 2011, the RCPD began the use of license plate-reading cameras on their cars. In 2012, the RCPD transitioned to an electronic, computerized method of issuing traffic citations.

In 2012, the RCPD moved to a new headquarters building.

In June 2013, the RCPD had 57 sworn policemen on duty and 36 unsworn civilian employees for a total of 93 members.

In 2016, the RCPD made 678 arrests, gave 95 drunk driving citations, issued 13,603 parking tickets, and gave 8,996 traffic warnings.

For 2016, the RCPD's budget was 12,181,400$. In 2017, the RCPD's policemen began wearing body cameras.

=== 2020s ===
In May 2025, the RCPD adopted a new badge and livery design for their fleet's patrol vehicles.

== Organization ==
The current chief of police is Jason L. West, since late-2024. The RCPD is divided into three bureaus:

- Field Services Bureau
- Special Operations Bureau
- Administrative Services Bureau

Falling under the Office of the Chief, the RCPD also has the following sections:

- Public relations
- Professional standards (equivalent to an internal affairs in other agencies)
- Inspection services
- Police chaplain

The RCPD's headquarters building is located at 2 West Montgomery Avenue in Rockville, Maryland.

=== List of Chiefs ===
No.	Chief		Rank	Tenure	Notes
		Walter Kent Atwell	Chief	Retired in 1986	
		Terrance N. "Terry" Treschuk	Chief	March 20, 1989 – June 1, 2016	Former Granby Police Department officer in Connecticut before joining the RCPD.
		Robert J. "Bob" Rappoport	Chief (acting)	June 1, 2016 – June 18, 2018	Acting chief after the retirement of Chief T.N. Treschuk. Became a policeman on March 1, 1988.
	Headshot of Victor Brito, Ex-Chief of Police of Rockville, Maryland	Victor Brito	Chief	June 18, 2018 – November 22, 2024	Was the chief of the Hagerstown Police Department.
	Headshot of Jason West, Chief of Police of Rockville, Maryland	Jason L. West	Chief (acting)	November 22, 2024 – June 4, 2025	Was named acting Chief when Brito quietly resigned.
	Headshot of Jason West, Chief of Police of Rockville, Maryland	Jason L. West	Chief	June 4, 2025 – Present	Was named acting Chief when Brito quietly resigned.

== Uniforms ==
RCPD uniforms are dark blue with a light blue stripe running down the side of each pant leg. RCPD officers who act as K-9 handlers wear dark blue BDUs. The Maryland state coat of arms is worn on the collars, except for high ranking officers like the chief, who wear rank insignia there instead.

== Ranks ==
Rank	Insignia	Notes
Chief		The RCPD is headed by a single chief; the chief's rank insignia is a golden eagle like the silver ones worn by colonels in the U.S. military. The chief wears a golden badge as opposed to the silver badges of ordinary RCPD policemen.
Major		The RCPD has three majors and they are responsible for each of the department's three bureaus. An RCPD major has duties similar to that RCPD captains had back in the 1970s. RCPD majors wear a golden badge as opposed to the silver badges worn by ordinary RCPD policemen.
Lieutenant		
Sergeant		
Corporal		
Officer		

=== Historical ranks ===
In the 1970s, the RCPD had a captain rank. However, it no longer does, having replaced the rank with major.

== Awards and decorations ==
Award	Ribbon	Criterion
Distinguished Service Citation		Presented to an RCPD officer who has rendered a service wherein the officer's diligence, perseverance, or timely judgment in the performance of their duties resulted in the accomplishment of a difficult task, the protection of life or property, the prevention of a major crime, or the apprehension of an armed and dangerous criminal.

== Fleet ==
The RCPD uses the sixth-generation Ford Taurus Police Interceptor Sedan and second-generation Dodge Charger as its primary patrol cars; the RCPD also uses the second-generation Ford Explorer Police Interceptor Utility. The RCPD also uses motorcycles.

=== Liveries ===
The RCPD's patrol cars are painted grey with their liveries consisting of black and blue stripes on the sides with the words "ROCKVILLE POLICE" inscribed near the hood and on the front doors, with the Rockville city seal emblazoned on the rear doors. Inscribed on both front fenders are the words "If You SEE Something, SAY Something", with the words "EMERGENCY 911" emblazoned on the rear quarter panels.

==== Past liveries ====
In the 1990s, the RCPD's patrol cars were for the most part white Chevrolet Luminas and first-generation Ford Crown Victorias with a single blue stripe on the side running the entire length of the car from front to back. The Rockville city seal was emblazoned on both of the front doors, with the department's 10-digit phone number, "301-340-7300", inscribed on the front fenders, with the words "ROCKVILLE CITY POLICE" pasted on the rear quarter panels.

In the early mid-2000s the RCPD used Chevrolet Blazers and eighth-generation Chevrolet Impala 9C1s with a very similar livery design as the current one used presently in the 2010s, however the cars were painted white instead of grey and the motto on the front fenders were omitted. In the mid-2000s, the RCPD used Chevrolet Tahoes and Ford Crown Victoria Police Interceptors with the cars' paint schemes were changed from white to grey.

== See also ==
- Gaithersburg Police Department
- List of law enforcement agencies in Maryland
- Montgomery County Police Department
