= Gaithersburg Police Department =

Municipal police force

- Patch of the Gaithersburg Police Department

- Seal of the Gaithersburg Police Department

- Badge of a Gaithersburg Police Department officer
- Common name: Gaithersburg P.D.
- Abbreviation: GPD
- Motto: Ministerium, integritas, observantia (In Latin: "Service, integrity, respect.")

Agency overview
- Formed: April 1, 1963; 63 years ago
- Annual budget: US$9,200,000 (equivalent to $12,511,948 in 2025) in 2014

Jurisdictional structure
- Legal jurisdiction: Gaithersburg, Maryland, U.S.
- General nature: Local civilian police

Operational structure
- Headquarters: 16 S Summit Ave, Gaithersburg, Maryland, U.S.
- Sworn officers: 57 (as of December 2016)
- Unsworn civilian employees: 9 (as of December 2016)
- Agency executive: Shawn Eastman, Chief of Police

Facilities
- Cars: Ford Police Interceptor Sedan, Ford Police Interceptor Utility, Dodge Charger

Website
- https://www.gaithersburgmd.gov/government/departments/gaithersburg-police-department

The Gaithersburg Police Department (GPD) is the municipal police force of Gaithersburg, Maryland.

== History ==
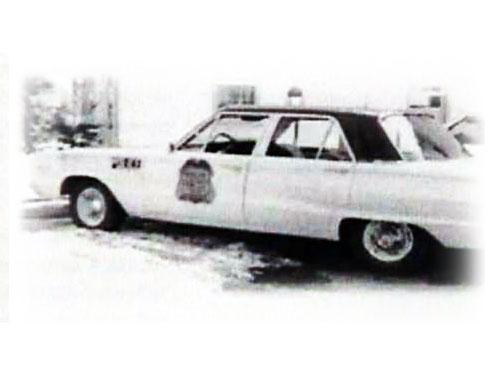
A Gaithersburg police car in the 1960s

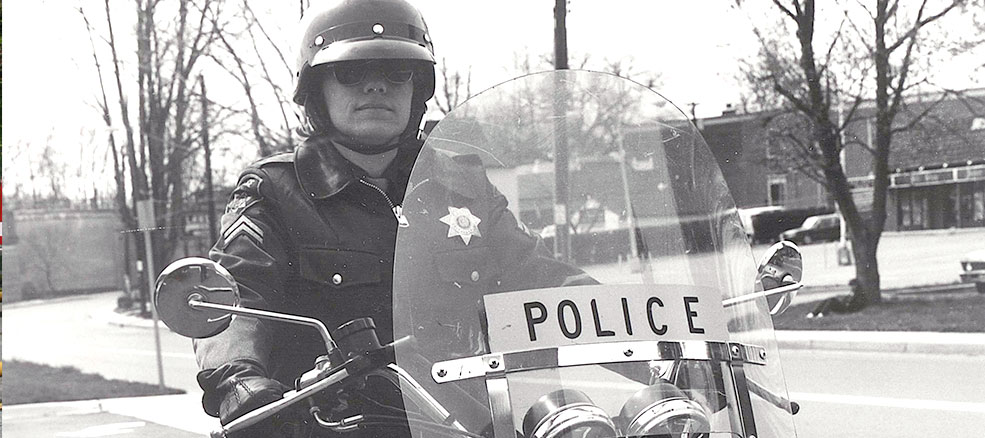
Gaithersburg P.D. motorcycle officer, c. 1980s

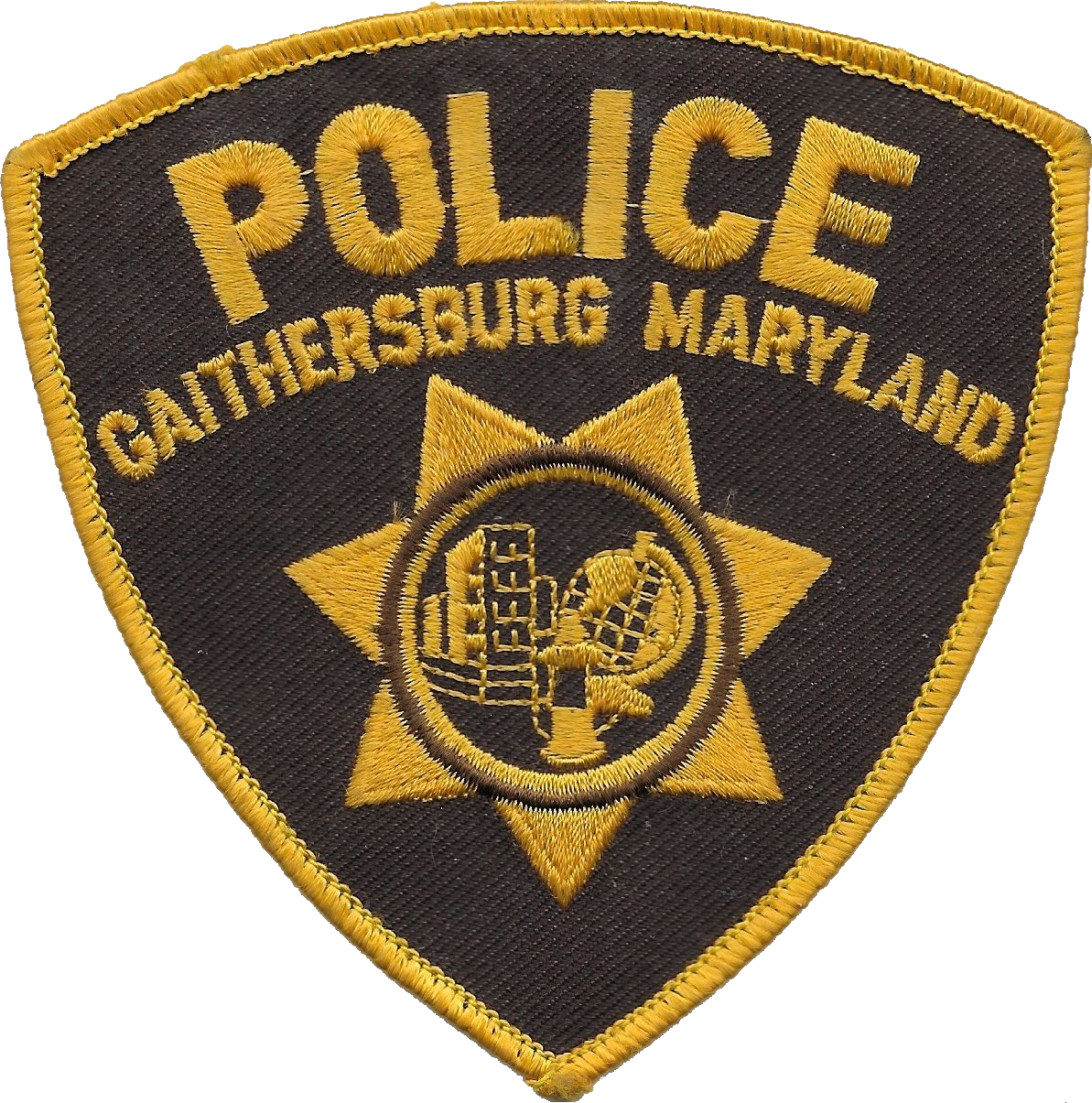
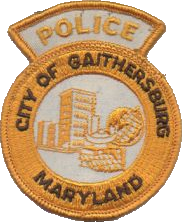
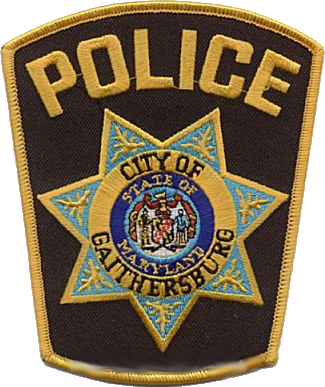
Former GPD patches from the 20th century. During the 20th century, the GPD used a star-shaped badge.

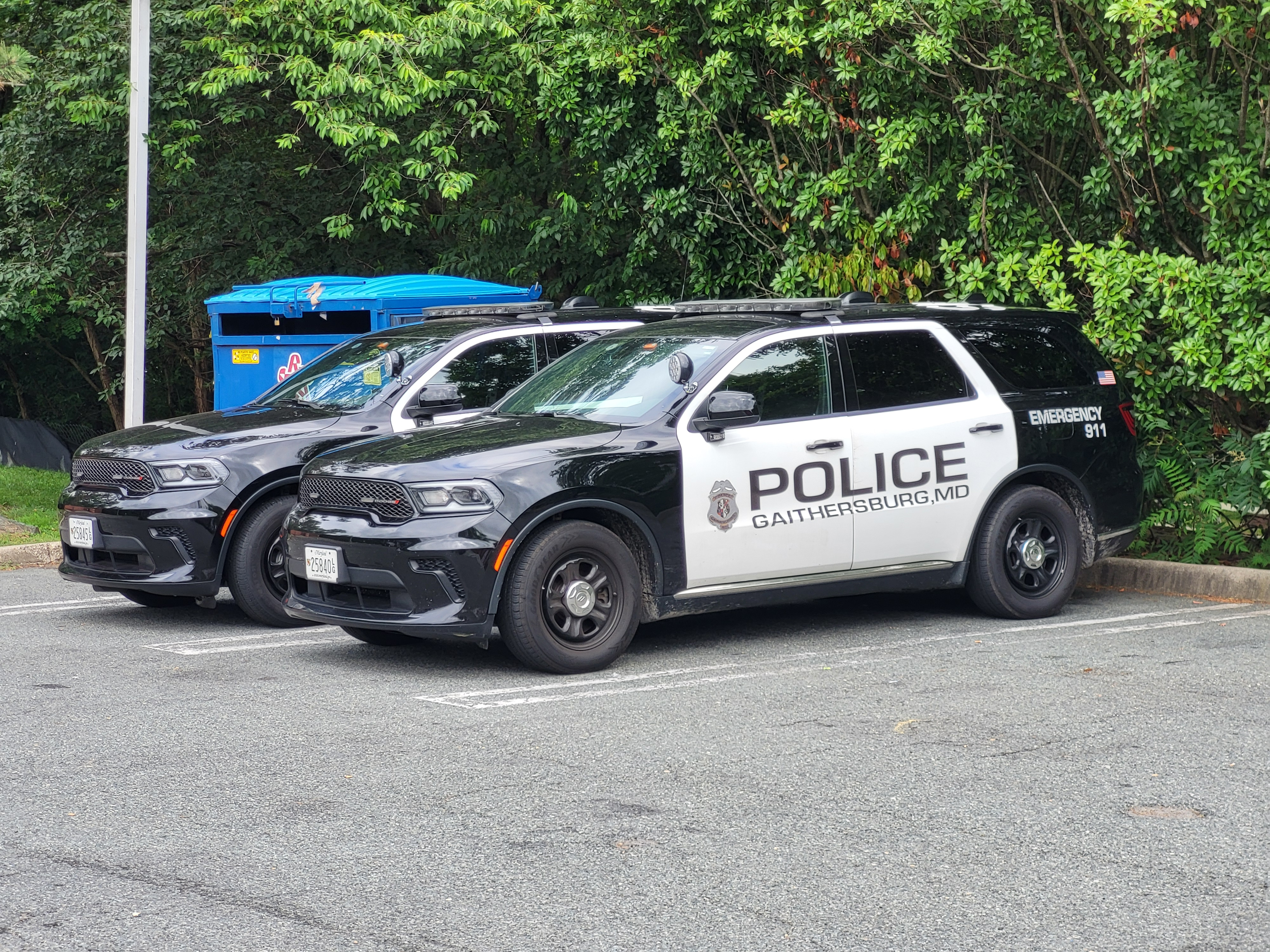
GPD SUVs in June 2026

=== 1963–1986: Founding ===
The Gaithersburg Police Department was founded on April 1, 1963, when a resolution creating it was signed into law by the mayor of the city at the time, Merton F. Duvall.

The town budget for fiscal year 1964 included "police protection" salaries for the solitary officer amounting to $4,000 (equivalent to $41524 today), and equipment purchases of $500 (equivalent to $5190 today).

It was under the administration of Chief DeVries that the Gaithersburg city police began to operate under its current system of dispatch through the Montgomery County Police Department. As a former Montgomery County Police lieutenant, DeVries was in a position to work with the County Police in a way that had previously not been possible.

=== 1986–1998: Expansion and modernization ===
The Gaithersburg Police Department grew from an authorized strength of three sworn officers and one civilian clerk in the early 1970s, when the city's population was 7,000, to its current complement of 57 sworn officers and nine civilians. The majority of that growth occurred from 1986 to 1998 under the direction of then-chief Mary Ann Viverette.

In 1983, the GPD formed a traffic unit.

Viverette was the GPD's chief from 1986 until her retirement in May 2007. John King succeeded Viverette and served until 2010. The GPD currently falls under the leadership of Shawn Eastman, who became the chief after the retirement of Mark P. Sroka in March 2026.

== Organization ==
=== Personnel ===
From 1971 to 1990, the Gaithersburg Police Department only hired officers who had former experience as police officers.

The majority of the Gaithersburg's police officers have come from other agencies. The experience of these officers comes from agencies such as Montgomery County, Washington, D.C., United States Secret Service, Montgomery County Sheriff's Office, Maryland National Capital Police, and Baltimore City, to name a few.

=== Chiefs ===
David Marstiller was the first Chief of Police, although there are references to a "Town Marshall" in the minutes of Town Council Meetings prior to 1963.

Over the years, there would be several chiefs of police; James Tassie, formerly of the Rockville City Police Department; Marson Johnson, who had been an officer in Michigan; John F. DeVries and George Fusco, both of whom had retired from the Montgomery County Police Department as lieutenants.

=== List of chiefs ===
No.	Chief	Rank	Life	Tenure	Notes
1	David Marstiller	Chief			
2	James Tassie	Chief			Former Rockville City Police Department officer.
3	Marson Harry Johnson, Sr.	Director of Police Services	February 20, 1941 – June 11, 2004 (aged 63)	1974–1977	Former Michigan policeman.
4	John F. DeVries, Sr.	Chief	Died in 1981 at age 52.	1977–1980	Former MCPD lieutenant
5	George Fusco	Chief		1981–1986	Former MCPD lieutenant.
6	Mary Ann Viverette	Chief		1986–2007	Retired in May 2007
7	John King	Chief		2007–2010	
8	Mark P. Sroka	Chief		2010–2026	
9	Shawn Eastman	Chief		2026–present	

== See also ==
- Rockville City Police Department
